= La Muette station =

Metro station in Paris, France

La Muette
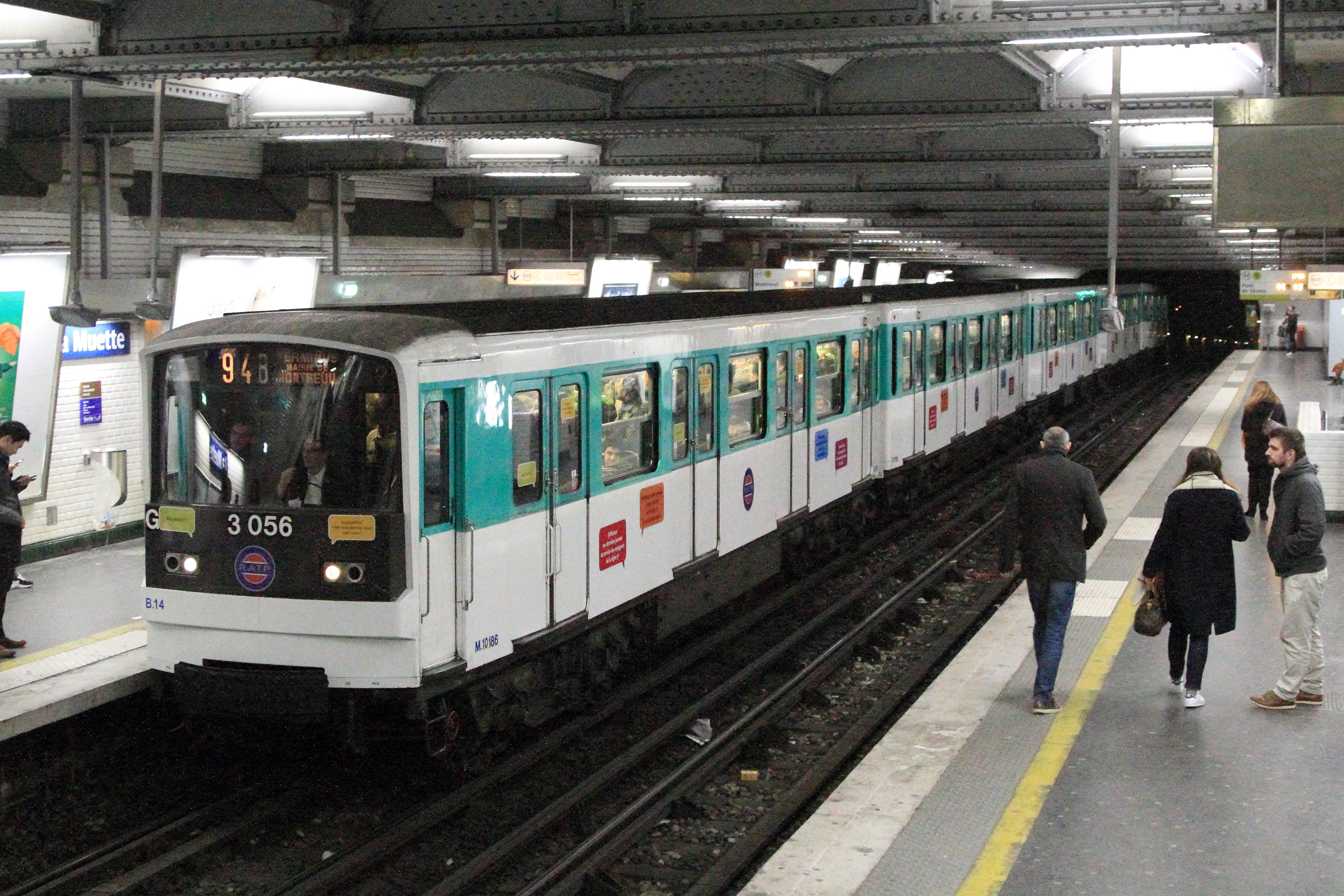
- Last MF 67 prior his retirement on 14 December 2016

General information
- Location: 16th arrondissement of Paris; Île-de-France; France
- Coordinates: 48°51′28″N 2°16′25″E
- System: Paris Métro station
- Owner: RATP
- Operator: RATP

Other information
- Fare zone: 1

History
- Opened: 8 November 1922

Services
Preceding station	Paris Metro	Following station
Ranelagh towards Pont de Sèvres	Line 9	Rue de la Pompe towards Mairie de Montreuil
Connections to other stations
Preceding station	RER	Following station
Avenue Henri Martin towards Pontoise	RER C transfer at Boulainvilliers	Avenue du Président Kennedy towards Massy-Palaiseau or Dourdan-la-Forêt
Location
- Location within Paris

La Muette (French pronunciation: [la mɥɛt]) is a station on line 9 of the Paris Métro, in France, named after the Chaussée de la Muette, a nearby street. The station opened on 8 November 1922 with the opening of the first section of the line from Trocadéro to Exelmans.

== History ==
The Chaussée de la Muette is named after the Château de la Muette, which was converted from a hunting lodge to a small castle for Margaret of Valois, the first wife of King Henry IV of France. The meaning of the name of the hunting lodge is not known. It may have derived from "muete", a spelling which appears frequently up to the end of the eighteenth century, and which signifies a pack of deer-hounds (meute); it may have come from the "mues" or horns which stags shed in the autumn; or again from the "mue" or moulting-period of hunting hawks. The old château was demolished in the 1920s to make room for a wealthy housing estate. A new château was built nearby for Baron Henri James de Rothschild (1872–1947) in 1922. This is now the headquarters for the Organisation for Economic Co-operation and Development.

== Passenger services ==
=== Access ===
The station has two entrances:

- access 1 - Chaussée de la Muette, consisting of a fixed staircase decorated with a Val d'Osne candelabra, leading to the corner formed by Avenue Mozart and Chaussée de la Muette;
- access 2 - Avenue Mozart, consisting of an escalator going up only allowing only an exit, located to the right of no. 5 of the avenue.

The ticket room in the station is in the form of a mezzanine overlooking the tracks, a rare situation that it shares with the two previous stations in the direction towards Mairie de Montreuil (Ranelagh and Jasmin). Thus, the platforms are visible from the room and the information desk.

=== Station layout ===
Street Level

B1	Mezzanine

Line 9 platforms	Side platform, doors will open on the right
Line 9 platforms	Westbound	← toward Pont de Sèvres (Ranelagh)
Line 9 platforms	Eastbound	toward Mairie de Montreuil (Rue de la Pompe) →
Line 9 platforms	Side platform, doors will open on the right

=== Platforms ===
La Muette is a standard station. It has two platforms separated by the metro tracks. Established at ground level, the ceiling is made up of a metal deck, whose silver-coloured beams are supported by vertical walls. White bevelled ceramic tiles cover the walls, the tunnel exits and the shaft staircase surrounds giving access to the RER. The metal advertising frames are inclined, and the name of the station is inscribed in Parisine font on enamelled plaques. The green seats are in the Akiko style. The lighting is partly indirect, projected on the walls, the advertising, and the vaults above the platforms.

The decoration is like that of the École Militaire station on line 8 and Charles Michels station on line 10, also built with a metal roof, bodied in the 1960s and completely renovated at the end of the 2000s.

=== Other connections ===
The station is connected to the Boulainvilliers station on the RER C line, accessible via an underground corridor.

In addition, it is served by lines 22, 32, 52 and 70 of the RATP Bus Network and, at night, by line N53 of the Noctilien bus network.

== Gallery ==
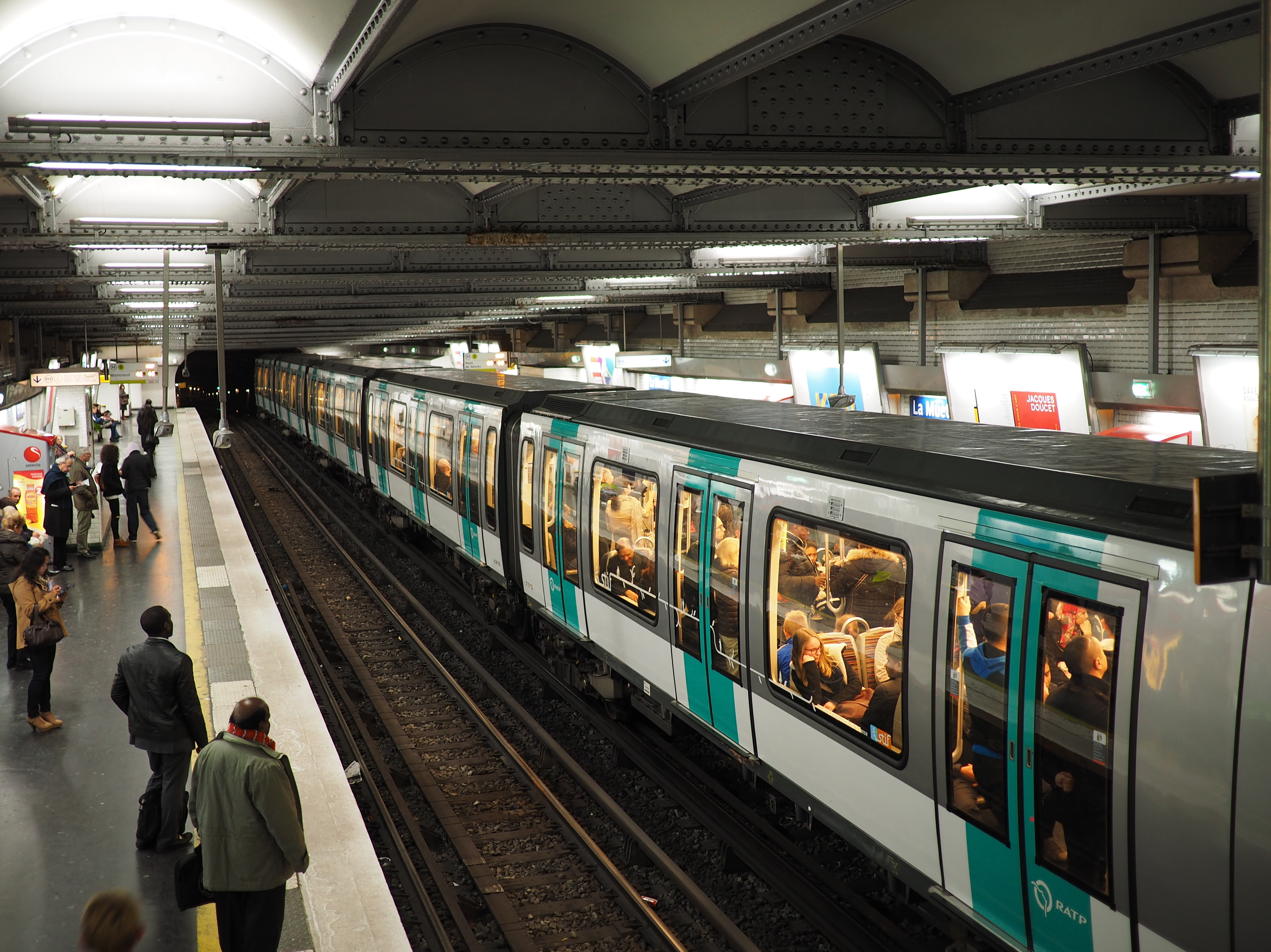
MF 01 rolling stock at La Muette in October 2015

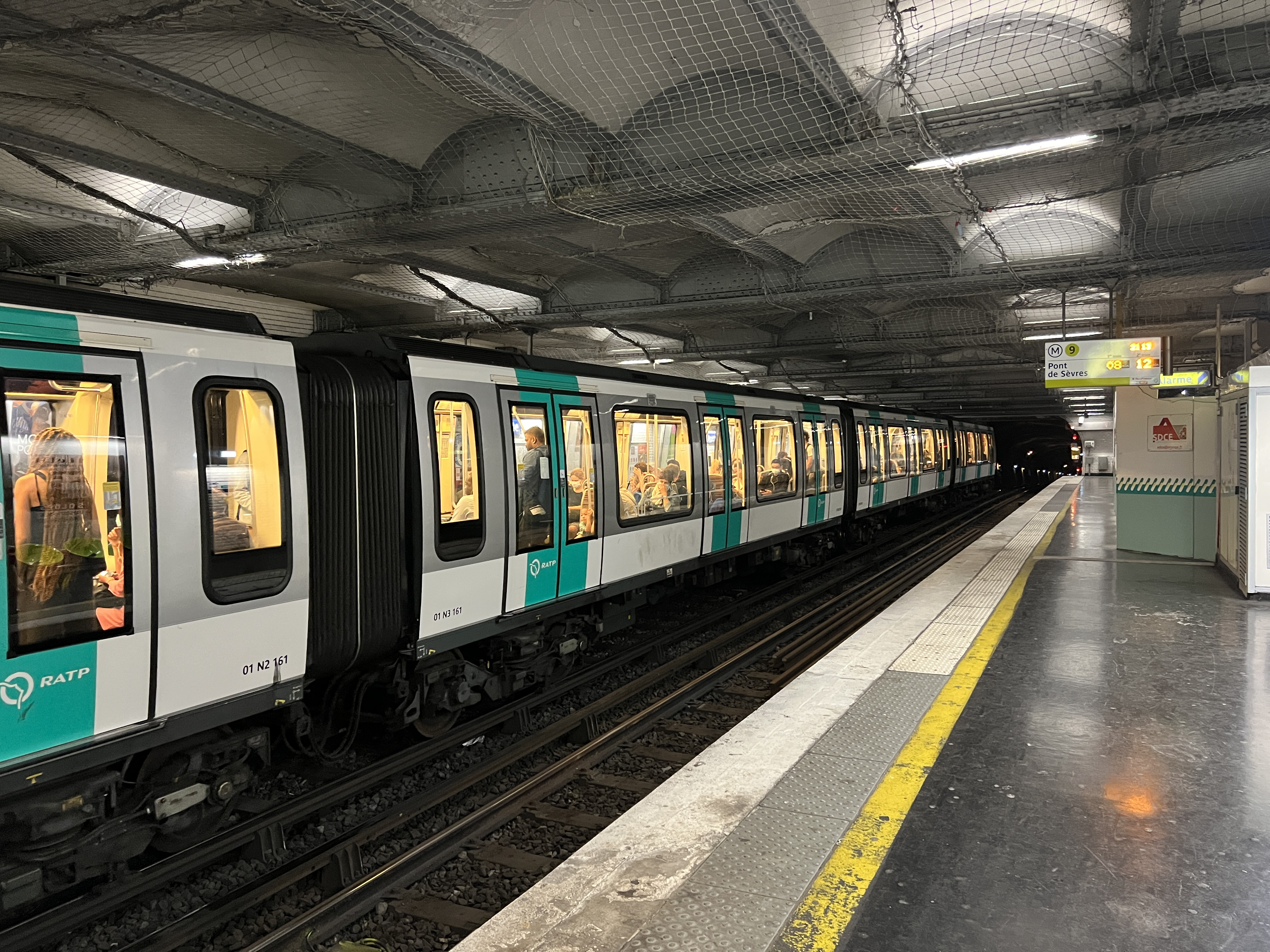
MF 01 rolling stock at La Muette in July 2022

== Places of interest ==
Nearby are (closest first):

- Jardin du Ranelagh
- Organisation for Economic Co-operation and Development
- Musée Marmottan Monet, a museum specialising in impressionist works, including a significant collection of paintings by Claude Monet and works by Berthe Morisot, Edgar Degas, Édouard Manet and Pierre-Auguste Renoir.
- Bois de Boulogne
