= List of Paris railway stations =

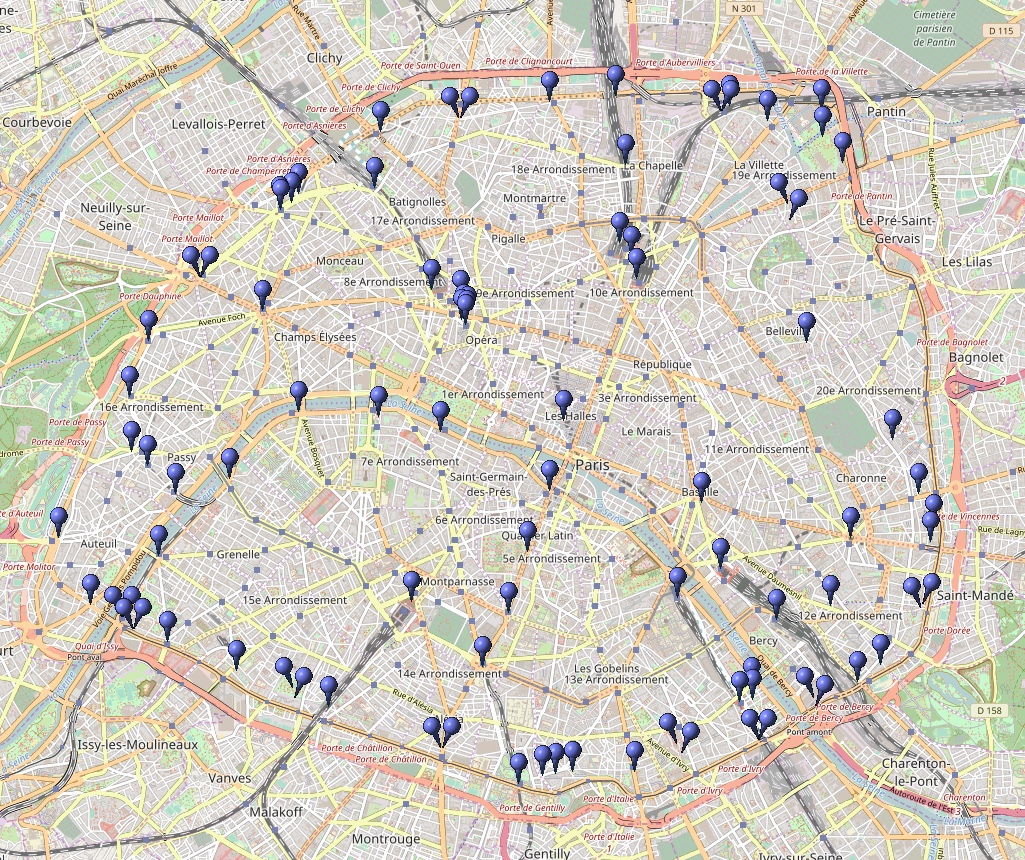
Former and current railway stations in Paris

Below is a list of railway stations in Paris, France, current and historical.

== Active stations ==
=== Major lines ===
Major line railway stations of Paris.

Railway stations and the respective areas they serve on departure from Paris.

These stations are the terminal stations of major lines (trains going beyond the Île-de-France region), and, except for Bercy, the suburban Transilien lines. Austerlitz, Saint-Lazare, Lyon and Nord are also stations on the RER network. All stations connect to stations of the Paris Métro.

- Gare d'Austerlitz:
  - trains to central France, Toulouse and the Pyrenees
  - Intercités de nuit night train
- Gare de Bercy:
  - trains to central France
- Gare de l'Est:
  - trains to eastern France, Germany, and Switzerland
  - TGV Est to eastern France, Germany (ICE), and Switzerland (TGV Lyria)
  - (via Magenta station)
- Gare de Lyon:
  - trains to southeastern France and Languedoc-Roussillon
  - TGV Sud-Est, Rhône-Alpes and Méditerranée, to Spain, Switzerland (TGV Lyria) and Italy
  - Frecciarossa to Italy
- Gare Montparnasse:
  - trains to western and southwestern France
  - TGV Ouest and LGV Atlantique
- Gare du Nord:
  - trains to northern France
  - LGV Nord to Lille-Europe
  - Eurostar to London, Belgium, the Netherlands, and Germany.
  - (via Magenta)
- Gare Saint-Lazare:
  - trains to Normandy
  - (via Haussmann–Saint-Lazare)

=== Suburban lines ===
==== RER stations ====
The stations of major lines (the preceding section) which are also stations of the RER are not included. These stations are used only by the RER lines designated.

- Auber
- Avenue Foch
- Avenue Henri Martin
- Avenue du Président Kennedy
- Bibliothèque François Mitterrand
- Boulainvilliers
- Champ de Mars–Tour Eiffel
- Charles de Gaulle–Étoile
- Châtelet–Les Halles
- Cité Universitaire
- Denfert-Rochereau
- Haussmann–Saint-Lazare
- Invalides
- Javel
- Luxembourg
- Magenta
- Musée d'Orsay
- Nation
- Neuilly–Porte Maillot
- Pereire-Levallois
- Pont de l'Alma
- Pont du Garigliano
- Port-Royal
- Porte de Clichy
- Rosa Parks
- Saint-Michel–Notre-Dame

==== Transilien stations ====
- Pont Cardinet

== Stations no longer used ==
=== Chemin de fer de Petite Ceinture ===
The Chemin de fer de Petite Ceinture is a line which circled Paris which is no longer in use. The majority of the stations on this line have been abandoned, though some have been reused.

From the west clockwise, the stations are:

==== Former Ouest company "Paris à Auteuil" line ====
- Auteuil-Boulogne
- Passy-la-Muette
- Avenue Henri Martin (now used by RER C)
- Avenue du Bois-de-Boulogne (now used by RER C)
- Neuilly-Maillot (now used by RER C)
- Courcelles-Levallois (now used by RER C)

==== Former rail-company syndicate "Chemin de fer de Ceinture (Rive Droite)" ====
- Avenue de Clichy (now used by RER C)
- Avenue de Saint-Ouen
- Boulevard Ornano
- La Chapelle-Saint-Denis
- L’Évangile (formerly Gare de la Chapelle), disused classification yard
- Ménilmontant
- Pont de Flandres
- Belleville-Villette, also freight station
- Charonne, also freight station
- Rue d'Avron
- Avenue de Vincennes
- Bel-Air Ceinture
- Rue Claude Decaen
- Bercy-Ceinture
- La Rapée-Bercy, disused classification yard
- Orléans-Ceinture

==== Former Ouest company "Chemin de fer de Ceinture (Rive Gauche)" ====
- Maison Blanche
- Parc de Montsouris
- Montrouge
- Ouest ceinture
- Abattoirs de Vaugirard, specially for livestock
- Vaugirard Ceinture
- Point-du-Jour

=== Other stations ===
- Gare du boulevard Masséna, on RER C, closed December 3, 2000 because it was replaced by Bibliothèque François Mitterrand.

== Abandoned or destroyed stations ==
- Gare de la Bastille on the former line Paris-Vincennes, demolished to construct the Opéra Bastille
- Gare de Reuilly on the former line Paris-Vincennes
- Gare d'Orsay, converted into the Musée d’Orsay
- Gare de Paris-Bestiaux, abandoned
- Gare de Paris-Gobelins, former freight station, under pavement, visible from the south of Rue Nationale
- Gare de la Glacière-Gentilly
- Gare de Grenelle-marchandises
- Gare du Champ de Mars from the Exposition Universelle of 1878, moved in 1897 to Asnières-sur-Seine (Gare des Carbonnets), threatened by ruin despite being listed as a historic monument since 1985.

== See also ==
- List of Paris Métro stations
- List of RER stations
- List of Transilien stations
- SNCF
