= Ranelagh station (Paris Metro) =

Metro station in Paris, France

Ranelagh
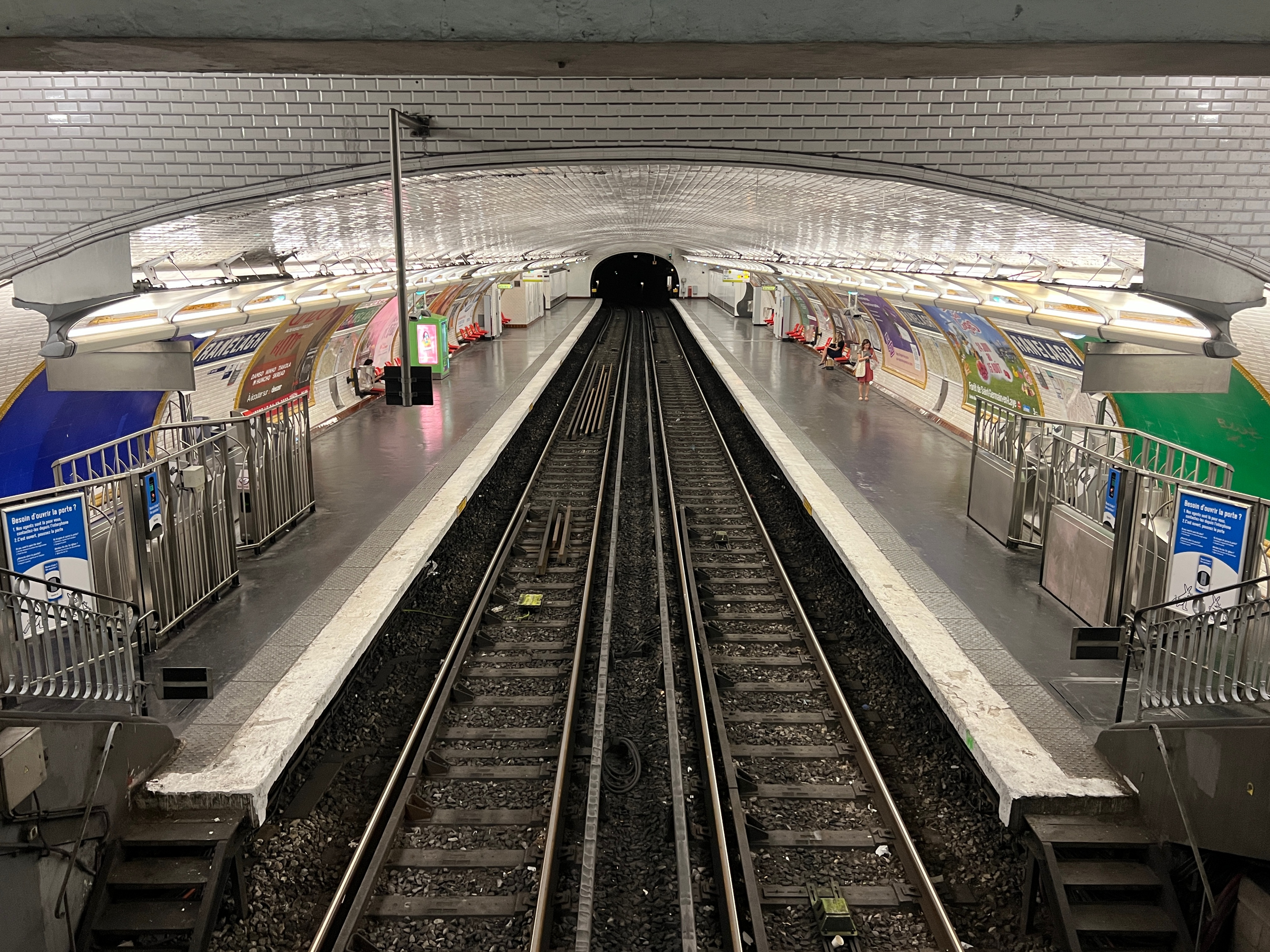
- Platforms

General information
- Location: 16th arrondissement of Paris; Île-de-France; France
- Coordinates: 48°51′18″N 2°16′11″E
- System: Paris Métro station
- Owner: RATP
- Operator: RATP
- Line: Paris Metro Paris Metro Line 9
- Platforms: 2 (2 side platforms)
- Tracks: 2

Construction
- Accessible: no

Other information
- Station code: 17-09
- Fare zone: 1

History
- Opened: 8 November 1922

Passengers
- 1,779,206 (2021)

Services
Preceding station	Paris Metro	Following station
Jasmin towards Pont de Sèvres	Line 9	La Muette towards Mairie de Montreuil
Location
- Location within Paris

Ranelagh (French pronunciation: [ʁanlaɡ]) is a station on line 9 of the Paris Métro located in the 16th arrondissement.

It is named after the nearby rue de Ranelagh, which in turn was named after Lord Ranelagh, an Irish peer and amateur musician, who built a rotunda for concerts in his park, Ranelagh Gardens, in Chelsea in 1750 and after whom the affluent Dublin suburb of Ranelagh is named.

A similar establishment, the Jardin du Ranelagh was established on the grounds of the Château de la Muette in 1774. The place was fashionable under Marie Antoinette, under the Directory and then again under the Restoration. It disappeared in 1858 with the creation of the Bois de Boulogne.

== History ==
The station opened on 8 November 1922 as part of the initial section of the line from Trocadéro to Exelmans.

As part of the "Un métro + beau" programme by the RATP, the station's corridors and platform lighting were renovated and modernised on 28 April 2004.

In 2019, the station was used by 2,314,539 passengers, making it the 222nd busiest of the Métro network out of 302 stations.

In 2020, the station was used by 1,234,203 passengers amidst the COVID-19 pandemic, making it the 206th busiest of the Métro network out of 304 stations.

In 2021, the station was used by 1,779,206 passengers, making it the 199th busiest of the Métro network out of 304 stations.

== Passenger services ==
=== Access ===
The station has two accesses:

- Access 1: avenue Mozart
- Access 2: rue du Ranelagh

=== Station layout ===
Street Level
B1	Mezzanine
Platform level	Side platform, doors will open on the right
Platform level	Westbound	← toward Pont de Sèvres (Jasmin)
Platform level	Eastbound	toward Mairie de Montreuil (La Muette) →
Platform level	Side platform, doors will open on the right

=== Platforms ===
The station has a standard configuration with two tracks surrounded by two platforms separated by the subway tracks, and the vault is elliptical. The ticket barriers and passenger information counter located at the mezzanine overlooks the tracks, an uncommon situation it shares only with La Muette and Jasmin, which the station is located in between.

The decoration is in the style used for most metro stations. The lighting canopies are white and rounded in the Gaudin style of the metro revival of the 2000s, and the bevelled white ceramic tiles cover the walls, the vault, and the tunnel exits. The advertising frames are made of honey-coloured earthenware with vegetable motifs and the name of the station is also in earthenware in the interwar style of the original CMP. The seats are in the Motte style in red.

The decoration of the platforms is thus identical to that of the neighbouring station, Jasmin.

=== Other connections ===
The station is also served by lines 22, 52 (only in the direction of Opéra), and 70 of the RATP bus network.

== Nearby ==
- Jardin du Ranelagh
- Lycée Molière
- Maison de la Radio et de la Musique
- Petite Ceinture du 16^{e}
- Seychelles Embassy
- Théâtre Le Ranelagh

== Gallery ==
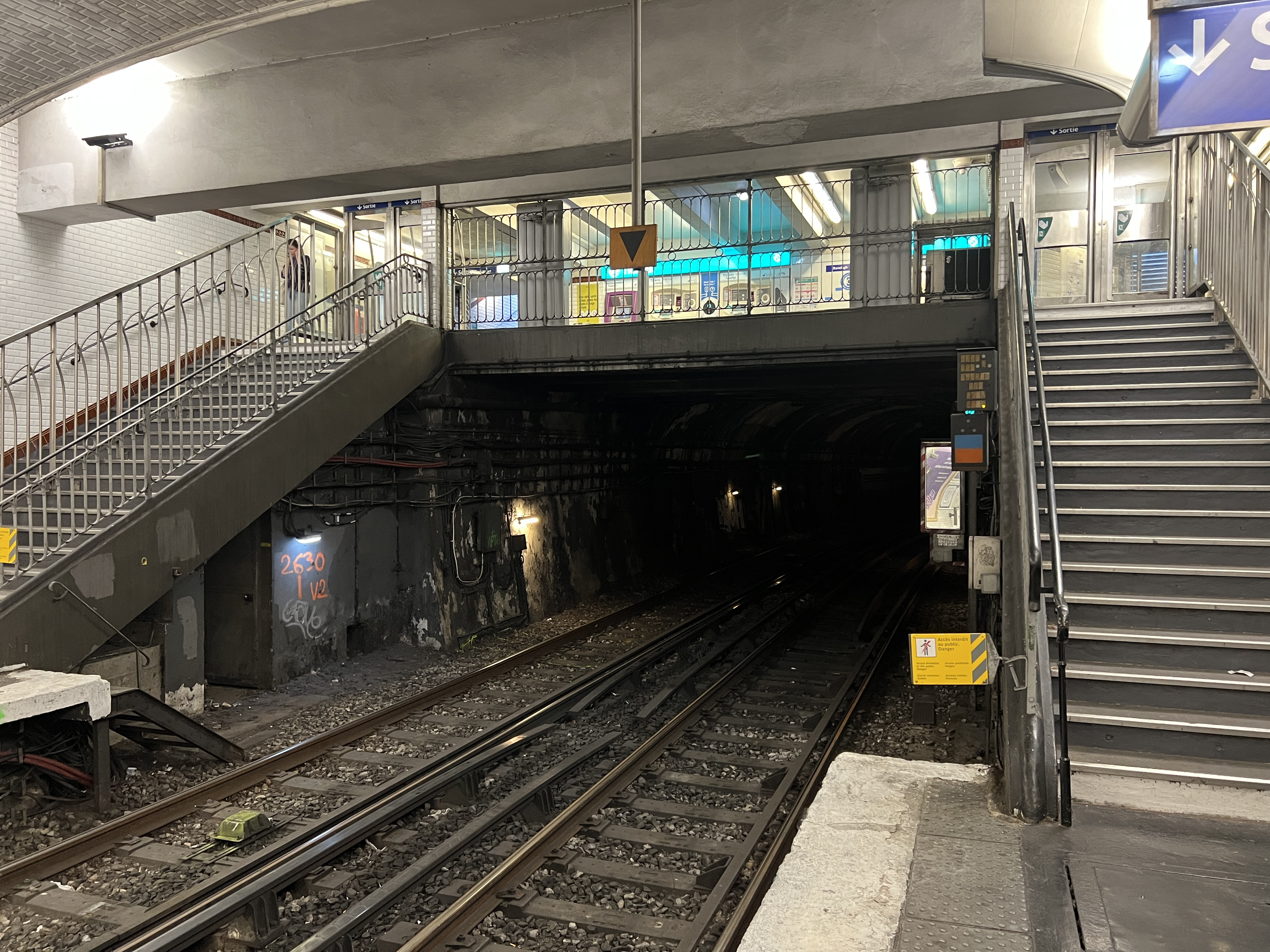
Mezzanine overlooking the platforms

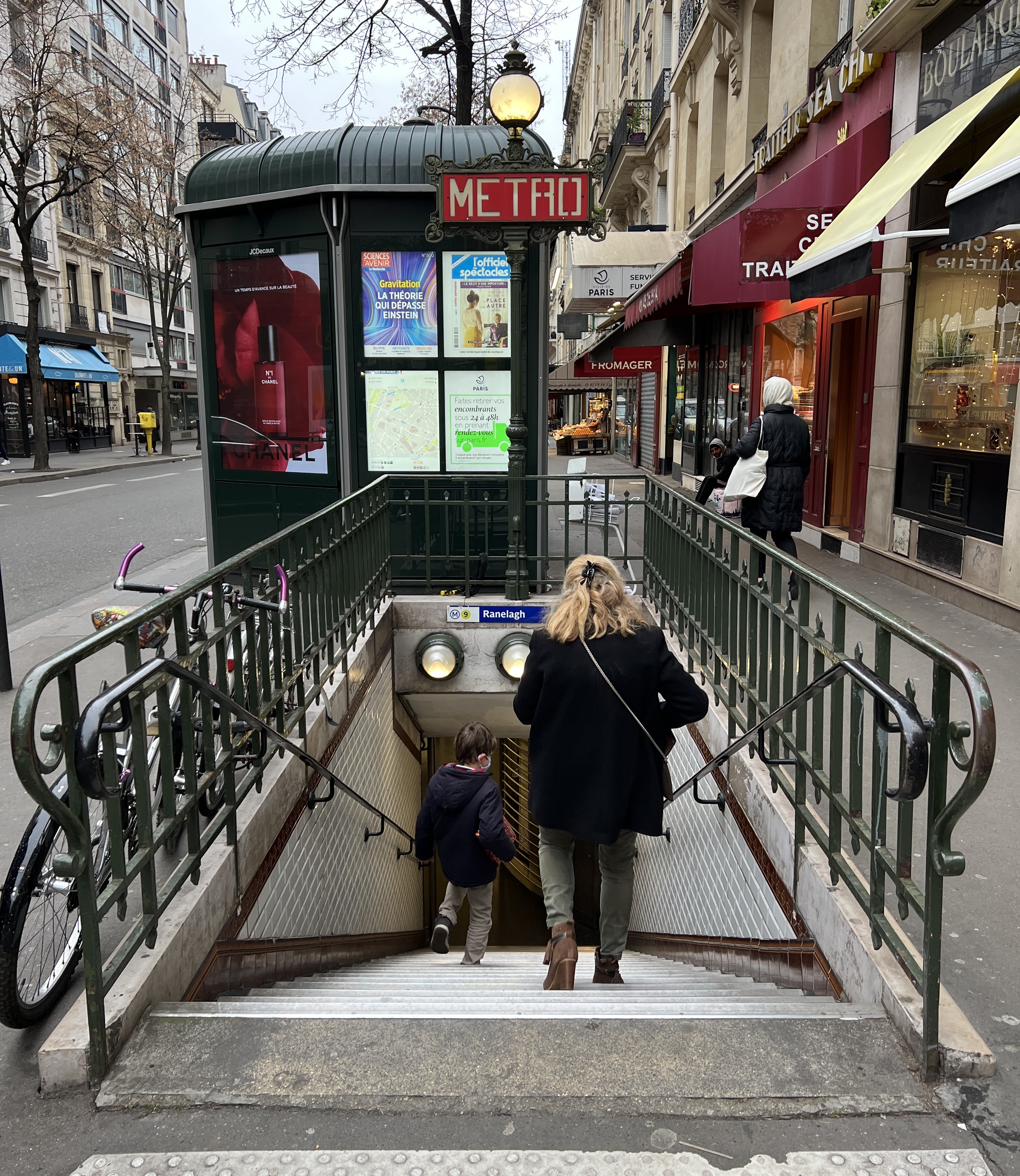
Access 1

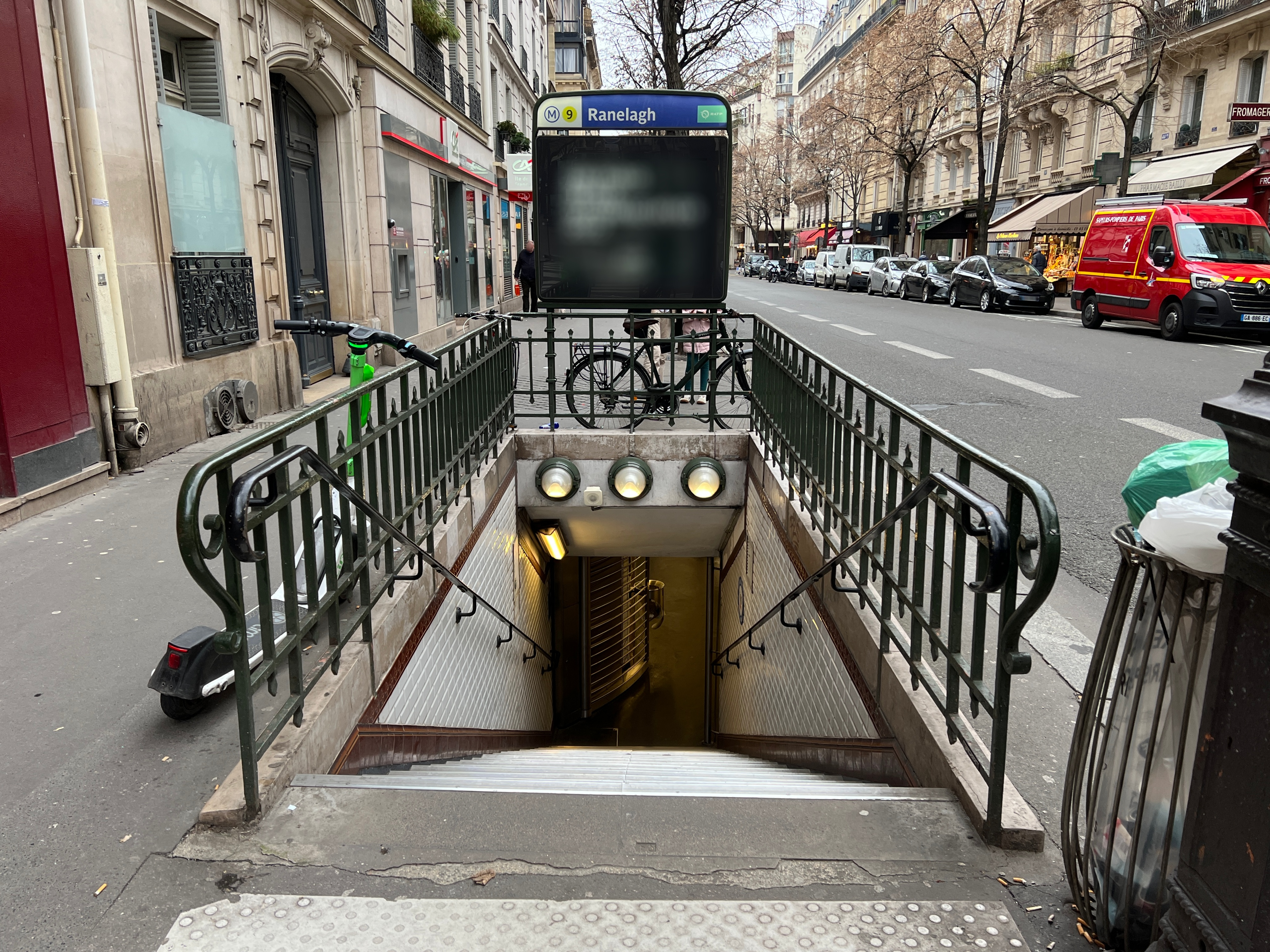
Access 2
