= Jasmin station =

Metro station in Paris, France

Jasmin
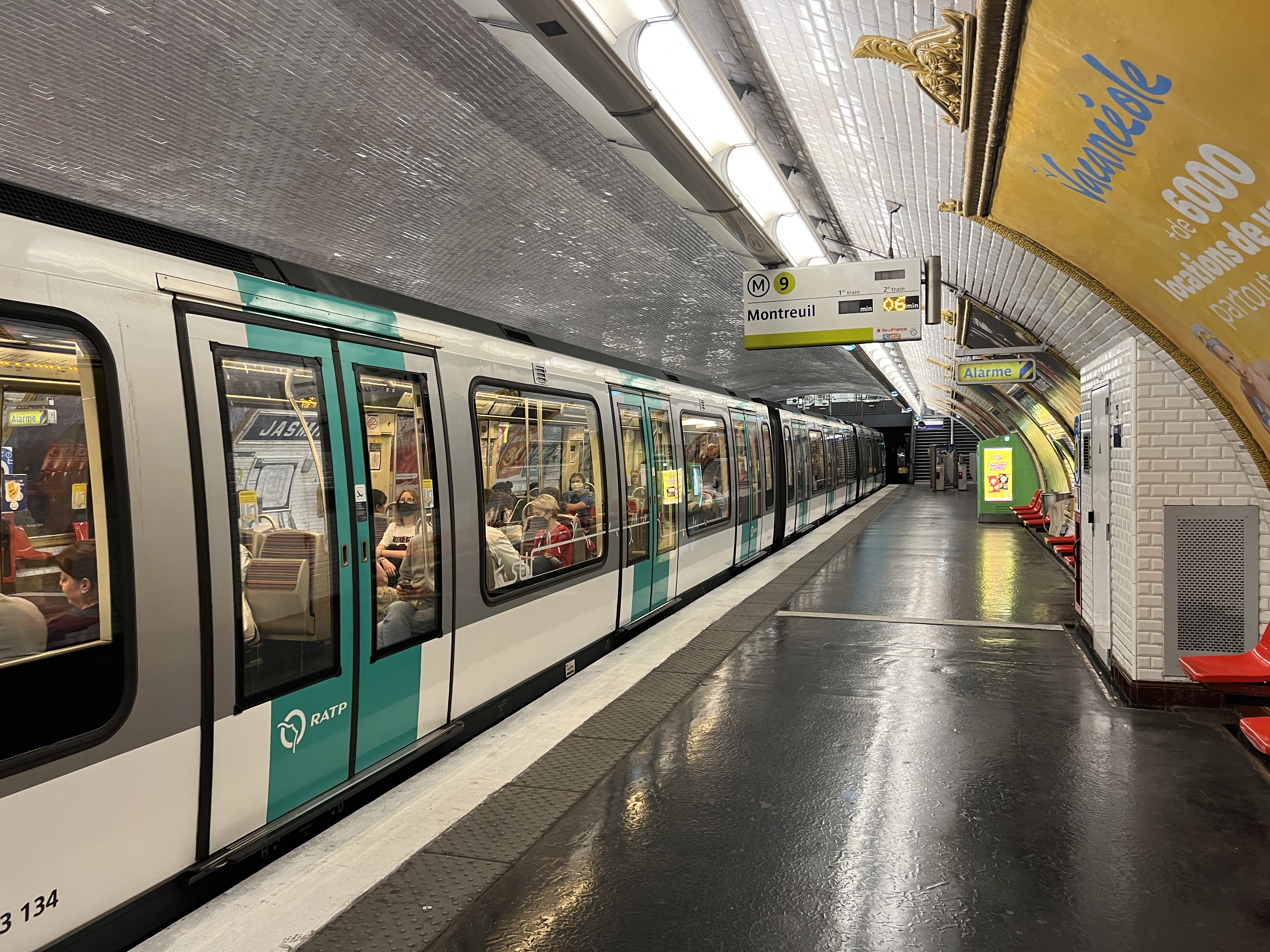
- MF 01 rolling stock at Jasmin

General information
- Location: 16th arrondissement of Paris; Île-de-France; France
- Coordinates: 48°51′07″N 2°16′04″E
- System: Paris Métro station
- Owner: RATP
- Operator: RATP
- Line: Paris Metro Paris Metro Line 9
- Platforms: 2
- Tracks: 2

Construction
- Accessible: no

Other information
- Fare zone: 1

History
- Opened: 8 November 1922

Services
Preceding station	Paris Metro	Following station
Michel-Ange–Auteuil towards Pont de Sèvres	Line 9	Ranelagh towards Mairie de Montreuil
Location
- Location within Paris

Jasmin (French pronunciation: [ʒasmɛ̃]; lit. 'Jasmine') is a station on Line 9 of the Paris Métro. It serves Rue Jasmin in the 16th arrondissement. The station was first used with the opening of the first section of the line from Trocadéro to Exelmans.

== History ==
The station was opened on 8 November 1922. It is named after the French poet Jacques Jasmin (born Jacques Boé; 1798–1864), called the wig-maker poet, whose works in Langue d’oc were the precursor of the Félibrige, the literary movement of Provençal.

Rue Jasmin is a section of the old Rue de la Cure. This was a reference to the medical cures claimed for the mineral springs of the former vineyards of the surrounding suburb of Auteuil.

As part of RATP's metro renewal programme, the station corridors and platform lighting were renovated by 28 June 2005.

On March 20, 2018, half of the name plates on the station's platforms were temporarily replaced by the RATP to celebrate the arrival of spring, as in five other stations. Taking up the surname of Jasmin in capital letters, the new plates are decorated with motifs representing white jasmine.

In 2019, 1,935,764 passengers entered this station, which placed it in the 249th place of metro stations for its attendance out of 302. In 2020, with the Covid-19 crisis, 1,017,366 passengers entered this station, which placed it in the 239th position of metro stations for its attendance. In 2021, attendance gradually increased, with 1,418,238 passengers entering this station which placed it in the 243rd position of metro stations for its attendance out of 304.

== Passenger services ==
=== Access ===
The station has two accesses, each consisting of a fixed staircase decorated with a Dervaux type balustrade:

- access 1 - Rue Jasmin, consisting of a fixed staircase decorated with a Val d'Osne style candelabra, leading to the right of No. 78 Avenue Mozart, at the corner with Rue de l'Yvette facing No. 2 of the latter;
- access 2 - Rue Ribera, consisting of an escalator allowing only an exit, located to the right of no. 85 avenue Mozart, at the corner of Rue Ribera facing no. 47 thereof.

The old switch-room in the station was established in the form of a mezzanine overlooking the tracks, a rare situation that it shares only with the following two metro stations in the direction of Mairie de Montreuil, Ranelagh and La Muette. Thus, the platforms are visible from the old-switch room and the information counters. The latter was one of the few style of the 1970s to survive until the 2010s.

=== Station layout ===
Street Level

B1	Mezzanine

Line 9 platforms	Side platform, doors will open on the right
Line 9 platforms	Westbound	← toward Pont de Sèvres (Michel-Ange – Auteuil)
Line 9 platforms	Eastbound	toward Mairie de Montreuil (Ranelagh) →
Line 9 platforms	Side platform, doors will open on the right

=== Platform ===
Jasmin is a standard configuration station. It has two platforms separated by the metro tracks and the vault is elliptical. The decoration is in the style used for the majority of metro stations. The lighting canopies are white and rounded in the Gaudin style of the 2000s metro revival, and the bevelled white ceramic tiles cover the straight walls, vault, tunnel exits and corridor outlets. The advertising frames are made of honey-coloured earthenware and the name of the station is also in earthenware in the style of the original CMP. The Motte style seats are red. The decoration of the platforms is completely identical to that of the nearby metro station, Ranelagh.

A cultural poster on the poet Jasmin is affixed on the platform in the direction of Mairie de Montreuil.

=== Bus connections ===
The station has only one connection with line 22 of the RATP Bus Network, in the direction of Opéra only.

== Gallery ==
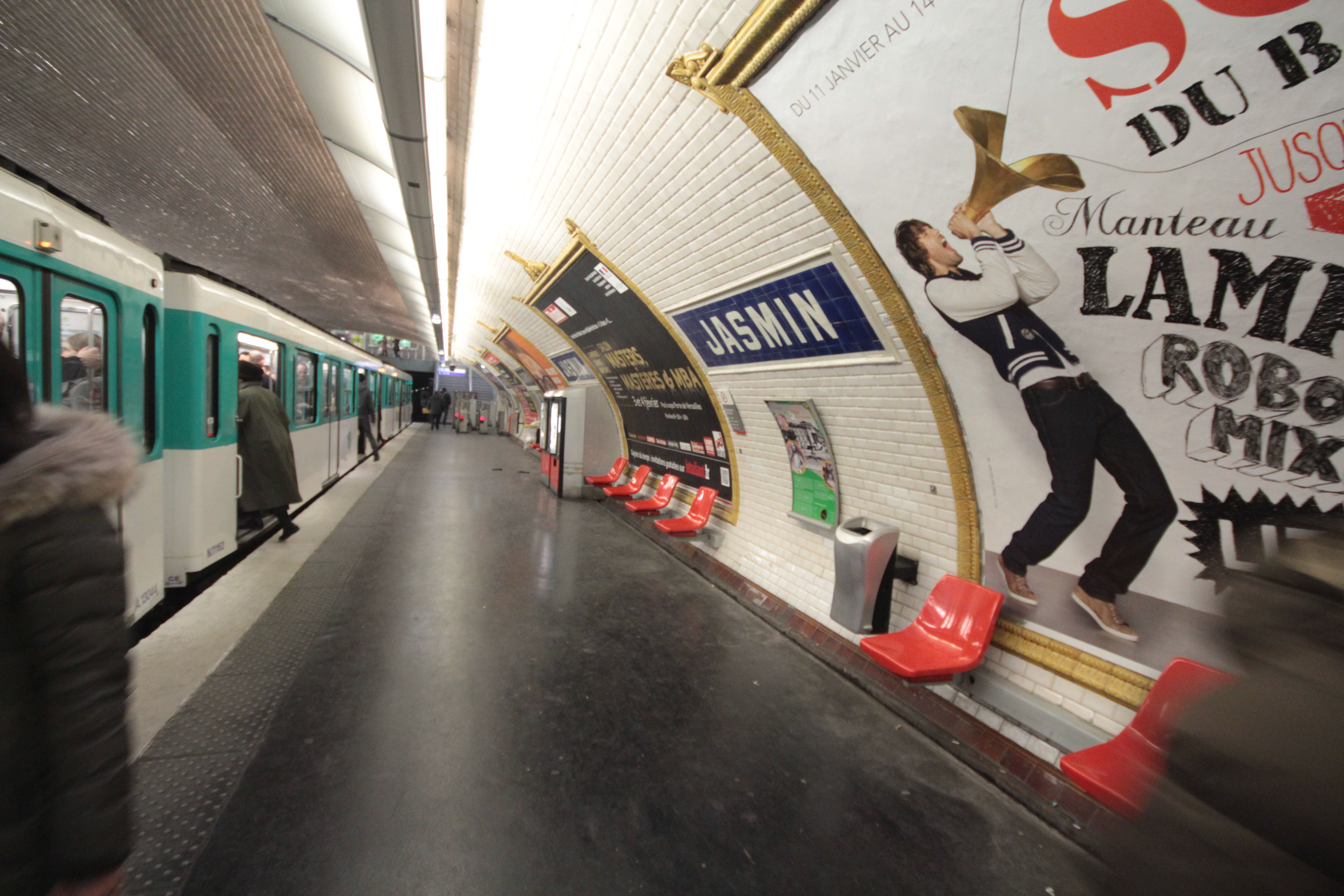
Station platforms

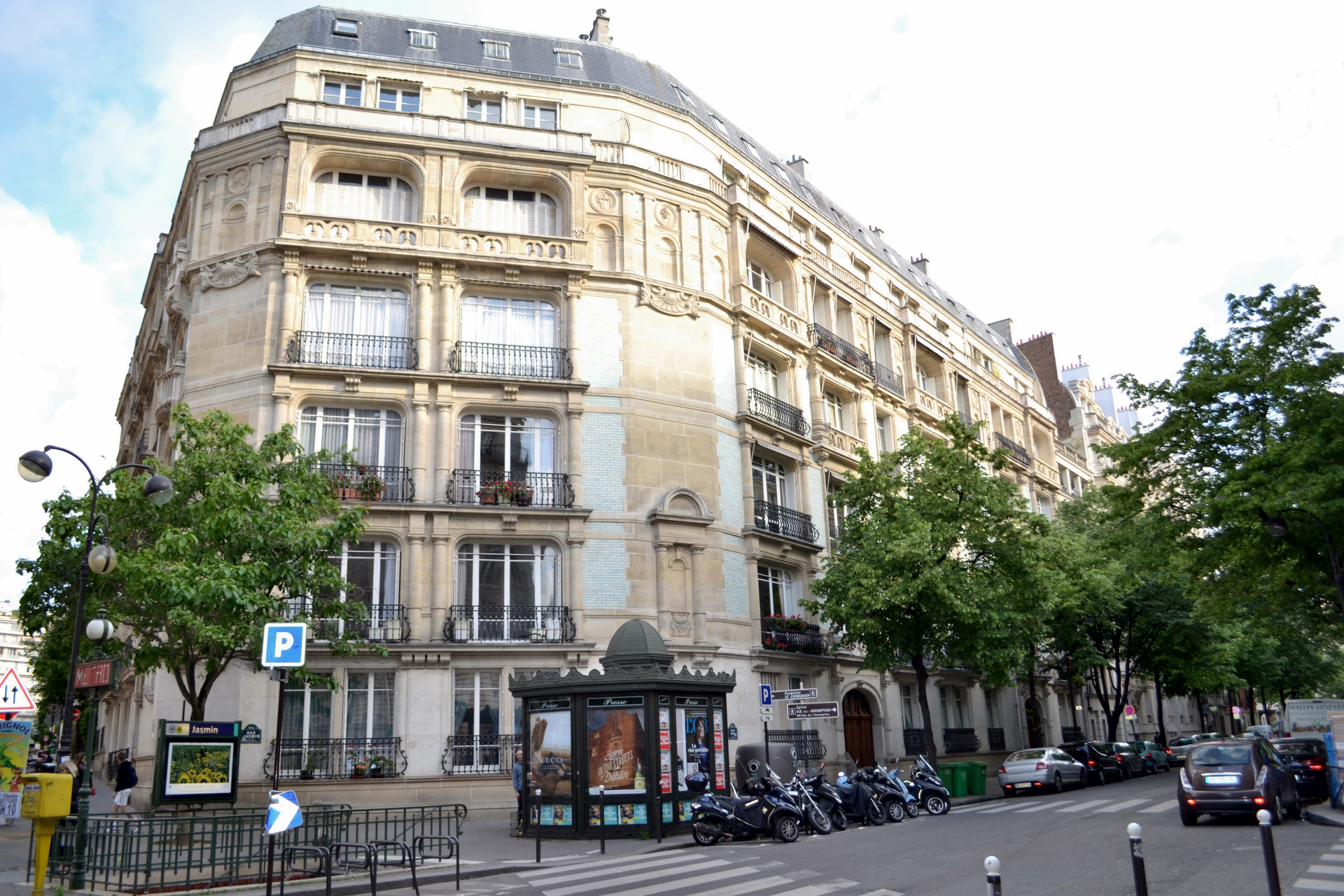
Station entrance on Avenue Mozart
