= Ranelagh Gardens =

Pleasure gardens in 18th-century Chelsea, England

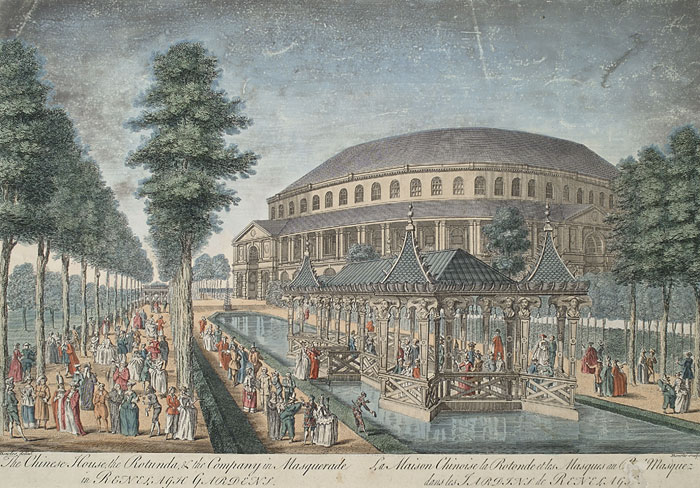
- The rotunda exterior, the "Chinese House", and part of the grounds (engraving by Thomas Bowles, 1754)

- Location of the former venue in London
- Address: Chelsea, London; England, United Kingdom
- Coordinates: 51°29′14″N 0°9′19″W
- Owner: Sir Thomas Robinson
- Type: Public pleasure gardens

Construction
- Opened: 1742
- Closed: 1803
- Demolished: 1805

Ranelagh Gardens (/ˈrænɪlə/; alternative spellings include Ranelegh and Ranleigh, the latter reflecting the English pronunciation) were public pleasure gardens located in Chelsea, then just outside London, England, in the 18th century.

== History ==
The Ranelagh Gardens were so called because they occupied the site of Ranelagh House, built in 1688–89 by The 1st Earl of Ranelagh, an Anglo-Irish peer who was the Treasurer of Chelsea Hospital (1685–1702), immediately adjoining the hospital; according to Bowack's Antiquities of Middlesex (1705), it was "Designed and built by himself". Ranelagh House was demolished in 1805 (Colvin 1995, p. 561). The original Ranelagh (Irish: Raghnallach) was one of the Earl's Irish estates: a similar pleasure garden was opened near Dublin city, and this gives its name to the present-day suburb of Ranelagh.

In 1741, the house and grounds were purchased by a syndicate led by the proprietor of the Theatre Royal, Drury Lane, and Sir Thomas Robinson MP, and the gardens opened to the public the following year. Ranelagh was considered more fashionable than its older rival Vauxhall Gardens; the entrance charge was two shillings and sixpence, compared to a shilling at Vauxhall. Horace Walpole wrote soon after the gardens opened, "It has totally beat Vauxhall... You can't set your foot without treading on a Prince, or Duke of Cumberland." Ranelagh Gardens introduced the masquerade, formerly a private, aristocratic entertainment, to a wider, middle-class English public, where it was open to commentary by essayists and writers of moral fiction.

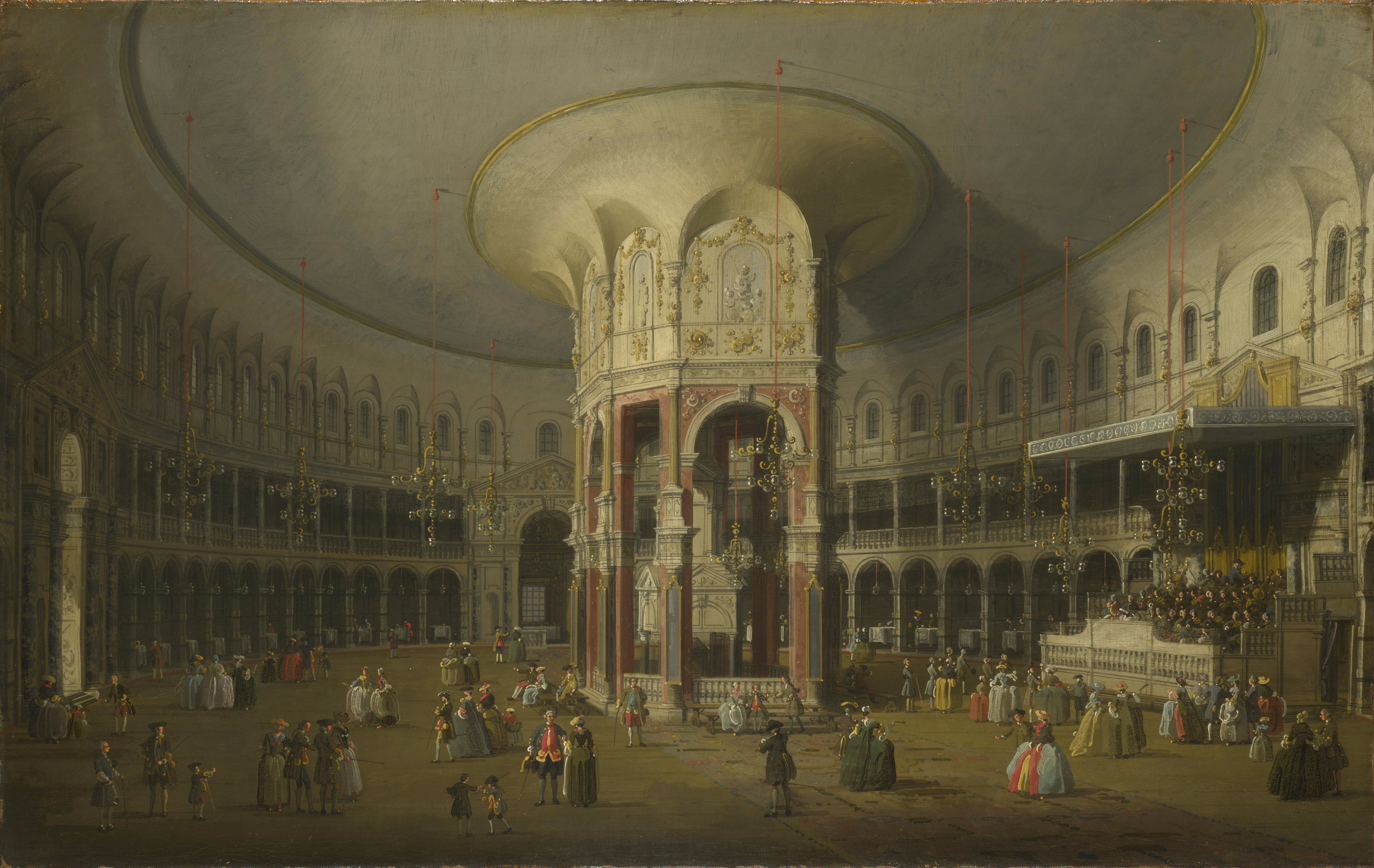
Interior of the Rotunda at Ranelagh as painted by Canaletto in 1754.

The centrepiece of Ranelagh was a rococo rotunda, which figured prominently in views of Ranelagh Gardens taken from the river. It had a diameter of 120 feet (37 metres) and was designed by William Jones, a surveyor to the East India Company. The central support housed a chimney and fireplaces for use in winter. From its opening, the Rotunda at Ranelagh Gardens was an important venue for musical concerts. In 1765, the nine-year-old Mozart performed in this showplace. Canaletto painted the gardens, and painted the interior of the Rotunda twice, for different patrons. The rotunda was closed in 1803 and demolished two years later. The organ was moved to All Saints Church, Evesham.

There was also a Chinese pavilion, which was added in 1750, an ornamental lake and several walks. Ranelagh was a popular venue for romantic assignations. Edward Gibbon wrote that it was, "the most convenient place for courtships of every kind — the best market we have in England."

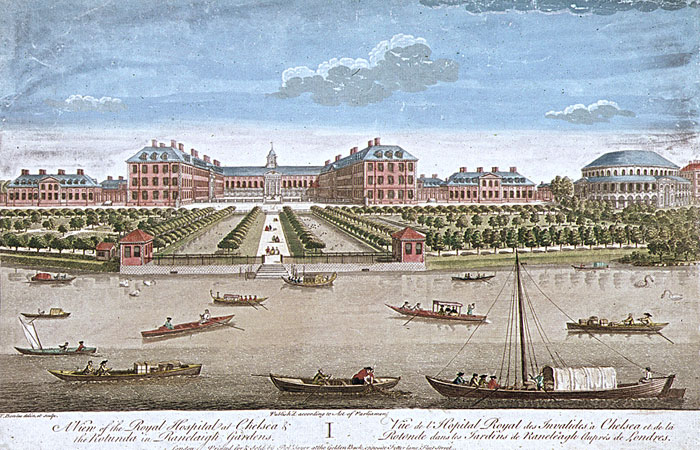
The relation of "Ranelaigh Gardens" (right) and the Royal Hospital Chelsea shown in another engraving by Thomas Bowles.

Oh, What a Charming Thing's a Battle!
"Oh, What a Charming Thing's a Battle!", from Charles Dibdin and Isaac Bickerstaff's The Recruiting Serjeant (1770), which premièred at Ranelagh Gardens. Sung by Leon Lishner.

Such was the renown of the gardens and the vogue for music in the open air (the eight year-old Wolfgang Mozart played a charity performance there on 29 June 1764) that a New York Ranelagh Gardens was opened in New York, in the former Rutgers house, as a rival to the New York Vauxhall Gardens; its proprietor John Kenzie posted an advertisement for it during the occupation of the city in the American Revolution, in hopes of attracting the British soldiers, as well as "the Respectable Public", and a Jardin du Ranelagh was created in Paris's fashionable 16th arrondissement in 1870.

Ranelagh Gardens were redesigned by John Gibson in the 19th century. It is now a green pleasure ground with shaded walks, part of the grounds of Chelsea Hospital and the site of the annual Chelsea Flower Show.

== See also ==
- Cremorne Gardens – a mid-19th-century public garden. Also in Chelsea, but at the opposite end of the district.
- Ranelagh – a Dublin suburb in which was once located pleasure gardens similar to those in Ranelagh Gardens, London.
- Chelsea Bridge Road – next to Ranelagh Gardens
- Jardin du Ranelagh
- Ranelagh station
