= Rue de la Pompe station =

Metro station in Paris, France

Rue de la Pompe
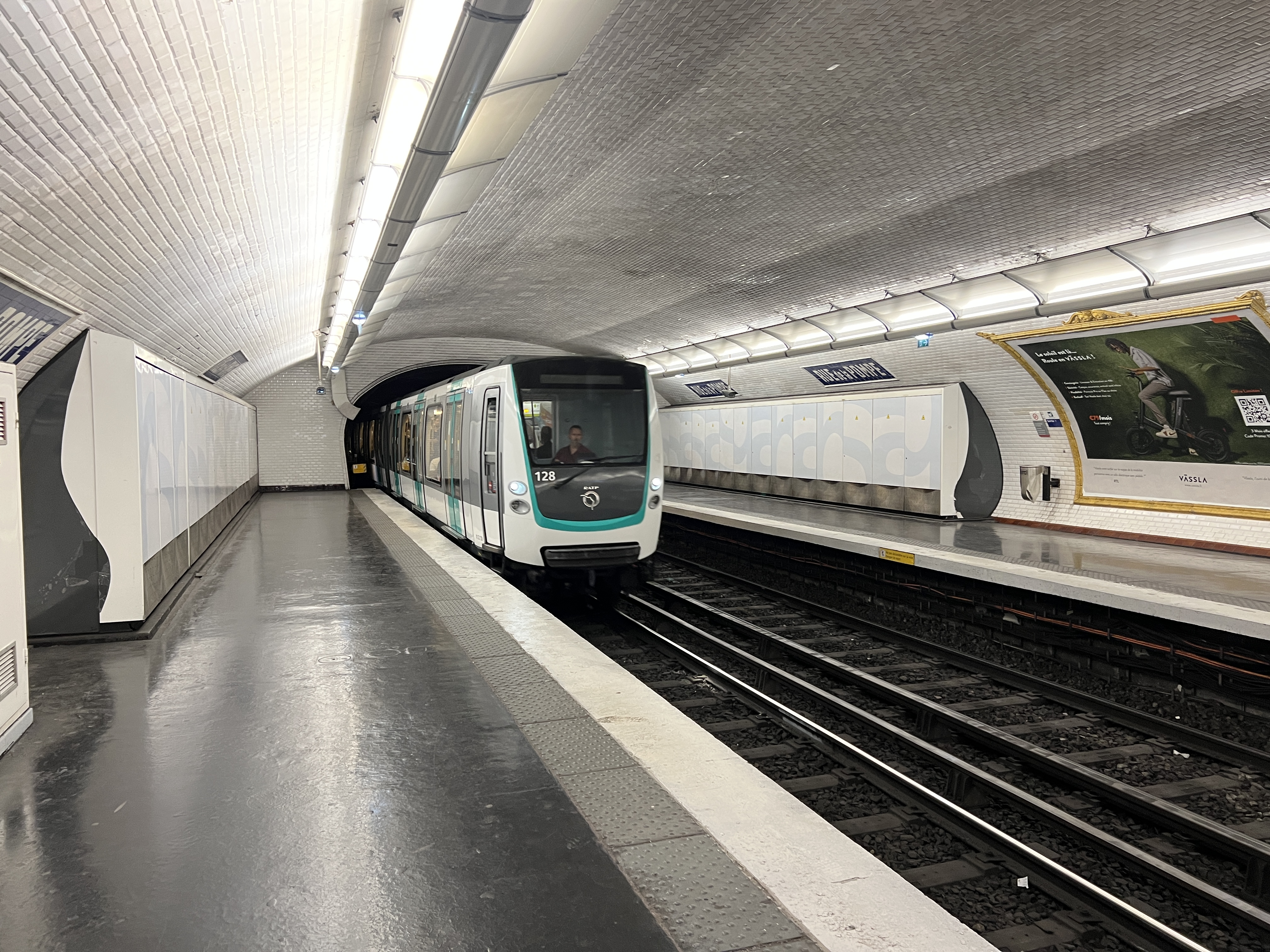

General information
- Location: 16th arrondissement of Paris; Île-de-France; France
- Coordinates: 48°51′50″N 2°16′45″E
- System: Paris Métro station
- Owner: RATP
- Operator: RATP

Other information
- Fare zone: 1

History
- Opened: 8 November 1922

Services
Preceding station	Paris Metro	Following station
La Muette towards Pont de Sèvres	Line 9	Trocadéro towards Mairie de Montreuil
Location
- Location within Paris

Rue de la Pompe (French pronunciation: [ʁy d(ə) la pɔ̃p]) is a station on line 9 of the Paris Métro, named after the Rue de la Pompe. The station opened on 8 November 1922 with the opening of the first section of the line from Trocadéro to Exelmans.

This Passy street is mentioned in the archives of 1730 as a way of skirting the walls of the Château de la Muette. It led to one of the gates in the wall surrounding the Bois de Boulogne. It was called the old path, but was transformed at the end of the 18th century into a street and was named after the pump (French: pompe) that supplied water to the Château de la Muette.

Nearby are the Lycée Janson de Sailly (a prestigious high school) and the town hall of the 16th arrondissement.

== Station layout ==
Street Level

B1	Mezzanine

Line 9 platforms	Side platform, doors will open on the right
Line 9 platforms	Westbound	← toward Pont de Sèvres (La Muette)
Line 9 platforms	Eastbound	toward Mairie de Montreuil (Trocadéro) →
Line 9 platforms	Side platform, doors will open on the right
