= Iéna station =

Metro station in Paris, France

Iéna
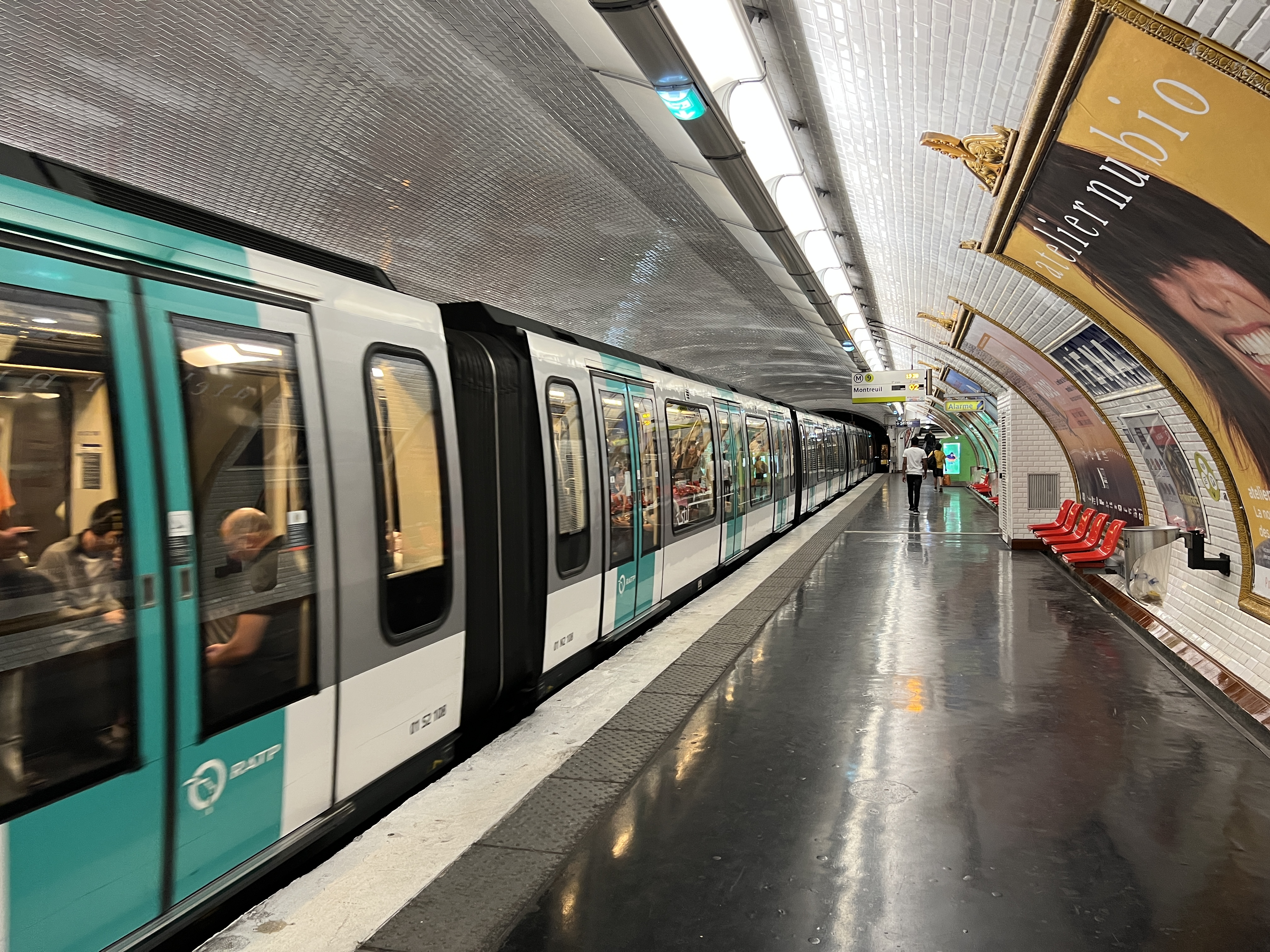

General information
- Location: 16th arrondissement of Paris; Île-de-France; France
- Coordinates: 48°51′52″N 2°17′36″E
- System: Paris Metro station
- Owner: RATP
- Operator: RATP

Other information
- Fare zone: 1

History
- Opened: 27 May 1923

Services
| Preceding station | Paris Metro | Following station |
|---|---|---|
| Trocadéro towards Pont de Sèvres | Line 9 | Alma–Marceau towards Mairie de Montreuil |
Location
- Location within Paris

Iéna (French pronunciation: [jena]) is a station on Line 9 of the Paris Metro, named after the Avenue d'Iéna. The station opened on 27 May 1923 with the extension of the line from Trocadéro to Saint-Augustin. Iéna is the French name of Jena where the Napoleon's army defeated Prussia in 1806 at the Battle of Jena. It is the nearest station to the Guimet Museum (Asian art) and the Palais de Tokyo (contemporary art museum), as well as the Embassy of Mexico, the International Chamber of Commerce, and the Pont d'Iéna ("Jena Bridge").

== Passenger services ==
=== Access ===
The station has three entrances made up of fixed stairs, which have an original balustrade, matching the railings of the Musée national des Arts asiatiques - Guimet located north of the Place d'Iéna :

- Access 1 - Avenue du Président-Wilson - Musée d'Art moderne; Palais de Tokyo, adorned with a Dervaux candelabra, leading to the south-east of the Place d'Iéna, on the odd numbered side of the latter and the Avenue du Président-Wilson;
- Access 2 - Rue Boissière - Musée Guimet, embellished with a Val d'Osne totem, one of the few in the Paris metro to be slightly curved due to its location, adjacent to the museum;
- Access 3 - Avenue d'Iéna - Palais d'Iéna, also equipped with a Dervaux-type mast, located to the south of the square, to the right of no. 7 Avenue d'Iéna.

=== Station layout ===
Street Level

| B1 | Mezzanine |

| Line 9 platforms | Side platform, doors will open on the right |
| Line 9 platforms | Westbound | ← toward Pont de Sèvres (Trocadéro) |
| Line 9 platforms | Eastbound | toward Mairie de Montreuil (Alma–Marceau) → |
| Line 9 platforms | Side platform, doors will open on the right |

=== Platforms ===
Jena is a standard station. It has two platforms separated by the metro tracks and the vault is elliptical. The decoration is in the style used for most metro stations. The lighting canopies are white and rounded in the Gaudin style of the Renouveau du métro renovations of the 2000s, and the bevelled white ceramic tiles cover the right legs, the vault and the tunnel exits. The advertising frames are made of honey-coloured earthenware, and the name of the station is also made of earthenware in the style of the original CMP. The Motte style seats are red in colour.
