= Boulainvilliers station =

Railway station in Paris, France

Boulainvilliers
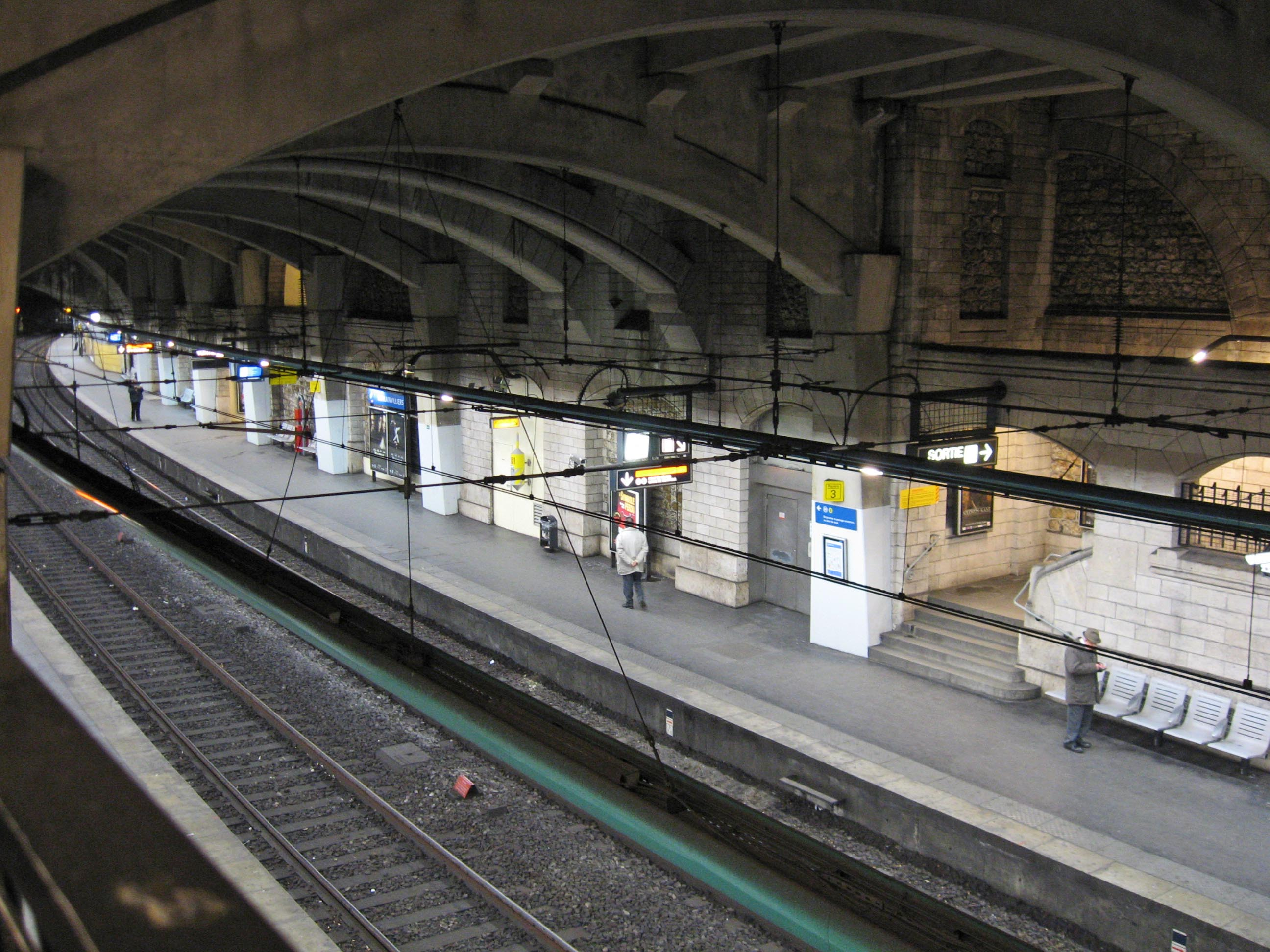
- Platforms

General information
- Location: 52, Rue des Vignes; 16th arrondissement of Paris, 75116; France
- Coordinates: 48°51′23″N 2°16′31″E
- Elevation: 40 m (130 ft)
- System: RER station
- Owner: SNCF
- Operator: SNCF
- Line: RER C
- Platforms: 2
- Tracks: 2
- Bus routes: : 22, 32, 52, 70; : N53
- Bus operators: RATP, Noctilien
Connections
Paris Metro	Line 9 (La Muette)

Other information
- Station code: 87543181
- Fare zone: 1

History
- Opened: 12 April 1900

Passengers
- 2024: 3,034,357

Services
Preceding station	RER	Following station
Avenue Henri Martin towards Pontoise	RER C	Avenue du Président Kennedy towards Massy-Palaiseau or Dourdan-la-Forêt
Location

Boulainvilliers (French pronunciation: [bulɛ̃vilje]) is a station in line C of the Paris Region's express suburban rail system, the RER. It is in the 16th arrondissement of Paris. Boulainvilliers was originally an open air station. The platforms were covered when the line was converted to the RER C. La Muette on Paris Métro Line 9 is connected to the RER station via an underground passageway.

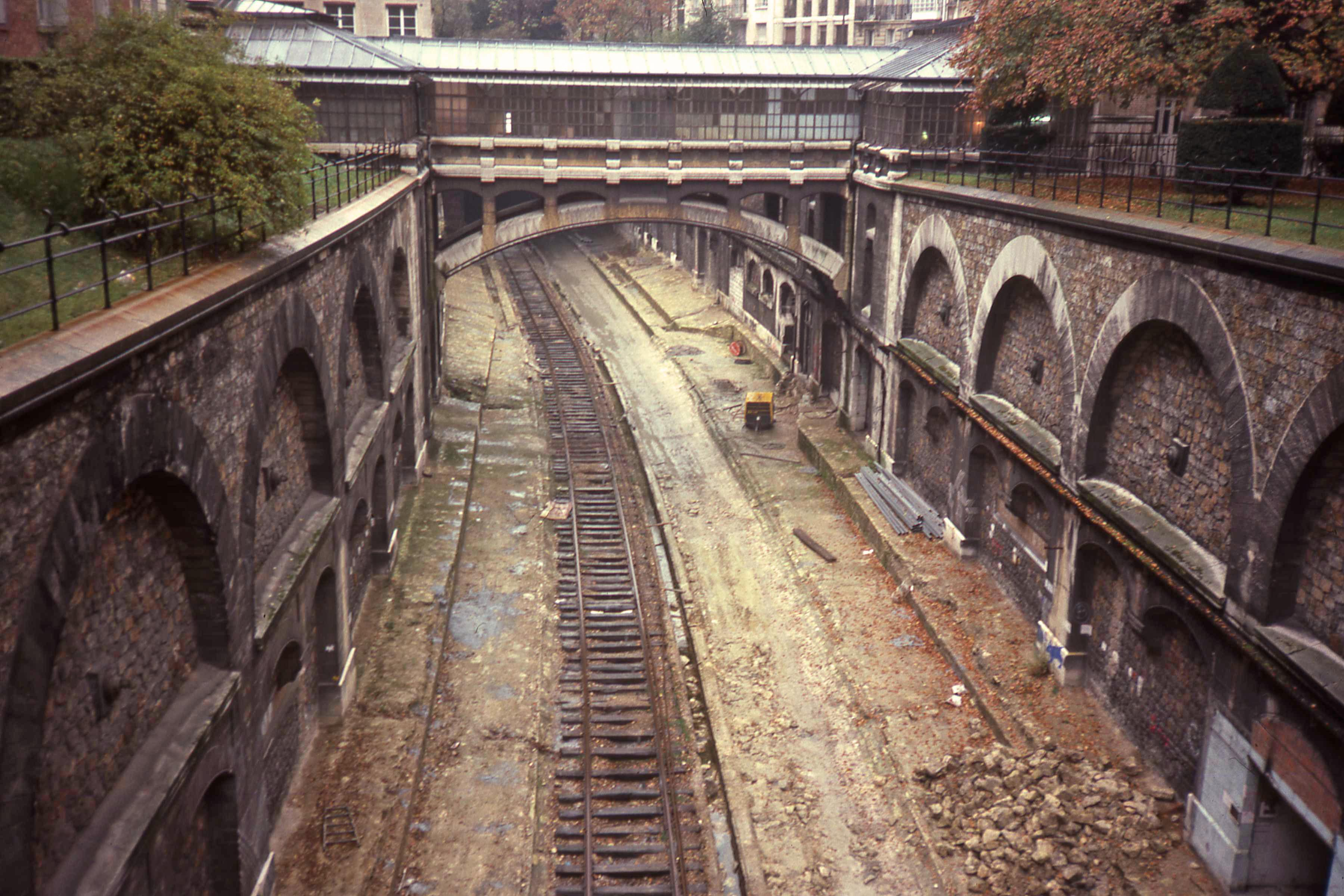
The old rails of the Auteuil line – Champ-de-Mars connection being removed in 1984 as part of the conversion to the RER C. This is at the old Boulainvilliers station.

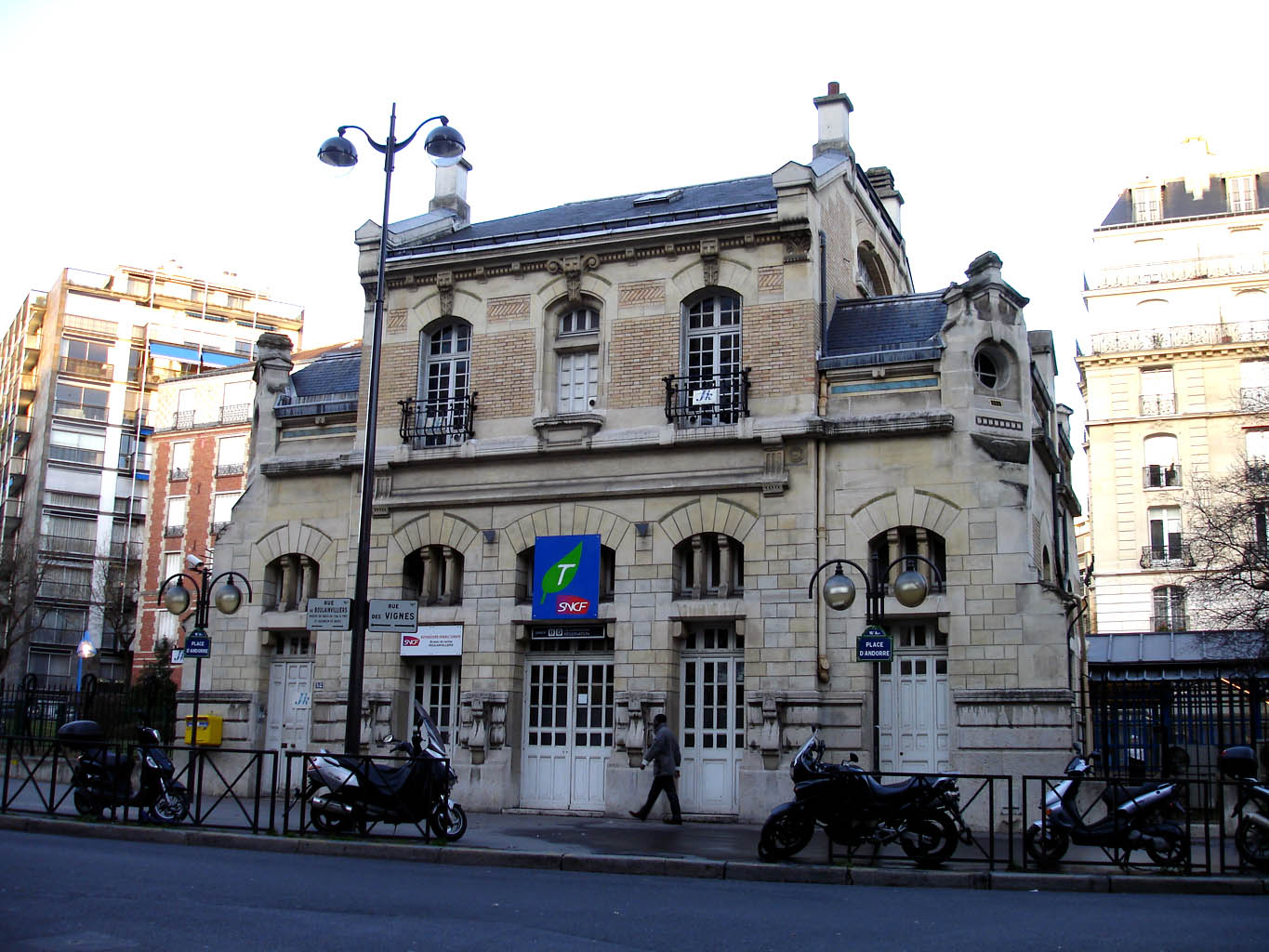
Station entrance

== See also ==
- List of stations of the Paris RER
- List of stations of the Paris Métro
