= Jardin du Ranelagh =

Urban park in Paris, France

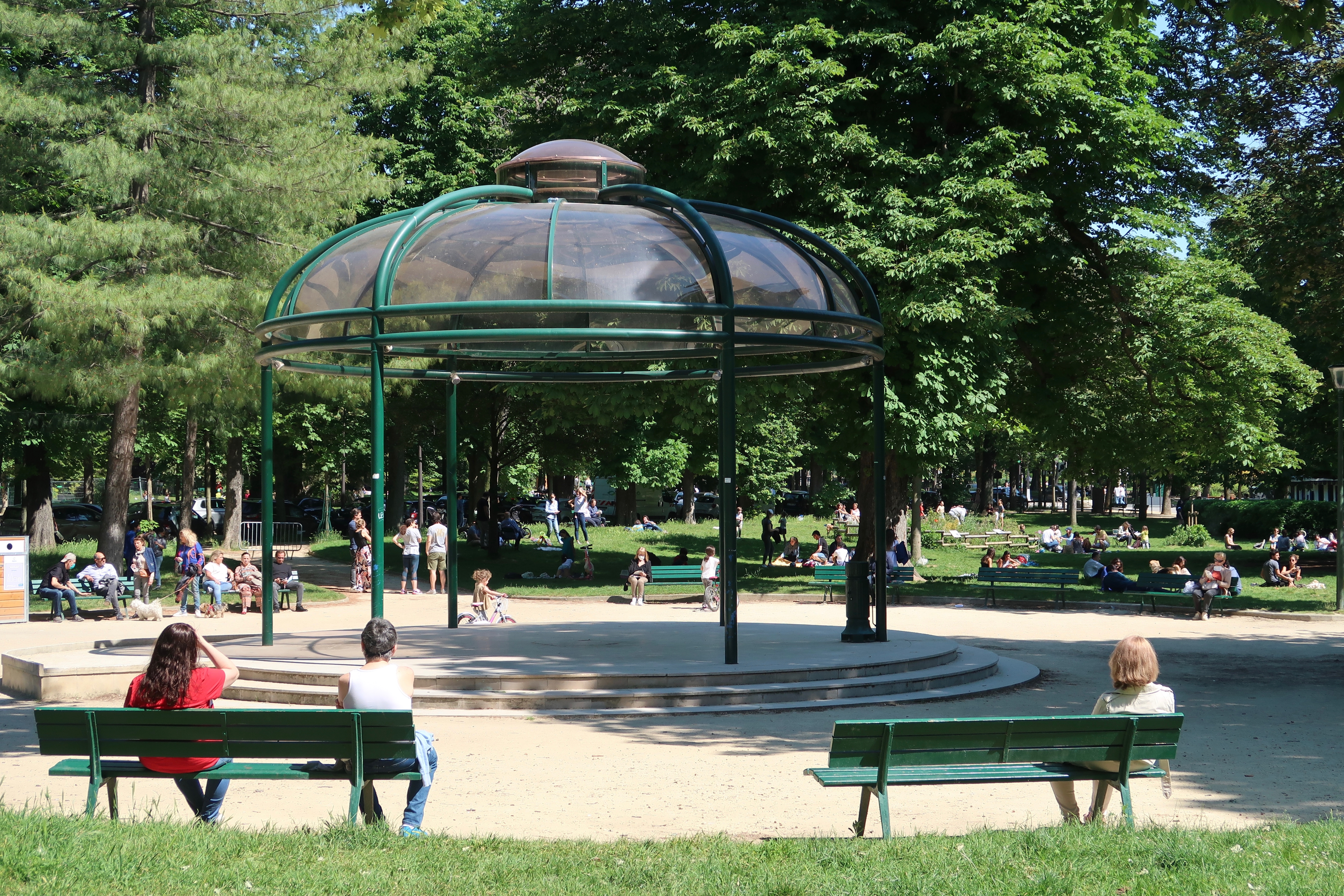
- The Jardin du Ranelagh

- Location within Paris
- Type: Urban park
- Location: Paris, France
- Coordinates: 48°51′33″N 2°16′9″E
- Established: 1860; 166 years ago
- Public transit: La Muette
- Website: Official website

The Jardin du Ranelagh (French: [ʒaʁdɛ̃ dy ʁanlaɡ]) is an urban park in the 16th arrondissement of Paris, France, named after the Irish diplomat and politician Richard Jones, 1st Earl of Ranelagh.

It is an English-style garden designed by the engineer Jean-Charles Alphand, the leading designer of Parisian parks and wooded spaces during the Haussmann era. Its Puppet Theatre is particularly appreciated. On the western side of the garden is the Musée Marmottan Monet. The streets in the immediate vicinity of the garden are also known for their concentration of Parisian embassies and international institutions, along with those around Parc Monceau, making it a popular destination for diplomats.

Unusually for a Parisian park, it is open to the public continuously, even at night. Its relative isolation in the western part of the 16th arrondissement and its proximity to the Bois de Boulogne limit its popularity.
