= Trocadéro station =

Metro station in Paris, France

Trocadéro
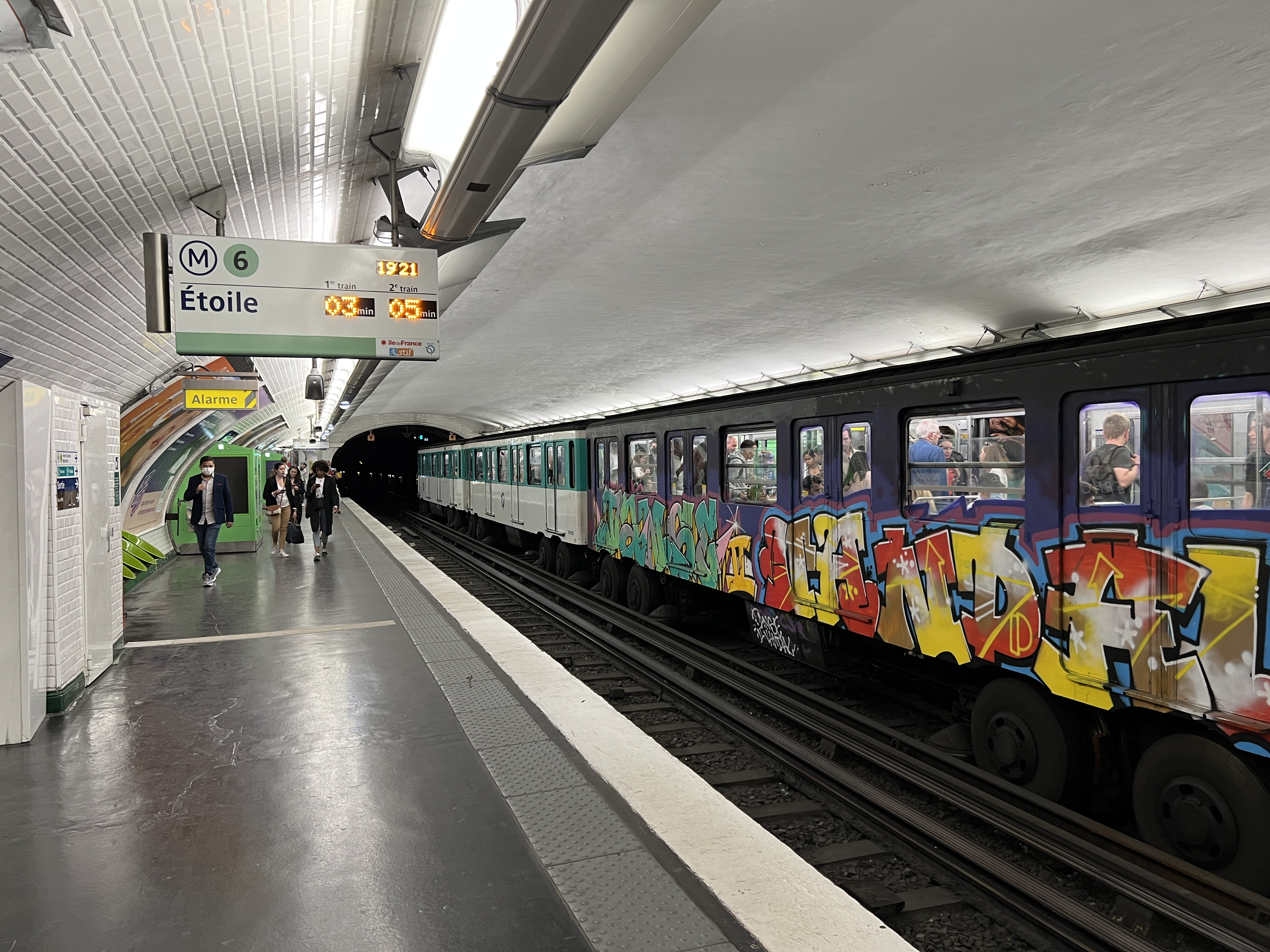
- MP 73 on Line 6 at Trocadéro

General information
- Location: 16th arrondissement of Paris; Île-de-France; France
- Coordinates: 48°51′48″N 2°17′13″E
- System: Paris Metro station
- Owner: RATP
- Operator: RATP

Other information
- Fare zone: 1

History
- Opened: 2 October 1900 (Line 6); 8 November 1922 (Line 9)

Services
| Preceding station | Paris Metro | Following station |
|---|---|---|
| Boissière towards Charles de Gaulle–Étoile | Line 6 | Passy towards Nation |
| Rue de la Pompe towards Pont de Sèvres | Line 9 | Iéna towards Mairie de Montreuil |
Location
- Location within Paris

Trocadéro (French pronunciation: [tʁɔkadeʁo]) is a station on Line 6 and Line 9 of the Paris Metro in the 16th arrondissement. It serves and is named after the Place du Trocadéro.

== History ==
The station opened on 2 October 1900 as a branch of Line 1 from Étoile to Trocadéro. On 5 November 1903, the line was extended to Passy; the line from Étoile to Trocadéro and Passy became known as Line 2 South as part of a planned ring line around central Paris to be built under or over the boulevards built in place of the demolished Wall of the Farmers-General; this circle is now operated as two lines: 2 and 6. On 14 October 1907, the line from Étoile to Trocadéro, Place d'Italie and Gare du Nord became part of line 5. On 6 October 1942 the section of line 5 from Étoile to Trocadéro and Place d'Italie was transferred to Line 6. The Line 9 platforms opened on 8 November 1922 as part of the first section of the line from Trocadéro to Exelmans.

The Place de Trocadéro owes its name to the fortified position in Puerto Real, on the Bay of Cádiz in the south of Spain, which was captured in the Battle of Trocadero by French troops led by Louis-Antoine, Duke of Angoulême, Charles X's son in 1823. This name was also given to the "Moorish" palace built for the World Fair of 1878. The palace was demolished in 1937 and was replaced by the current Palace of Chaillot.

The station is near the Barrière Sainte-Marie, a gate built for the collection of taxation as part of the Wall of the Farmers-General; the gate was built between 1784 and 1788 and demolished in 1830.

== Passenger services ==
=== Access ===
The station has six entrances:

- Access No. 1 - Avenue du Président-Wilson;
- Access No. 2 - Avenue Kléber;
- Access No. 3 - Avenue Raymond-Poincaré;
- Access No. 4 - Avenue Georges-Mandel;
- Access No. 5 - Cimetière de Passy;
- Access No. 6 - Avenue Paul-Doumer.

=== Station layout ===
Street Level

| B1 | Mezzanine |

| Line 6 platforms | Side platform, doors will open on the right |
| Line 6 platforms | Westbound | ← toward Charles de Gaulle–Étoile (Boissière) |
| Line 6 platforms | Eastbound | toward Nation (Passy) → |
| Line 6 platforms | Side platform, doors will open on the right |

| Line 9 platforms | Side platform, doors will open on the right |
| Line 9 platforms | Westbound | ← toward Pont de Sèvres (Rue de la Pompe) |
| Line 9 platforms | Eastbound | toward Mairie de Montreuil (Iéna) → |
| Line 9 platforms | Side platform, doors will open on the right |

=== Platforms ===
The platforms of the two lines are of standard configuration. Two per stopping point, they are separated by the metro tracks located in the centre and the vault is elliptical.

The line 6 station is decorated in the style used for most metro stations. The lighting canopies are white and rounded in the Gaudin style of the 2000s metro revival, and the bevelled white ceramic tiles cover the walls and tunnel exits. The vault is coated and painted white. The advertising frames are made of white ceramic and the name of the station is inscribed in Parisine font on enamelled plaques. The seats are the Akiko style in green.

The platforms of line 9 are furnished in the Andreu-Motte style with two green light canopies, while the benches, the tunnel exits and outlets of the corridors are treated in flat green tiles and Motte seats of the same colour. This decoration is married with the white flat tiles applied to the walls and vault. The advertisements are devoid of frames and the name of the station is written in Parisine font on enamelled plates. It is one of the few stations to still have the entire Andreu-Motte layout.

The name of the station is subtitled Eiffel Tower, named after the nearby Eiffel Tower. This name appears only on the plaques placed in the corridors of line 9 (line 6 already has this subtitle for Bir-Hakeim station).

=== Bus connections ===
The station is served by lines 22, 30, 32 and 63 of the RATP bus network and, at night, by line N53 of the Noctilien network.

== Places of interest ==
The Palace of Chaillot accommodates:

- the Musée national de la Marine (maritime museum);
- the Musée national des Monuments Français (museum of monuments); and
- the Théâtre national de Chaillot.
- the Cité de l'Architecture et du Patrimoine (architecture museum)

The Eiffel Tower and the Passy Cemetery are nearby as well as the Musée du Quai Branly – Jacques Chirac, which now houses many of the objects once exhibited at the Trocadéro ethnographic museum (Musée de l'Homme);

== Gallery ==
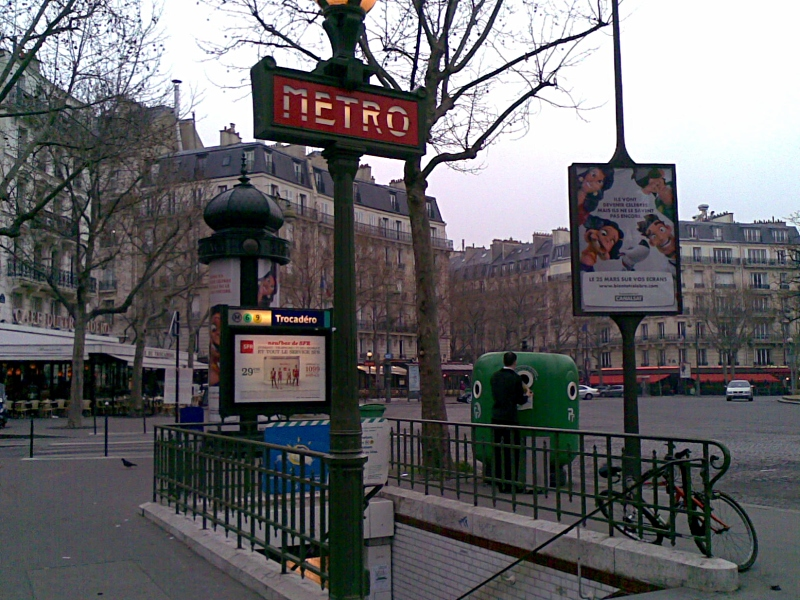
Street-level entrance at Trocadéro

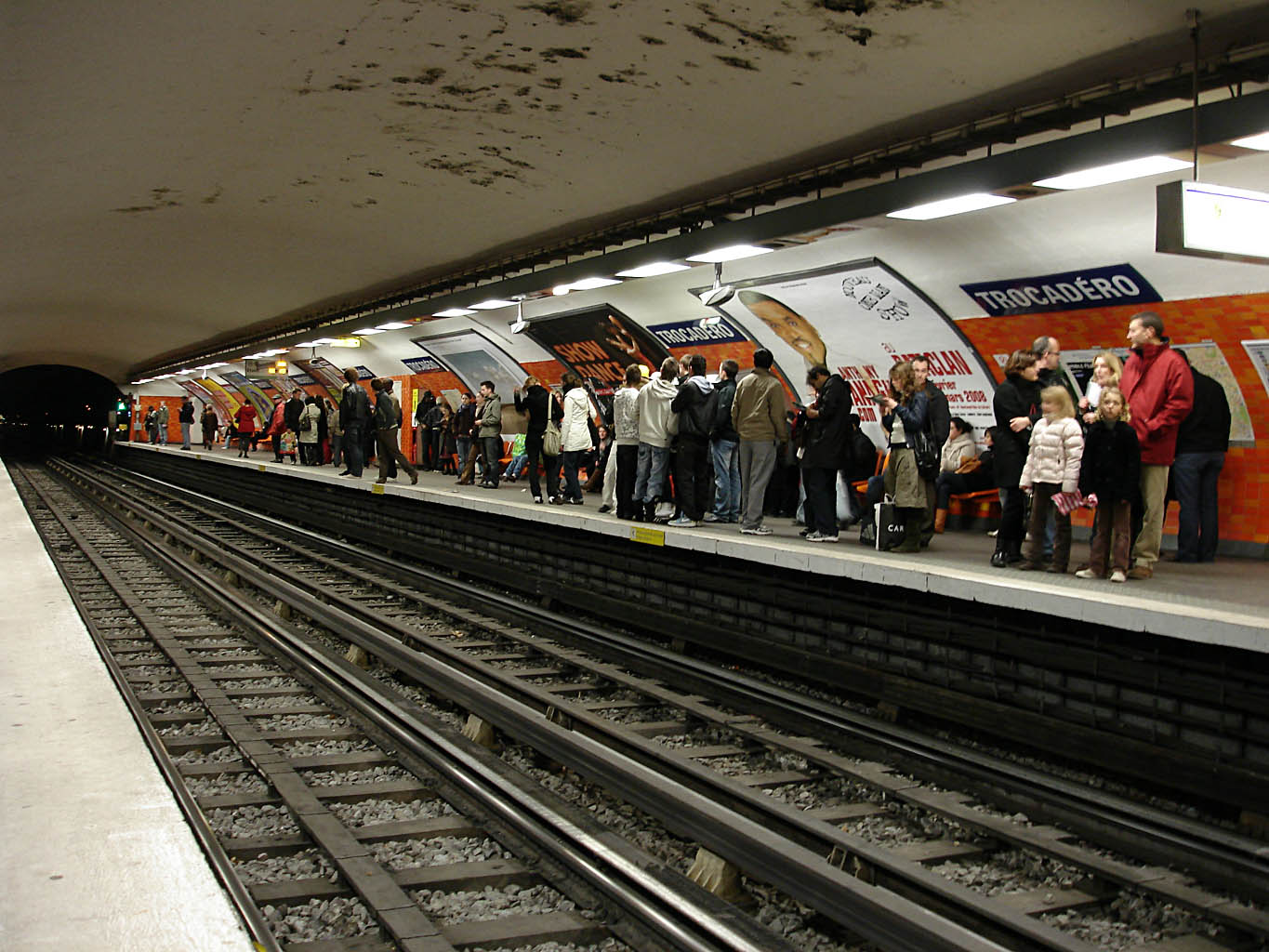
Line 6 platforms at Trocadéro

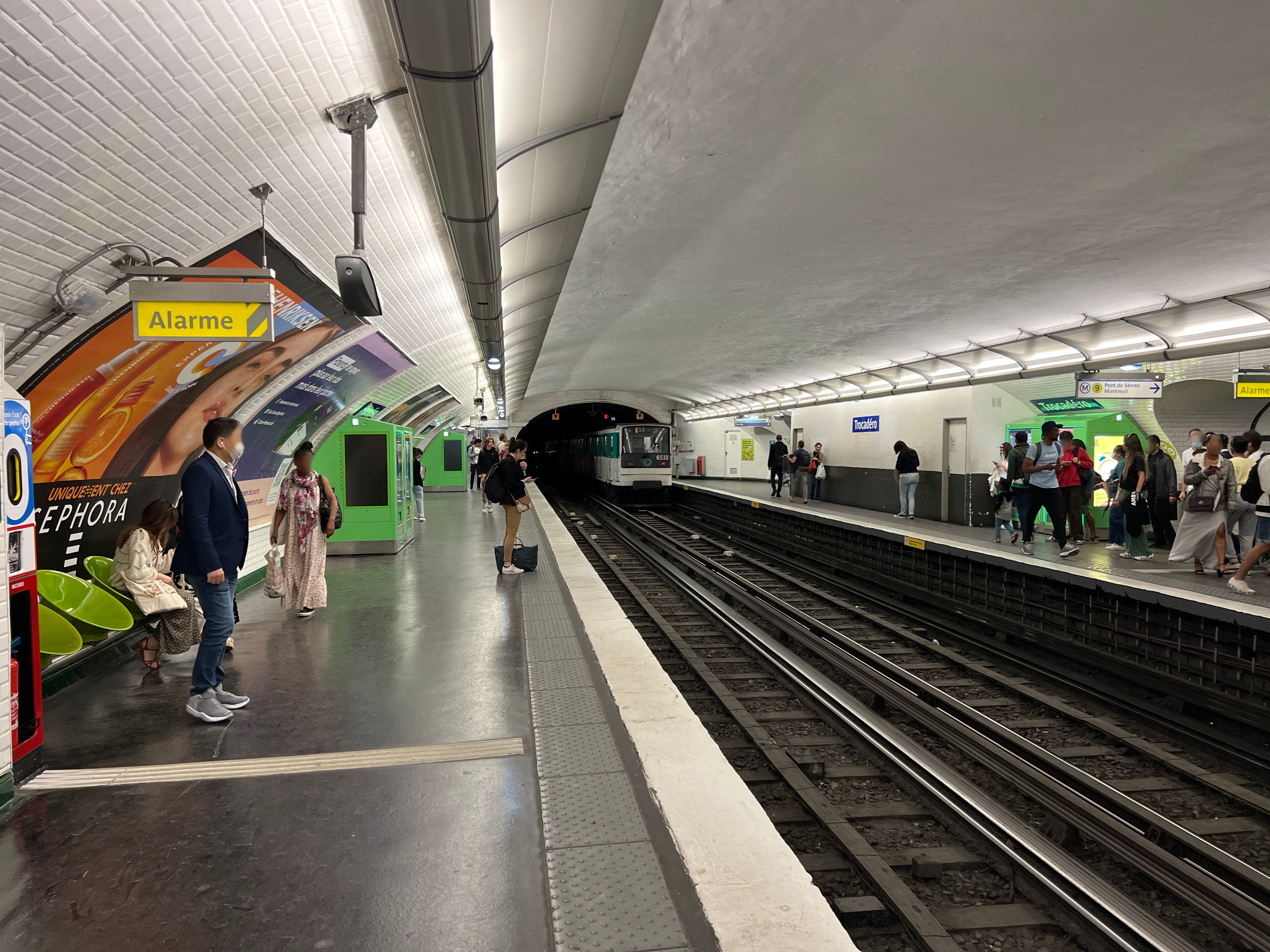
Line 9 platforms at Trocadéro

A MP 73 leaving the station on Line 6.

MF 67 on Line 9 at Trocadéro

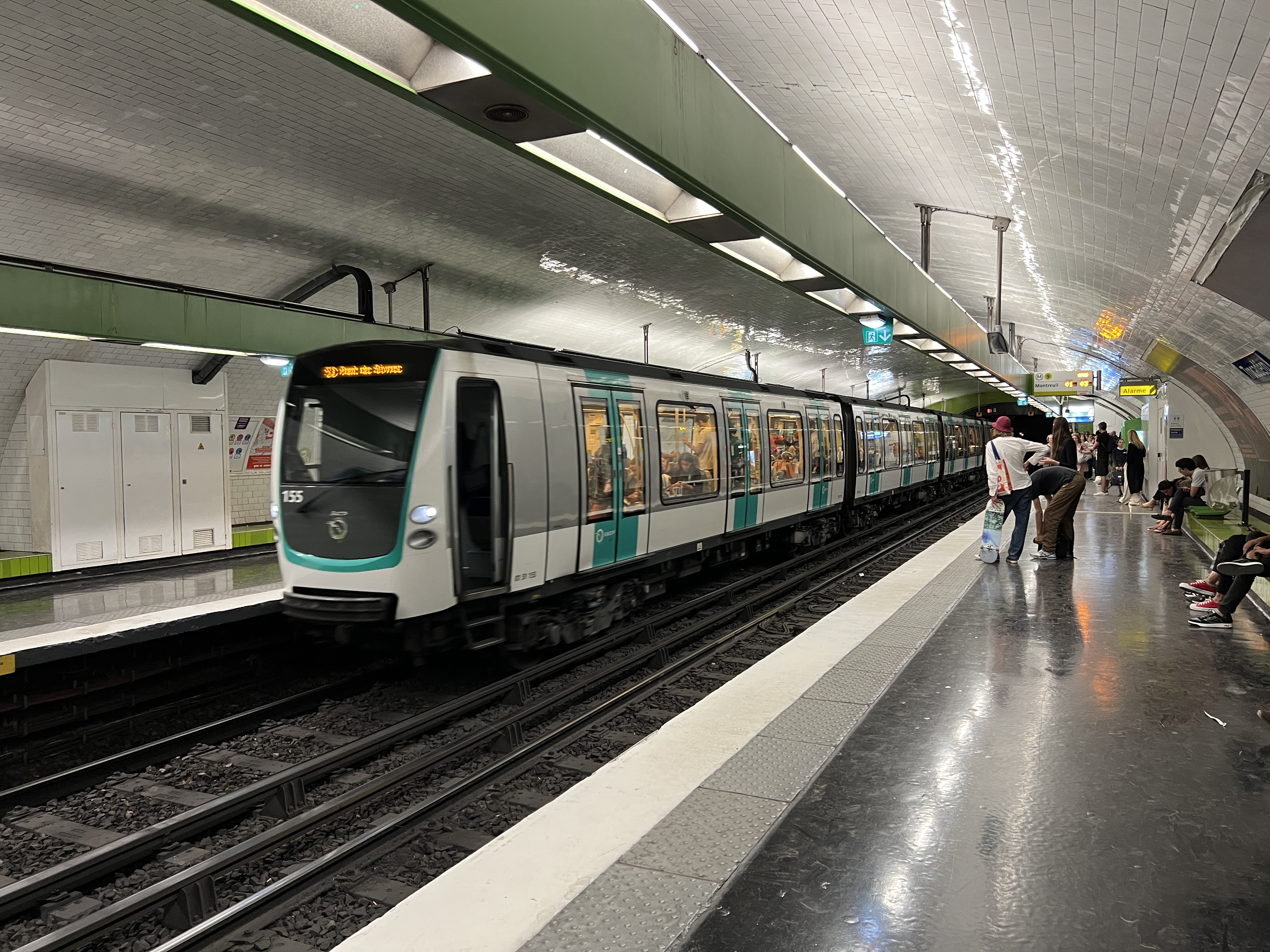
MF 01 rolling stock on Line 9
