= Avenue Henri Martin station =

Railway station in Paris, France

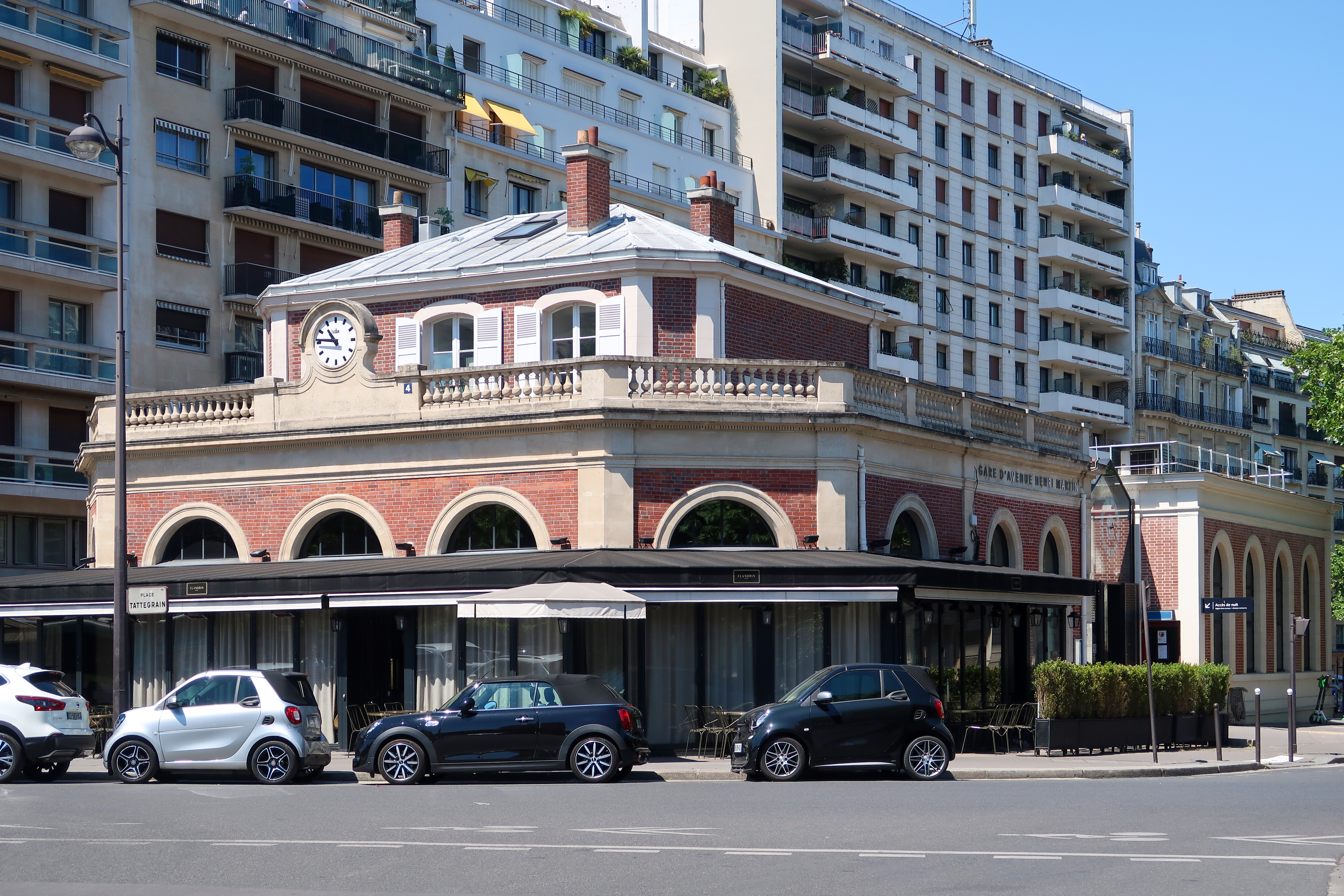

General information
- Coordinates: 48°51′52″N 2°16′20″E
- System: RER station
- Operator: SNCF
- Line: RER C

History
- Opened: 1878
Location

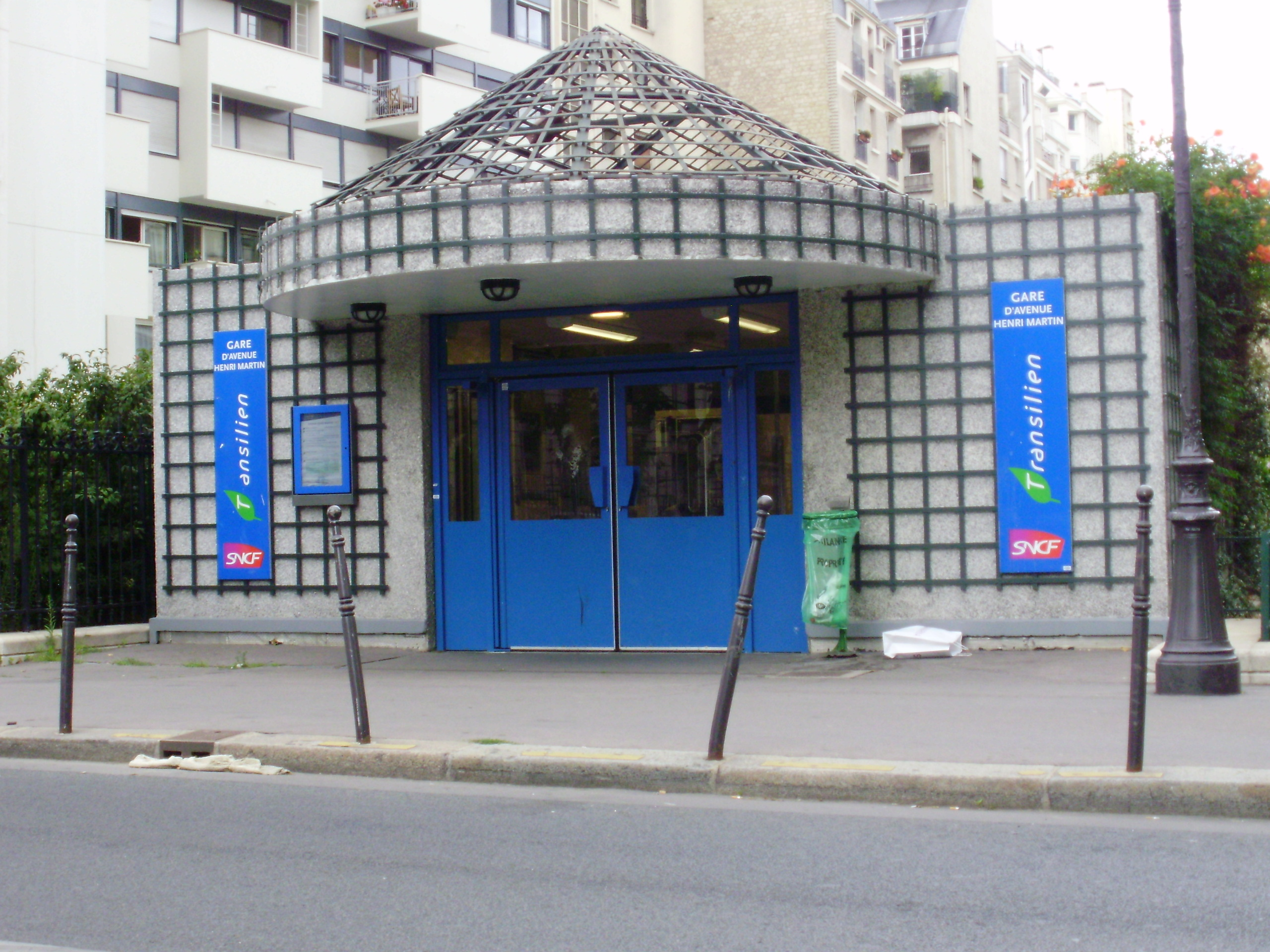
Northern entrance

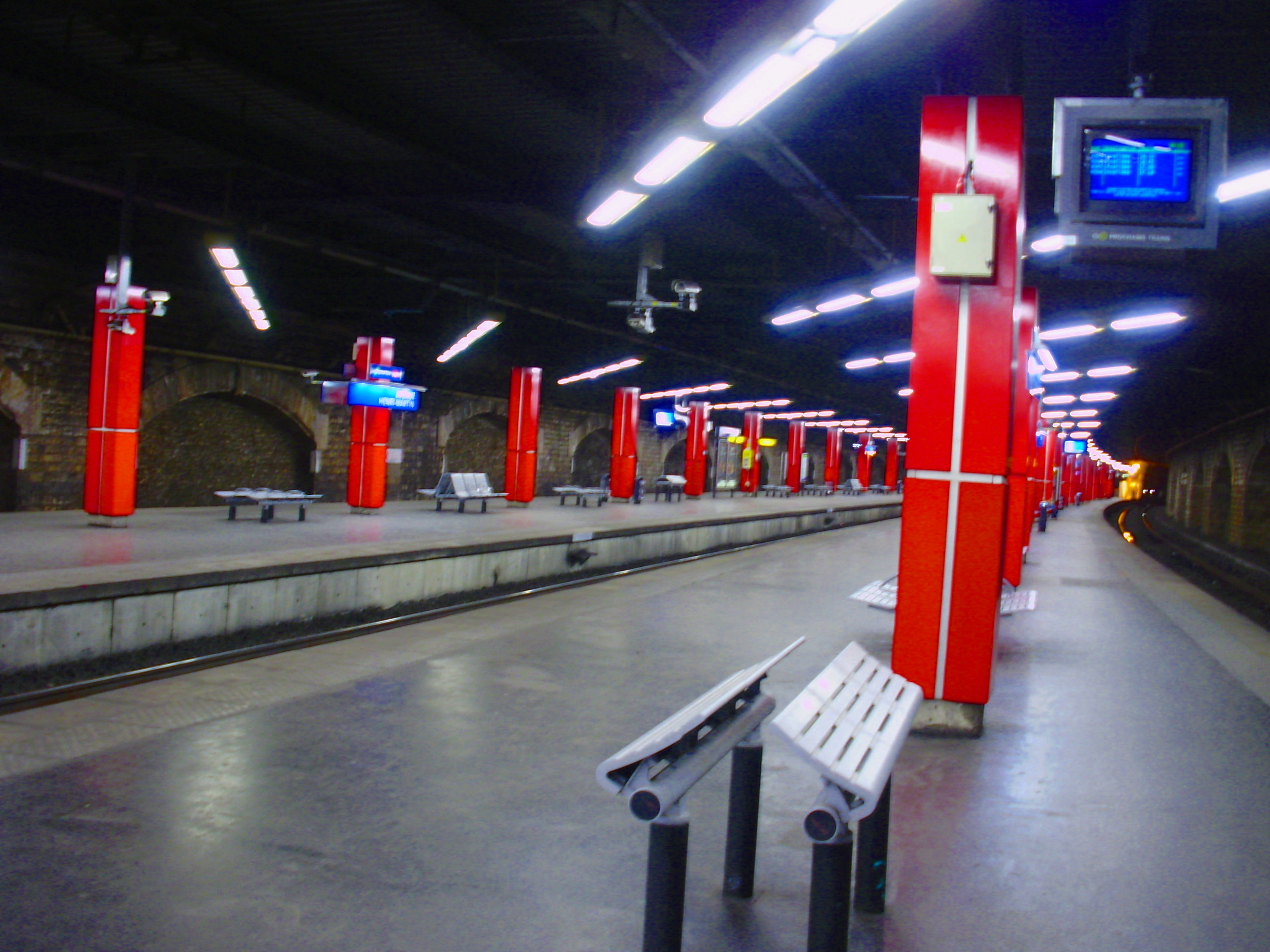
Platforms

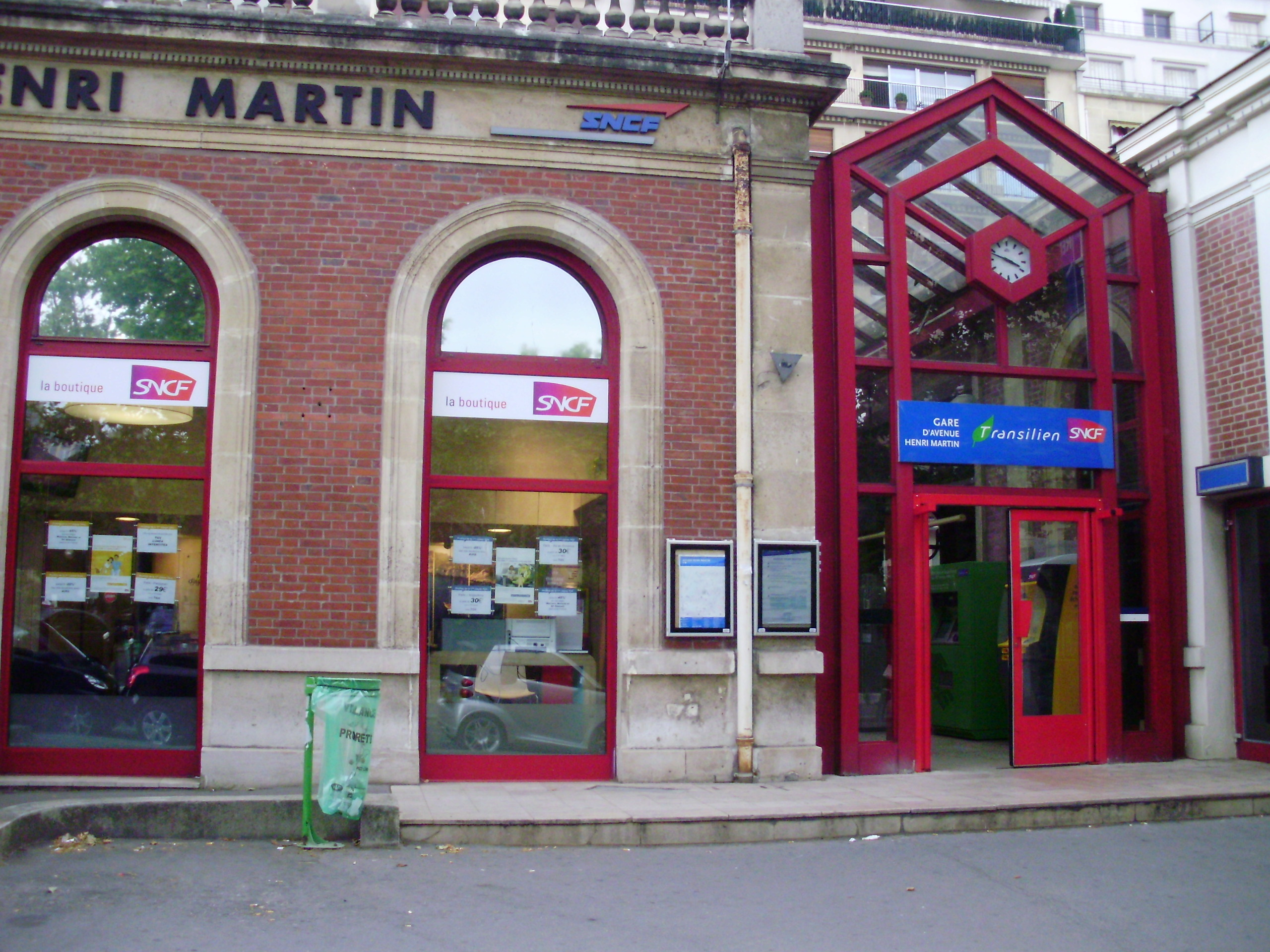
Main entrance

Avenue Henri Martin is a station in line C of the Paris Region's express suburban rail system, the RER. It is situated in the 16th arrondissement of Paris. The station was built for the 1878 Universal Exhibition.

== See also ==
- List of stations of the Paris RER
- List of stations of the Paris Métro

Preceding station	RER	Following station
Avenue Foch towards Pontoise	RER C	Boulainvilliers towards Massy-Palaiseau or Dourdan-la-Forêt
