= Avenue du Président Kennedy station =

Railway station in Paris, France

Avenue du Président Kennedy
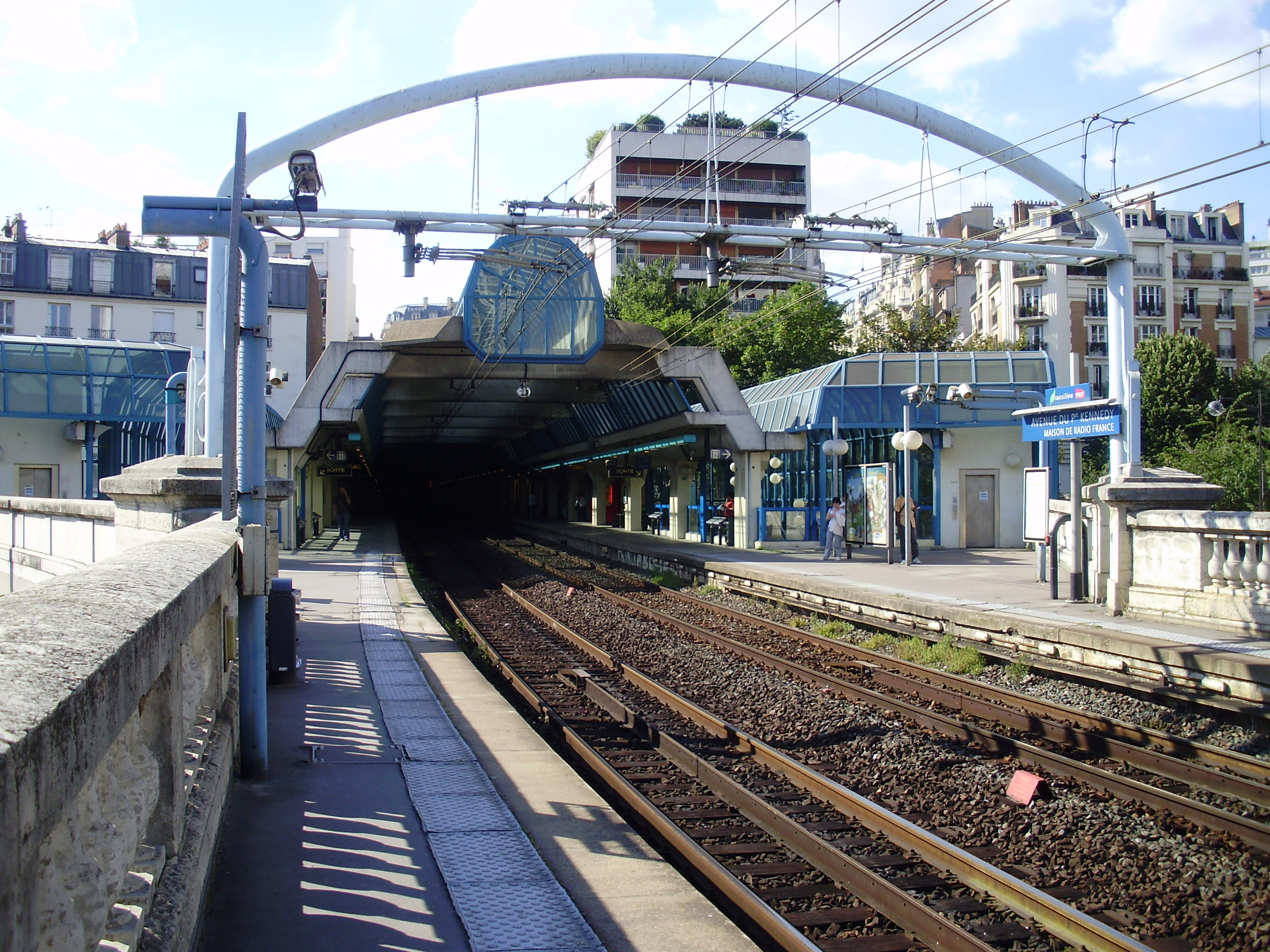
- Platforms

General information
- Other names: Maison de Radio-France
- Location: 6, rue du Ranelagh; 16th arrondissement of Paris, 75016; France
- Coordinates: 48°51′11″N 2°16′48″E
- Elevation: 37 m (121 ft)
- Owner: SNCF
- Operator: SNCF
- Line: RER C
- Platforms: 2
- Tracks: 2
- Bus routes: : 70, 72; : N12, N61
- Bus operators: RATP, Noctilien

Construction
- Structure type: Elevated

Other information
- Station code: 87543207
- Fare zone: 1

History
- Opened: 1988

Passengers
- 2024: 1,718,808

Services
Preceding station	RER	Following station
Boulainvilliers towards Pontoise	RER C	Champ de Mars–Tour Eiffel towards Massy-Palaiseau or Dourdan-la-Forêt
Location

Avenue du Président Kennedy is a station in line C of the Paris Region's express suburban rail system, the RER. It is situated in the 16th arrondissement of Paris, near the Musée de Radio France.

== See also ==
- List of stations of the Paris RER
- List of stations of the Paris Métro
