= Paris Metro Line 9 =

Subway route in the French capital

Line 9
- Paris Metro Line 9
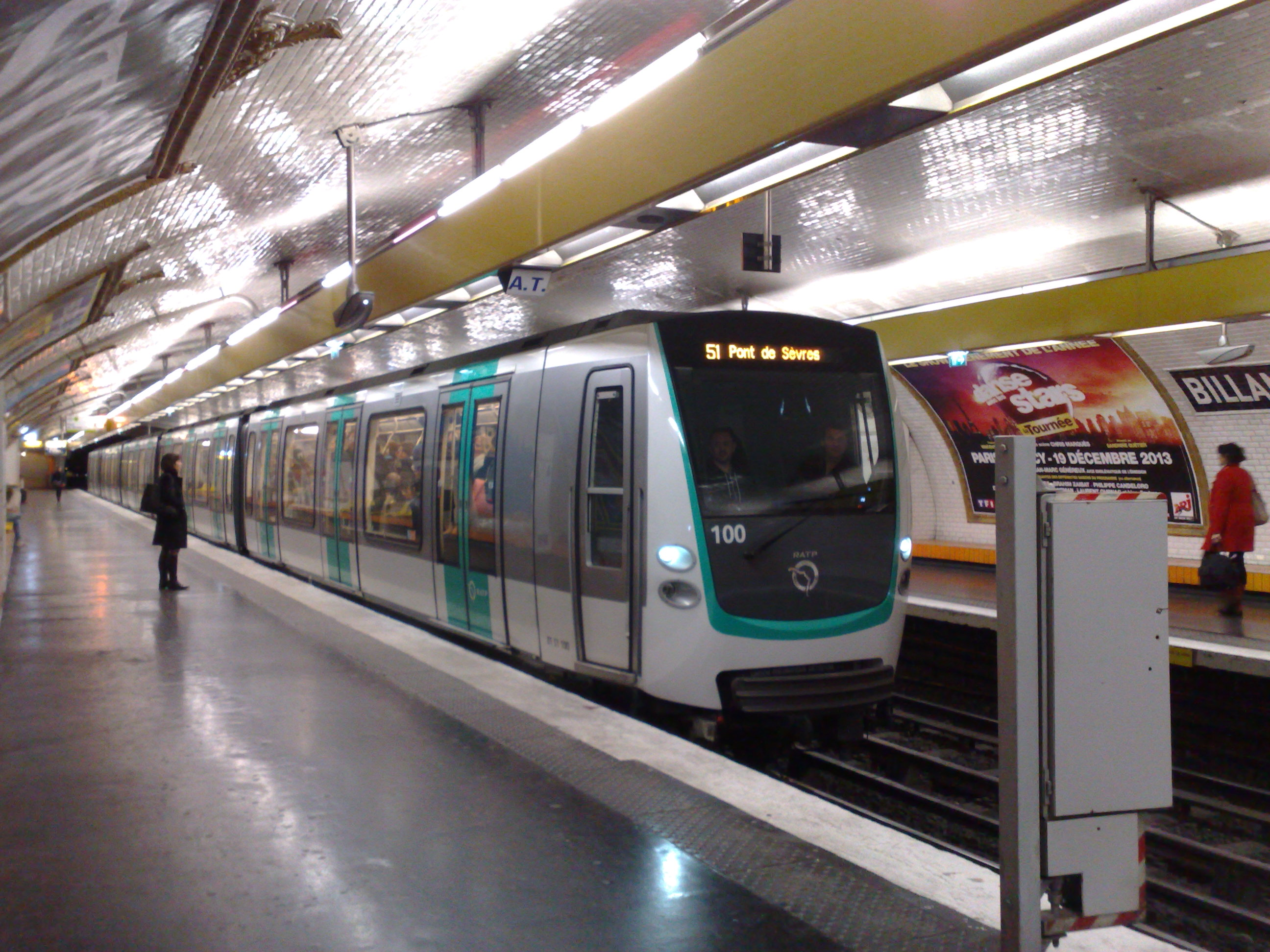
- An MF 01 stock train at Billancourt

Overview
- Locale: 3 communes
- Termini: Pont de Sèvres; Mairie de Montreuil
- Connecting lines: Paris Metro Paris Metro Line 1 Paris Metro Line 2 Paris Metro Line 3 Paris Metro Line 4 Paris Metro Line 5 Paris Metro Line 6 Paris Metro Line 7 Paris Metro Line 8 Paris Metro Line 10 Paris Metro Line 11 Paris Metro Line 12 Paris Metro Line 13 Paris Metro Line 14 RER RER A RER E Tramways in Île-de-France Île-de-France tramway Line 2 Île-de-France tramway Line 3b
- Stations: 37

Service
- System: Paris Métro
- Operator: RATP
- Rolling stock: MF 01 (74 trains as of 30 July 2023)
- Ridership: 129,000,000 (2025) (avg. per year); 4th/16 (2025)

History
- Opened: 8 November 1922; 104 years ago

Technical
- Line length: 19.6 km (12.2 mi)
- Track gauge: 1,435 mm (4 ft 8 1/2 in) standard gauge
- Electrification: 750 V DC third rail
- Conduction system: Conductor

Paris Metro Line 9 is one of the sixteen lines of the Paris Métro network currently open. It links Pont de Sèvres in Boulogne-Billancourt, the third most populated city in Ile-de-France, to Mairie de Montreuil, the second most populated city of Seine-Saint-Denis in the east, along a parabolic - shaped route through the center of the French capital. With 133,24 million passengers in 2024, it is the third busiest line on the historic network, behind lines 1 and 4, as well as one of the longest. The first of the historic lines not part of Fulgence Bienvenüe's initial project, it is also the very first line of the Paris Métro to cross the borders of Paris and service its suburbs, with the line segment in Boulogne opening in 1934 following three years later by the segment in Montreuil. Since then, Line 9 didn't evolve much in terms of layout.

== History ==
=== Chronology ===
- 4 December 1901: Fulgence Bienvenue's second project, ordered by the city of Paris six months prior with the goal of having not a single house in Paris left more than 400 meters (1312 ft) away from a station, is submitted for approval. Line 9 is the first proposition of this new project.
- 31 July 1909: The second project receives its déclaration d'utilité publique, a pre-requisite before any public project can enter construction in France.
- 1911: Construction works begin.
- 8 November 1922: The first section of line 9 was opened between Exelmans and Trocadéro in the 16th arrondissement.
- 27 May 1923: The line was extended from Trocadéro to Saint Augustin.
- 3 June 1923: The line was extended from Saint Augustin to Chaussée d'Antin.
- 29 September 1923: The line was extended southbound from Exelmans to Porte de St-Cloud.
- 30 June 1928: The line was extended from Chaussée d'Antin to Richelieu-Drouot.
- 10 December 1933: The line was extended from Richelieu-Drouot to Porte de Montreuil.
- 3 February 1934: The line was extended from Porte de St-Cloud to Pont de Sèvres.
- 14 October 1937: The line was extended from Porte de Montreuil to Mairie de Montreuil.
- 2 September 1939: At the outbreak of World War II, service to Saint-Martin ceased. Unlike most other stations, however, Saint-Martin never re-opened due to its proximity to Strasbourg - Saint-Denis (only 100 meters (328 ft) separate the two stations).
- 1970: A centralized command center is inaugurated.
- 1975: Autopilot feature is deployed.
- 21 October 2013: Gradual cascading of MF 67 to MF 01 trains began.
- 14 December 2016: Last ride of an MF 67 train on line 9 before its transfer to line 12.

=== Origins ===
The first line coined in the complementary project, Line 9 was originally envisioned as a branch of Line 2 Sud (now known as Line 6) meant to cover the south of the wealthy 16th arrondissement between Porte de Saint-Cloud and Trocadero. However, it was concluded by the CMP to instead combine this segment with a proposed segment that was to be built towards Opera, and thus Line 9 is created. The first section between Trocadero and Exelmans opened on 8 November 1922.

=== Construction and Extensions ===
Construction of the original sections (as well as the extension towards République) proved to be difficult due to public opposition in the various arrondissements as well as unstable soil above the tunnels. Public support for the line's construction was greatly difficult due in part to proposed sections that various entities saw as impossible to build and operate under government regulations at the time. In addition, unstable soil led to the collapse of several sections of tunnel being constructed. The double-decker tunnel from Richelieu - Drouot to République (which carries Line 9 on the lower level, and Line 8 on the upper level) proved especially problematic due to unstable ground at Grands Boulevards. As a result, this particular section had to be reinforced by central piers.

The first extension into the suburbs, towards Pont de Sèvres, opened on 3 February 1934. On 14 October 1937, the eastern extension towards Mairie de Montreuil opened. Since then, few changes to the line's infrastructure have been made. (from fr:Ligne 9 du métro de Paris)

== Rolling stock ==
Line 9 is operated with the MF 01 stock in five-car sets. Before that, line 9 was the last line equipped of the pre-war Sprague-Thomson-trains, which were removed from service on 16 April 1983. On 9 February 2011, the STIF announced plans to acquire 66 new Mf 01-trainsets. The €330 million order began deliveries during June 2013 and will continue through 2016 to replace the current stock on line 9. The Last MF67 on Line 9 was withdrawn from service on 28 November 2016. On 21 October 2013, the first MF 01 railcar (#096) entered revenue service along Line 9, after spending the course of June through September running along Line 5. The Auteuil workshops, which Line 10 used to share with Line 9, was not equipped to handle maintenance operations for the MF 01 rolling stock, and thus heavy maintenance work was done at the Bobigny workshops along Line 5.

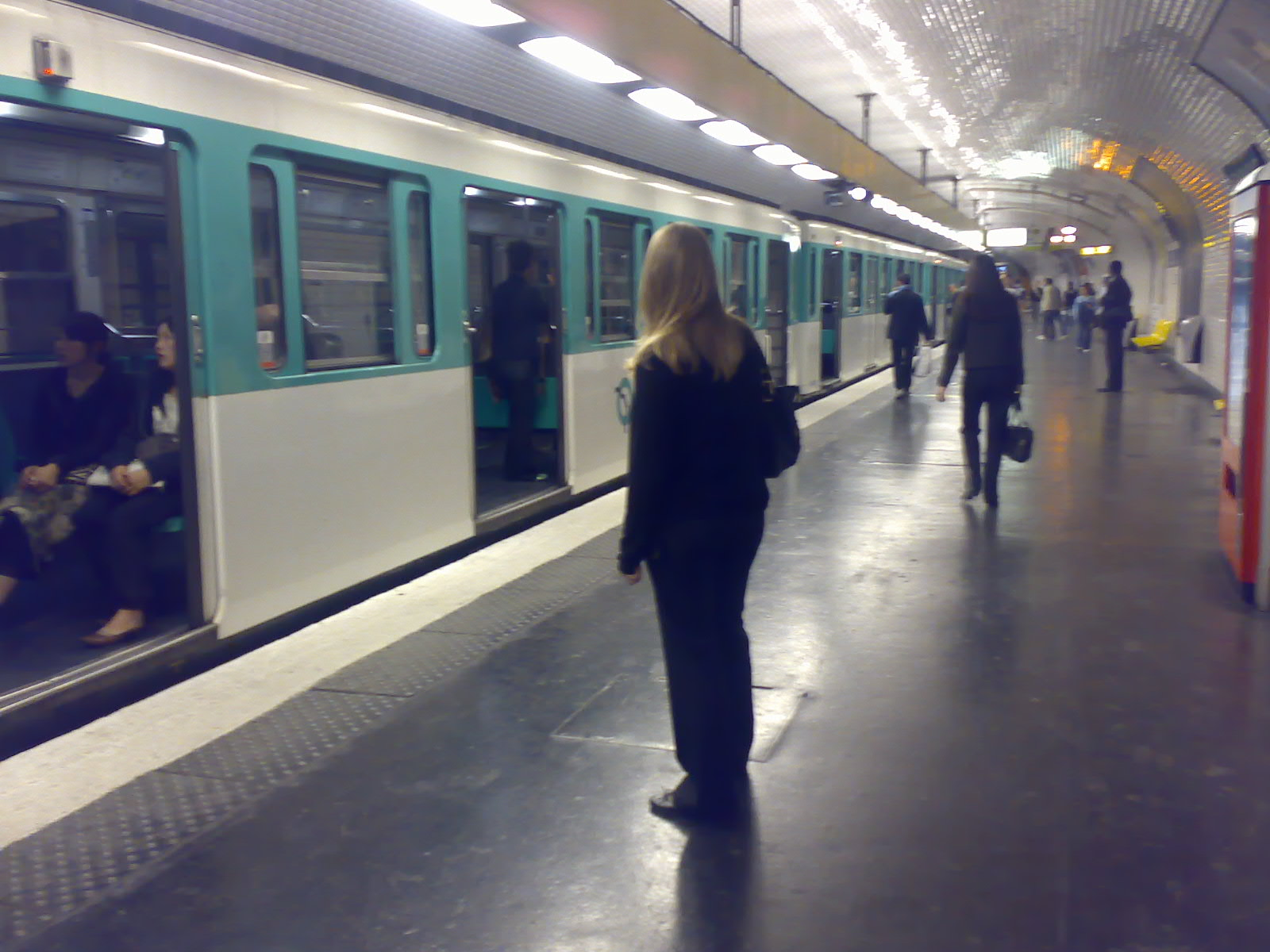
line 9 at République station.

== Renamed stations ==
Renaming date	Former name	New Name	Notes
6 October 1942	Rond-Point des Champs-Élysées	Marbeuf – Rond-Point des Champs-Élysées	
30 October 1946	Marbeuf – Rond-Point des Champs-Élysées	Franklin D. Roosevelt	Changed to honor the American president, who died the previous year.
1989	Chaussée d'Antin	Chaussée d'Antin – La Fayette	Changed in honor of the bicentennial of the French Revolution and the Marquis de La Fayette.
September 1998	Rue Montmartre	Grands Boulevards	The station was tiled as "Montmartre" on opening. To avoid confusion between the station and the Montrmartre district of Paris to the north, it was renamed "Rue Montmartre" in the 1960s and finally renamed again to "Grands Boulevards" in 1998.
September 1998	Rue des Boulets – Rue de Montreuil	Rue des Boulets	This station was sometimes abbreviated on maps and signage to "Boulets – Montreuil." The name was changed in order to avoid confusion with the city of Montreuil itself.

== Route ==
Geographically accurate map of Paris metro line 9.

== Future ==
A two-station extension to Montreuil - Hôpital is planned for the future. The new stations will connect line 9 with tramway 1 and metro line 11.

== Tourism ==
Metro line 9 passes near several places of interest :

- Parc des Princes football stadium, Home of Paris Saint-Germain football team (Porte de Saint Cloud).
- The place du Trocadéro offering a view of the Eiffel Tower (Trocadéro).
- The Pont de l'Alma, where Princess Diana of Wales suffered her fatal crash in 1997 (Alma - Marceau)
- The avenue des Champs-Élysées (Franklin D. Roosevelt).
- Place Saint-Augustin (Saint Augustin).
- Place de la République (République).
- Place de la Nation (Nation).

== See also ==
- Paris
- Transport in Paris
- List of stations of the Paris Métro
- List of stations of the Paris RER
- List of metro systems
- Rail transport in France
