= Théâtre Grévin =

Theatre in Paris, France

Coordinates: 48.8718°N 2.3422°E

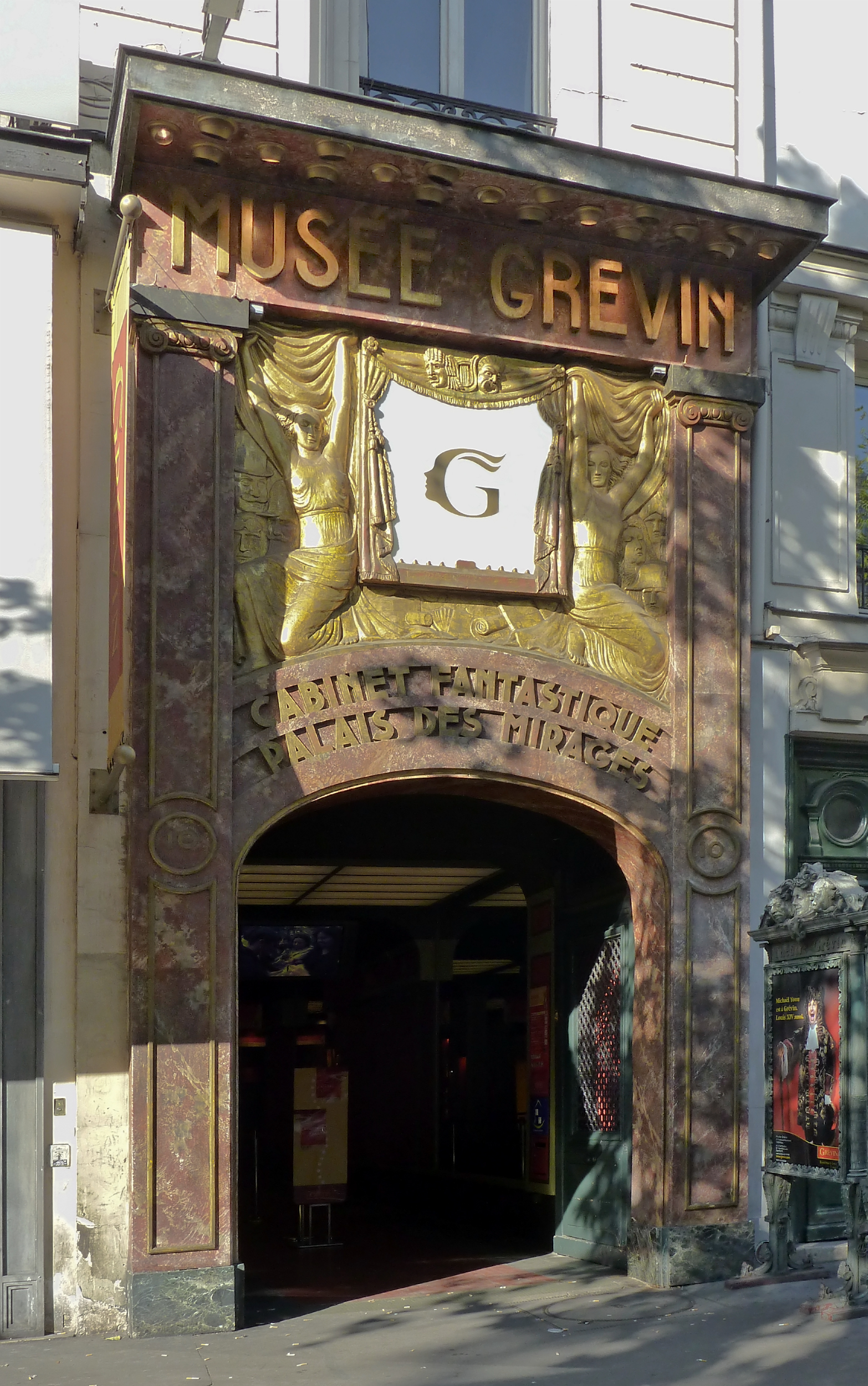
Entrance to the theatre and museum

The Théâtre Grévin (French pronunciation: [teɑtʁ ɡʁevɛ̃]) is a Parisian theatre situated at 10 Boulevard Montmartre in the 9th arrondissement of Paris and located within the Musée Grévin. It also overlooks the Passage Jouffroy.

This site can be reached by the Grands Boulevards métro station.

== History ==
From 1883 to 1900, a small room was used for magic acts, replaced from 1892 onwards by coloured projections by Émile Reynaud called Pantomimes lumineuses, cartoon ancestors.

The current venue, named Cabinet fantastique, was built in 1900 for the Universal Exposition within a complex initiated by the financier Gabriel Thomas and built by the architect Eugène-Émile Esnault-Pelterie, in which can also be found the Musée Grévin, the Palais des Mirages, the Coupole and the Salle des Colonnes.

The famous Georges Méliès, inventor of film special effects, gave performances there. Throughout the end of the 19th century, before Méliès worked for film, at a fixed time during the day, visitors to the museum were able to attend small shows of moving images, magic or ombromania.

It is now included in the inventory of the Monuments historiques, notably because of its stage curtain, an original painting by the famous poster designer Jules Chéret depicting characters from the Commedia dell'Arte as well as a high relief called Les Nuées by Antoine Bourdelle on its pediment.

It features 210 seats, hosts theatrical performances, recitals, press conferences, conventions and screenings.

== Direction ==
The Grévin Museum was run for four generations by the Thomas family before merging with the Parc Astérix SA group in 1999. The new company, "Grévin & Cie", was acquired in 2002 by the Compagnie des Alpes.

== See also ==
- Musée Grévin
