= Jouffroy =

Jouffroy is a surname. Notable people with the surname include:

- Alain Jouffroy (1928–2015), French writer, poet and artist
- Claude-François-Dorothée, marquis de Jouffroy d'Abbans (1751–1832), French inventor
- François Jouffroy (1806–1882), French sculptor
- Jean Jouffroy (c. 1412–1473), French prelate and diplomat
- Quentin Jouffroy (born 1993), French volleyball player
- Théodore Simon Jouffroy (1796–1842), French philosopher

See also

- Passage Jouffroy, a covered passage of Paris, France
