= Bonne Nouvelle station =

Metro station in Paris, France

Bonne Nouvelle
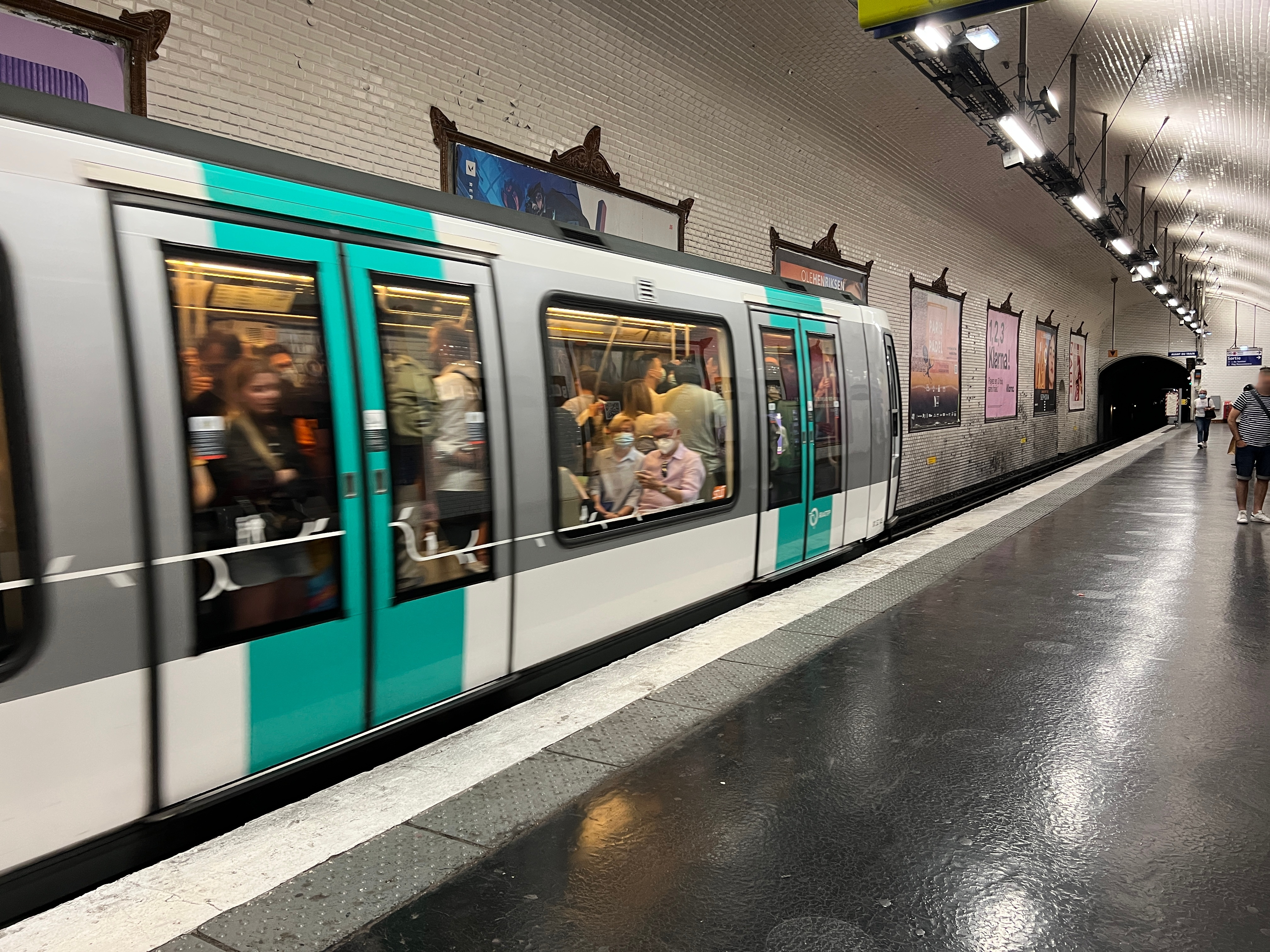
- Line 9 platforms

General information
- Location: 2nd arrondissement of Paris; Île-de-France; France
- Coordinates: 48°52′14″N 2°20′56″E
- System: Paris Métro station
- Owner: RATP
- Operator: RATP

Other information
- Fare zone: 1

History
- Opened: 5 May 1931

Services
| Preceding station | Paris Metro | Following station |
|---|---|---|
| Grands Boulevards towards Balard | Line 8 | Strasbourg–Saint-Denis towards Pointe du Lac |
| Grands Boulevards towards Pont de Sèvres | Line 9 | Strasbourg–Saint-Denis towards Mairie de Montreuil |
Location
- Location within Paris

Bonne Nouvelle (French pronunciation: [bɔn nuvɛl]) is a station on Lines 8 and 9 of the Paris Métro. The section of both lines from just east of Richelieu – Drouot to west of République was built under the Grand Boulevards, which replaced the Louis XIII wall and is in soft ground, which was once the course of the Seine. The lines are built on two levels, with line 8 on the higher level and line 9 in the lower level. The platforms are at the sides and the box containing the lines and supporting the road above is strengthened by a central wall between the tracks.

== History ==
The station was opened on 5 May 1931 with the extension of Line 8 from Richelieu – Drouot to Porte de Charenton. The Line 9 platforms were opened on 10 December 1933 with the extension of the line from Richelieu – Drouot to Porte de Montreuil.

== Name ==
The station is named after the district of Bonne-Nouvelle and Boulevard de Bonne-Nouvelle, both named after the church of Notre-Dame de Bonne-Nouvelle.

== Nearby attractions ==
Nearby are the church of Notre-Dame de Bonne-Nouvelle, the Conservatoire national supérieur d'art dramatique (national dramatic art school), the Grand Rex theatre and the Théâtre du Gymnase Marie Bell.

In tribute to the area's contribution to the theatrical and cinematic arts, the signage for the Bonne Nouvelle station is done up in a fashion similar to the Hollywood sign.

== Station layout ==
| G | Street Level | Exit/Entrance |
| B1 | Side platform, doors will open on the right |
| B1 | Westbound line 8 | ← toward Balard (Grands Boulevards) |
| B1 | Wall |
| B1 | Eastbound line 8 | toward Pointe du Lac (Strasbourg – Saint-Denis) → |
| B1 | Side platform, doors will open on the right |
| B2 | Side platform, doors will open on the right |
| B2 | Westbound line 9 | ← toward Pont de Sèvres (Grands Boulevards) |
| B2 | Wall |
| B2 | Eastbound line 9 | toward Mairie de Montreuil (Strasbourg – Saint-Denis) → |
| B2 | Side platform, doors will open on the right |

== Gallery ==
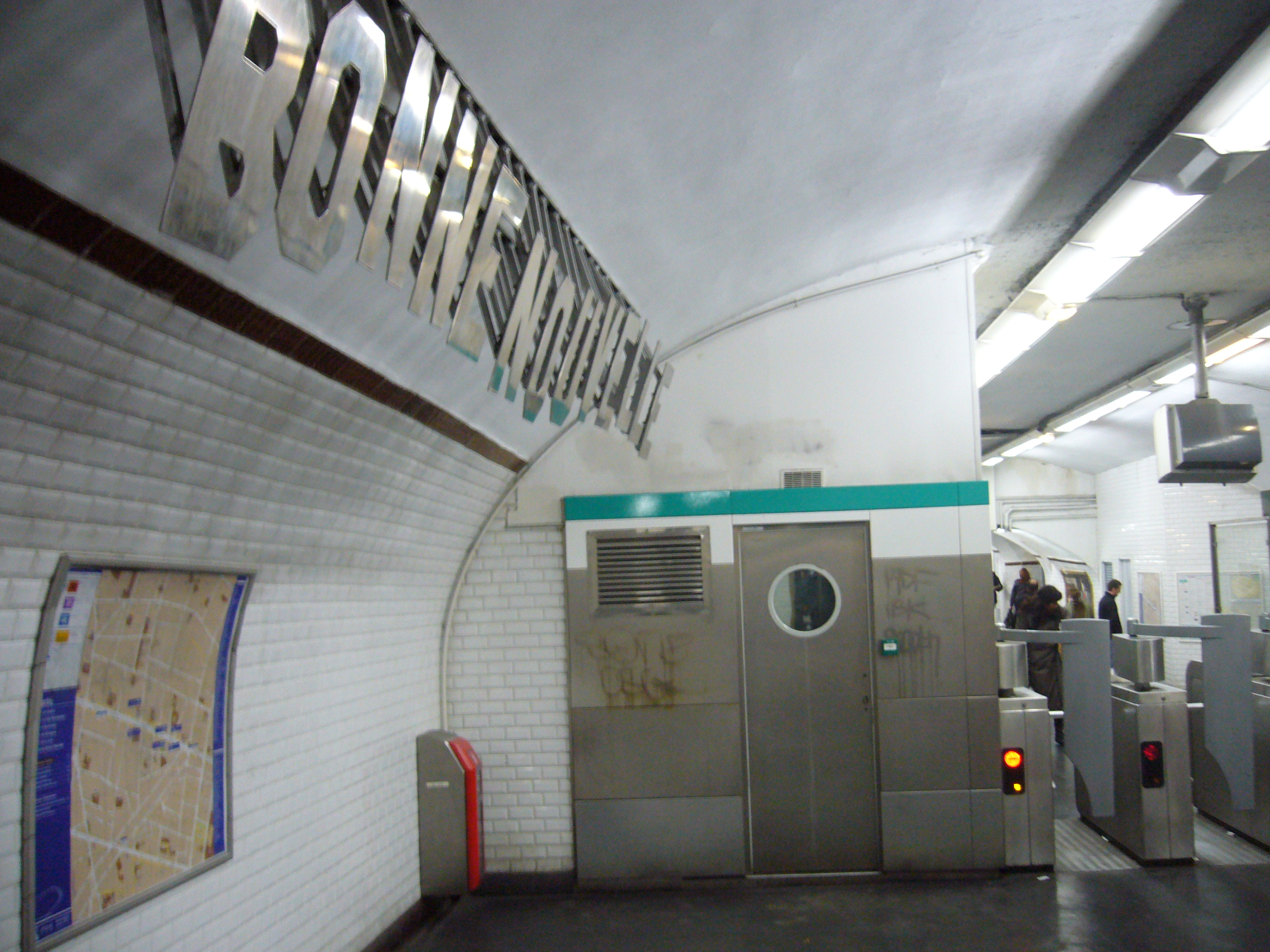
Line 8 ticket hall at Bonne Nouvelle

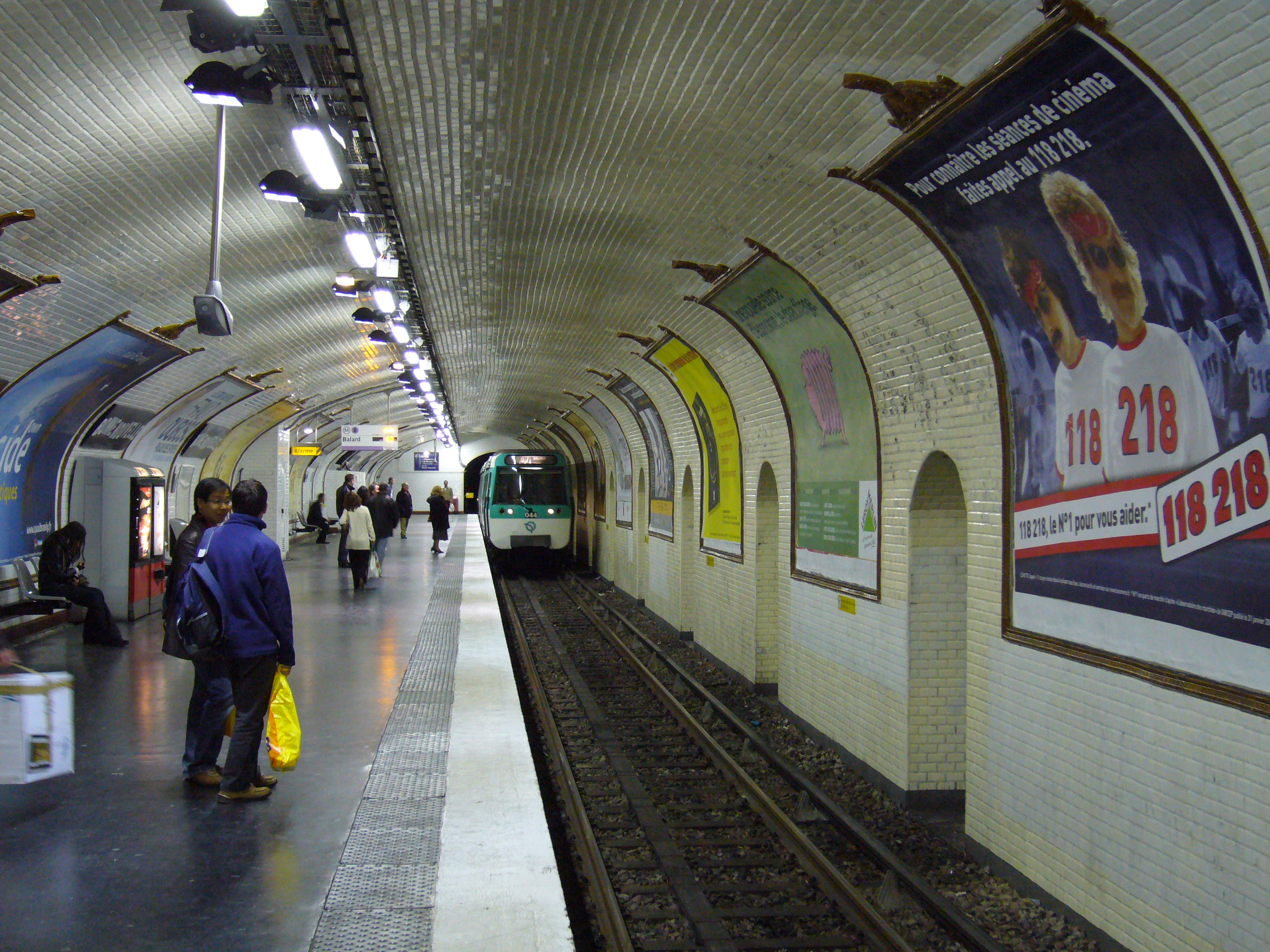
MF 77 rolling stock on Line 8 at Bonne Nouvelle

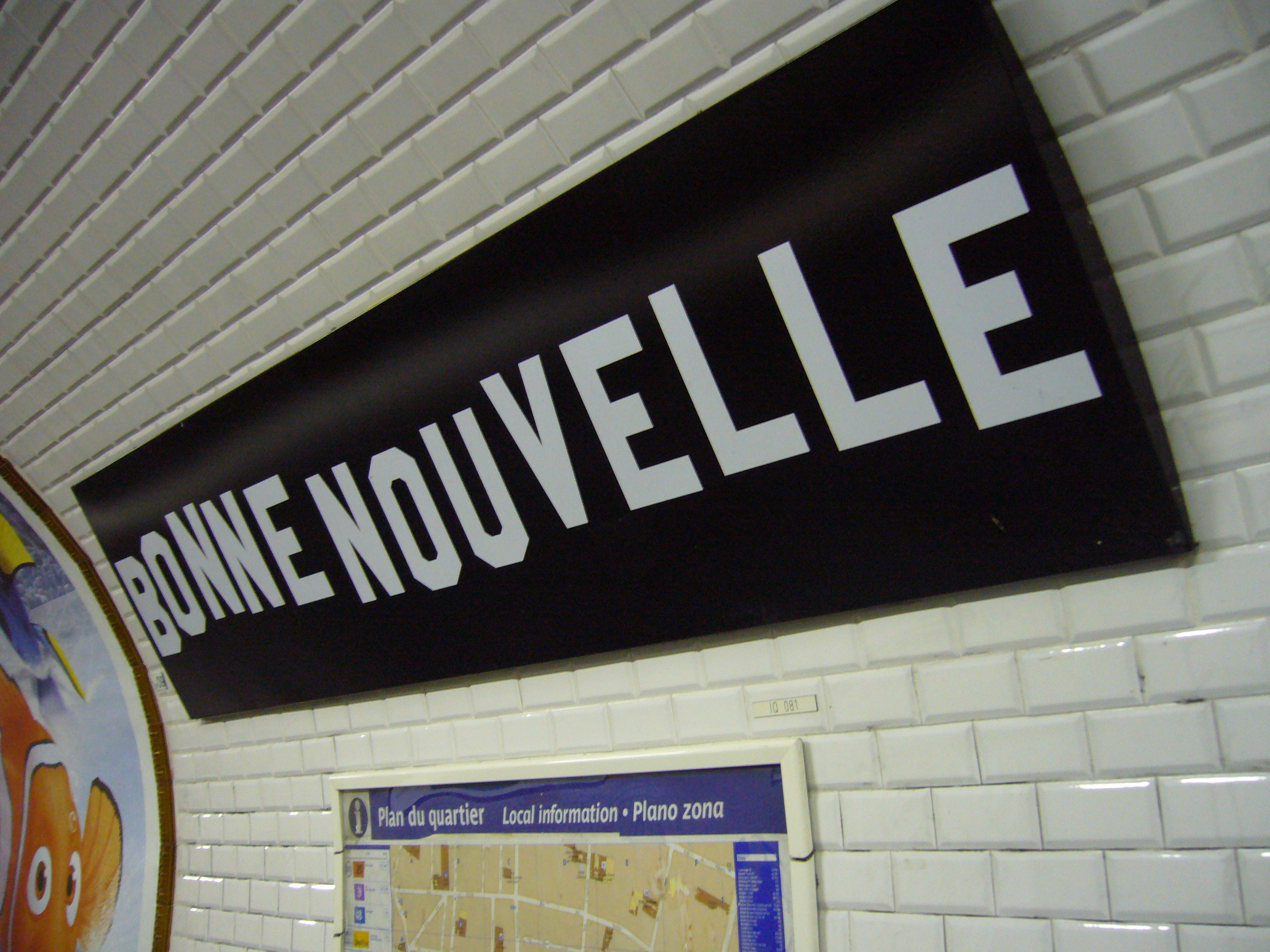
Hollywood-style signage for the Bonne Nouvelle station

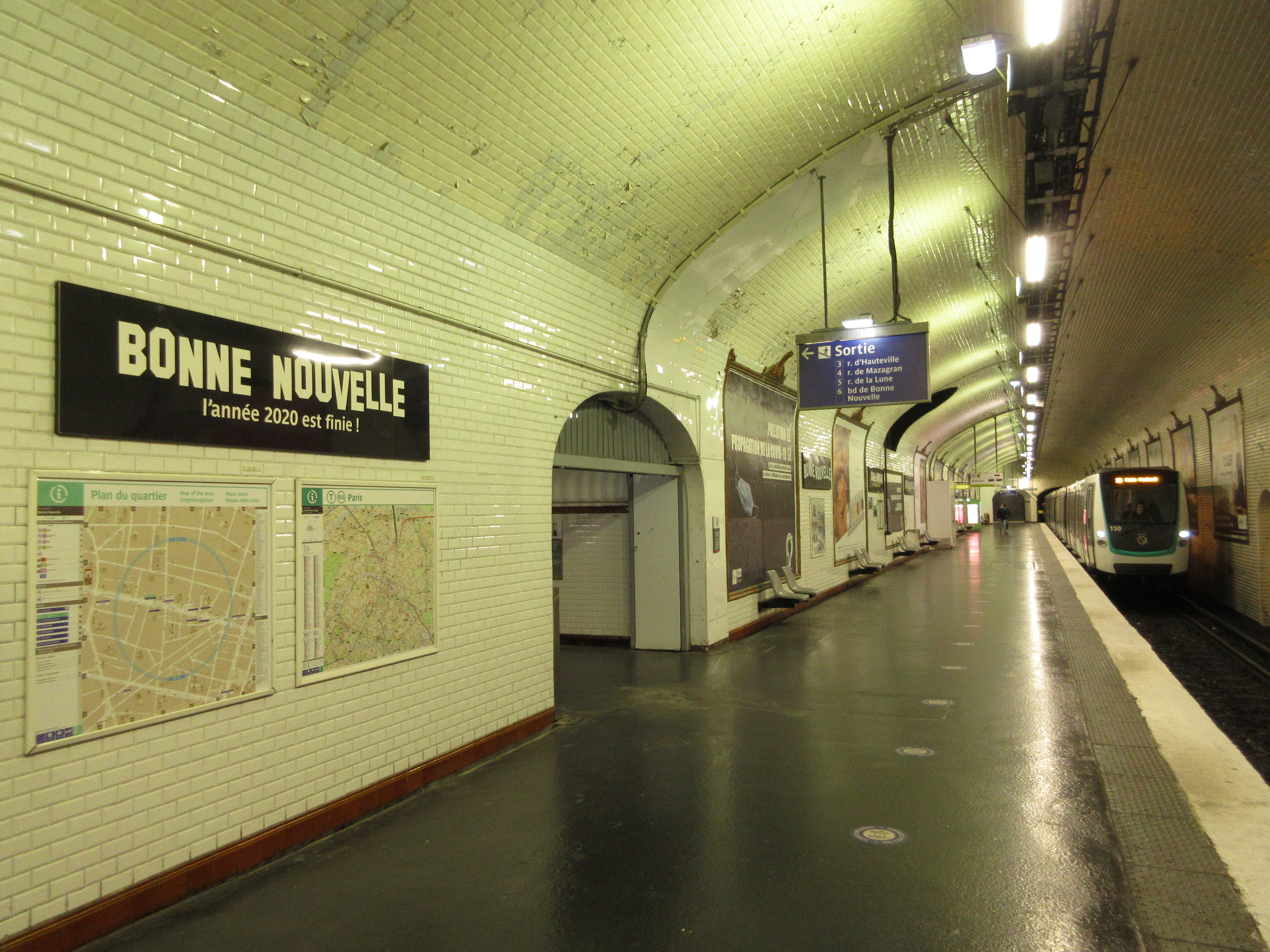
Line 9 platform station on 31 December 2020
