= Notre-Dame-de-Bonne-Nouvelle =

Church in Paris, France

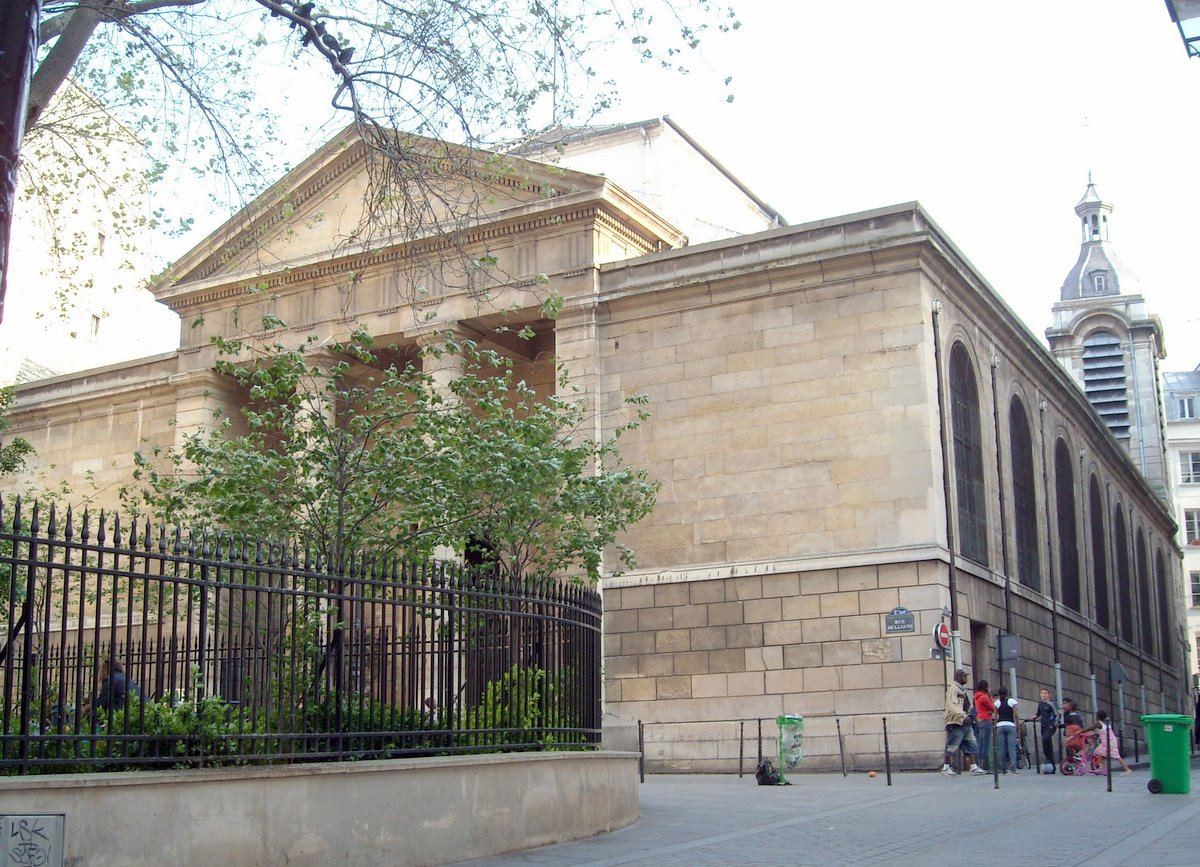
- Notre-Dame de Bonne-Nouvelle

Religion
- Affiliation: Roman Catholic Church
- Province: Archdiocese of Paris
- Region: Île-de-France
- Rite: Roman
- Status: Active

Location
- Location: 25 Rue de la Lune, 2nd arrondissement
- Interactive map of Notre-Dame-de-Bonne-Nouvelle
- Coordinates: 48°52′10.5″N 2°20′59.5″E

Architecture
- Style: Neoclassical
- Groundbreaking: 1823
- Completed: 1830
- Monument historique
- Official name: Notre-Dame de Bonne-Nouvelle
- Designated: 1983
- Reference no.: PA00086016
- Denomination: Église

Notre-Dame-de-Bonne-Nouvelle (French pronunciation: [nɔtʁə dam də bɔn nuvɛl]), located at 25 Rue de la Lune, in the 2nd arrondissement of Paris and is a Catholic parish church built between 1823 and 1830. It is built in the Neoclassical style, and is dedicated to Notre-Dame de Bonne-Nouvelle ("our lady of good news"), referring to the Annunciation. The neighbourhood of Bonne-Nouvelle, the Boulevard de Bonne-Nouvelle (one of the Grand Boulevards that replaced the Louis XIII wall in 1709) and the Bonne Nouvelle metro station are named after it. The church was registered as a national historical monument in 1983.

== History ==
The first chapel was built on the site in 1551, originally dedicated to Saint Louis and Saint Barbara, then rededicated to the Bonne Nouvelle, or the Annunciation of the coming of Christ. This first church was destroyed 1591 by the Catholic League during the siege of Paris by the future Henry IV. Queen Anne of Austria laid the first stone of a new church in 1628. During the French Revolution, the building was badly damaged and in 1823 finally had to be pulled down.

The new church was built between 1823 and 1830 by the architect Étienne-Hippolyte Godde in the neoclassical style, which was very popular following the Restoration of the French Monarchy.

== Exterior ==
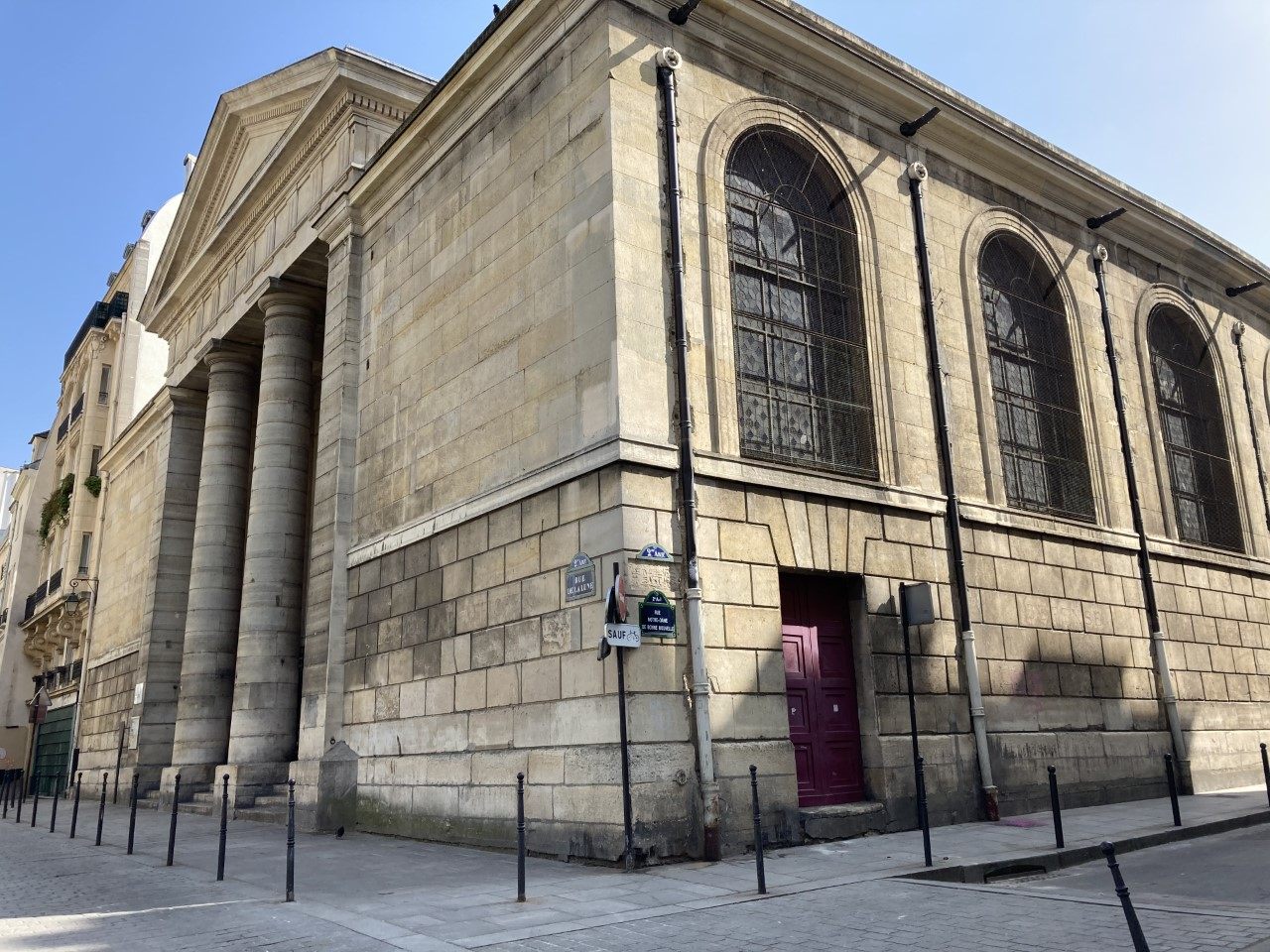
West side of the church

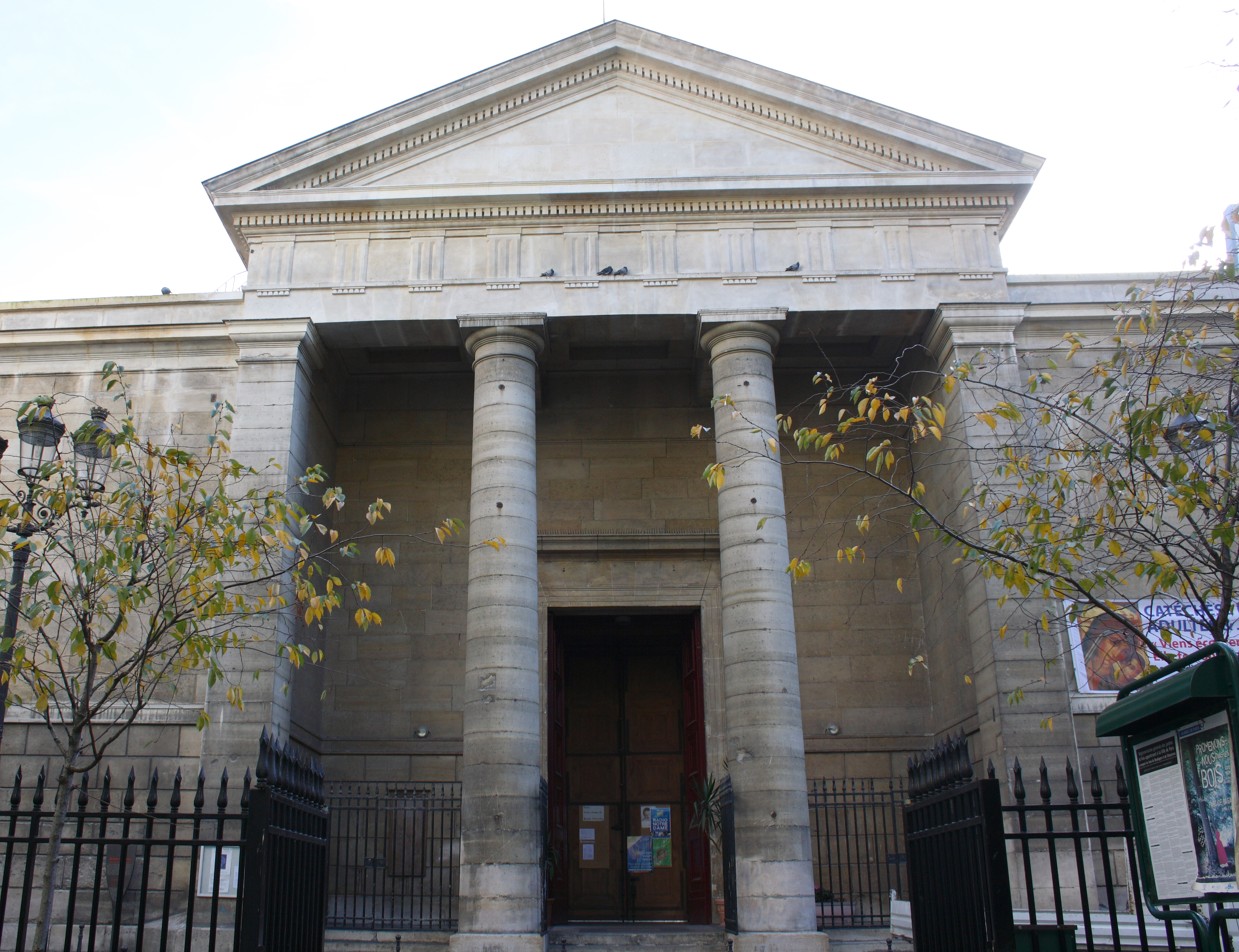
Facade of the church

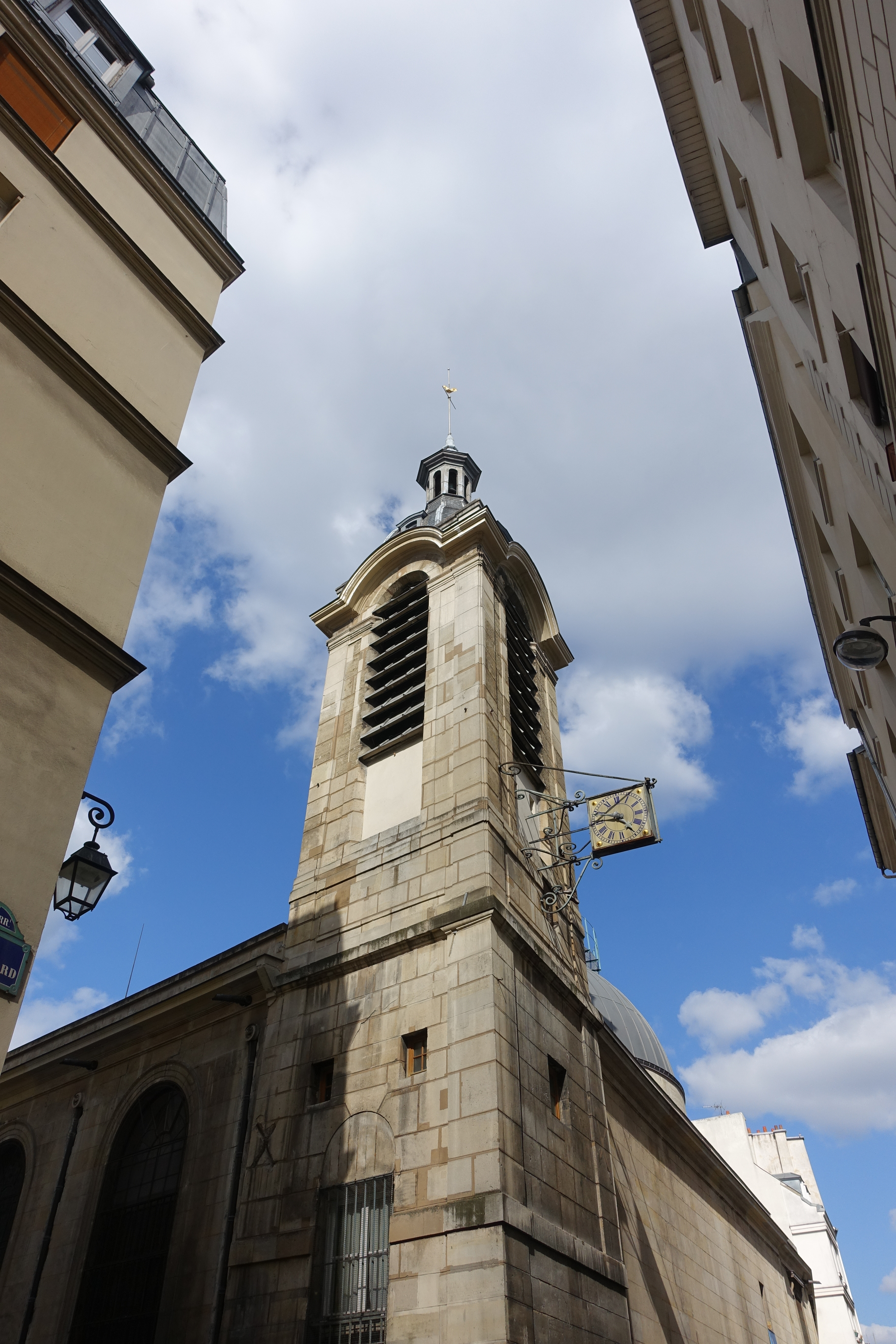
Bell tower (17th c.)_

The facade of the church, facing north, is modelled after an ancient Roman basilica, with two Doric order columns forming a peristyle over the porch. The bell tower is the only surviving vestige of the earlier 17th-century exterior.

== Interior ==
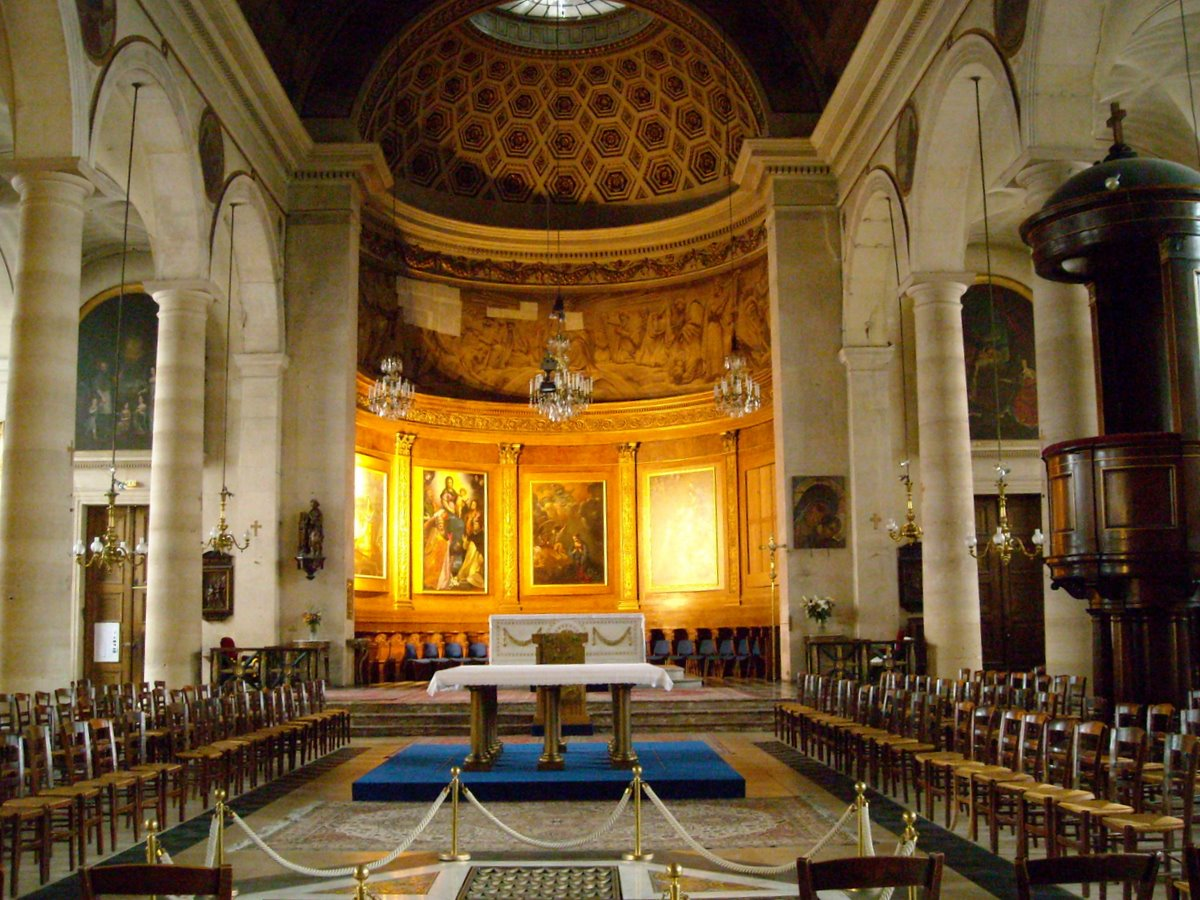
Nave and choir

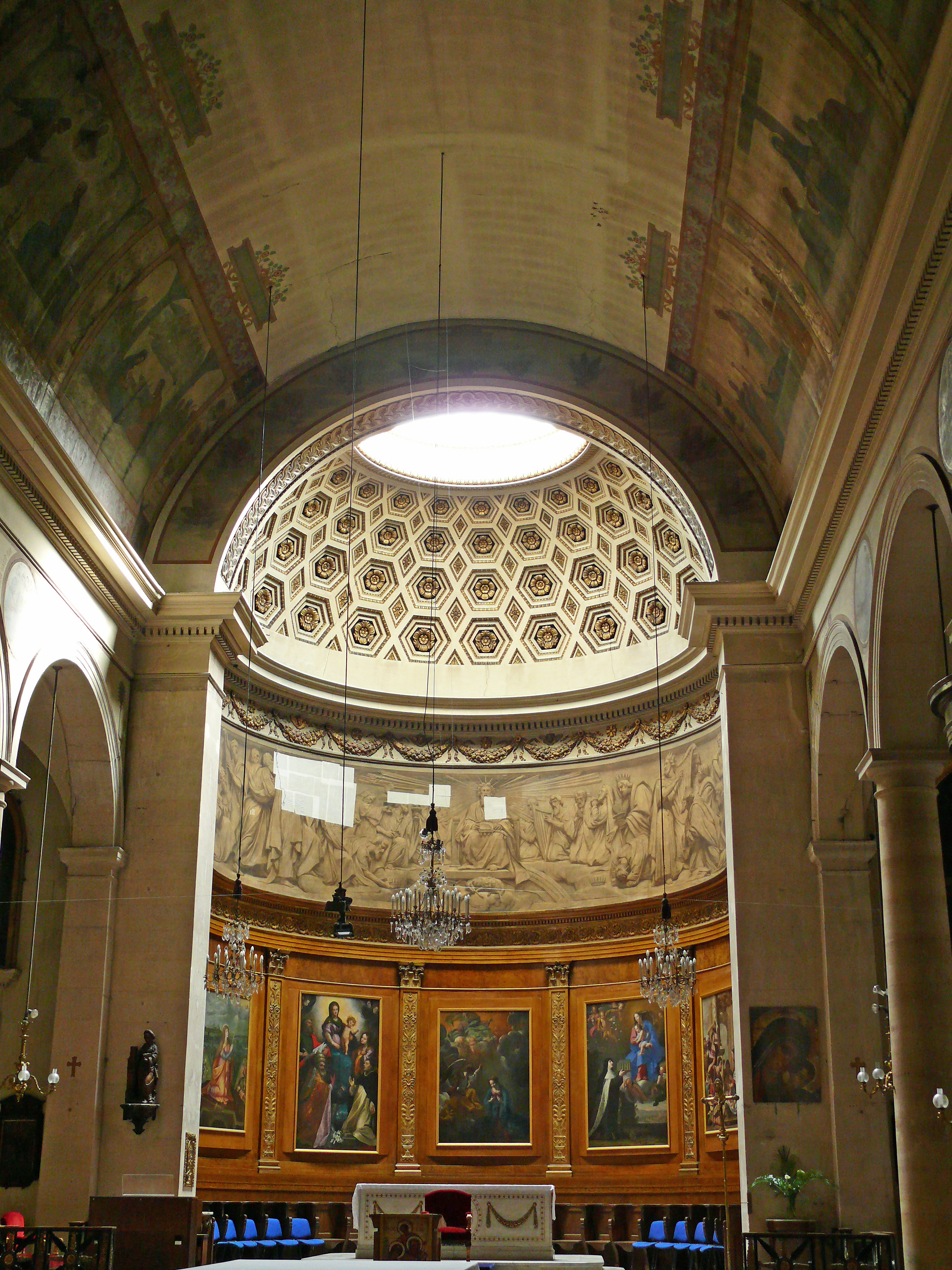
The dome and the choir

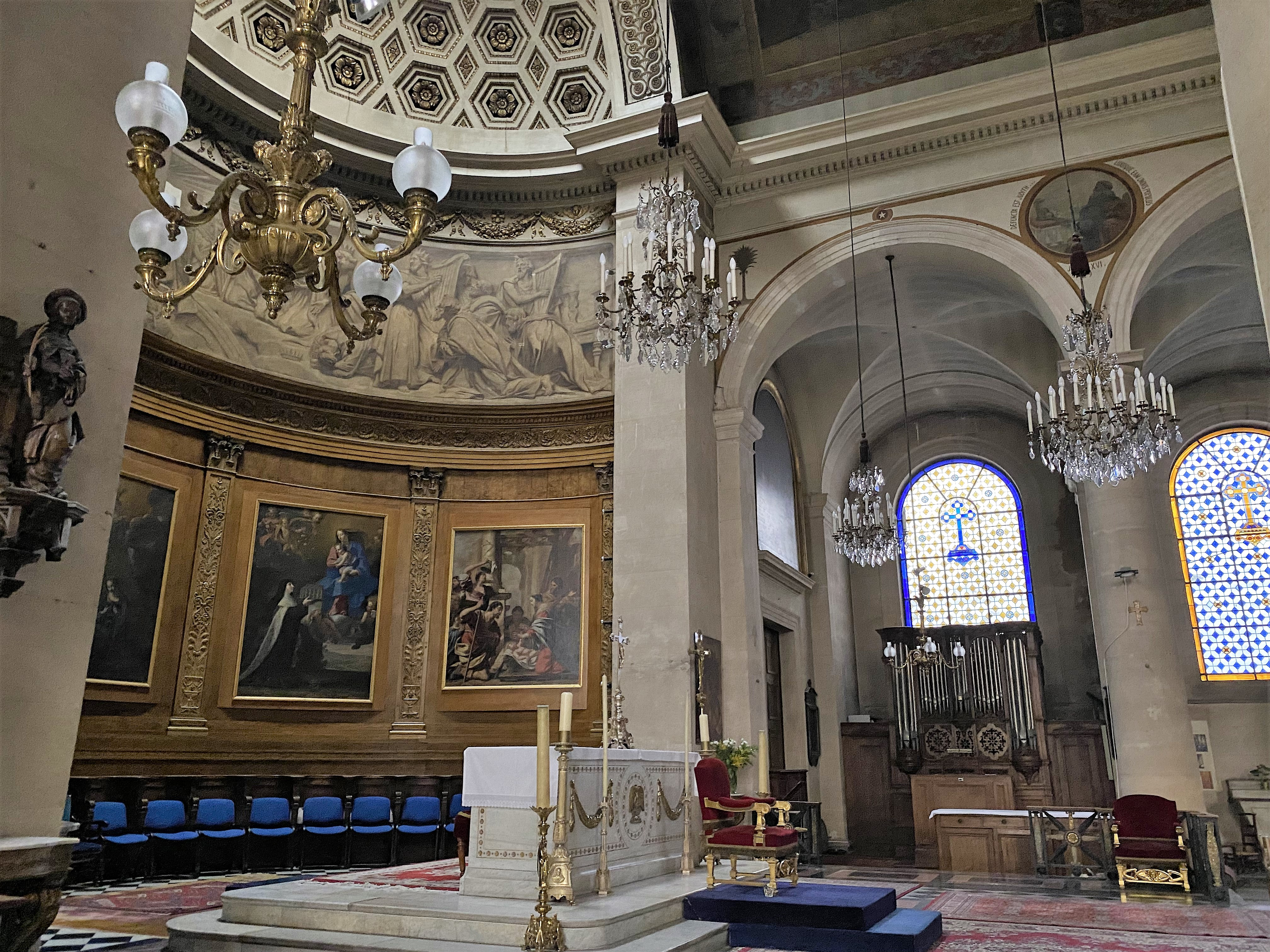
The choir and the organ

Since the church is surrounded by other taller buildings, the interior of the church is dimly lit. The altar, beneath the dome, is lit by a skylight and three chandeliers. The nave and choir are lined with rows of Doric columns creating arcades with rounded arches.

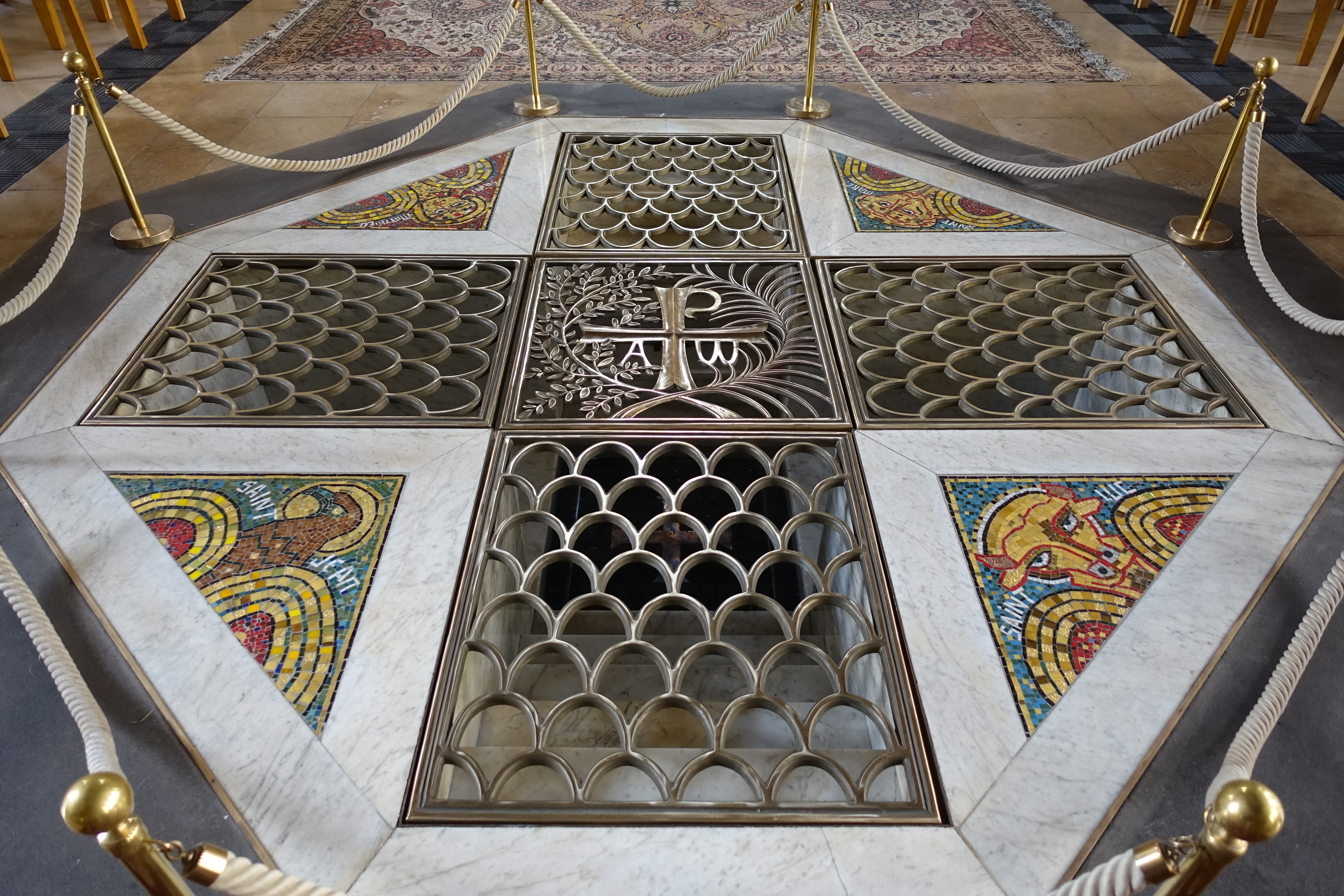
The Baptismal Font

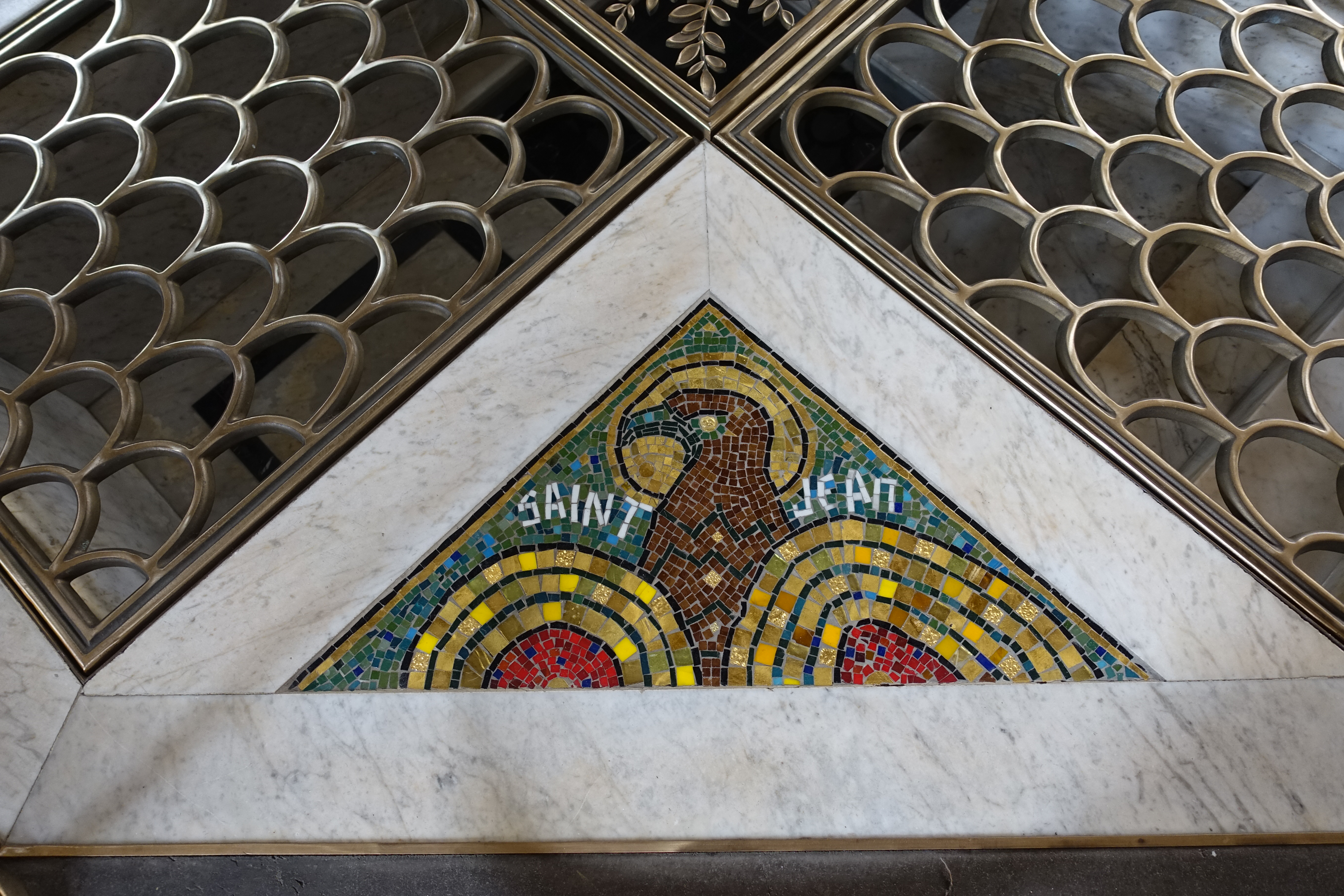
Decoration of the Baptismal Font - Saint James.

The most distinctive feature of the interior is the large octagonal Baptismal Font in center. It is designed for full-immersion baptisms, with the person baptized completely immersed in the water, rather than priest simply touching water on their face. It is one of the seven sacraments which mark entry into a Christian life, a ceremony dating back to ancient Christian church. The octagonal font is surrounded with mosaics which depict the symbols of the four Evangelists; a lion (Saint Mark), a bull (Saint Luke), an eagle (Saint John) and a man with wings (Saint Matthew). The seven step represent the seven capital sins. The steps stop at bronze and nickel cross set into the floor.

== Art and decoration ==
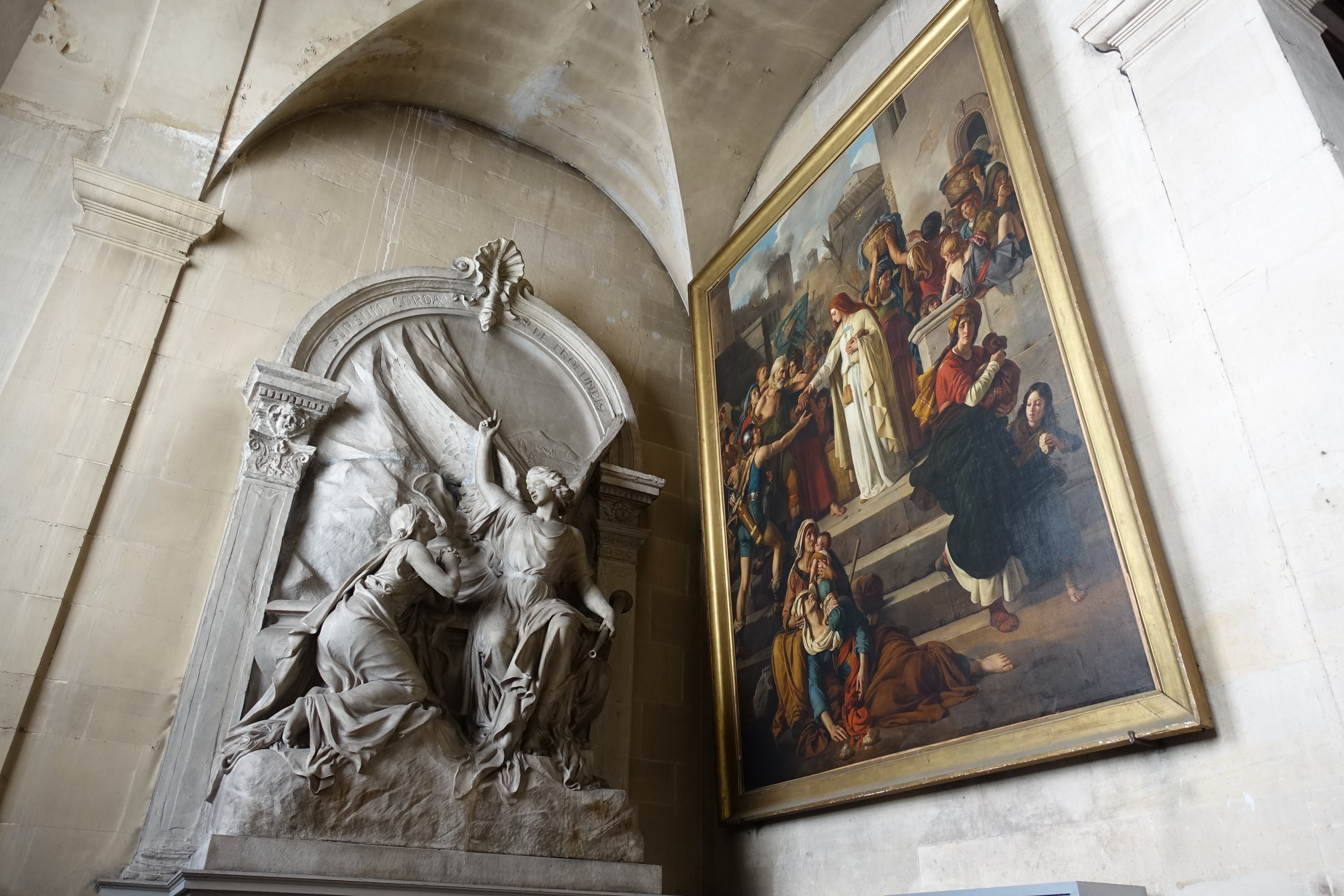
"The Virgin surrounded by the Saints" (right), by Ludovico Cardi

The choir of the church displays paintings by three notable Baroque artists from the 16th and 17th centuries.

- "The Annunciation" by Giovanni Lanfranco (1582-1647) of Parma, ar vivid Baroque display of skill with darkness and light, and tones of red and orange, around the figures of the Virgin Mary and the Angel Gabriel.
- "The satisfaction of Isabel of France" by Philippe de Champagne (1602-1674). This painting depicts the dedication of the monastery of Longchamps to the Virgin Mary by its founder, Isabel, the sister of Louis IX, or Saint Louis, featuring the figures of Isabel and the against a background of the Paris cityscape.
- "The Virgin Surrounded by the Saints" by Ludovico Cardi of Florence (1559-1613). This shows The Virgin meeting Saint John the Evangelist, Mary Magdalen, Saint Dominic, and Pope Pius V.
- A notable 19th century work with a Parisian theme is found in the lower left aisle: "Saint Genevieve distributing bread to the Parisians", by Jean-Victor Schnetz (1787-1870)

=== Organ ===
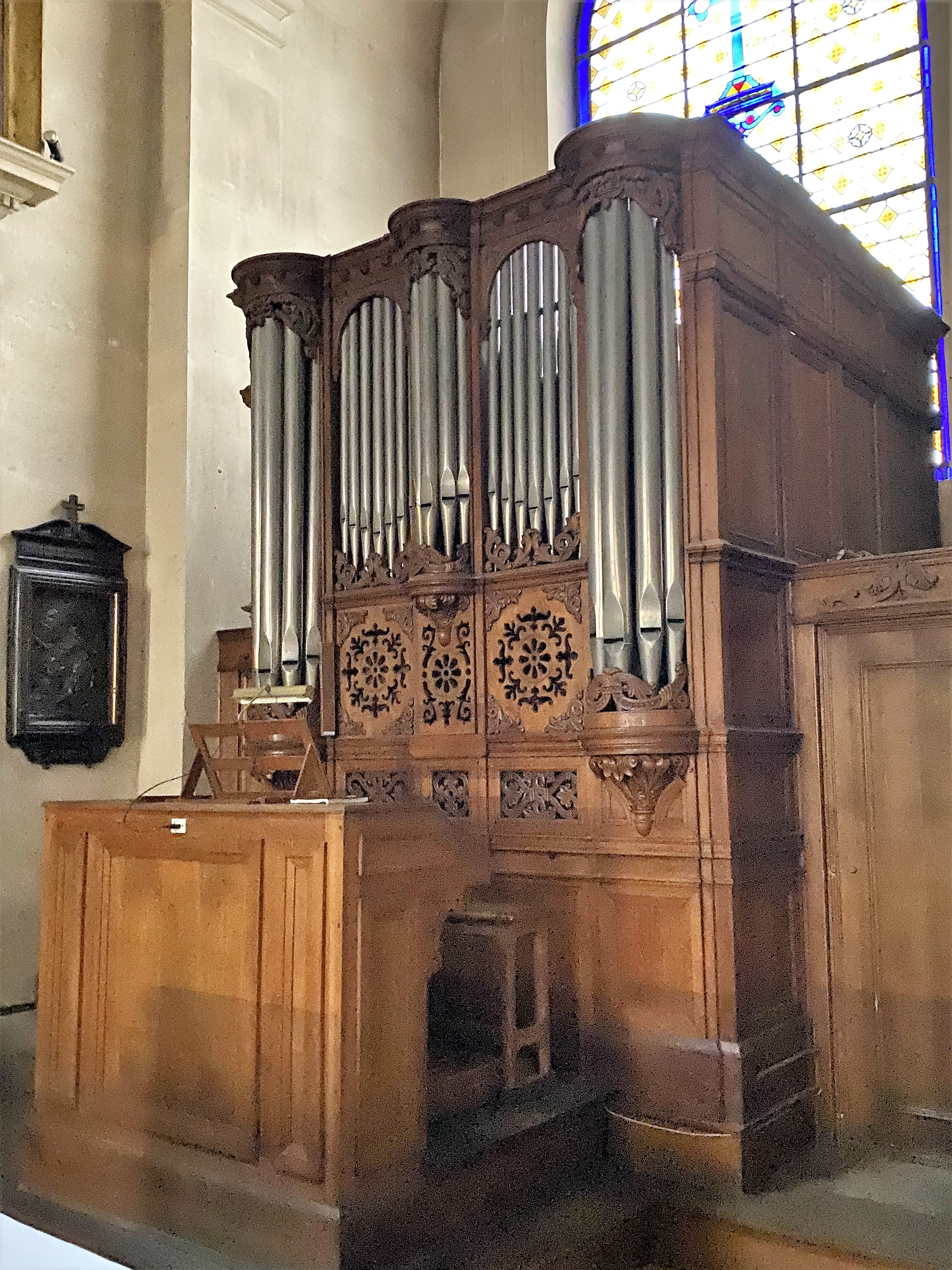

The church organ was built by John Abbey at the end of the 19th century, then was restored in 1950 by Joseph Gutschenritter, and again in 1988 by Jean-Marc Cicchero.

== Bibliography ==
- Dumoulin, Aline; Alexandra Ardisson; Jérôme Maingard; Murielle Antonello (2017). Paris d'église en église (in French). Paris: Éditions Massin, collection Reconnaître. ISBN 978-2-7072-0583-4.

== See also ==
- List of historic churches in Paris
