= Étienne-Hippolyte Godde =

French neoclassic architect (1781-1869)

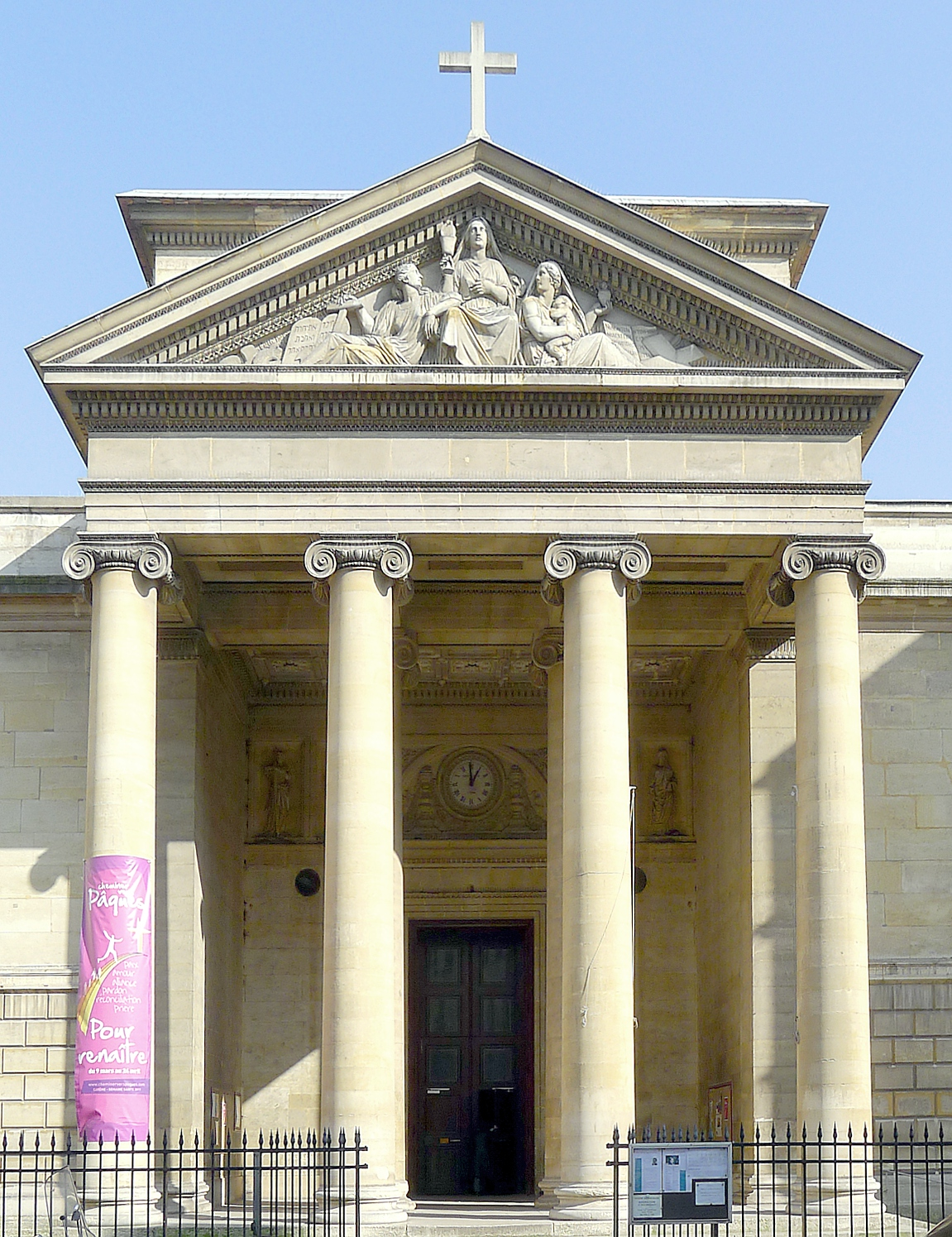
Church of St. Denys du Saint-Sacrement, Paris

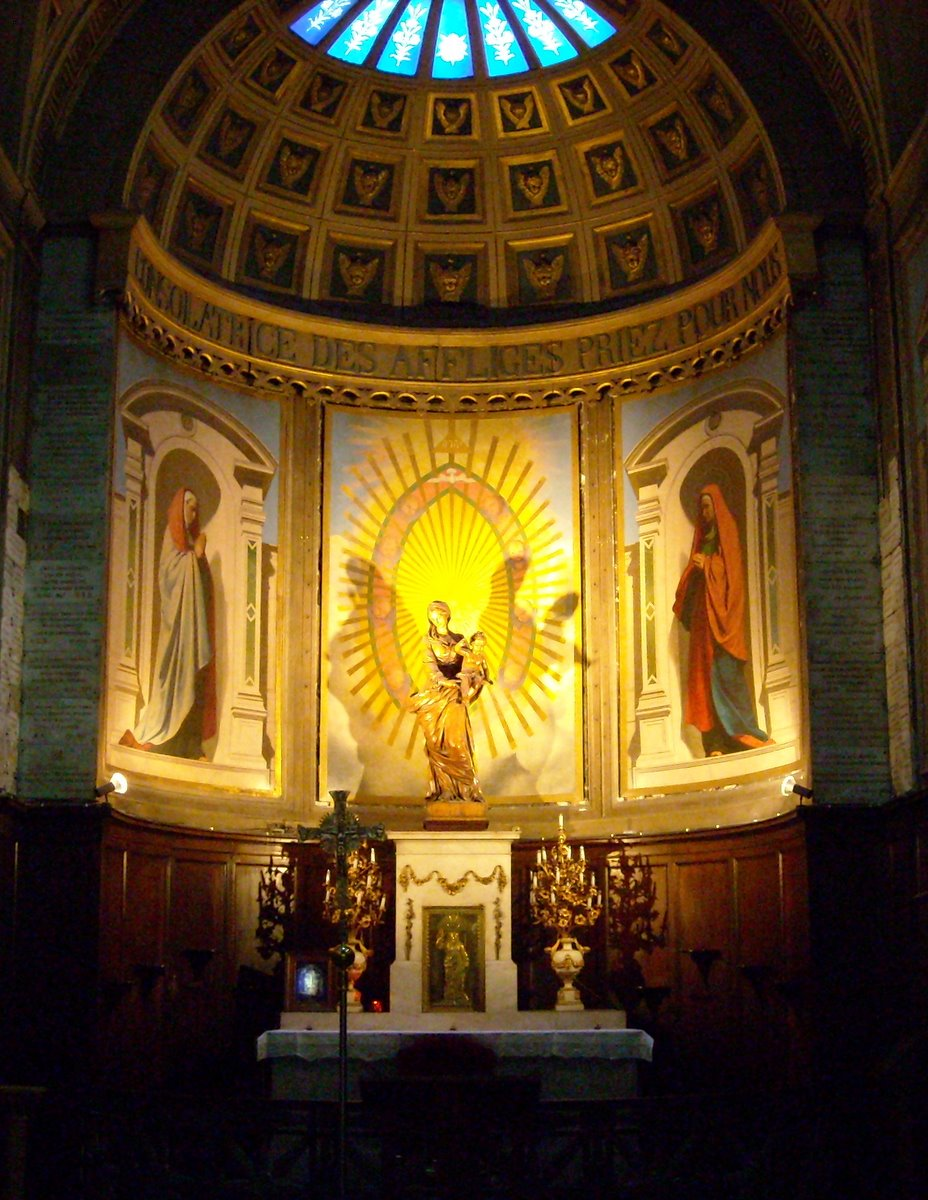
interior, Notre-Dame de Bonne-Nouvelle, Paris

Étienne-Hippolyte Godde (French pronunciation: [etjɛn ippɔlit ɡɔd]; 26 December 1781 – 1869) was a French neoclassic architect.

Born in Breteuil, Oise, educated at the École nationale supérieure des Beaux-Arts, and Architect of the City of Paris from 1813 to 1830, Godde designed some thirty religious buildings, six public buildings, and numerous other structures. Among his apprentices was Henri Labrouste. In poverty later in life, he was buried in the 27th division of Père Lachaise Cemetery.

== Work ==
- Church of Boves in Picardie, 1805-1818
- restructuring of the Abbey of Saint-Germain-des-Prés between 1819 and 1827
- Notre-Dame de Bonne-Nouvelle, Paris, 2nd arrondissement, 1823-1829
- the chapel and the gate of Père Lachaise Cemetery in Paris, 1823-1825
- Church of St. Pierre du Gros Caillou, in Paris, 7th arrondissement, 1829
- Church of St. Denys du Saint-Sacrement in Paris, 3rd arrondissement, with pediment sculpture by Jean-Jacques Feuchère, 1835
- restoration of the Church of Saint-Germain l'Auxerrois, Paris, 1st arrondissement, 1838-1848
- Enlargement of Saint Elizabeth of Hungary Church, Paris
- expansion and renovation of Église Saint-Philippe-du-Roule, Paris, 8th arrondissement, 1846
- Cathédrale Sainte-Croix-Saint-Jean-des-Arméniens, 1855
- Old Seminary of St. Sulpice in Paris
- Part of the old Hotel de Ville in Paris (destroyed during the Commune) in collaboration with Jean-Baptiste Lesueur
- reconstruction work at Amiens Cathedral
