= Musée Grévin – Forum des Halles =

Museum in France

Coordinates: 48.8619°N 2.3469°E

The Musée Grévin – Forum des Halles was a wax museum located in the Forum des Halles, level 1, in the 1st arrondissement of Paris at 1 Rue Pierre Lescot, Paris, France. It opened in 1981 and closed in 1996.

The museum was an annex of its main Musée Grévin, and devoted to life in the Belle Époque (1885-1900). It featured 21 animated scenes with sound effects.

== See also ==
- List of museums in Paris
