= Grands Boulevards station =

Metro station in Paris, France

Grands Boulevards
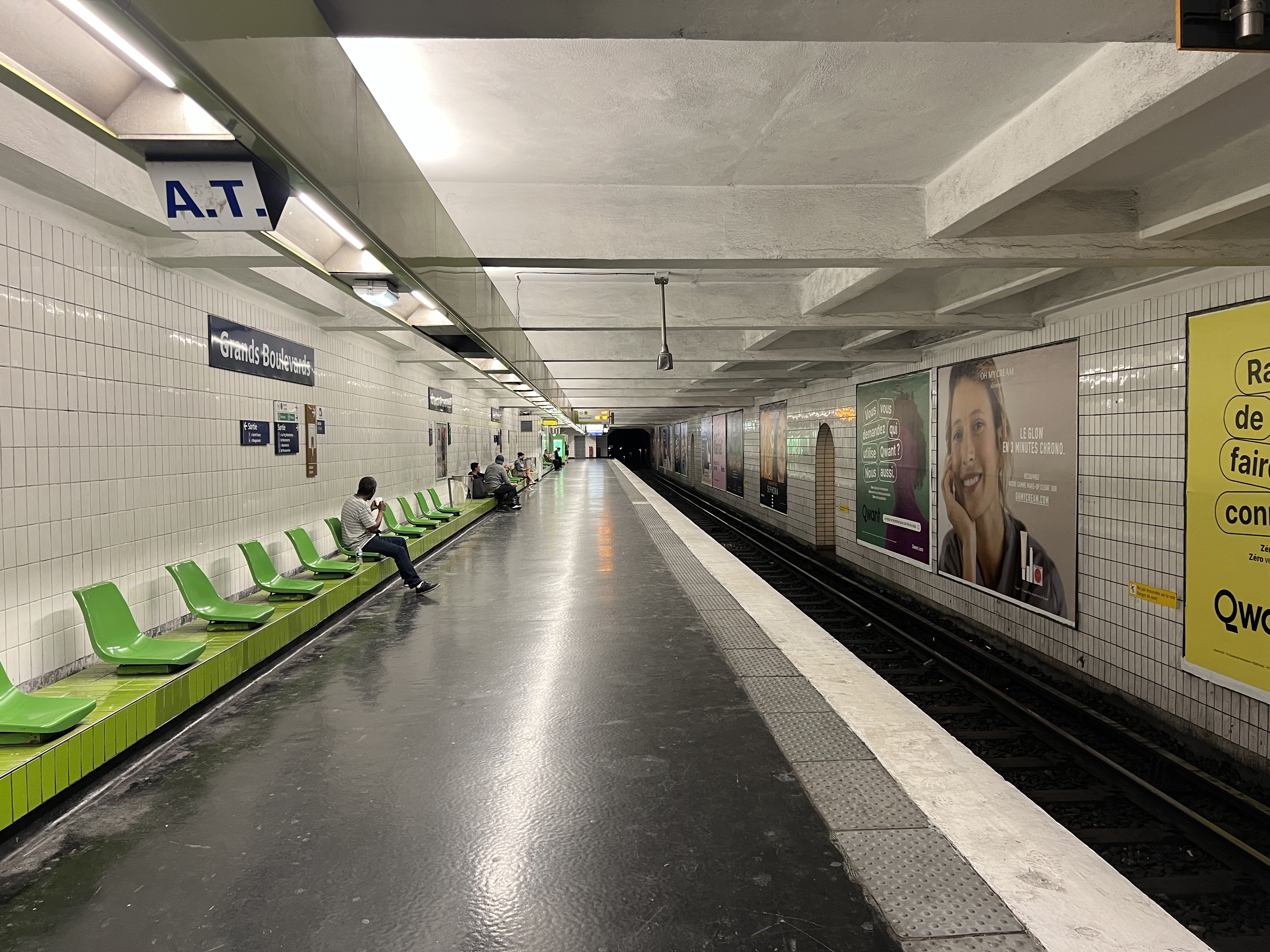
- Line 9 platform

General information
- Location: 2nd and 9th arrondissement of Paris; Île-de-France; France
- Coordinates: 48°52′17″N 2°20′40″E
- System: Paris Métro station
- Owner: RATP
- Operator: RATP

Other information
- Fare zone: 1

History
- Opened: 5 May 1931
- Former names: Rue Montmartre (1931–1998)

Services
Preceding station	Paris Metro	Following station
Richelieu–Drouot towards Balard	Line 8	Bonne Nouvelle towards Pointe du Lac
Richelieu–Drouot towards Pont de Sèvres	Line 9	Bonne Nouvelle towards Mairie de Montreuil
Location
- Location within Paris

Grands Boulevards (French pronunciation: [ɡʁɑ̃ bulvaʁ]), formerly named Rue Montmartre (1931–1998), is a station on Lines 8 and 9 of the Paris Métro. In 2019, it was the 44th busiest station of the Métro network, with 6,807,424 yearly users.

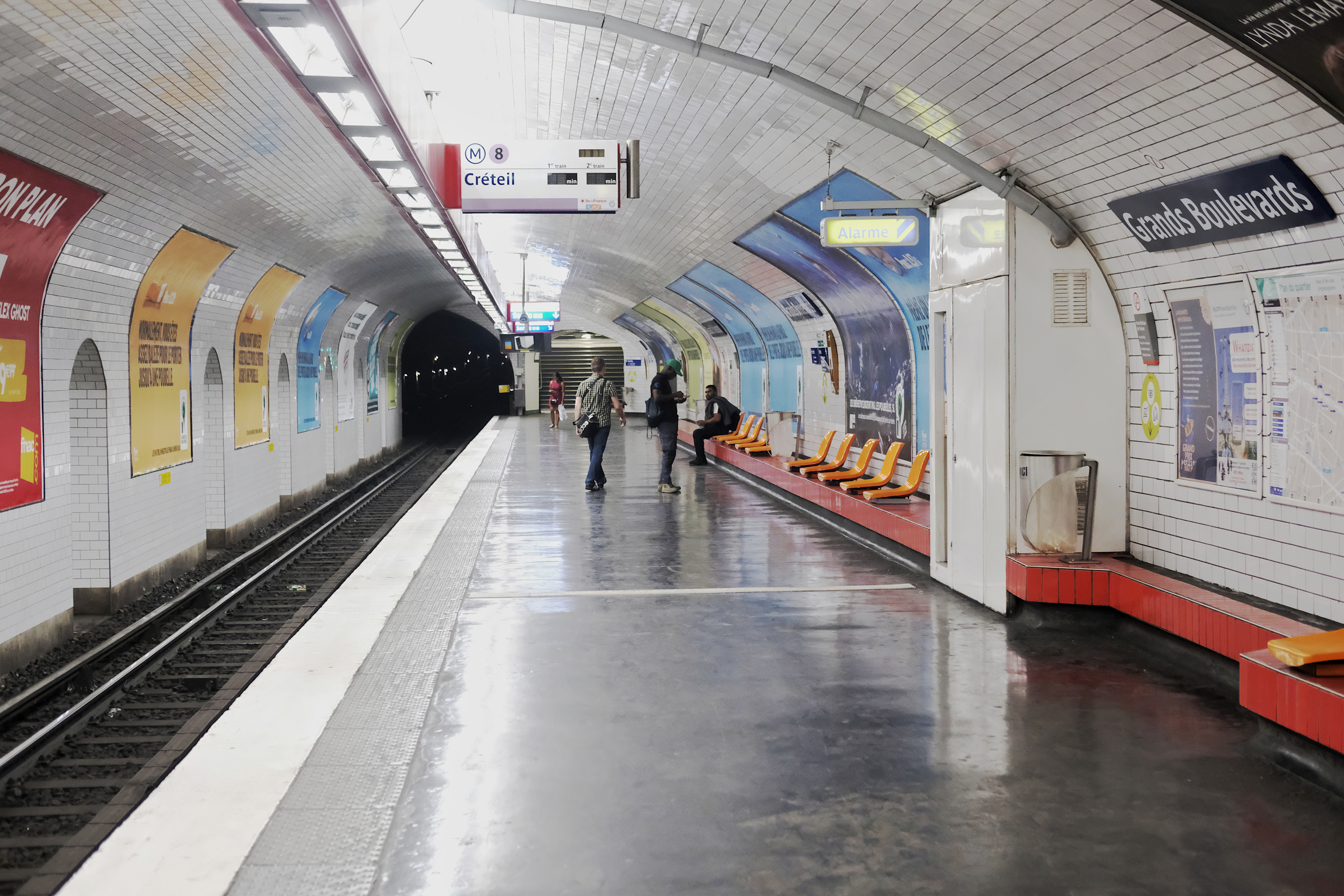
Line 8 platform.

The section of both lines from just east of Richelieu–Drouot to west of République was built under the Grand Boulevards, partly on the border between the 2nd and 9th arrondissements, that replaced the Louis XIII wall and is in soft ground, which was once the course of the Seine. The lines are built on two levels, with Line 8 on the higher level and Line 9 in the lower level. The platforms are at the sides and the box containing the lines and supporting the road above is strengthened by a central wall between the tracks.

== History ==
=== Opening ===
The station was opened on 5 May 1931 with the extension of Line 8 from Richelieu–Drouot to Porte de Charenton. The Line 9 platforms were opened on 10 December 1933 with the extension of the line from Richelieu–Drouot to Porte de Montreuil.

=== Name change ===
The station was originally called "Rue Montmartre," but the tiled nameplates read simply "Montmartre." This caused confusion for non-Parisians and tourists, as the Montmartre neighbhorhood lies significantly north of the station. In 1966, an attempt was made to improve clarity by covering the original nameplates with signs reading "Rue Montmartre," but confusion continued. The station was renamed to "Grands Boulevards" in 1998 to reflect the programme of the former Mayor of Paris, Jean Tiberi, to upgrade the main Boulevards of Paris and because the old name continued to be misleading.

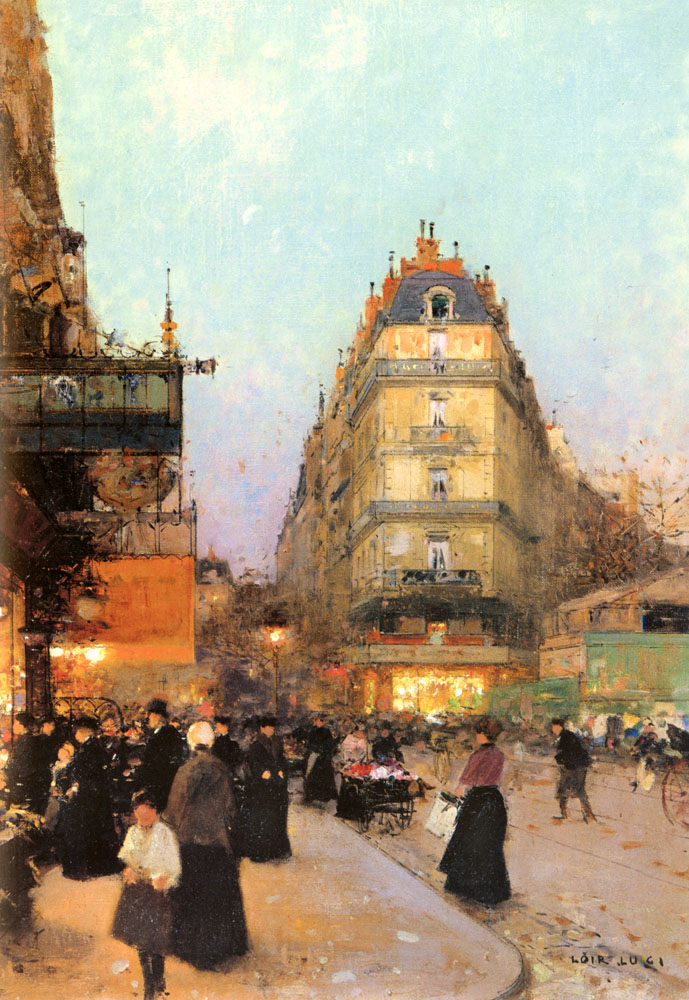
Les Grands Boulevards by Luigi Loir (1845–1916)

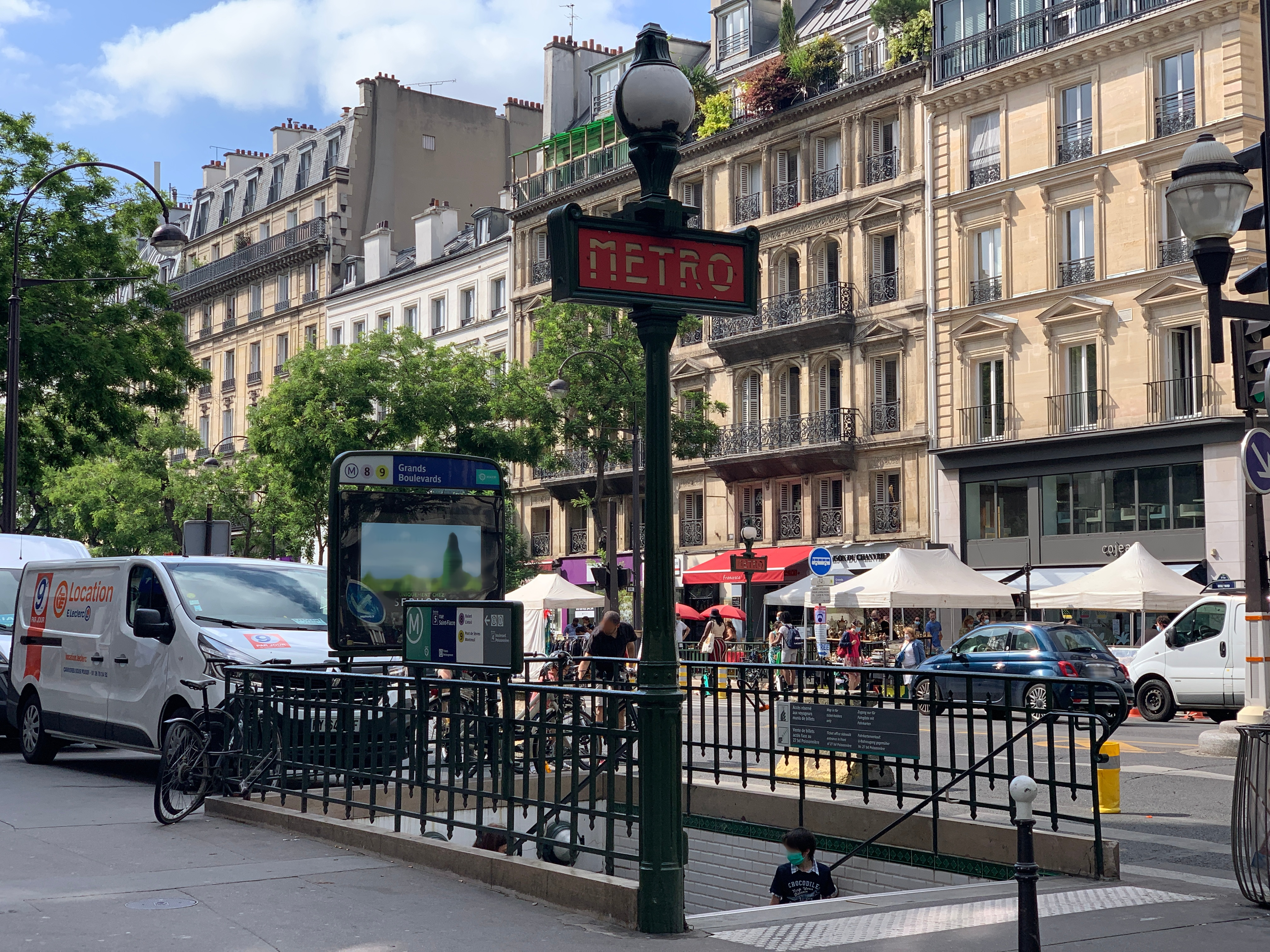
Station entrance on Boulevard Poissonière, just west of Boulevard Montmartre

== Passenger services ==
=== Access ===
The station has six entrances:

- Entrance 1 - Rue du Faubourg-Montmartre
- Entrance 2 - Boulevard Montmartre, Musée Grévin
- Entrance 3 - Rue Montmartre
- Entrance 4 - Boulevard Poissonnière
- Entrance 5 - Rue Saint-Fiacre
- Entrance 6 - Rue Rougemont

=== Station layout ===
G	Street Level	Exit/Entrance
B1	Side platform, doors will open on the right
B1	Westbound line 8	← toward Balard (Richelieu–Drouot)
B1	Wall
B1	Eastbound line 8	toward Créteil–Pointe du Lac (Bonne Nouvelle) →
B1	Side platform, doors will open on the right
B2	Side platform, doors will open on the right
B2	Westbound line 9	← toward Pont de Sèvres (Richelieu–Drouot)
B2	Wall
B2	Eastbound line 9	toward Mairie de Montreuil (Bonne Nouvelle) →
B2	Side platform, doors will open on the right

=== Platforms ===
The platforms of the two lines, 105 meters long, have a particular configuration. Two in number per stopping point, they are isolated in two half-stations separated by a central wall due to their construction in unstable land. Those of line 8 have an elliptical vault while those of line 9, arranged below, have vertical side walls and a horizontal reinforced concrete ceiling.

Their decoration is in the Andreu-Motte style in both cases. Those of line 8 have two red light strips (one per half-station), a bench in flat red tiles and orange Motte seats. Those of line 9 have two green light canopies (one per half-station, offset on the side opposite the track), benches in flat green tiles and green Motte seats. These fittings are combined with the flat white ceramic tiles, which are placed horizontally and in staggered rows on the side walls and the vaults of line 8, while they are placed vertically and aligned on the side walls of line 9, the ceiling of the latter being simply painted white. The advertising frames are metallic, and the name of the station is written in Parisine typeface on enamelled plates.

=== Bus connections ===
The station is served by lines 20, 32, 39, 74 and 85 of the RATP Bus Network.

== Nearby ==
- Musée Grévin
- Théâtre des Nouveautés
- Théâtre des Variétés
- Passage Jouffroy
- Passage des Panoramas
- Galerie Saint-Marc
- Galerie Montmartre

== Sources ==
- Roland, Gérard (2003). Stations de métro. D’Abbesses à Wagram. Éditions Bonneton.
