= Passage Jouffroy =

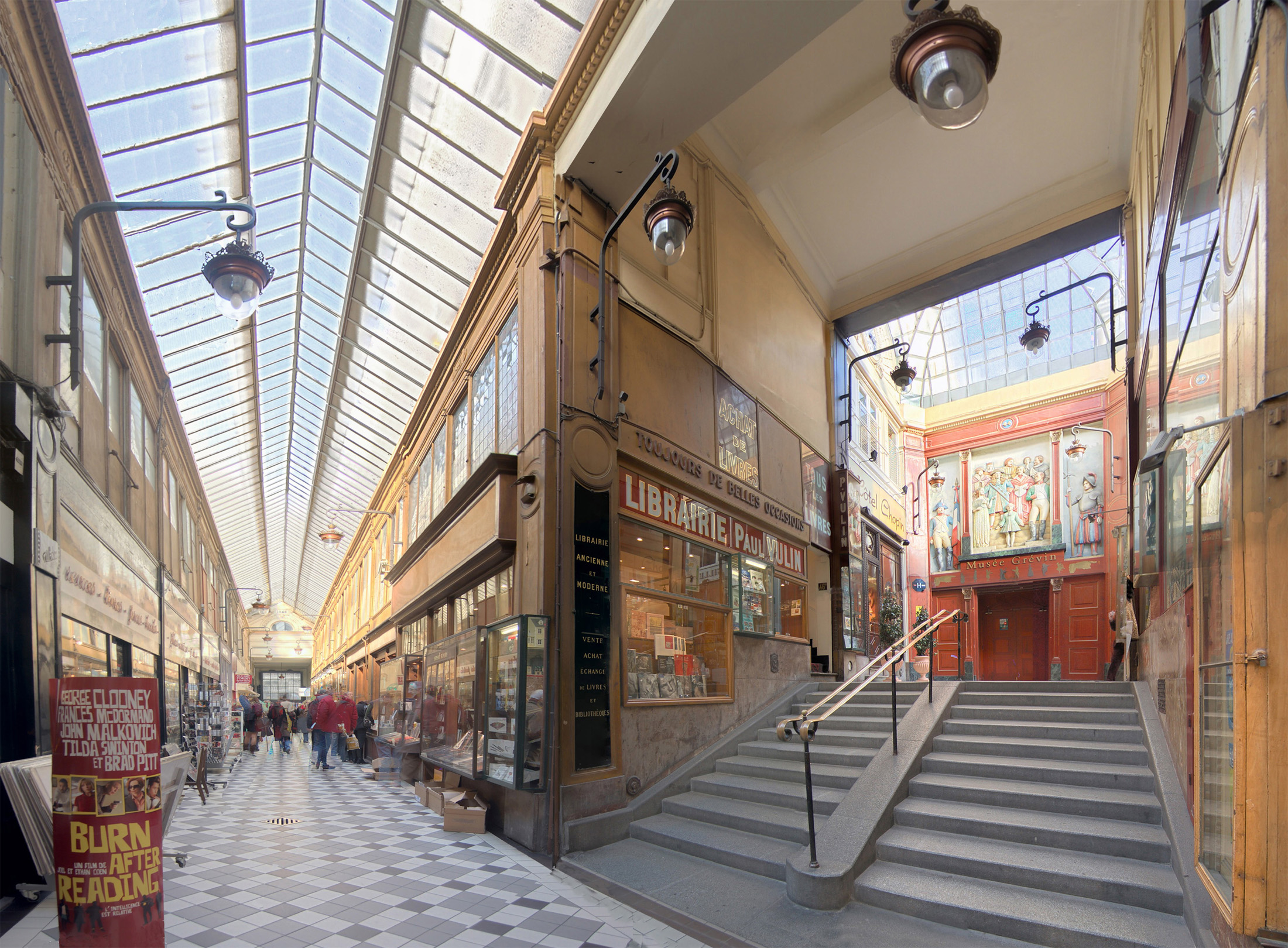

- Location within Paris

General information
- Type: Covered passage
- Location: 10 Boulevard Montmartre - 9 rue de la Grange-Batelière, Paris, France
- Coordinates: 48.872549°N 2.342141°E

Technical details
- Floor area: 140 by 4 metres (459 by 13 ft)

The Passage Jouffroy (French pronunciation: [pasaʒ ʒufʁwa]) is one of the covered passages of Paris, located in the 9th arrondissement. It runs between the Boulevard Montmartre to the south and the Rue de la Grange-Batelière to the north.

== Description ==
The Passage Jouffroy is a covered walkway in the south of the 9th arrondissement of Paris, on the border with the 2nd arrondissement. It begins in the south between 10 and 12 boulevard Montmartre, and ends in the north at 9 rue de la Grange-Batelière.

Each passage is about 140 metres (460 ft) long and 4 metres (13 ft) wide. About 80 metres (260 ft) from its entrance on the Boulevard Montmartre, the passage makes a right angle turn and runs west for a few metres before descending some stairs. It then continues in a northerly direction to its outlet on the Rue Grange-Batelière. This was imposed by the irregular pattern of the three plots on which the passage was built. This last part of the passage is particularly narrow, leaving room only for the corridor and a shop. The Passage des Panoramas opens as a continuation of the passage Jouffroy on the other side of the Boulevard Montmartre. The Passage Verdeau does the same on the other side, after crossing the street from the Grange Batelière.

The passage is covered by a canopy of metal and glass. An ornate clock stucco overlooks the alley. The floor is paved with a geometric pattern composed of white, gray and black squares. The exit from the Musée Grévin is located inside the Passage Jouffroy.

== History ==
The Passage Jouffroy was built in 1845 along the line of the Passage des Panoramas in order to capitalize on the popularity of the latter. A private company was formed to manage it, headed by Count Félix de Jouffroy-Gonsans (1791–1863), who gave his name to the passage, and Verdeau, who gave his name to the passage that was built as a further extension, the Passage Verdeau. The passage was built by architects François Destailleur and Romain de Bourges.

The Passage Jouffroy represents an important stage in the technological evolution of the 19th century and the mastery of iron structures. It is the first Parisian passage built entirely of metal and glass. Only the decorative elements are wooden. It is also the first passage heated by the ground.

In the early 1880s, Arthur Meyer, founder of the newspaper Le Gaulois, joined the cartoonist Alfred Grévin to create a gallery of wax figures on a property adjacent to the passage. It was inaugurated on 10 January 1882 and has since become the Musée Grévin. The exit of the museum, decorated with a montage of various characters, is in the passage and contributes in large part to its success. The museum includes a hall of mirrors that was originally housed in the Palais des mirages designed by Eugène Hénard for the Exposition Universelle (1900).

In 1974, the passage was registered as a monument historique. The passage was completely renovated in 1987 and regained its original paving.

== Transport ==
The closest Metro stations are Grands Boulevards (lines 8 and 9), 100 metres (330 ft) to the east up the Boulevard Montmartre, and Richelieu-Drouot on the same lines 130 metres (430 ft) to the west.

== Gallery ==
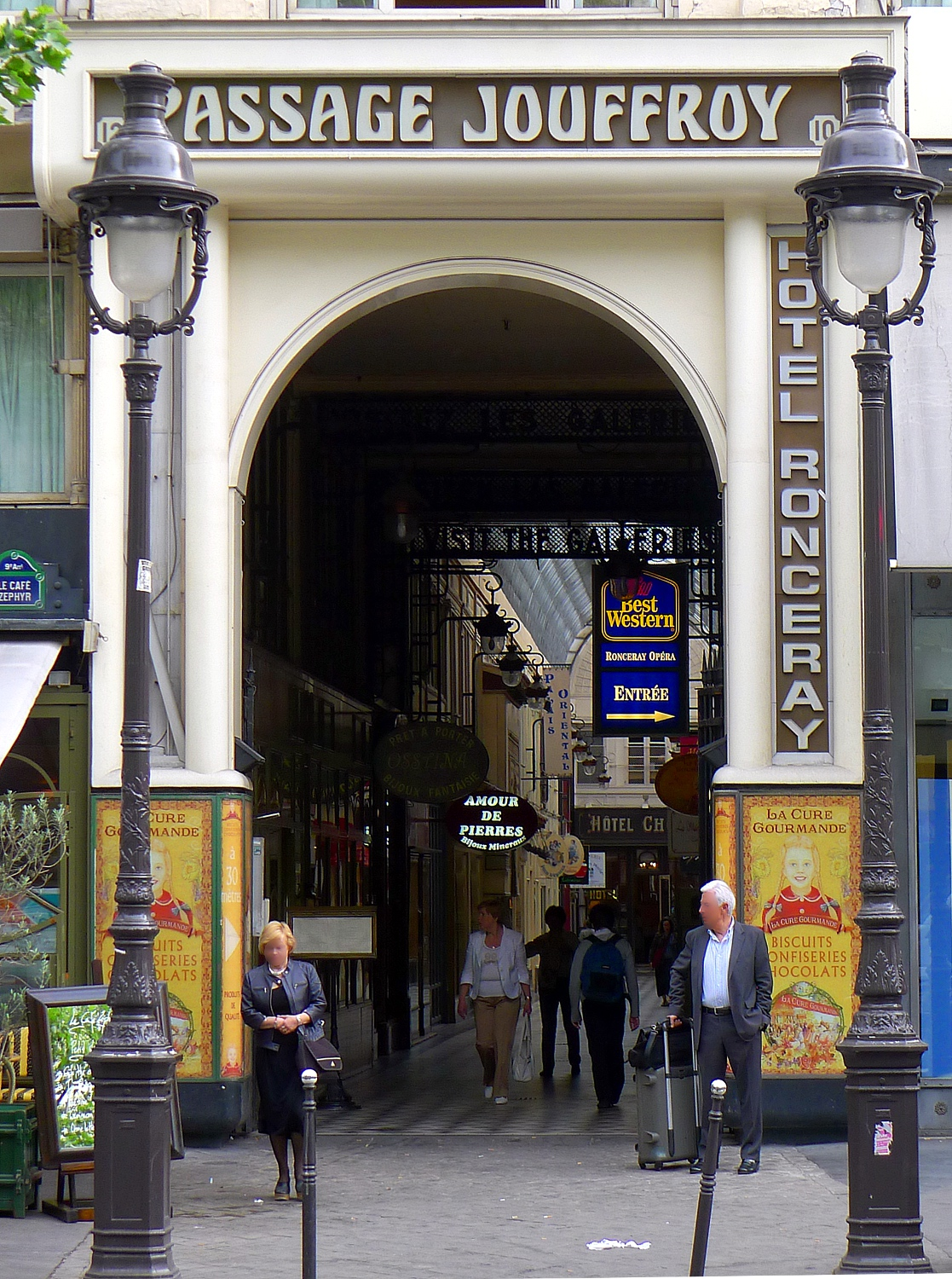
Entrance on the Boulevard Montmartre

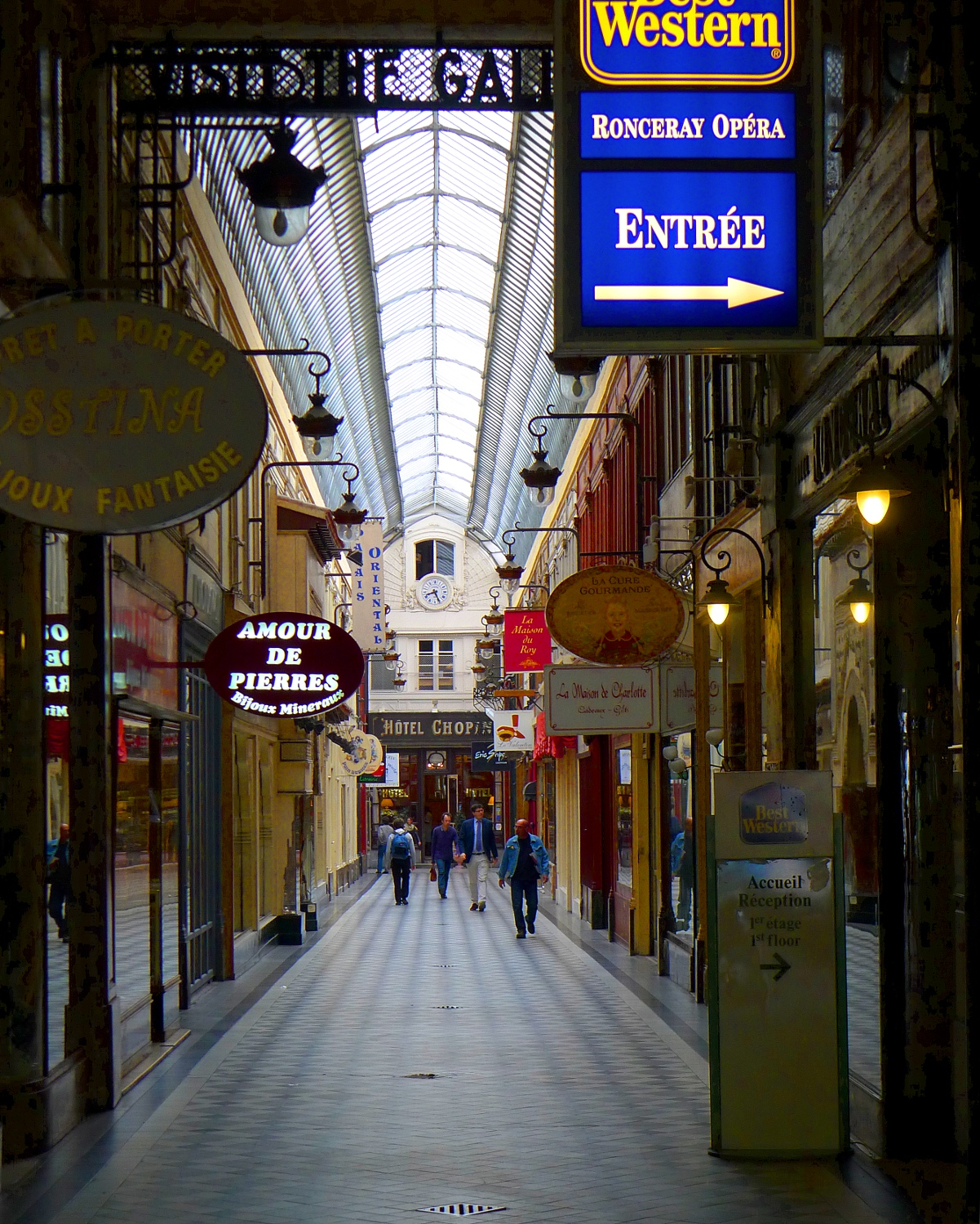
Main glass-covered passage

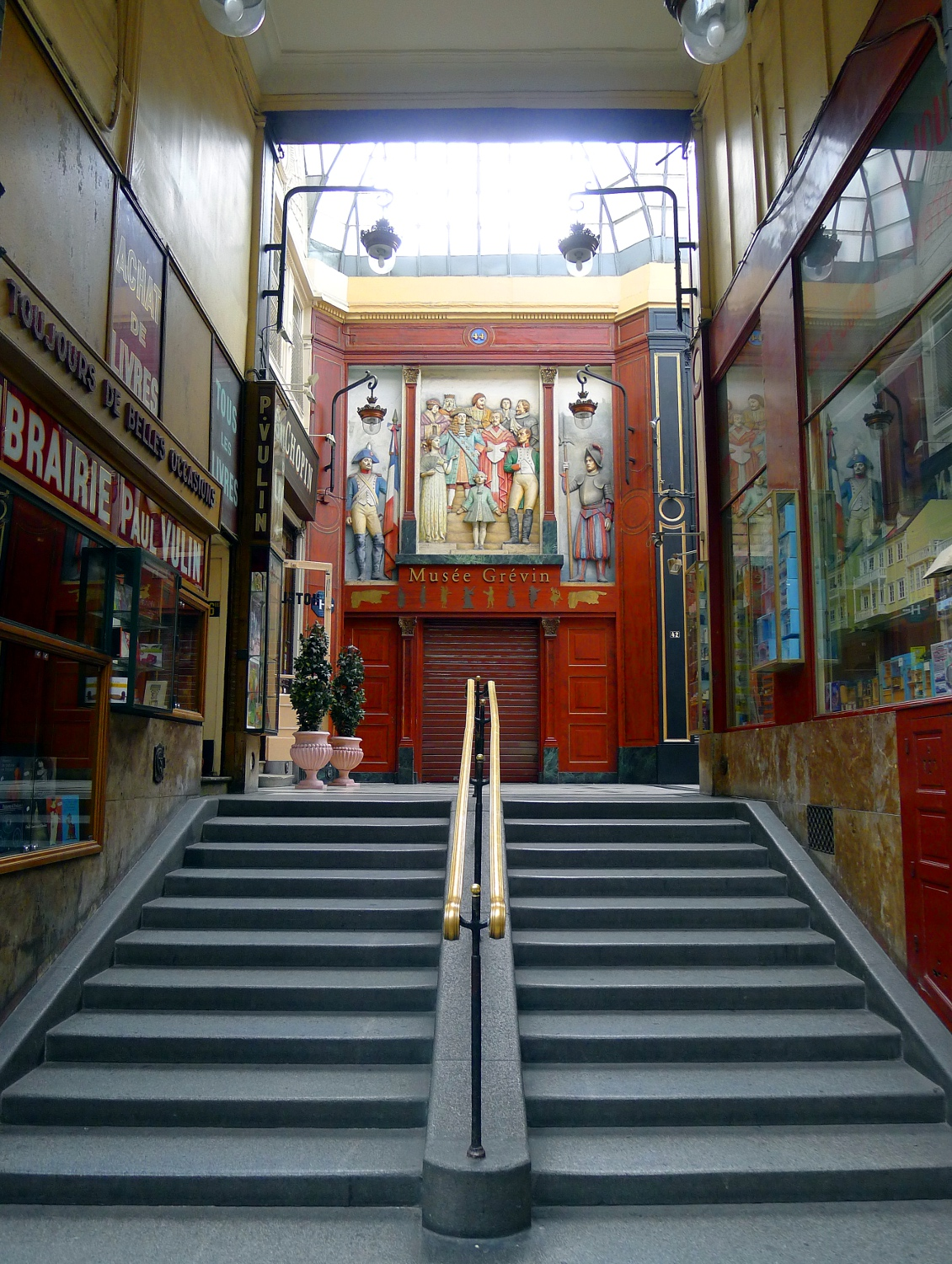
Entrance of the Musée Grévin

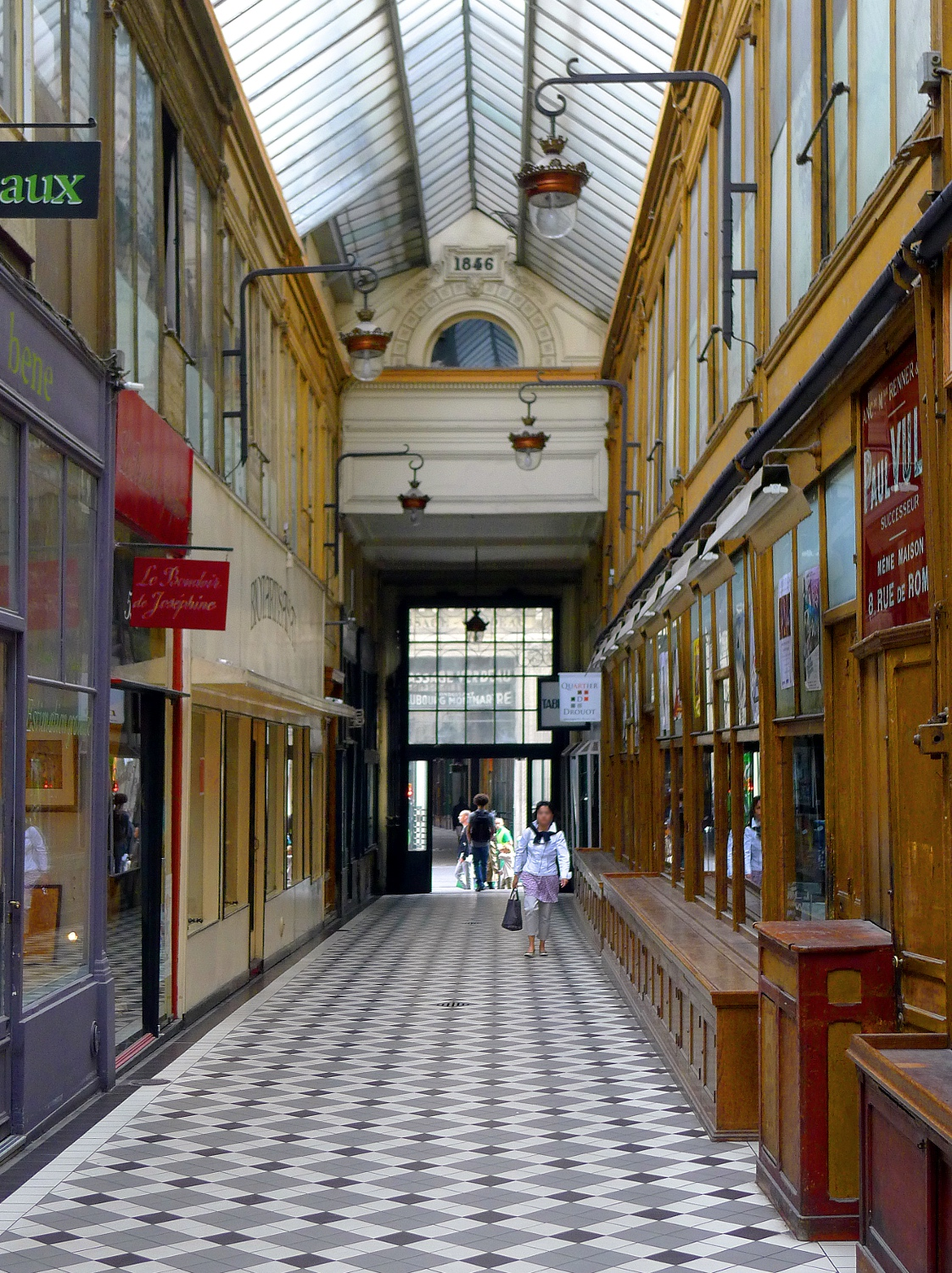
Passage looking towards the Rue de la Grange-Batelière
