= Richelieu–Drouot station =

Metro station in Paris, France

Richelieu–Drouot
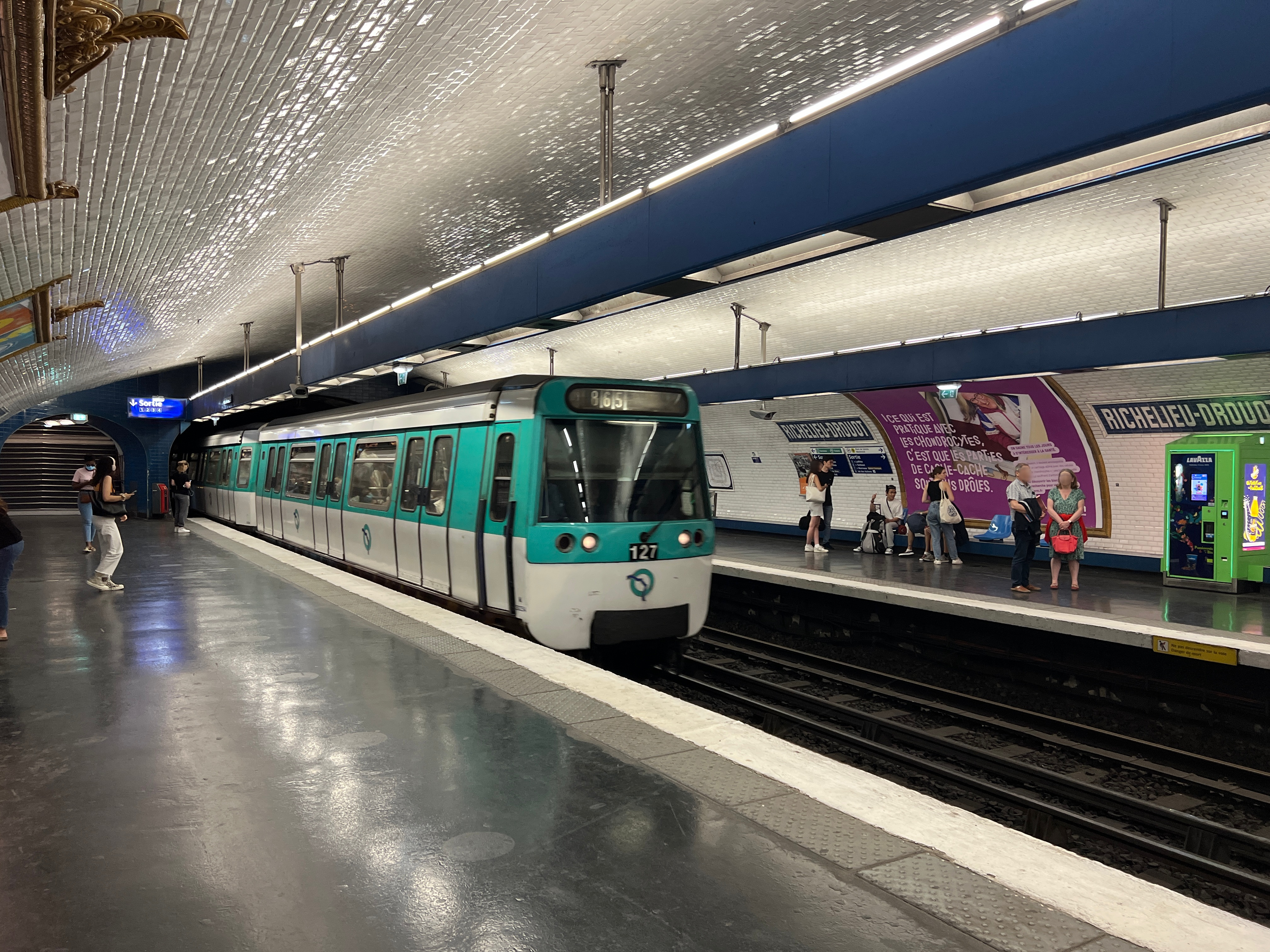
- Line 8 platforms

General information
- Location: 2nd arrondissement of Paris; Île-de-France; France
- Coordinates: 48°52′19″N 2°20′19″E
- System: Paris Métro station
- Owner: RATP
- Operator: RATP
- Line: Paris Metro Paris Metro Line 8 Paris Metro Line 9
- Platforms: 4 (side platforms)
- Tracks: 4

Construction
- Accessible: no

Other information
- Fare zone: 1

History
- Opened: 30 June 1928

Services
Preceding station	Paris Metro	Following station
Opéra towards Balard	Line 8	Grands Boulevards towards Pointe du Lac
Chaussée d'Antin–La Fayette towards Pont de Sèvres	Line 9	Grands Boulevards towards Mairie de Montreuil
Location
- Location within Paris

Richelieu–Drouot (French: [ʁiʃəljø dʁuo]) is a station on Lines 8 and 9 of the Paris Métro. Located in the 2nd arrondissement, it opened on 30 June 1928 with the extension of Line 8 from Opéra and Line 9 from Chaussée d'Antin (renamed Chaussée d'Antin–La Fayette in 1989).

== History ==
The station was opened on 30 June 1928 with the simultaneous commissioning of extensions of Line 8 from Opéra and Line 9 from Chaussée d'Antin. It then constituted the western terminus of these two lines (respectively from Porte d'Auteuil and Porte de Saint-Cloud) until 5 May 1931 when Line 8 was extended to Porte de Charenton and until 10 December 1933 for Line 9 which was then extended to Porte de Montreuil. The platforms of Line 8 are under the Boulevard des Italiens while the Line 9 platforms are under Boulevard Haussmann.

The Line 8 station is the first in the network to have been built with platforms 105 metres long, which would subsequently be extended to all the stopping points on the section up to Maisons-Alfort – Les Juilliotes and that of Balard at La Motte-Picquet–Grenelle, as well as at the new stations of Lines 1, 3, 7 and 9. These dimensions were planned to accommodate trains of seven cars, a project that did not materialise, except temporarily on Line 8 during the Paris Colonial Exposition of 1931 which was held at the Bois de Vincennes.

The station is named after the nearby Rue de Richelieu (to the southeast) and Rue Drouot (to the northeast). Cardinal Richelieu (1585–1642) was Secretary of State to Louis XIII. Antoine Drouot (1774–1847) was Aide-de-camp to Napoleon in 1813 and accompanied him to Elba and during his brief comeback known as the Hundred Days.

In addition, it was in this station that a young Frenchman, Jacques Fesch, was disarmed and arrested on 25 February 1954, after fleeing following the robbery of a bureau de change, followed by the murder of a police officer, crimes that led to his execution on 1 October 1957.

Like a third of the stations on the network, between 1974 and 1984 the stopping points on both lines were modernised by adopting the Andreu-Motte decorative style, blue for Line 8 and orange on Line 9, with preservation of the original earthenware in both cases.

As part of the RATP's Un métro + beau modernisation programme, all the station's corridors were renovated by 25 April 2015.

According to RATP estimates, the station saw 5,014,491 passengers enter in 2019, which places it in 81st position among Métro stations for usage. In 2020, with the COVID-19 crisis, its annual traffic fell to 2,313,492 passengers, relegating it to 99th place, before gradually rising in 2021 with 2,994,510 entries recorded, which demoted it to 108th position of stations in the network.

== War memorial ==
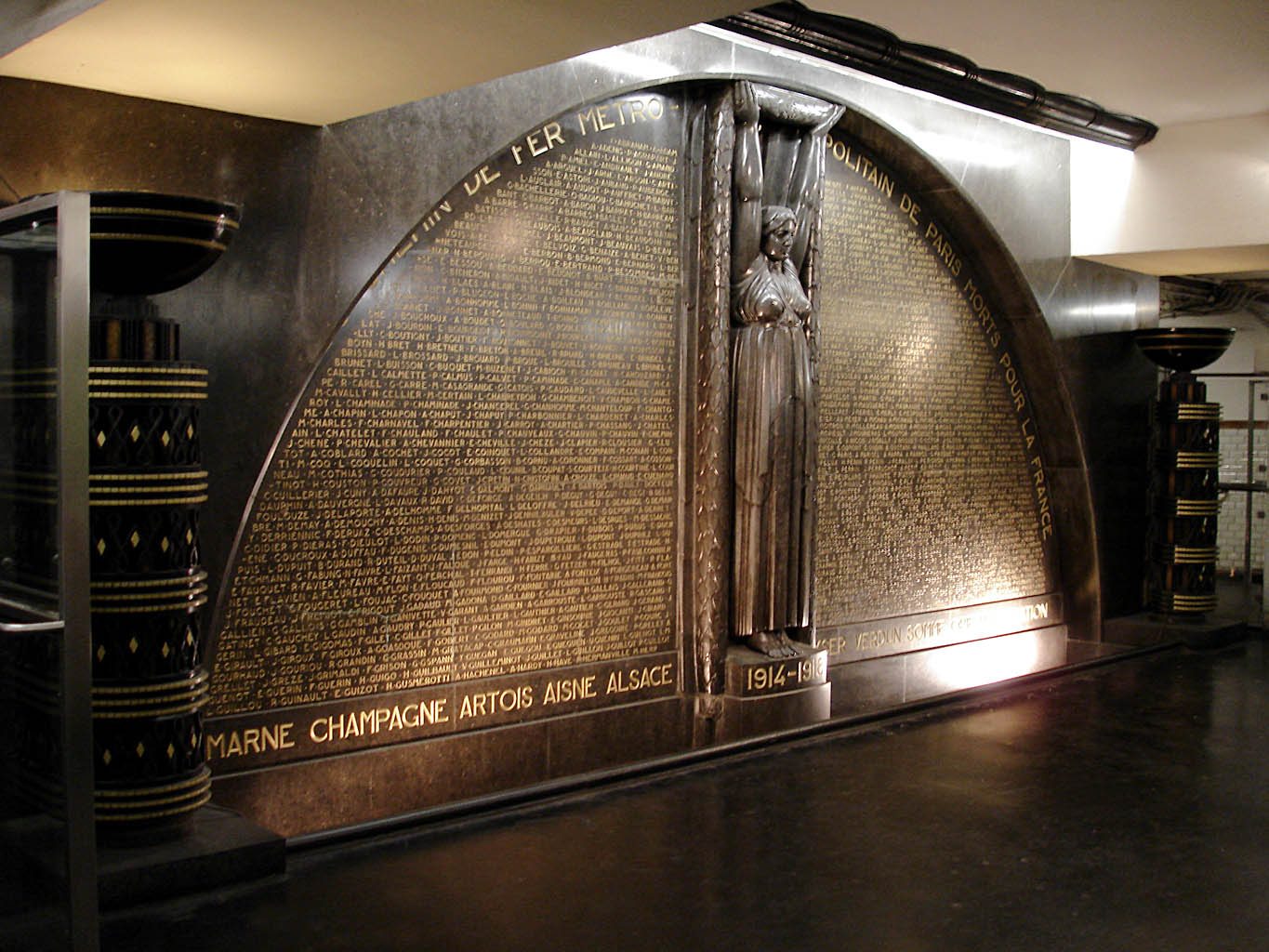
War memorial

Between the two access corridors to Line 9, opposite the sales area, is the war memorial of the Compagnie du chemin de fer métropolitain de Paris (CMP). Inaugurated in 1931, it was sculpted by Carlo Sarrabezolles.

This black marble monument is dedicated to the memory of the employees of the Métro who died for France. The central sculpture is decorated with a caryatid, which supports with its raised arms the twist of stone which surrounds it. It separates the semi-circle into two parts, inside which are inscribed the names of the Métro employees who disappeared during the First World War. The base of the monument bears the names of the battlefields of the Great War. The word Libération was added at the bottom right after the Second World War, to mark the participation of network agents in the French Resistance.

== Passenger services ==
=== Access ===
The station has eight entrances, six of which are adorned with Dervaux candelabras:

- Entrance 1 - Boulevard Haussmann, consisting of a fixed staircase, on Place Daniel-Iffla-Osiris at the corner of Boulevard Haussmann and the Boulevard des Italiens;
- Entrance 2 - Rue de Richelieu, consisting of a fixed staircase, located to the right of no. 3 on the Boulevard des Italiens;
- Entrance 3 - Boulevard Montmartre, consisting of a fixed staircase, located opposite no. 2 Boulevard Haussmann;
- Entrance 4 - Rue Chauchat, consisting of a fixed staircase, leading to the right of no. 6 Boulevard Haussmann;
- Entrance 5 - Rue Laffitte, consisting of a fixed staircase allowing exit only, located on Boulevard Haussmann behind the BNP Paribas headquarters;
- Entrance 6 - Rue Taitbout, consisting of a fixed staircase, located opposite the head office of BNP Paribas at no. 6 Boulevard des Italiens;
- Entrance 7 - Rue de Marivaux - Opéra-Comique, consisting of a fixed staircase, leading to the right of no. 11 Boulevard des Italiens;
- Entrance 8 - Boulevard des Italiens, consisting of an ascending escalator allowing only an exit, located opposite no. 2 of this boulevard.

=== Station layout ===
G	Street Level	Exit/Entrance
B1	Mezzanine	Fare control
B2	Side platform, doors will open on the right
B2	Westbound	← toward Balard (Opéra)
B2	Eastbound	toward Pointe du Lac (Grands Boulevards) →
B2	Side platform, doors will open on the right
B3	Side platform, doors will open on the right
B3	Westbound	← toward Pont de Sèvres (Chaussée d'Antin–La Fayette)
B3	Eastbound	toward Mairie de Montreuil (Grands Boulevards) →
B3	Side platform, doors will open on the right

=== Platforms ===
The platforms of the two lines are of a standard configuration. Two in number per stop, they are separated by the metro tracks located in the centre and the vault is elliptical. Their decoration is in the Andreu-Motte style. Those of Line 8 have a blue lighting canopy, benches, corridor outlets and the tunnel exit on the Pointe du Lac side is in flat blue tiles as well as blue Motte seats. Those of Line 9 have an orange lighting canopy, bench seats and exits in flat orange tiles and orange Motte seats. For both lines, these arrangements are combined with bevelled white ceramic tiles covering the side walls, the vault, and the rest of the tunnel exits, as well as advertising frames in honey-coloured earthenware with plant motifs and the name of the station is also in earthenware, in the interwar style of the original CMP.

These platforms are among the few to still present the Andreu-Motte style in its entirety, if we exclude the tunnel exits (whose treatment with flat coloured tiles was not systematic).

=== Bus connections ===
The station is served by lines 20, 32, 39, 45, 74 and 85 of the RATP Bus Network.

== Nearby ==
- Town hall of the 9th arrondissement
- Hôtel Drouot
- Opéra-Comique
- Passage des Princes
- Headquarters of the newspaper Le Figaro
- Golf-Drouot (defunct)
- Café Anglais (defunct)

== Gallery ==
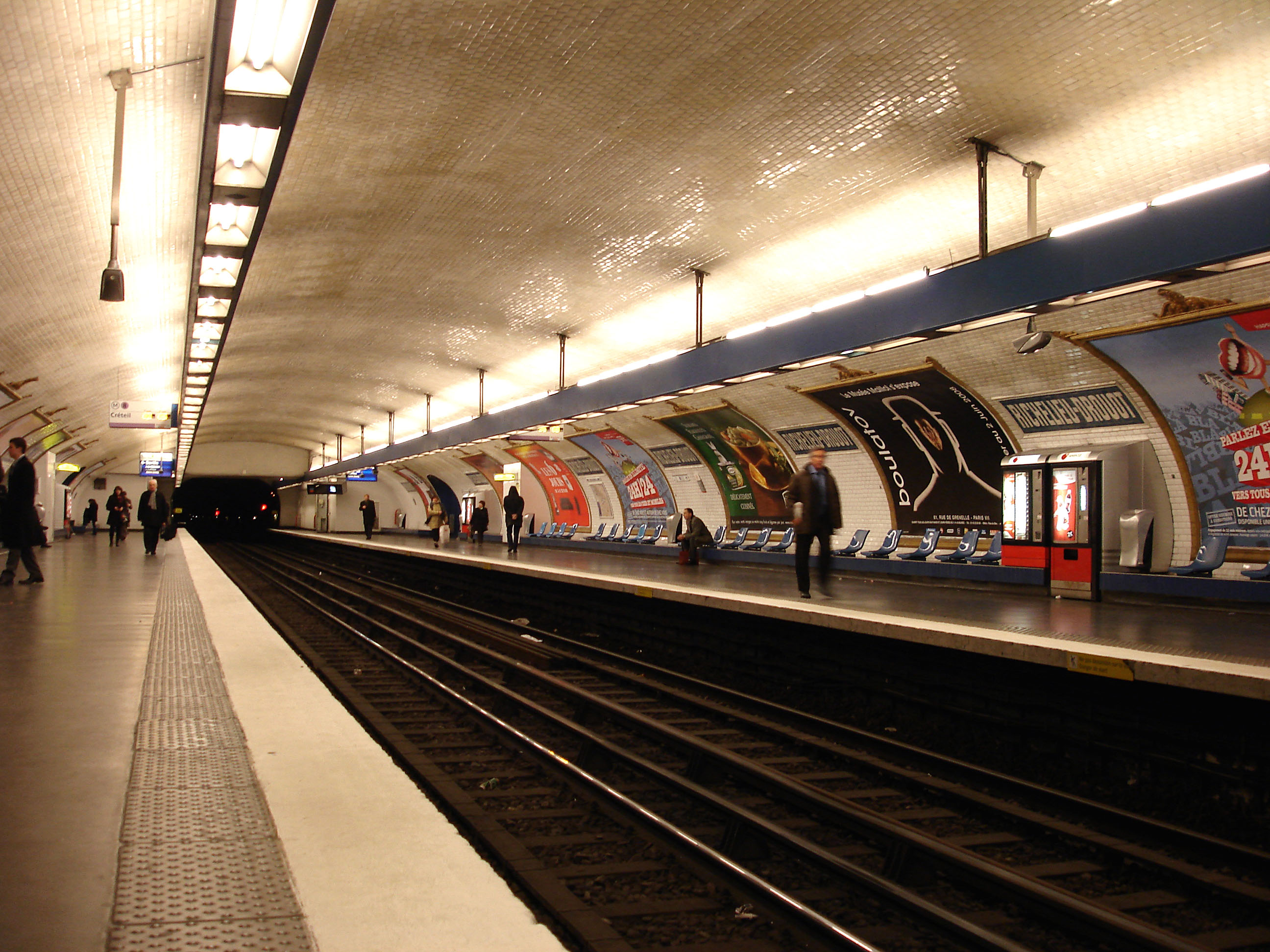
Line 8 platforms at Richelieu–Drouot

MF 77 rolling stock on Line 8 at Richelieu–Drouot

== Sources ==
- Roland, Gérard (2003). Stations de métro. D’Abbesses à Wagram. Éditions Bonneton.
