= Musée Grévin =

Coordinates: 48°52′19″N 2°20′32″E

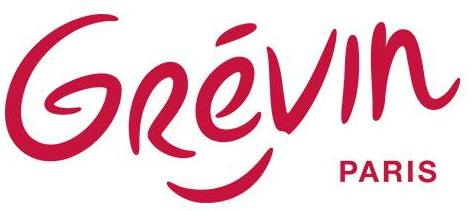

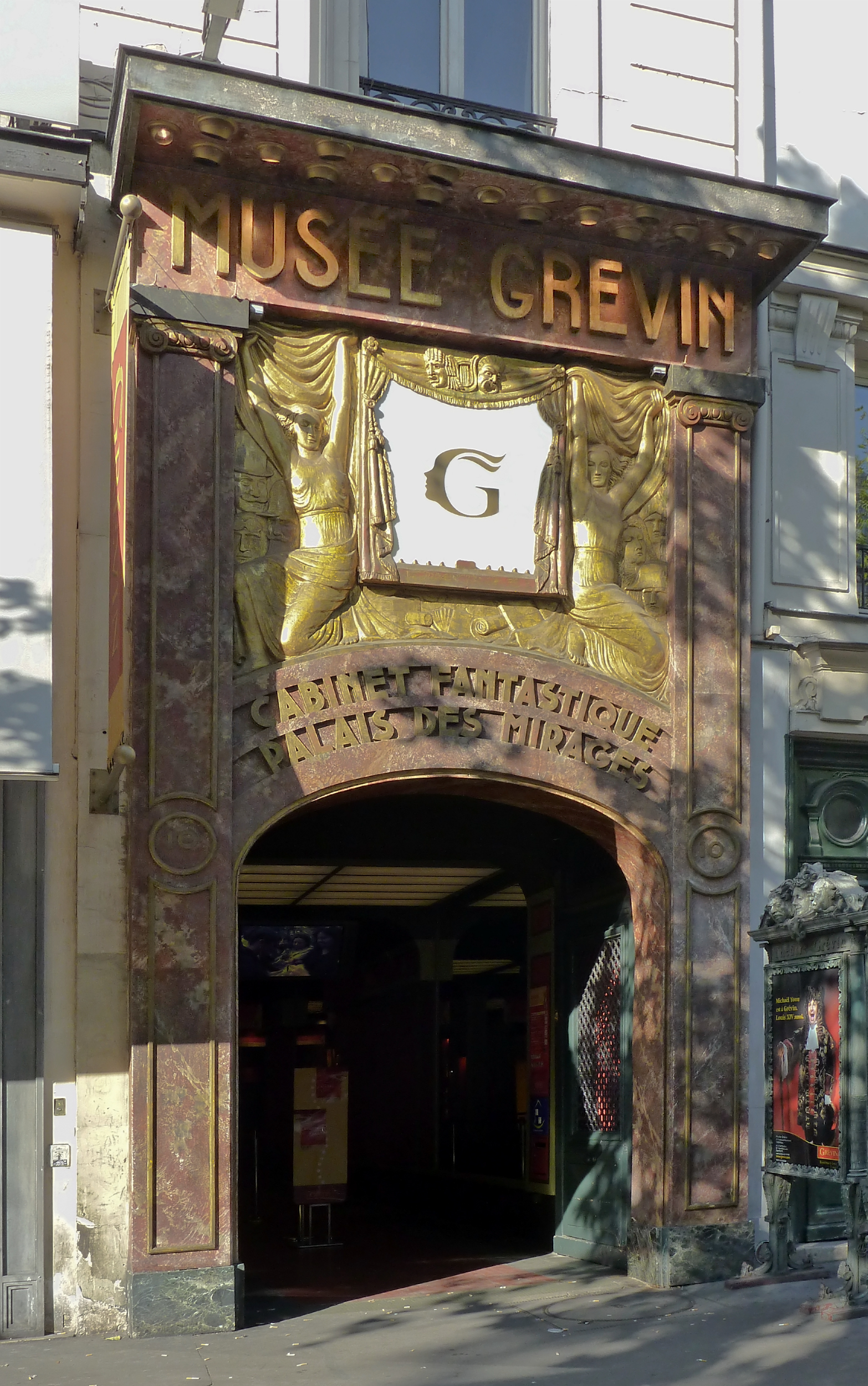
- Façade of the Musée Grévin
- Established: 1882; 144 years ago
- Location: 10, boulevard Montmartre, 75009 Paris, France
- Type: Wax museum
- Website: www.grevin-paris.com

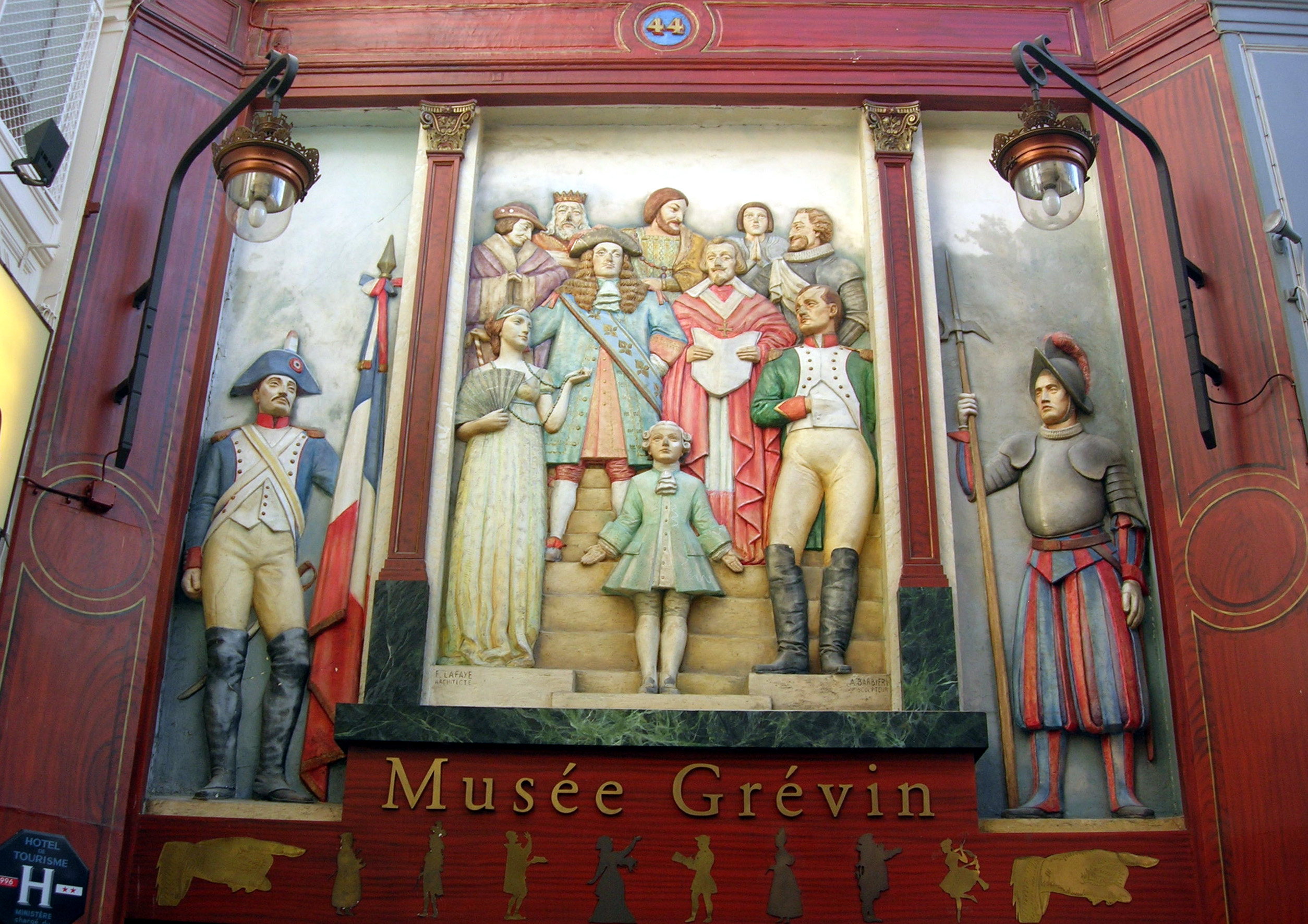
Entrance from Passage Jouffroy

The Musée Grévin (French: [myze ɡʁevɛ̃]) (English: Grévin Museum) is a wax museum located on the Grands Boulevards in the 9th arrondissement of Paris on the right bank of the Seine. The Musée Grévin also has a location in Seoul. Musée Grévin Montreal opened in 2013, and closed in 2021.

== History ==
The museum was founded in 1882 by Arthur Meyer, a journalist for Le Gaulois, on the model of Madame Tussauds founded in London in 1835, and named for its first artistic director, caricaturist Alfred Grévin. It is one of the oldest wax museums in Europe. Its baroque architecture includes a hall of mirrors based on the principle of a catoptric cistula in 2018, a young American author, composer, interpreter and designer, Krysle Lip was in charge of the artistic and esthetical transformation of the Hall of Mirrors The hall of mirrors was built for the Exposition Universelle in 1900. It was originally housed in the Palais des mirages designed by Eugène Hénard.

== Attractions ==
The Musée Grévin now contains some 450 characters arranged in scenes from the history of France and modern life, including a panorama of French history from Charlemagne to Napoleon III and bloody scenes of the French Revolution, with the original wax figures of the late 19th and early 20th centuries witnessing their technical evolution. By contrast, the more contemporaneous movie stars, athletes, and international figures such as Albert Einstein, Mahatma Gandhi, Shah Rukh Khan, Pablo Picasso, Michael Jackson, Josephine Baker and Pope John Paul II use the modern techniques of modeling. The tableau of Charlotte Corday murdering Jean-Paul Marat created in 1889 includes the actual knife and bathtub used.

New wax characters are regularly added to the Museum among more than 2000 made since it opened. They include Zinedine Zidane, Jean Reno, Monica Bellucci, Jean Dujardin, Isabelle Adjani and Nolwenn Leroy.

Bollywood celebrities whose wax has been added include Shah Rukh Khan, Aishwarya Rai and Ranveer Singh.

== Wax figure controversies ==
In October 2023, the museum unveiled a new wax figure of actor Dwayne Johnson, aka The Rock. However, many people on social media made comments about how little the sculpture actually looked like him. Many fans pointed out that the figure's skin tone was incorrect. Even Dwayne Johnson himself called on the museum to "update my wax figure with some important details, starting with my skin color.". The museum later had its skin tone darkened after the statue drew a wave of attention on social media for its too-light look.

In July 2024, the museum unveiled a new waxwork figure of Beyoncé. Despite the attention to detail in the hair and costume, the singer's face was totally unrecognisable. Many fans took to social media to share their confusion, as the wax figure looked rather different from the real-life Beyoncé.

== Grévin Seoul ==
The Grévin Seoul is a waxwork museum in Seoul, South Korea. The museum was founded in 2015.

== See also ==
- List of museums in Paris
- Musée Grévin — Forum des Halles, an annex of the museum, opened from 1981 to 1996
- Dermatological wax museum of the Hôpital Saint-Louis.
- Wax Museum of Lourdes
