= Buzenval station =

Metro station in Paris, France

Buzenval
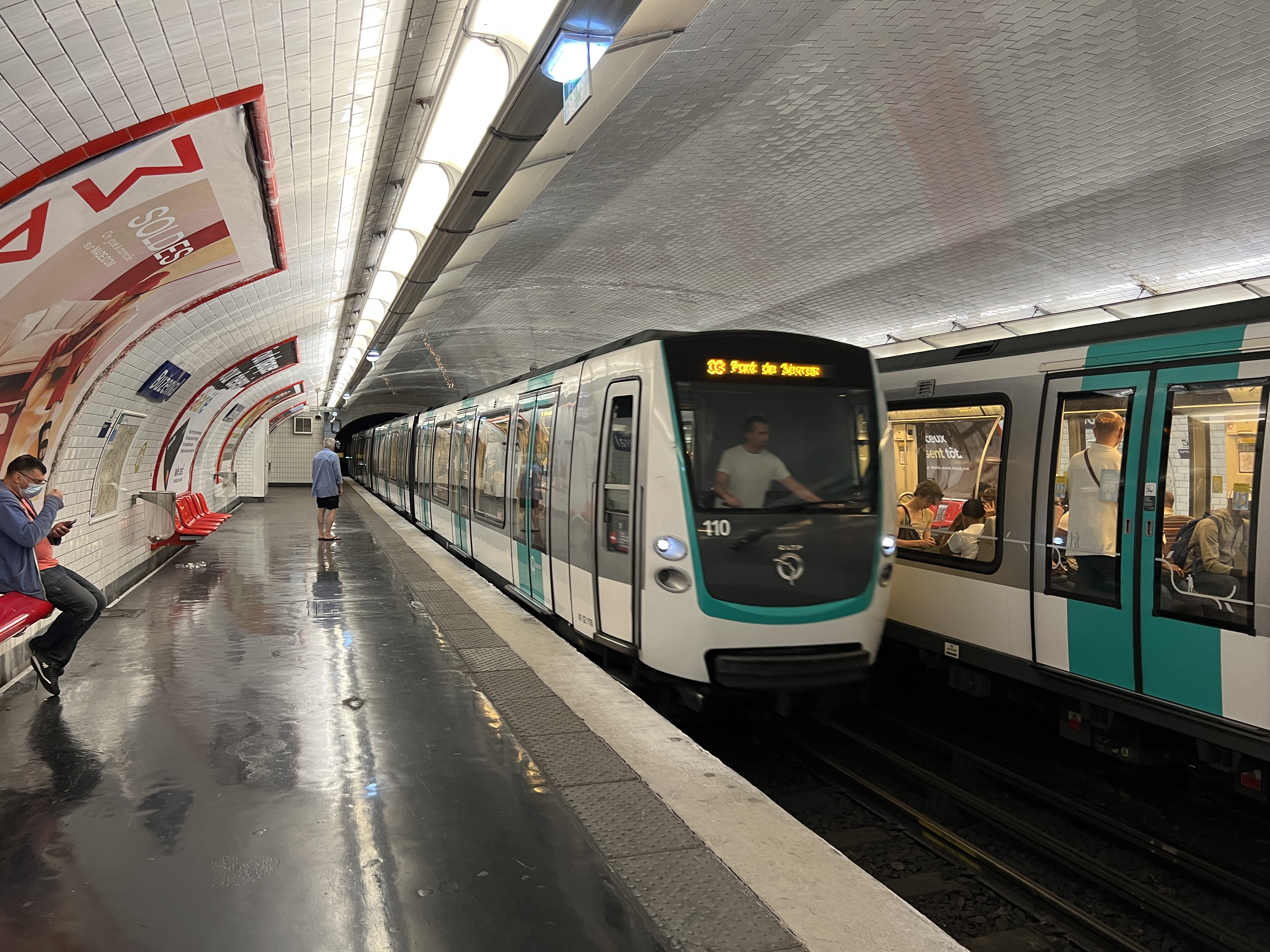
- MF 01 rolling stock at Buzenval

General information
- Location: 20th arrondissement of Paris; Île-de-France; France
- Coordinates: 48°51′07″N 2°24′07″E
- System: Paris Métro station
- Owner: RATP
- Operator: RATP
- Line: Paris Metro Paris Metro Line 9
- Platforms: 2 (side platforms)
- Tracks: 2

Construction
- Accessible: no

Other information
- Station code: 05-05
- Fare zone: 1

History
- Opened: 10 December 1933

Passengers
- 1,448,855 (2021)

Services
Preceding station	Paris Metro	Following station
Nation towards Pont de Sèvres	Line 9	Maraîchers towards Mairie de Montreuil
Location
- Location within Paris

Buzenval (French pronunciation: [byzɑ̃val]) is a station on Line 9 of the Paris Métro in the 20th arrondissement. It lies under the Rue de Buzenval, which it is named after. Its name commemorates the Battle of Buzenval which took place on 19 January 1871, part of the Siege of Paris during the Franco-Prussian War. It occurred in the village of Buzenval, now part of the Hauts-de-Seine commune of Rueil-Malmaison, west of Paris.

The "Tarzan of Buzenval" was the nickname of Laurent Dauthuille, a boxer of the 1950s.

== History ==
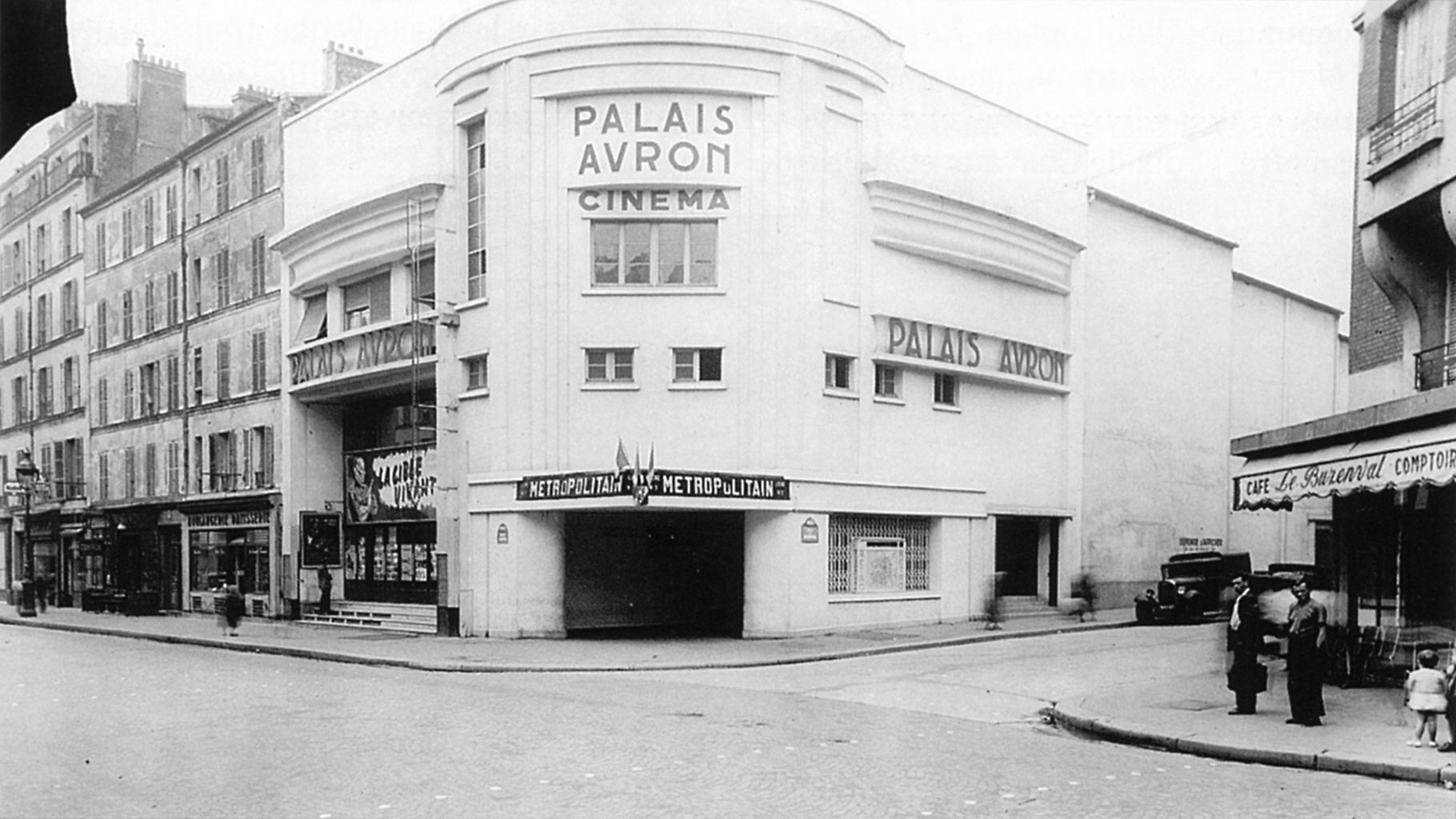
The entrance to the station in the 1940s, now access 1.

The station opened on 10 December 1933 as part of the line's extension from between Richelieu–Drouot to Porte de Montreuil.

Its main entrance was originally integrated with the former Palais Avron cinema, which opened in September 1936, replacing a former cinema on the same site, the Grand Cinéma Buzenval that opened in 1913 and closed in 1931 (initially named Casino de Buzenval). It has been repurposed as a supermarket since 1977, currently an Auchan, along with many other local cinemas that were converted into commercial spaces during the same period.

As part of the "Un métro + beau" programme by the RATP, the station's corridors and platforms were renovated and modernised on 2 December 2008.

In 2019, the station was used by 1,941,769 passengers, making it the 249th busiest of the Métro network out of 302 stations.

In 2020, the station was used by 1,080,500 passengers amidst the COVID-19 pandemic, making it the 234th busiest of the Métro network out of 304 stations.

In 2021, the station was used by 1,448,855 passengers, making it the 239th busiest of the Métro network out of 304 stations.

== Passenger services ==
=== Access ===
The station has 2 accesses:

- Access 1: rue de Buzenval
- Access 2: rue d'Avron (an exit-only escalator)

=== Station layout ===
Street Level
B1	Mezzanine
Platform level	Side platform, doors will open on the right
Platform level	Westbound	← toward Pont de Sèvres (Nation)
Platform level	Eastbound	toward Mairie de Montreuil (Maraîchers) →
Platform level	Side platform, doors will open on the right

=== Platforms ===
The station has a standard configuration with 2 tracks surrounded by 2 side platforms.

=== Other connections ===
The station is also served by lines 57 and La Traverse de Charonne (501) of the RATP bus network.

== Nearby ==
- Jardin Casque-d'Or
- Square Emily-Dickinson
- Square Sarah-Bernhardt

== Gallery ==
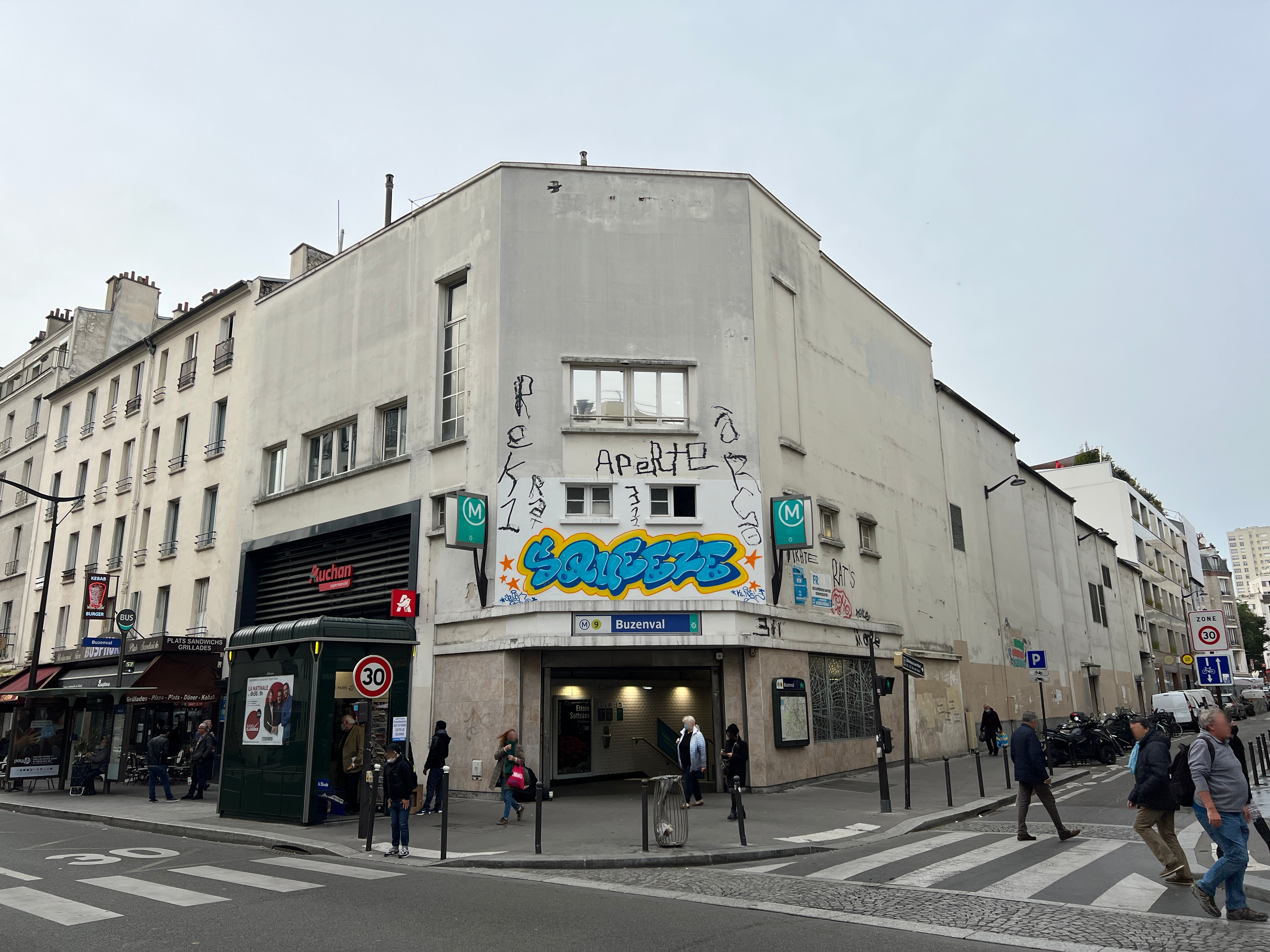
Access 1

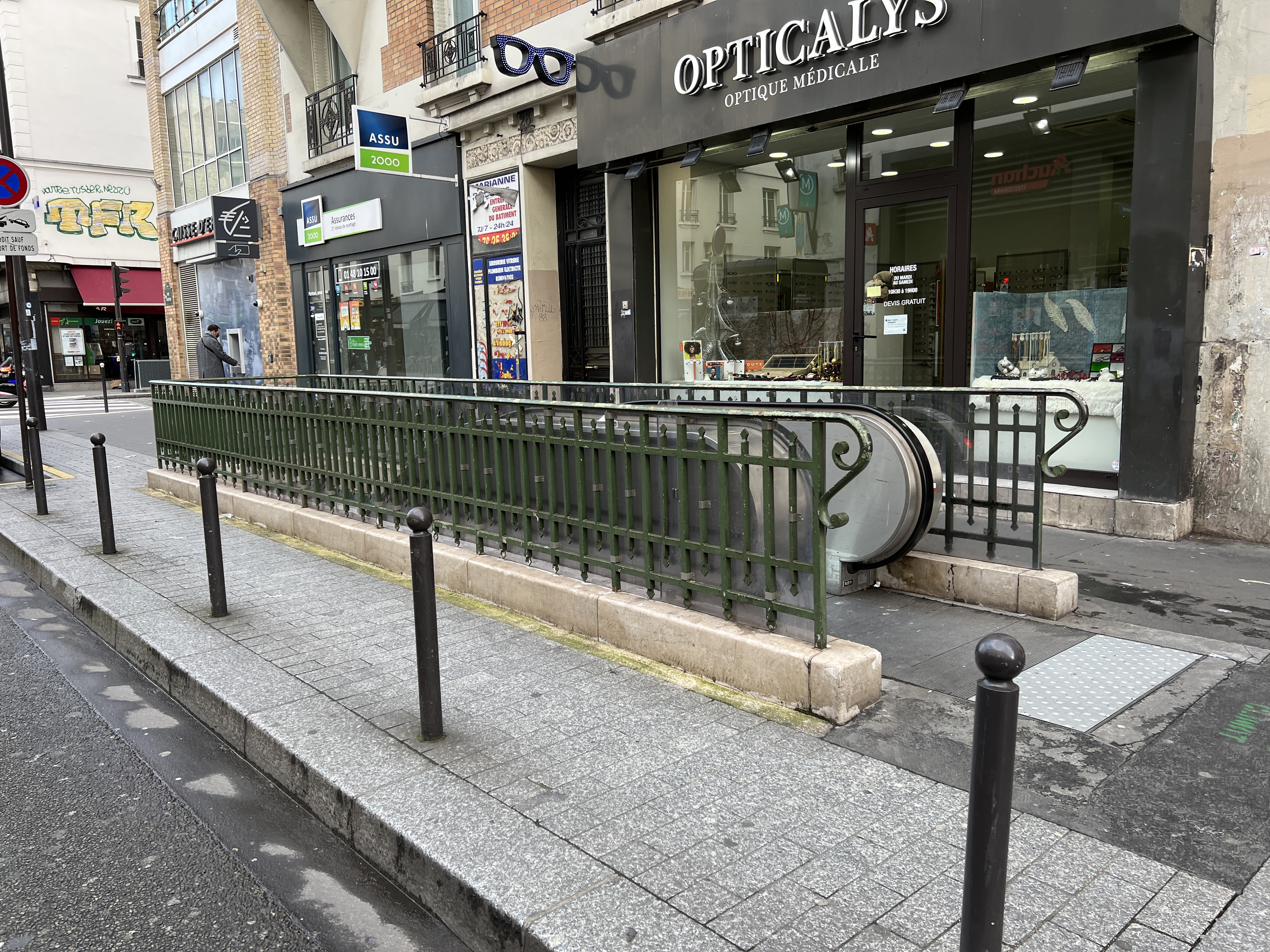
Access 2
