= Robespierre station =

Metro station in Montreuil, France

Robespierre
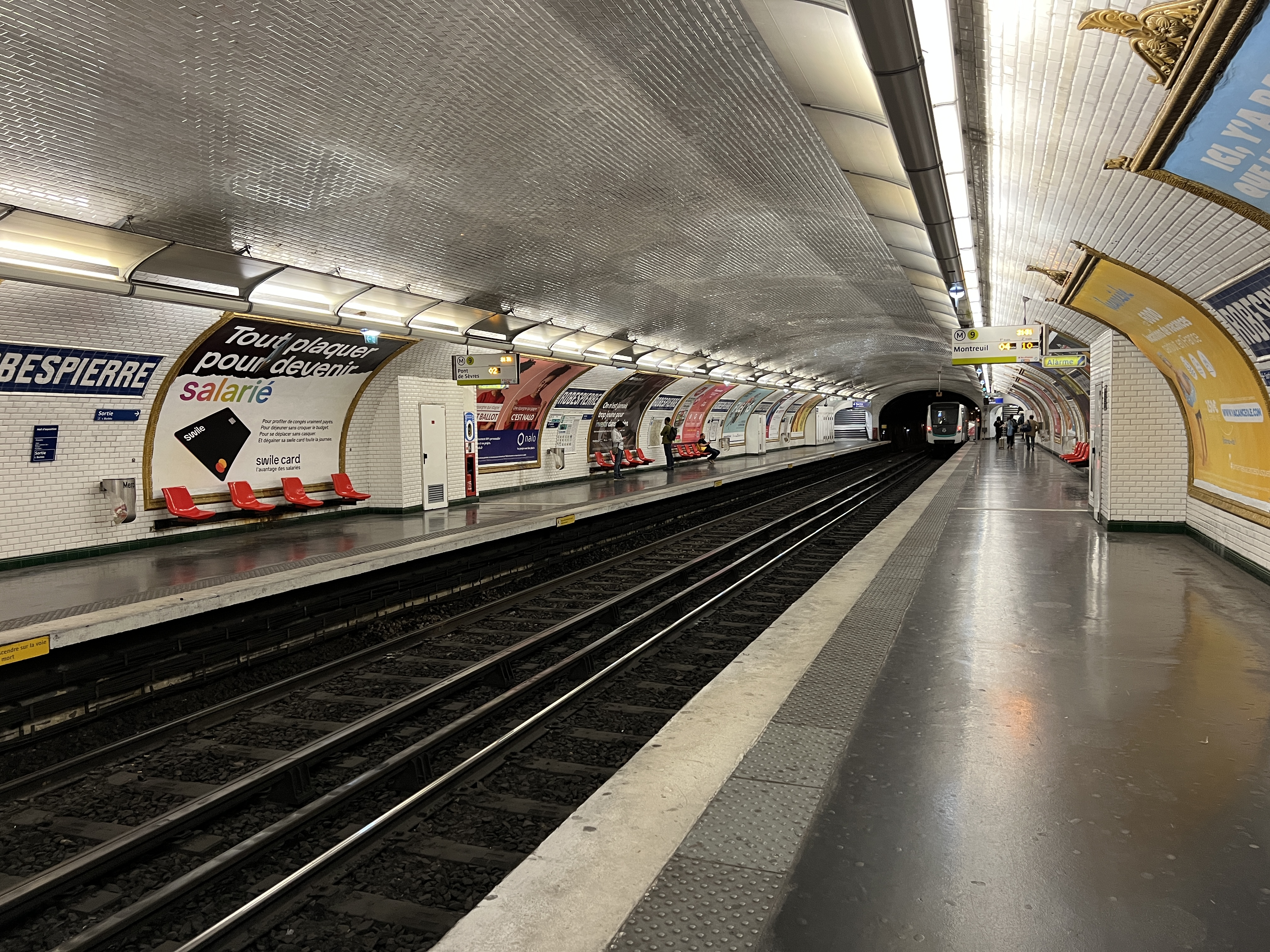
- MF 01 rolling stock leaving Robespierre towards Mairie de Montreuil

General information
- Location: Montreuil, Seine-Saint-Denis; Île-de-France; France
- Coordinates: 48°51′20″N 2°25′25″E
- System: Paris Métro station
- Owner: RATP
- Operator: RATP
- Line: Paris Metro Paris Metro Line 9
- Platforms: 2 (side platforms)
- Tracks: 2

Other information
- Station code: 05-02
- Fare zone: 1

History
- Opened: 14 October 1937

Passengers
- 2,281,953

Services
Preceding station	Paris Metro	Following station
Porte de Montreuil towards Pont de Sèvres	Line 9	Croix de Chavaux towards Mairie de Montreuil
Location
- Location within Paris

Robespierre (French pronunciation: [ʁɔbɛspjɛʁ]) is a station on Line 9 of the Paris Métro. It is located in the suburb of Montreuil, just east of Paris. It is named after the nearby Rue Robespierre, which in turn was named after Maximilien Robespierre (1758–1794), one of the best-known leaders of the French Revolution.

== History ==
The station was opened on 14 October 1937 with the extension of the line from Porte de Montreuil to Mairie de Montreuil.

In 2019, the station was used by 4,221,091 passengers, making it the 109th busiest of the Métro network out of 302 stations.

In 2020, the station was used by 2,281,953 passengers amidst the COVID-19 pandemic, making it the 100th busiest of the Métro network out of 305 stations.

== Passenger services ==
=== Access ===
The station has 2 accesses:

- Access 1: rue Robespierre
- Access 2: rue Barbès (Art Deco style)

=== Station layout ===
Street Level
B1	Mezzanine
Line 9 platforms	Side platform, doors will open on the right
Line 9 platforms	Westbound	← toward Pont de Sèvres (Porte de Montreuil)
Line 9 platforms	Eastbound	toward Mairie de Montreuil (Croix de Chavaux) →
Line 9 platforms	Side platform, doors will open on the right

=== Platforms ===
The station has a standard configuration with two tracks surrounded by two side platforms and the vault is elliptical. The decoration is in the style used for the most of metro stations. The lighting canopies are white and rounded in the Gaudin style of the metro revival of the 2000s, and the bevelled white ceramic tiles cover the walls, the vault, the tunnel exits, and the corridor openings. The advertising frames are made of honey-coloured earthenware and the name of the station is also made of earthenware in the style of the original CMP. The Motte style seats are red in colour.

=== Other connections ===
The station is also served by line 318 of the RATP bus network.

== Gallery ==
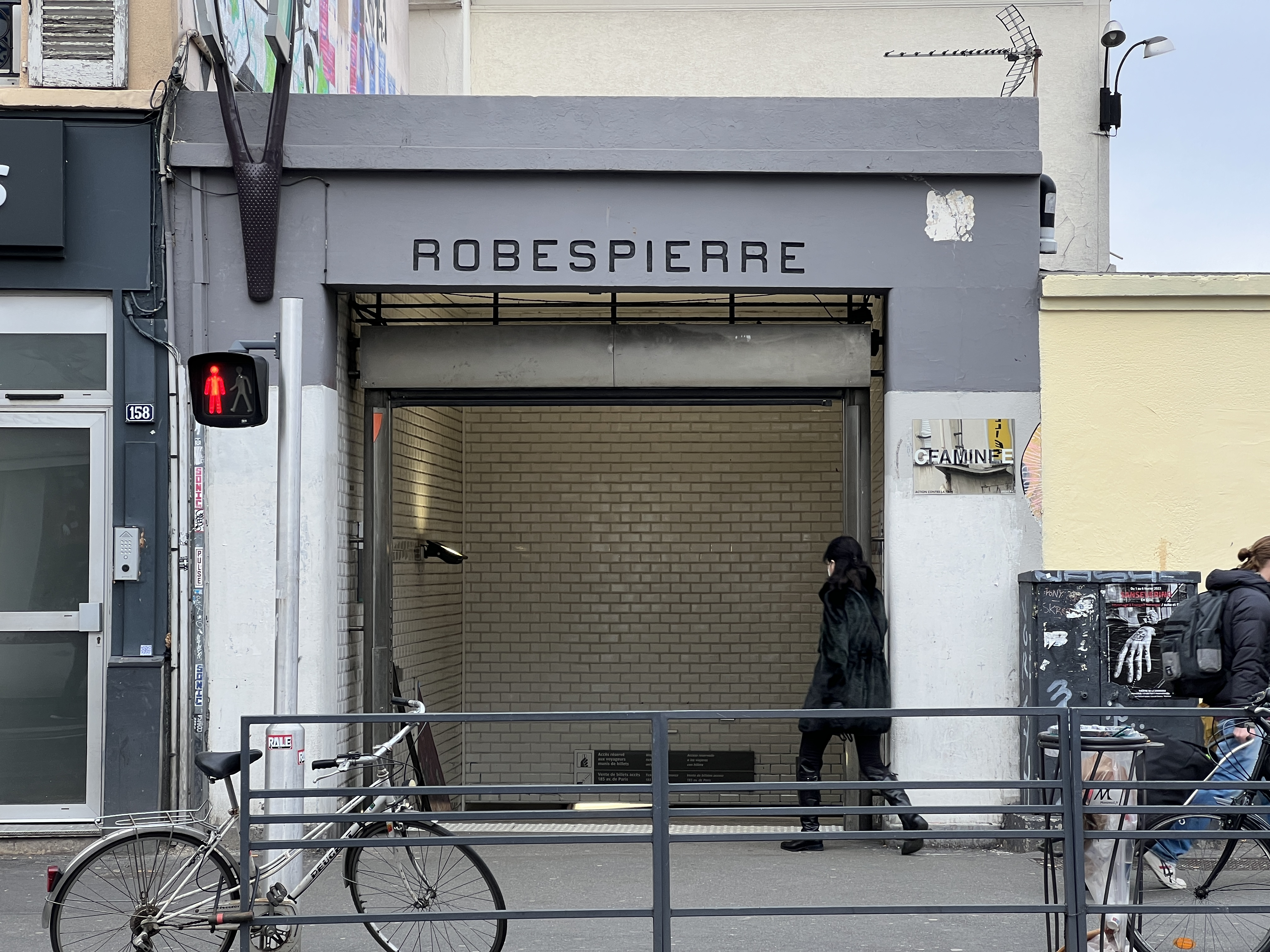
Entrance 1

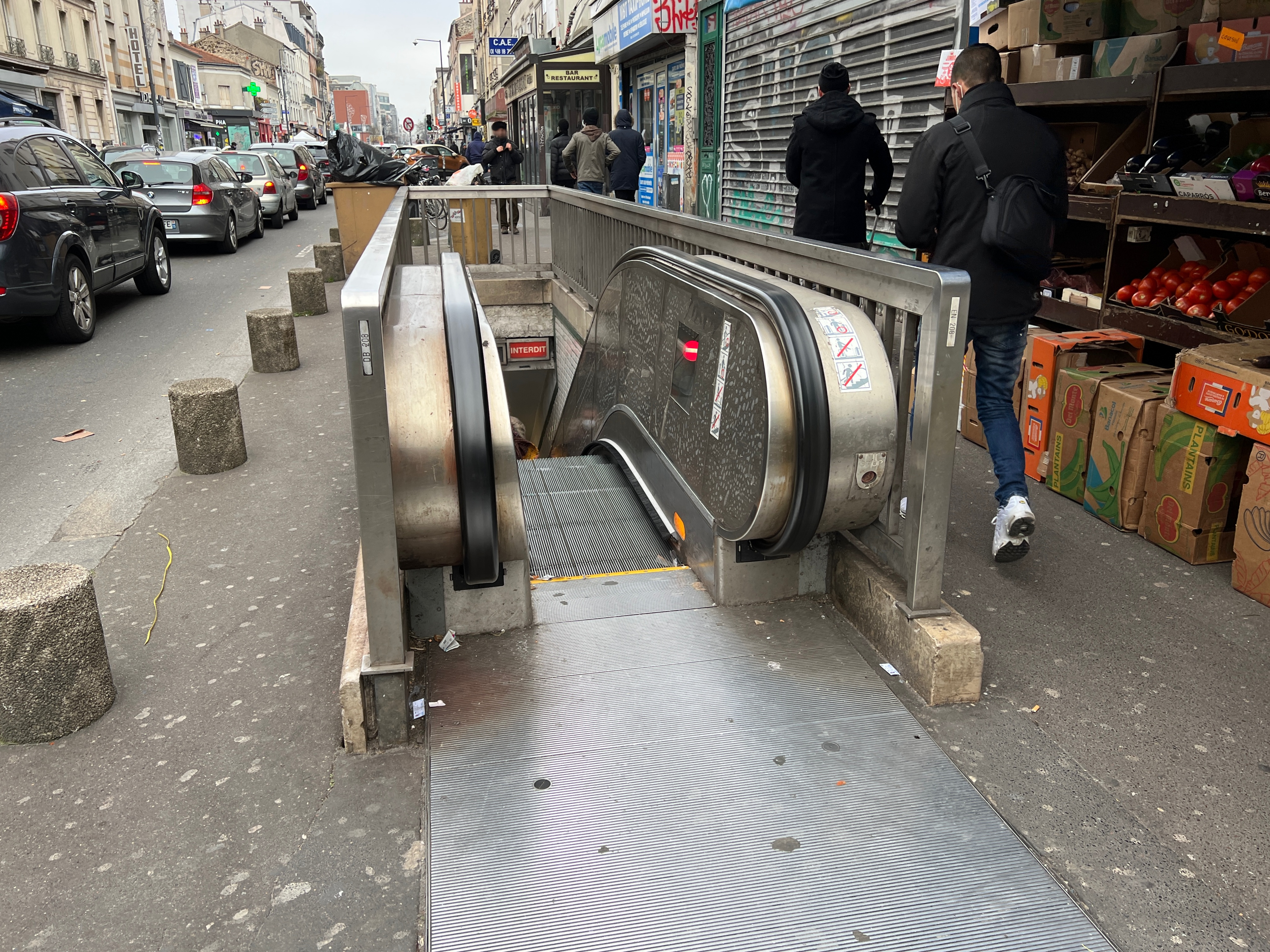
Entrance 1

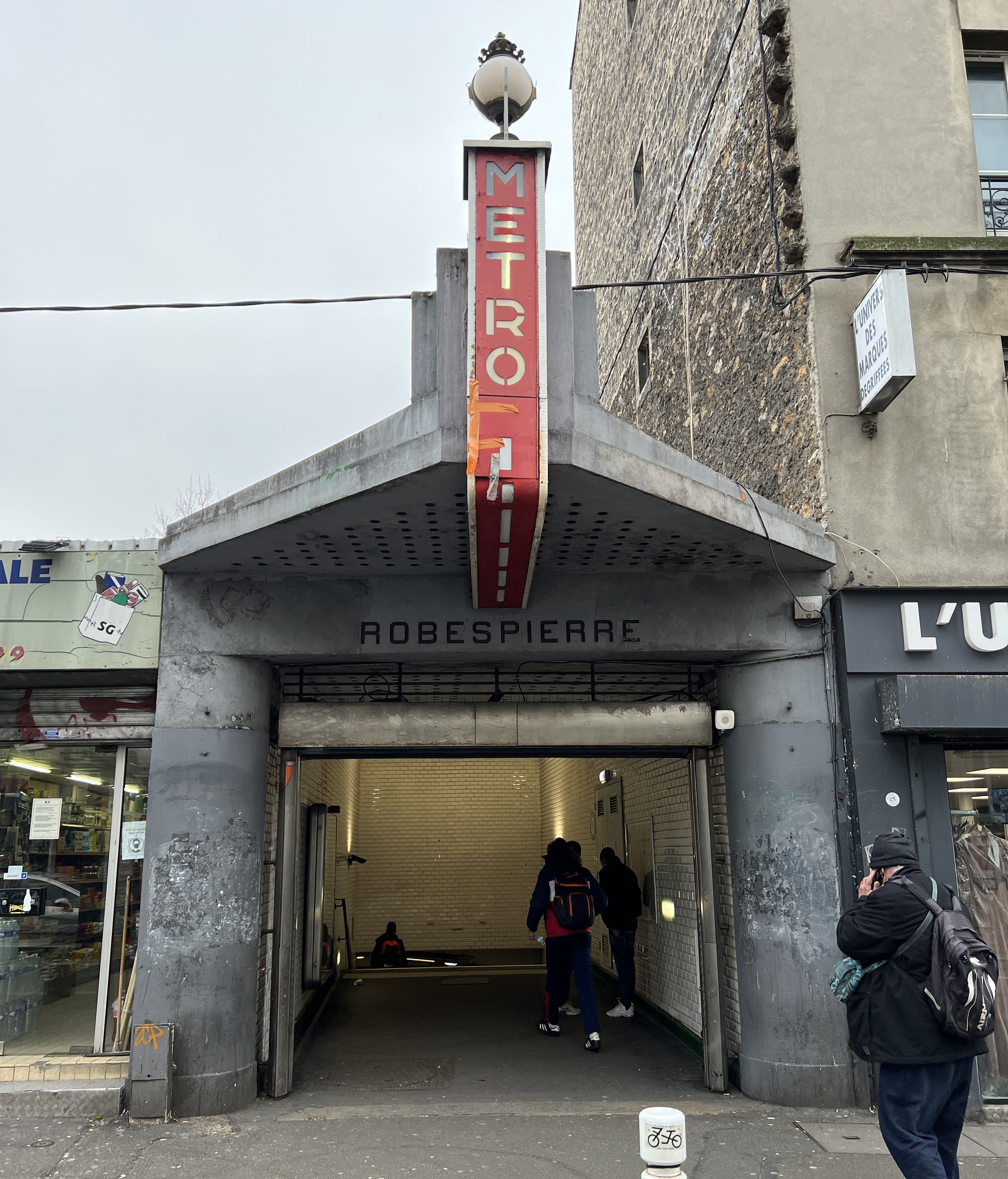
Entrance 2

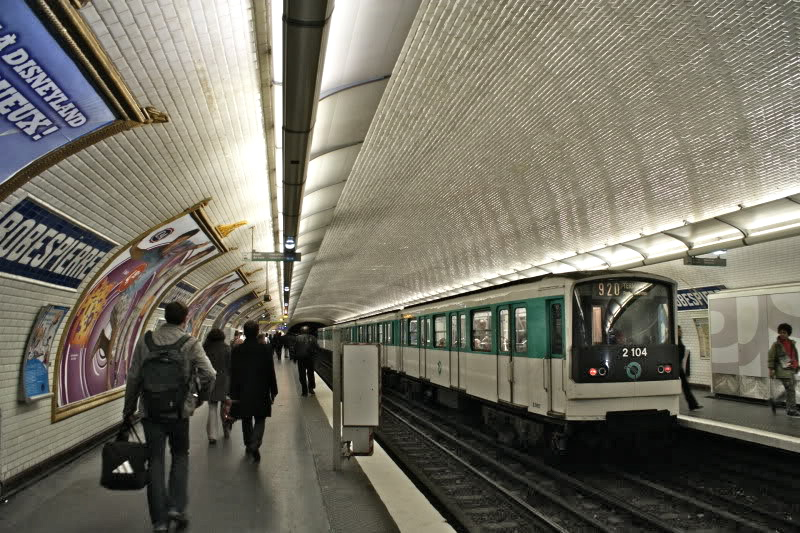
MF 67 rolling stock before his replacement by MF 01
