= Maraîchers station =

Metro station in Paris, France

Maraîchers
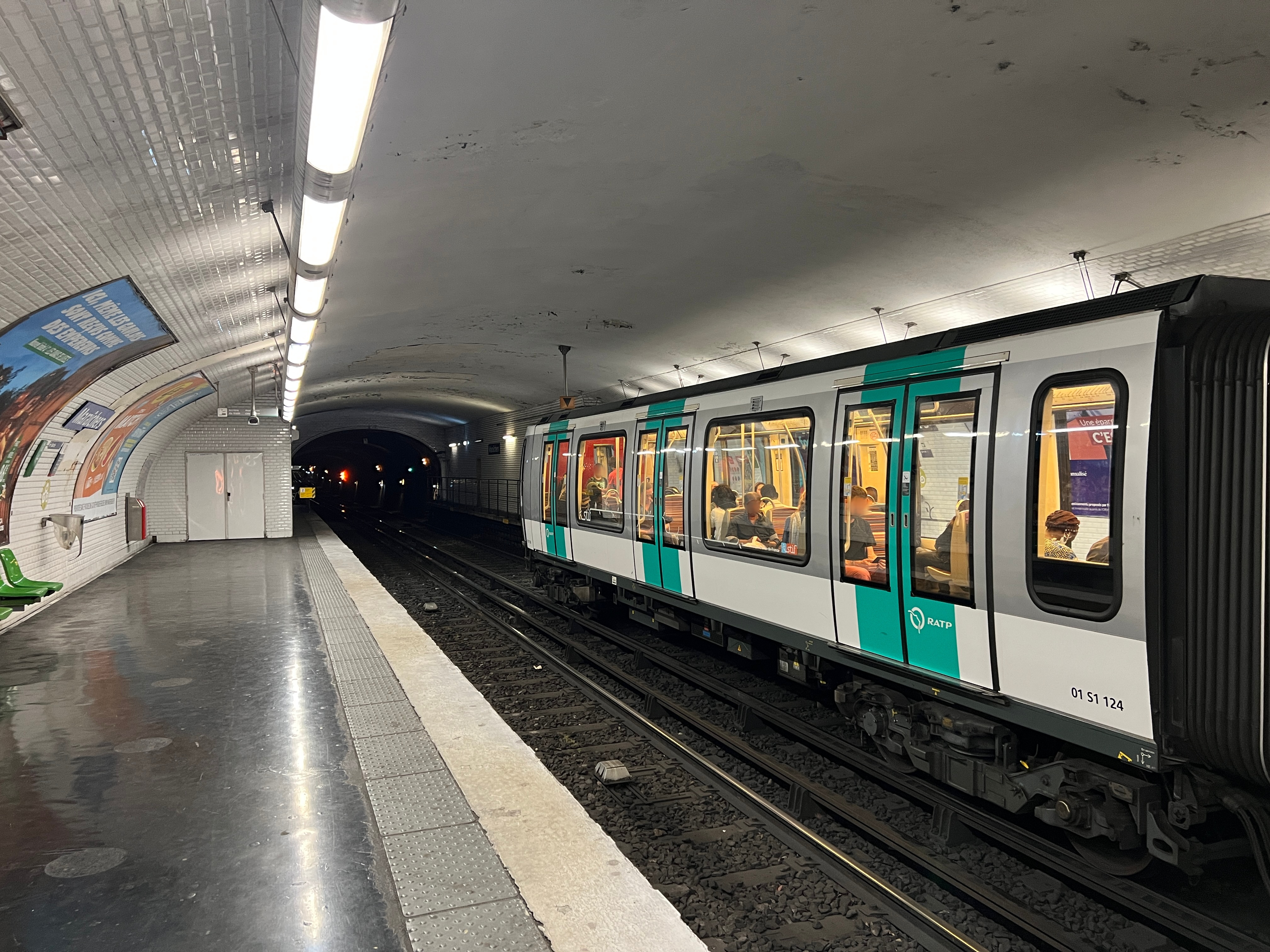
- MF 01 at Maraîchers

General information
- Location: 20th arrondissement of Paris; Île-de-France; France
- Coordinates: 48°51′10″N 2°24′25″E
- System: Paris Métro station
- Owner: RATP
- Operator: RATP
- Line: Paris Metro Paris Metro Line 9
- Platforms: 2 (side platforms)
- Tracks: 2

Construction
- Accessible: no

Other information
- Station code: 05-04
- Fare zone: 1

History
- Opened: 10 December 1933

Passengers
- 1,994,064 (2021)

Services
Preceding station	Paris Metro	Following station
Buzenval towards Pont de Sèvres	Line 9	Porte de Montreuil towards Mairie de Montreuil
Location
- Location within Paris

Maraîchers (French pronunciation: [maʁɛʃe]) is a station on Line 9 of the Paris Métro in the 20th arrondissement. Located under the Rue d'Avron, it is named after the nearby Rue des Maraîchers. It in turn took its name from the market gardens "maraîchers" once located there; until the 20th century, the hills of Belleville and Montreuil were cultivated by many market-gardeners whose most famous product were the peaches from Montreuil.

== History ==
The station opened on 10 December 1933 as part of the line's extension from between Richelieu–Drouot to Porte de Montreuil. It offered a out-of-station connection to the Gare de la rue d'Avron on the Petite Ceinture railway until its subsequent closure to passenger traffic a few months later on 23 July 1934.

As part of the "Un métro + beau" programme by the RATP, the station's corridors and platforms were renovated and modernised on 12 December 2006.

In 2019, the station was used by 2,608,017 passengers, making it the 199th busiest of the Métro network out of 302 stations.

In 2020, the station was used by 1,316,167 passengers amidst the COVID-19 pandemic, making it the 198th busiest of the Métro network out of 304 stations.

In 2021, the station was used by 1,994,064 passengers, making it the 179th busiest of the Métro network out of 304 stations.

== Passenger services ==
=== Access ===
The station has 3 accesses:

- Access 1: rue des Pyrénées
- Access 2: rue des Maraîchers
- Access 3: rue d'Avron

=== Station layout ===
Street Level
B1	Mezzanine
Platform level	Side platform, doors will open on the right
Platform level	Westbound	← toward Pont de Sèvres (Buzenval)
Platform level	Eastbound	toward Mairie de Montreuil (Porte de Montreuil) →
Platform level	Side platform, doors will open on the right

=== Platform ===
The station has a standard configuration with 2 tracks surrounded by 2 side platforms. Like the neightbouring Buzenval station, the lower part of the platform walls are vertical instead of the usual elliptical shape. This is due to the narrow width of the road the station is situated under, only 18 m wide.

=== Other connections ===
The station is also served by lines 26, 57, and 64 of the RATP bus network.

== Nearby ==
- Chapelle Saint-Charles de la Croix-Saint-Simon
- Jardin de la Gare de Charonne
- Hopital de la Croix Saint-Simon
- Forner Petite Ceinture railway (section between rue du Volga and cours de Vincennes, known as “Bois de Charonne”)
- Square Sarah-Berhnardt

== Gallery ==
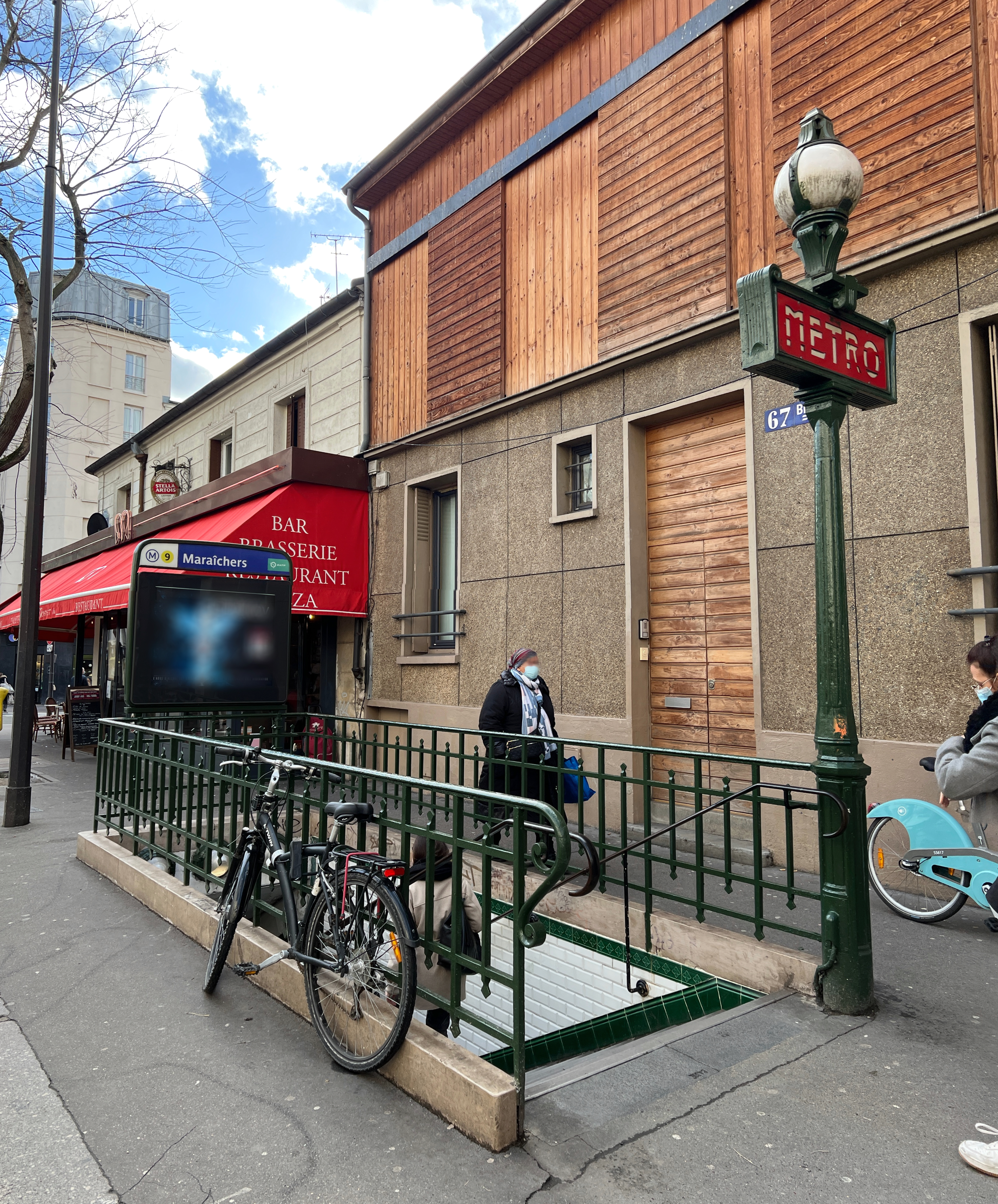
Access 1

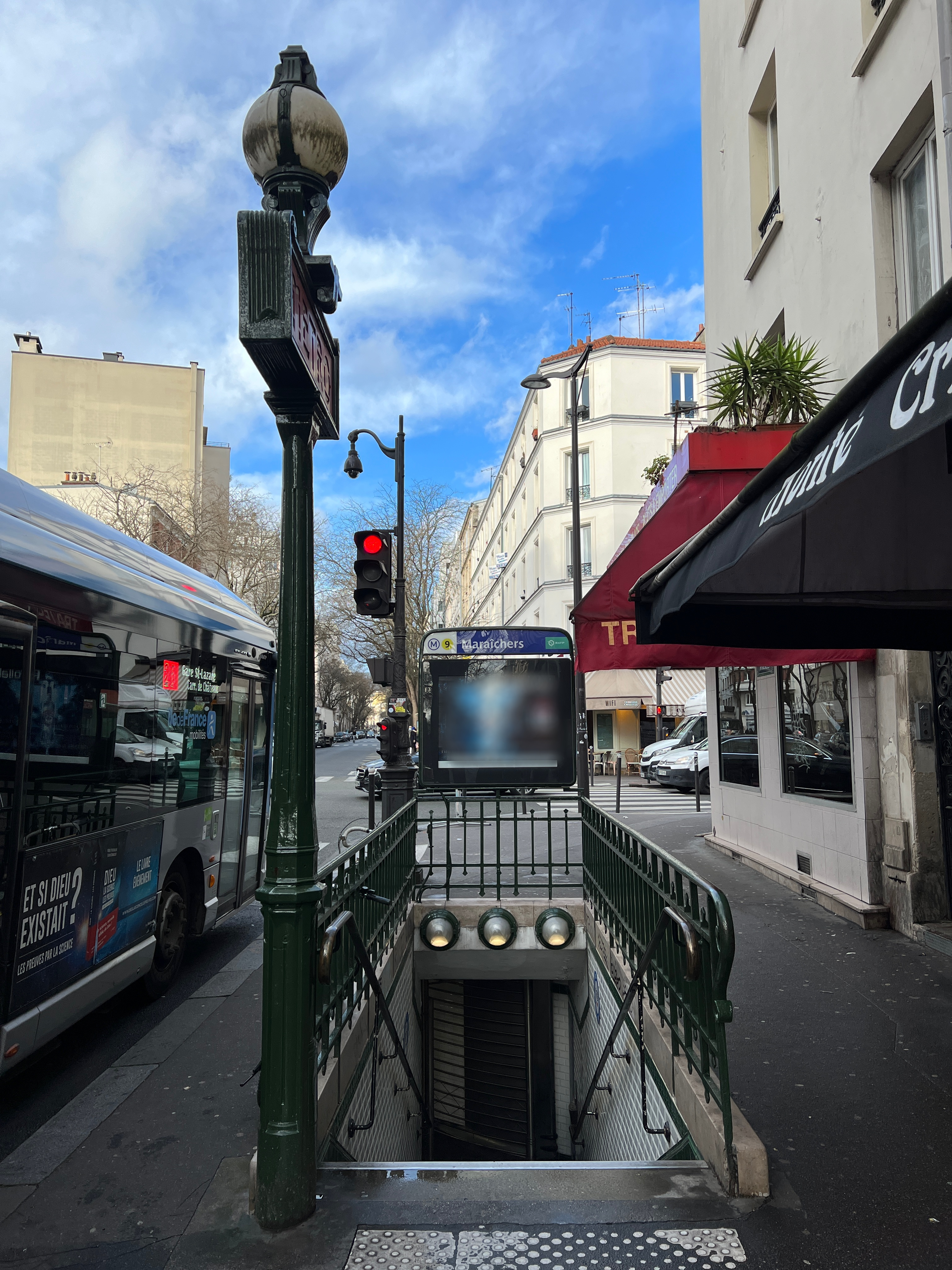
Access 2

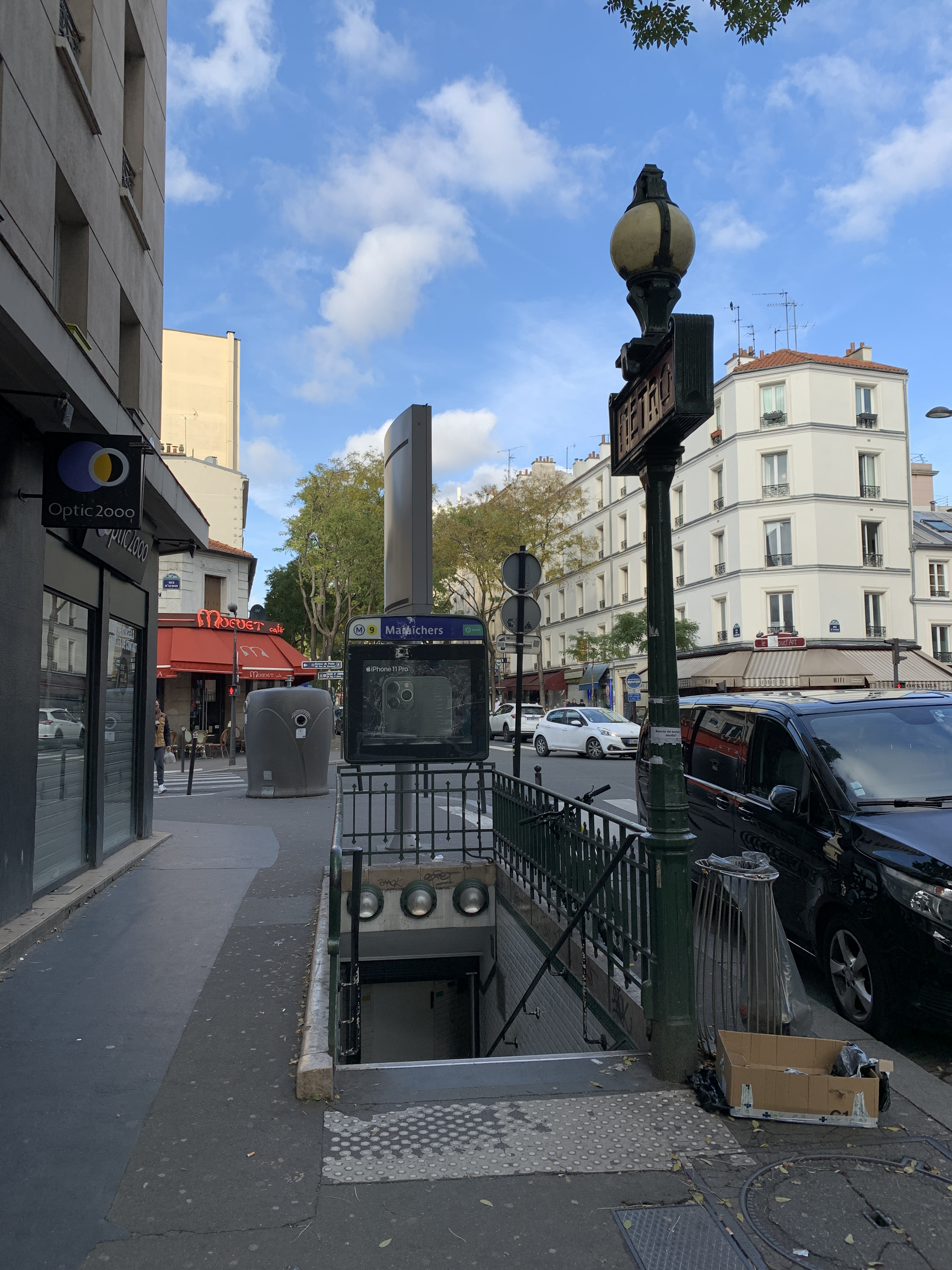
Access 3

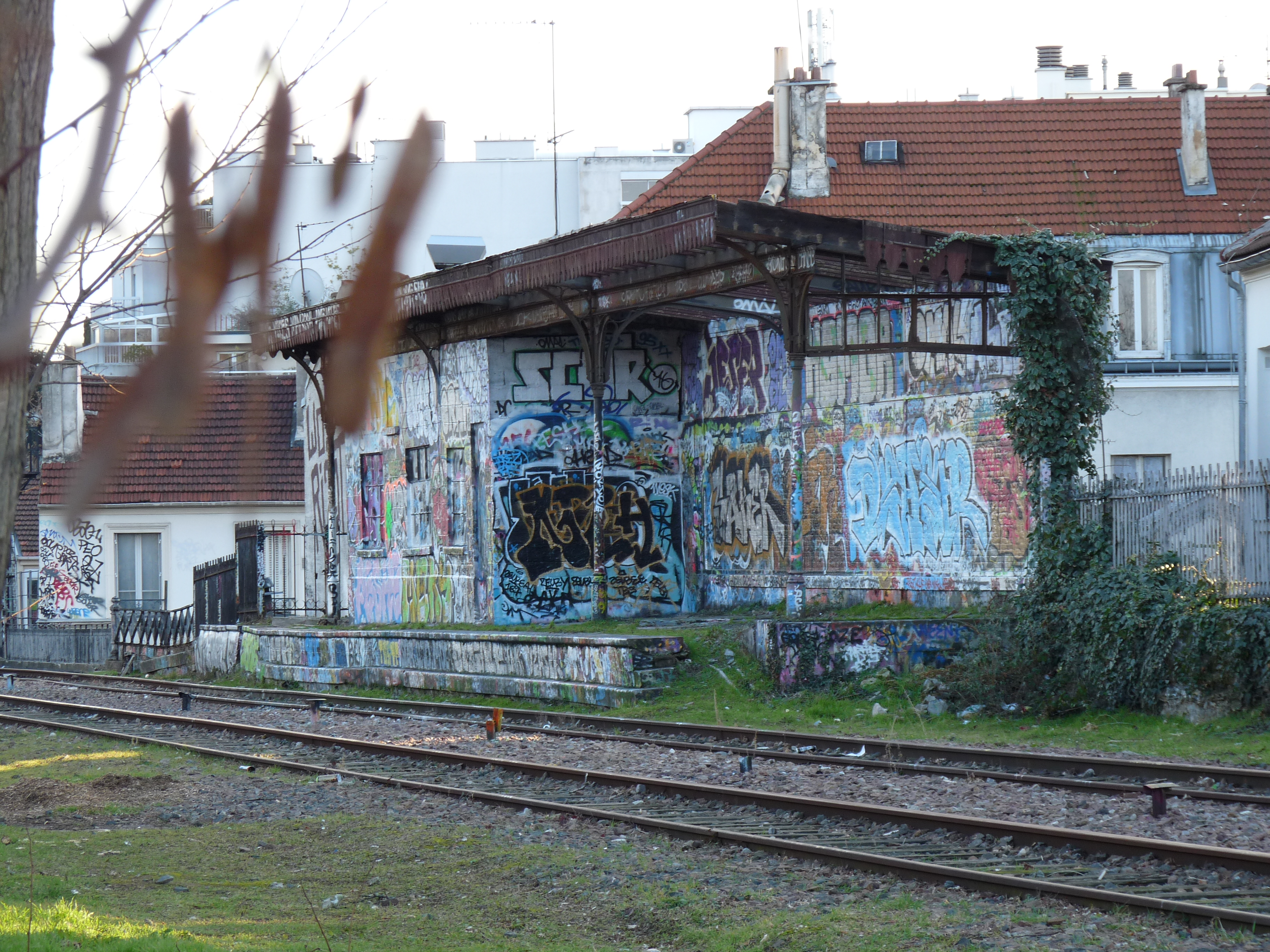
The former Gare de la rue d'Avron today
