= Croix de Chavaux station =

Metro station in Montreuil, France

Croix de Chavaux Place Jacques Duclos
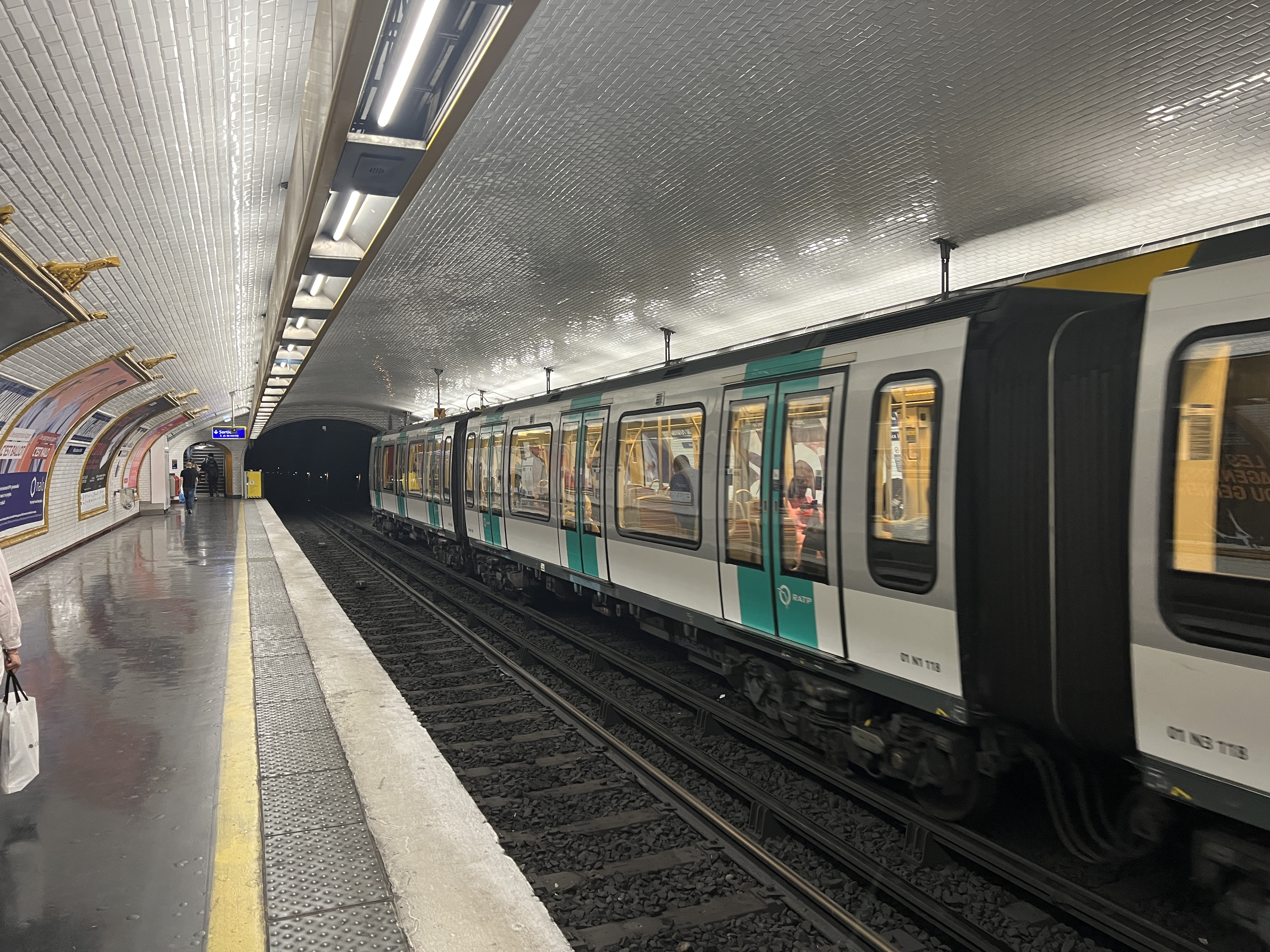
- Station view

General information
- Location: Montreuil, Seine-Saint-Denis; Île-de-France; France
- Coordinates: 48°51′29″N 2°26′09″E
- System: Paris Métro station
- Owner: RATP
- Operator: RATP
- Line: Paris Metro Paris Metro Line 9
- Platforms: 2 (side platforms)
- Tracks: 2

Other information
- Station code: 25-02
- Fare zone: 1

History
- Opened: 14 October 1937

Passengers
- 2,839,564 (2020)

Services
Preceding station	Paris Metro	Following station
Robespierre towards Pont de Sèvres	Line 9	Mairie de Montreuil Terminus
Location
- Location within Paris

Croix de Chavaux (French pronunciation: [kʁwa d(ə) ʃavo]) is a station on Line 9 of the Paris Métro, at the Croix de Chavaux crossroads in the suburb of Montreuil.

== Name origin ==
The "chavaux" in the name of the crossroads is probably a corruption of the French "chevaux" ("horses"). The "croix" (French for "cross") may be a reference to the crossroads or to a wayside cross.

== History ==
The station was opened on 14 October 1937 with the extension of the line from Porte de Montreuil to Mairie de Montreuil.

In 2019, the station was used by 4,954,717 passengers, making it the 85th busiest of the Métro network out of 302 stations.

In 2020, the station was used by 2,839,564 passengers amidst the COVID-19 pandemic, making it the 60th busiest of the Métro network out of 305 stations.

== Passenger services ==
=== Access ===
The station has 5 accesses:

- Access 1: Place Jacques-Duclos
- Access 2: rue de Paris
- Access 3: Boulevard Chanzy – Center commercial
- Access 4: rue Kléber – Office du Tourisme
- Access 5: Place du Marché

=== Station layout ===
Street Level
B1	Mezzanine
Line 9 platforms	Side platform, doors will open on the right
Line 9 platforms	Westbound	← toward Pont de Sèvres (Robespierre)
Line 9 platforms	Eastbound	toward Mairie de Montreuil (Terminus) →
Line 9 platforms	Side platform, doors will open on the right

=== Platforms ===
The station has a standard configuration with two tracks surrounded by two 105-metre-long platforms and the vault is elliptical. The decoration is in the yellow Andreu-Motte style but only the two light canopies remain. White bevelled ceramic tiles cover the walls, vault, and tunnel exits. The advertising frames are made of honey-coloured earthenware and the name of the station is also made of earthenware in the style of the original CMP. The subtitle, on the other hand, is inscribed in Parisine font on enamelled plates of reduced dimensions. The yellow seats are in the Akiko.

=== Other connections ===
The station is also served by lines 102, 115, 122, and 127 of the RATP bus network, and at night, by lines N16 and N34 of the Noctilien bus network.

== Gallery ==
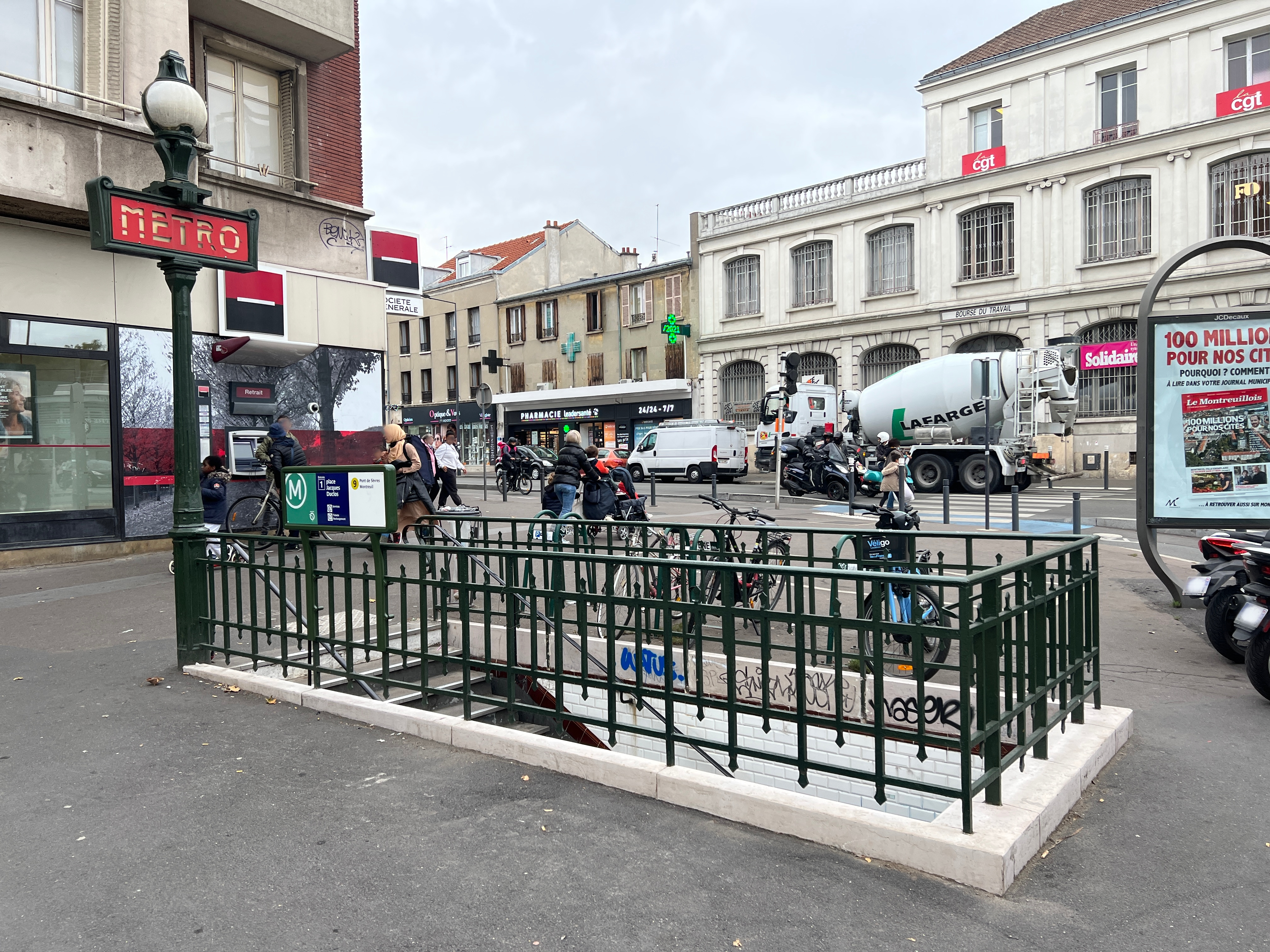
Entrance 1

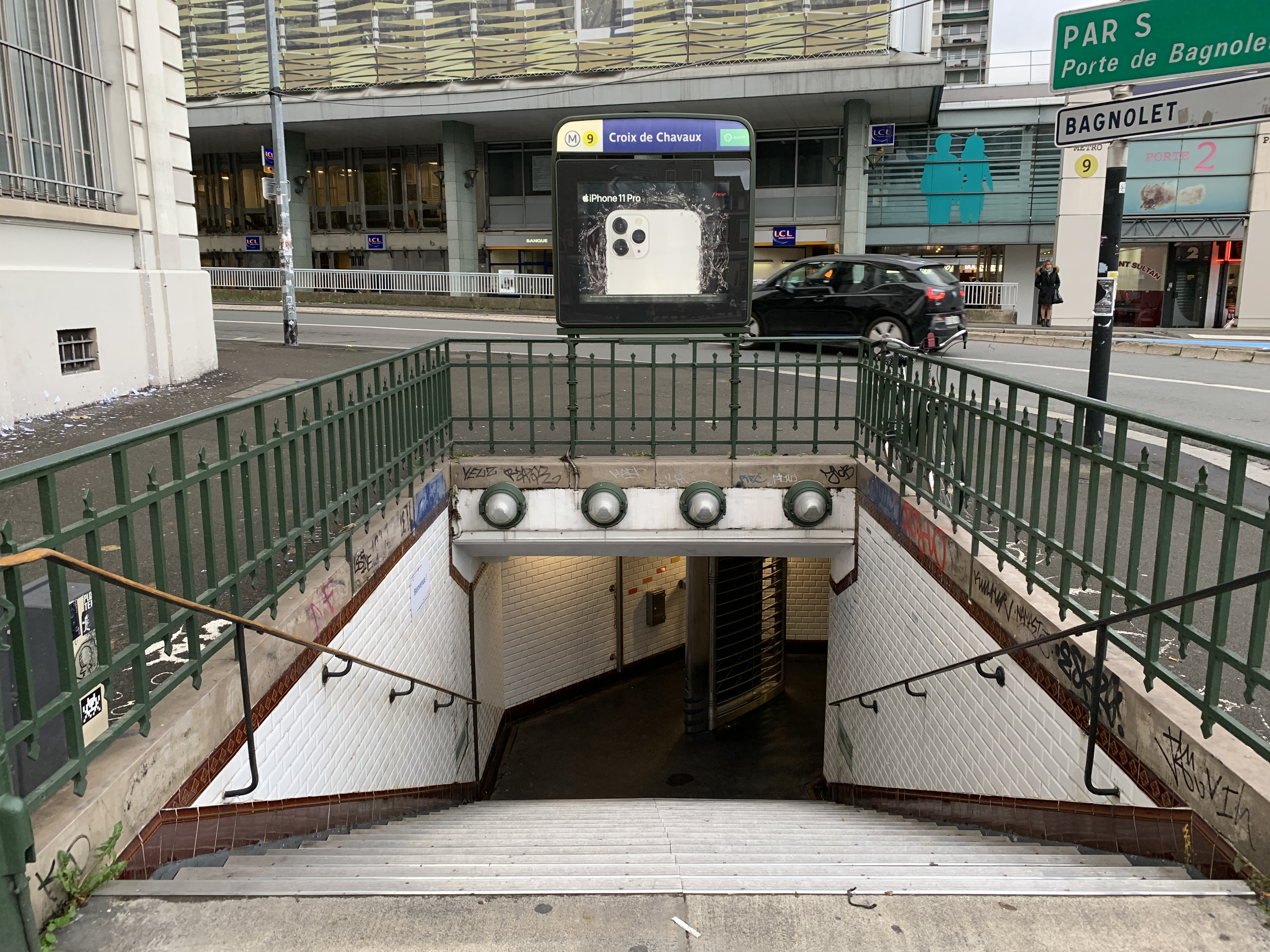
Entrance 2

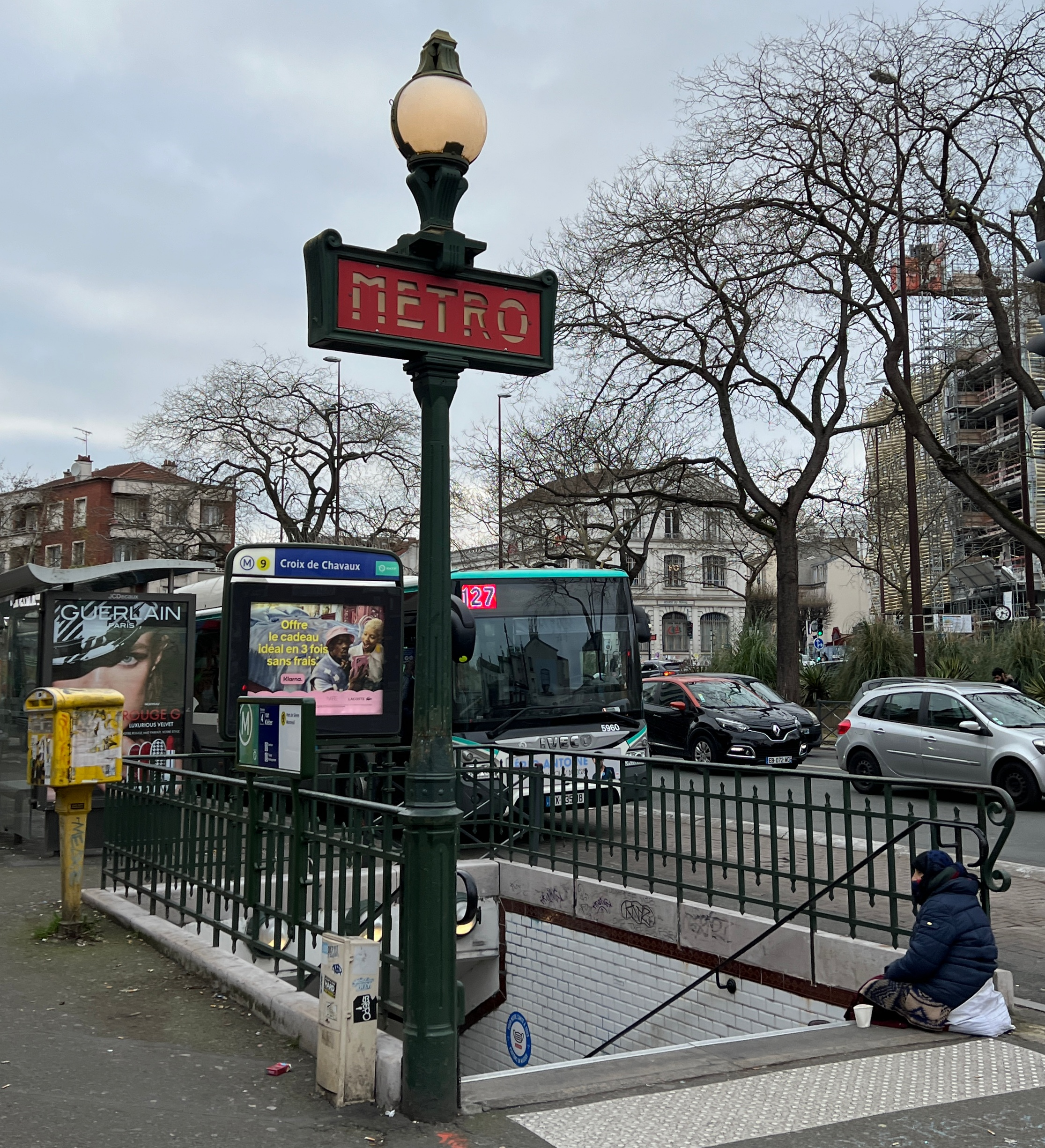
Entrance 4

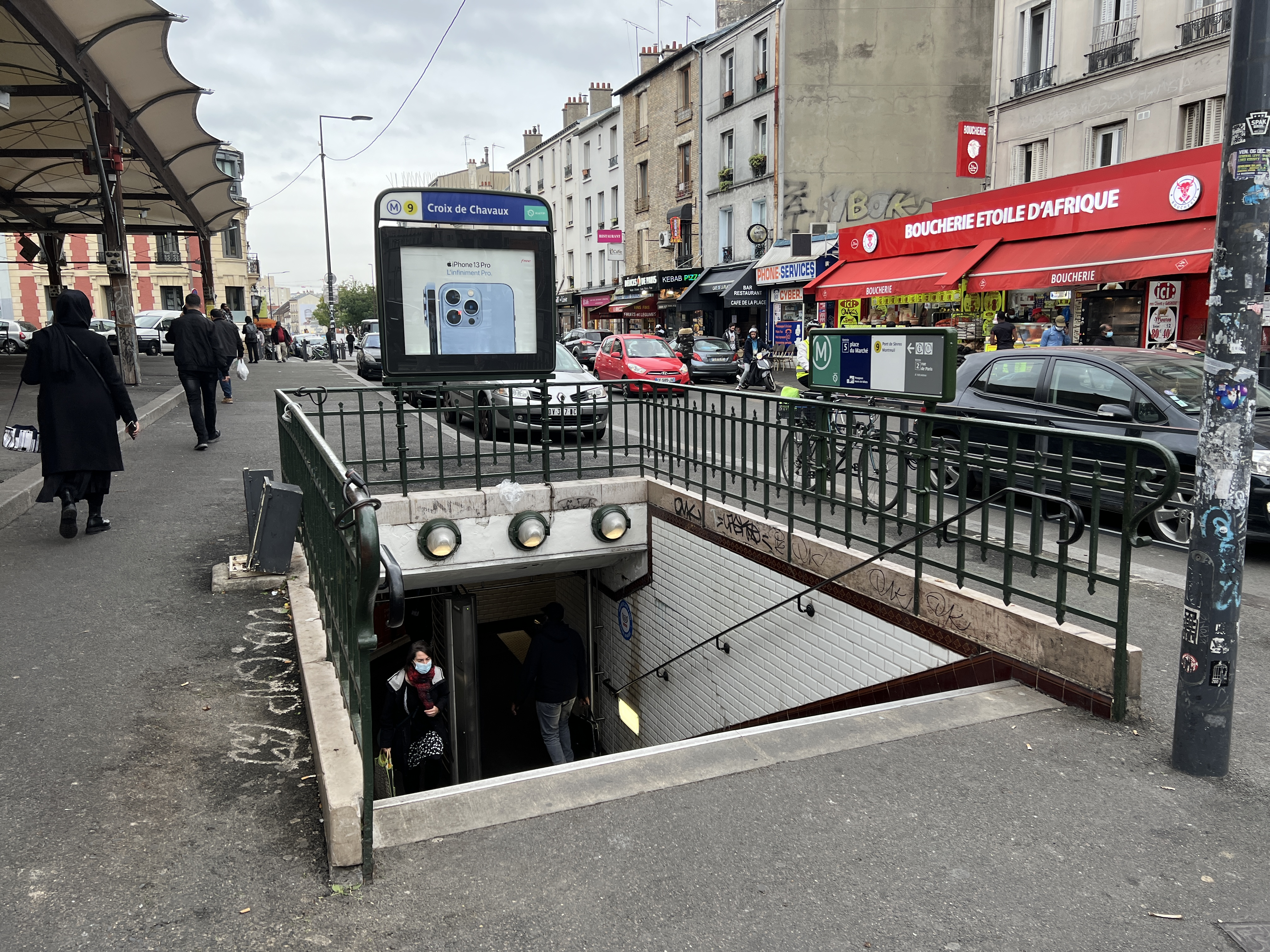
Entrance 5

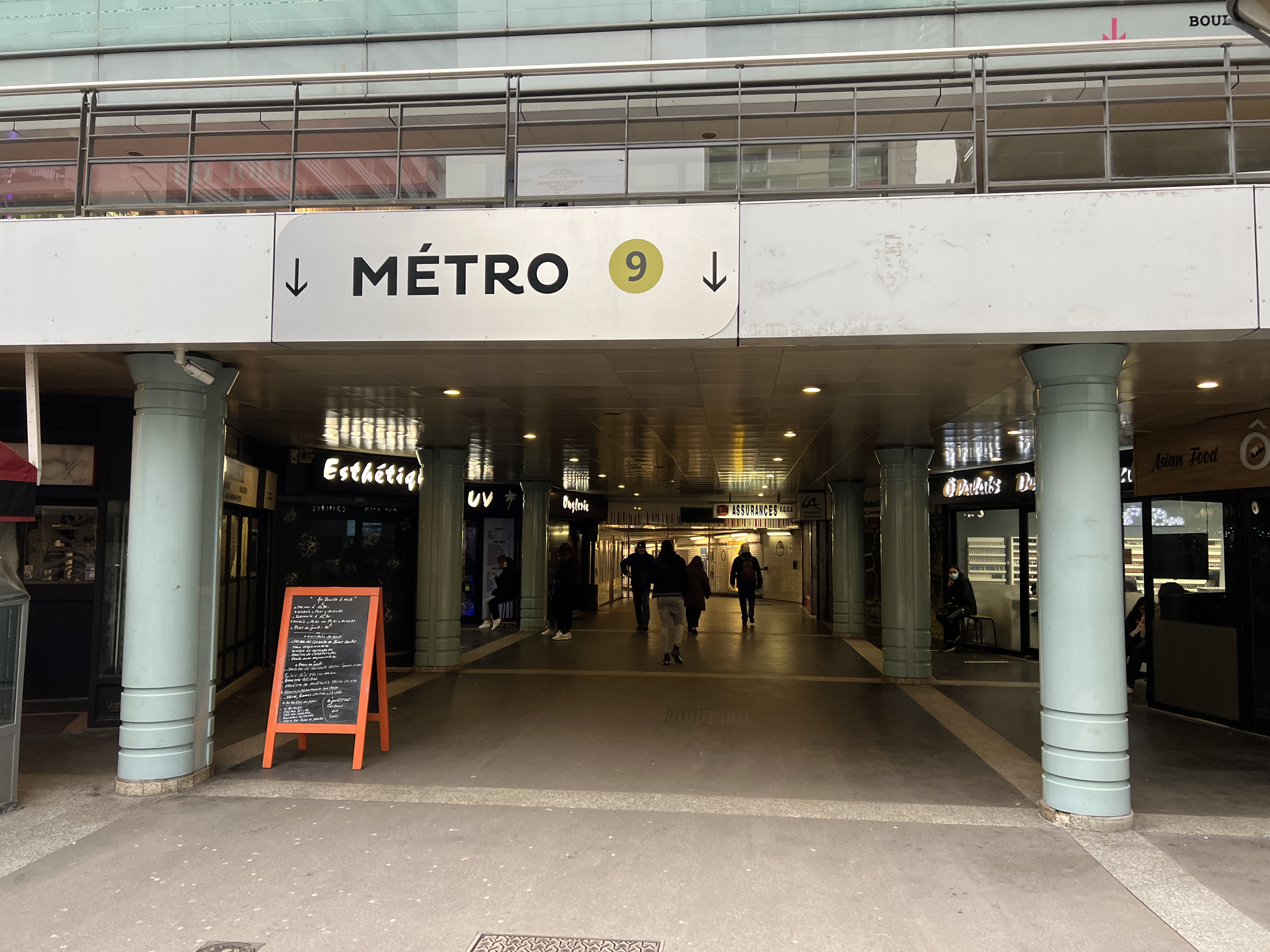
