= Porte de Montreuil station =

Metro station in Paris, France

Porte de Montreuil
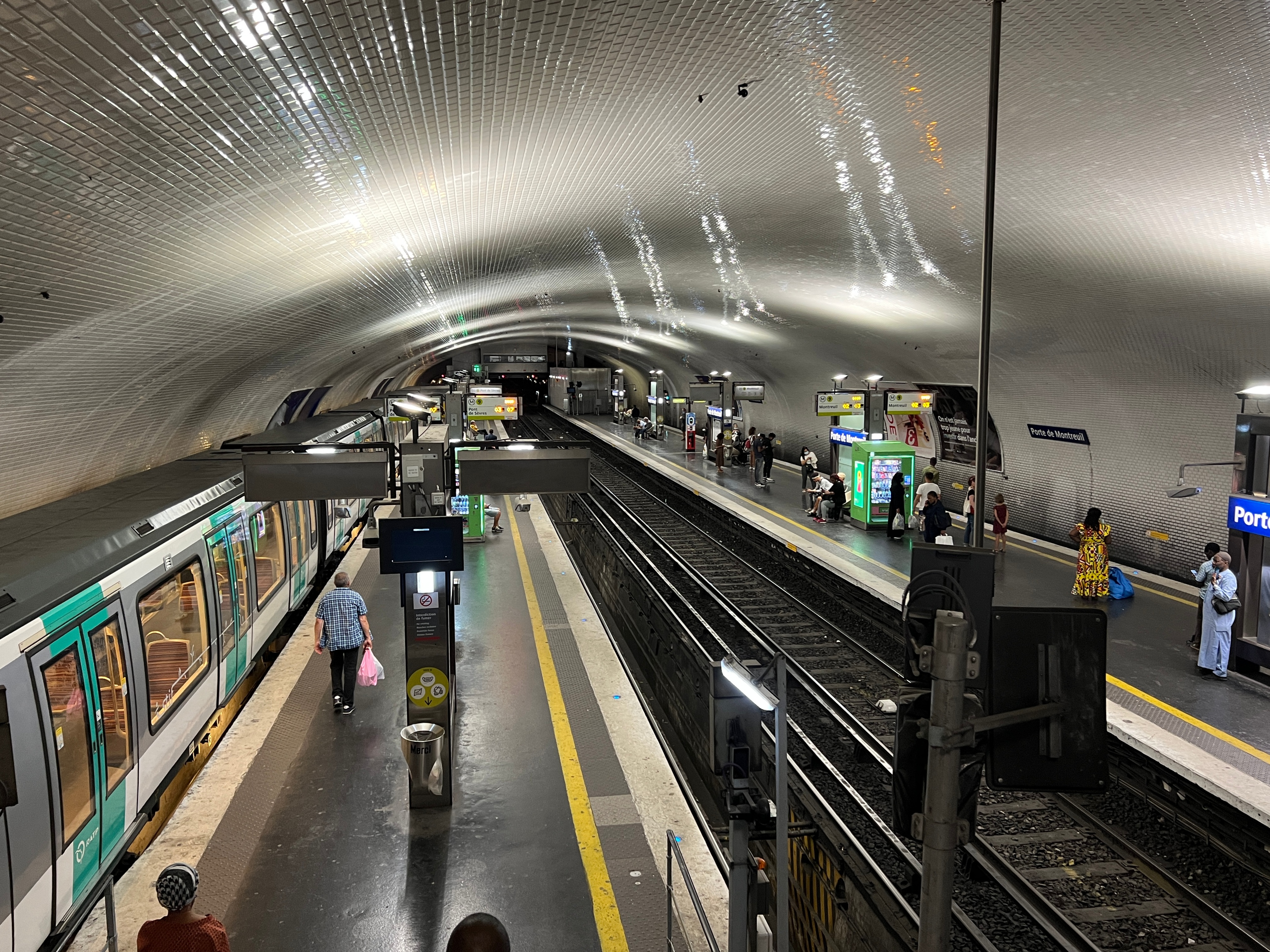
- Porte de Montreuil station in 2022

General information
- Location: 20th arrondissement of Paris; Île-de-France; France
- Coordinates: 48°51′14″N 2°24′44″E
- System: Paris Métro station
- Owner: RATP
- Operator: RATP
- Line: Paris Metro Paris Metro Line 9
- Platforms: 2 (island platforms)
- Tracks: 4
- Connections: Tramways in Île-de-France Île-de-France tramway Line 3b

Construction
- Accessible: no

Other information
- Station code: 05-03
- Fare zone: 1

History
- Opened: 10 December 1933

Passengers
- 3,067,413 (2021)

Services
Preceding station	Paris Metro	Following station
Maraîchers towards Pont de Sèvres	Line 9	Robespierre towards Mairie de Montreuil
Preceding station	Tram	Following station
Marie de Miribel towards Porte Dauphine	T3b	Porte de Vincennes Terminus
Location
- Location within Paris

Porte de Montreuil (French pronunciation: [pɔʁt də mɔ̃tʁœj]; lit. 'Gate of Montreuil') is a station on line 9 of the Paris Métro in the 20th arrondissement.

It is named after the Porte de Montreuil, one of the former city gates in the 19th-century Thiers wall of Paris, which led to the town of Montreuil. Flea markets are held on the glacis (the sloping bank in front of a wall) of the former fortifications.

== History ==
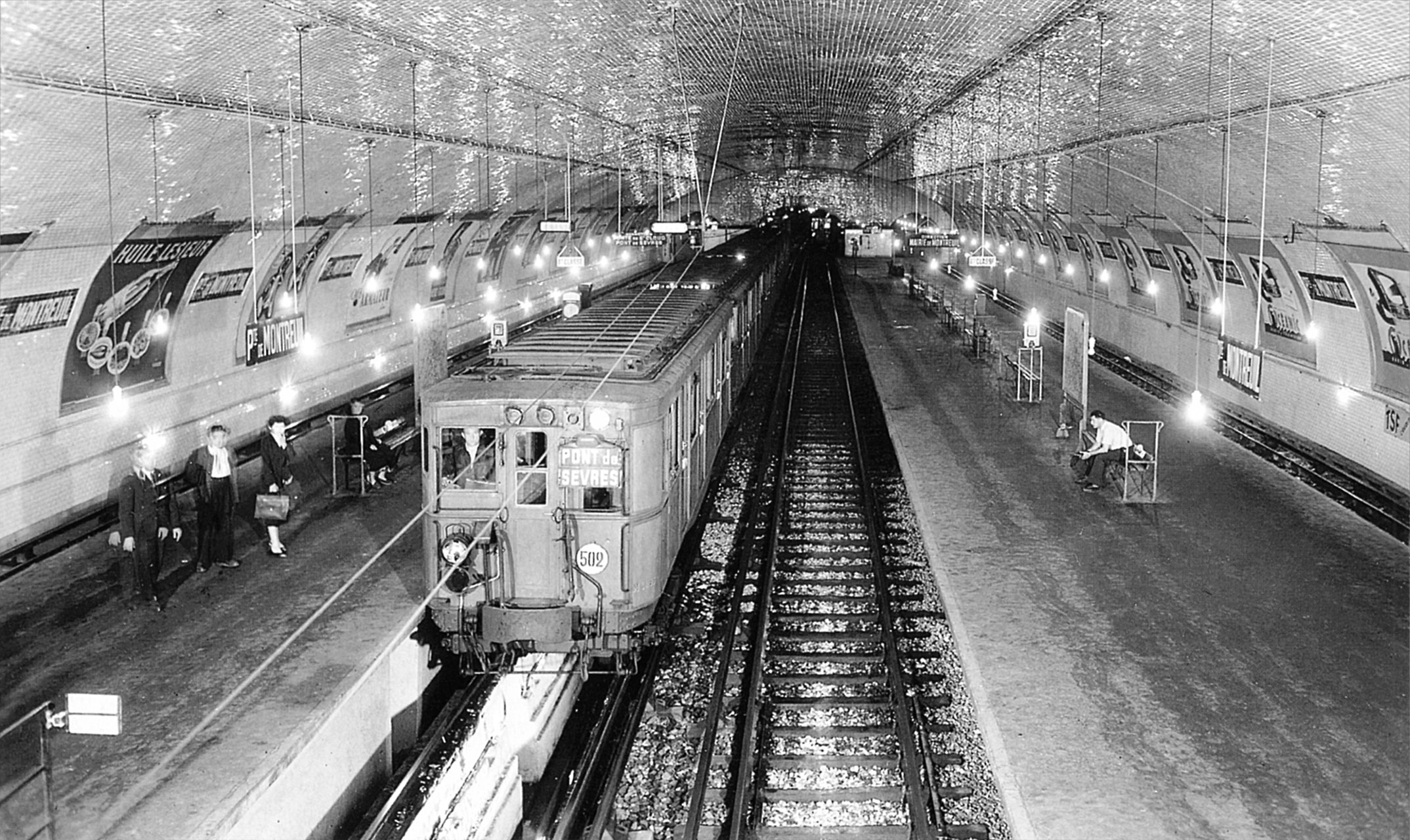
The platforms in the 1930s

The station opened on 10 December 1933 as part of the line's extension from between Richelieu–Drouot, serving as its eastern terminus until the line's further extension to Mairie de Montreuil on 14 October 1937.

In 2019, the station was used by 4,344,016 passengers, making it the 104th busiest of the Métro network out of 302 stations.

In 2020, the station was used by 2,383,093 passengers amidst the COVID-19 pandemic, making it the 93rd busiest of the Métro network out of 304 stations.

In 2021, the station was used by 3,067,413 passengers, making it the 103rd busiest of the Métro network out of 304 stations.

== Passenger services ==
=== Access ===
The station has four accesses:

- Access 1: avenue de la Porte de Montreuil (with an ascending escalator)
- Access 2: Boulevard Davout
- Access 3: rue d'Avron Hôpital de la Croix Saint-Simon
- Access 4: rue du Volga

=== Station layout ===
Street Level
B1	Mezzanine
Platforms	Westbound	← toward Pont de Sèvres (Maraîchers)
Platforms	Island platform, doors will open on the left, right
Platforms	Westbound	← toward Pont de Sèvres (Maraîchers)
Platforms	Eastbound	toward Mairie de Montreuil (Robespierre) →
Platforms	Island platform, doors will open on the right
Platforms	Eastbound	toward Mairie de Montreuil (Robespierre) →

=== Platforms ===
Due to the station having served as a former terminus, it has two island platforms flanked by two tracks each, with the eastbound platform being slightly wider. Unusually, both platforms are located a single wide vault that spans 22.5 m across, compared with other similar stations like Château de Vincennes on line 1 and Porte de la Villette on line 7 that have each island platform located under its own smaller vault.

It's vaulted ceiling is the largest on the métro network, consisting of 53,000 bevelled tiles covering a 6,000 m^{2} surface.

=== Other connections ===
==== Tramway ====
The station has been served by tramway line 3b since 15 December 2012 as part of its initial phase from Porte de Vincennes to Porte de la Chapelle.

==== Bus ====
The station is also served by lines 57, 202, 215, 351, and 501 (La Traverse de Charonne) of the RATP bus network.

== Gallery ==
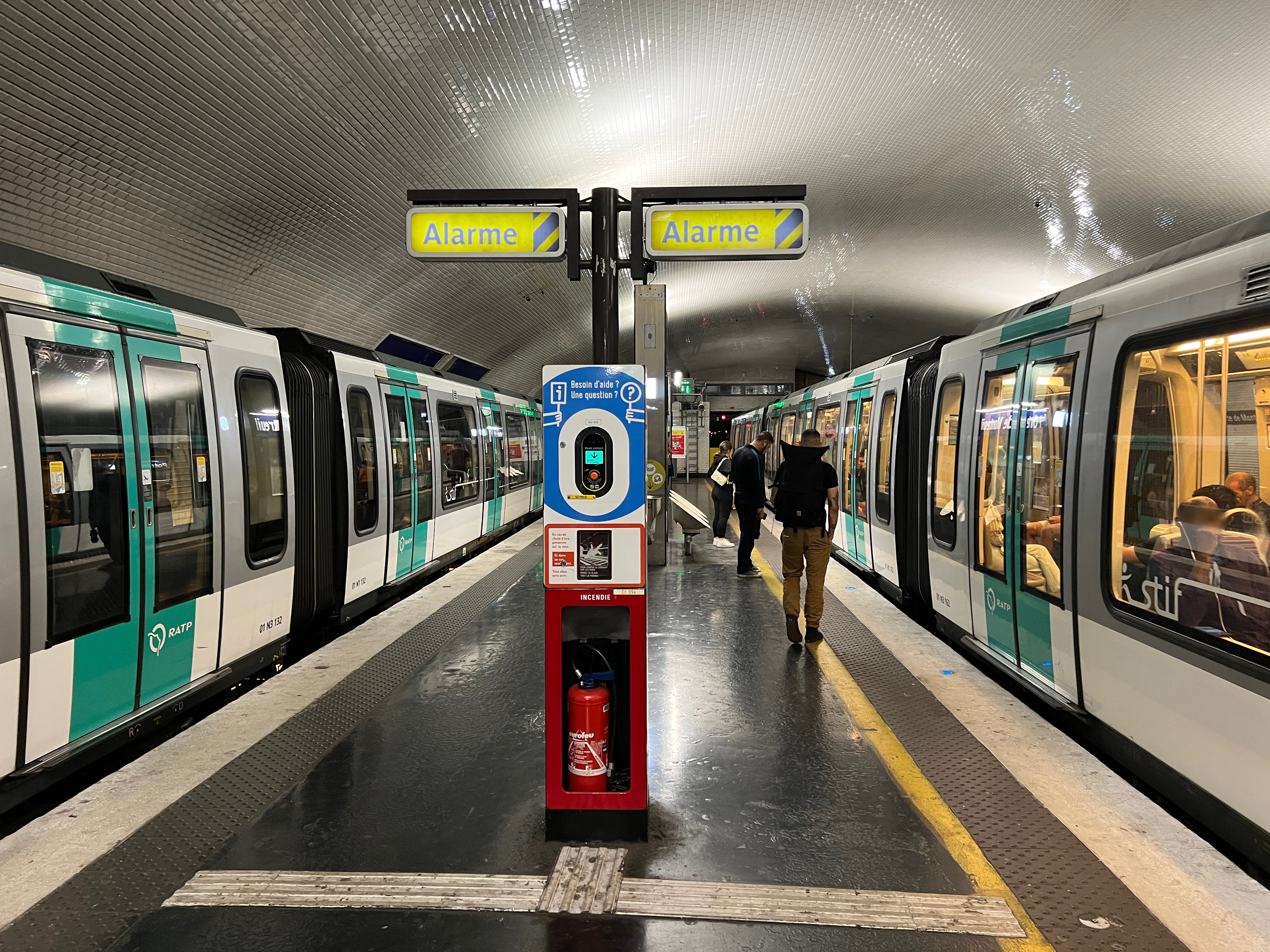
MF 01 at the station

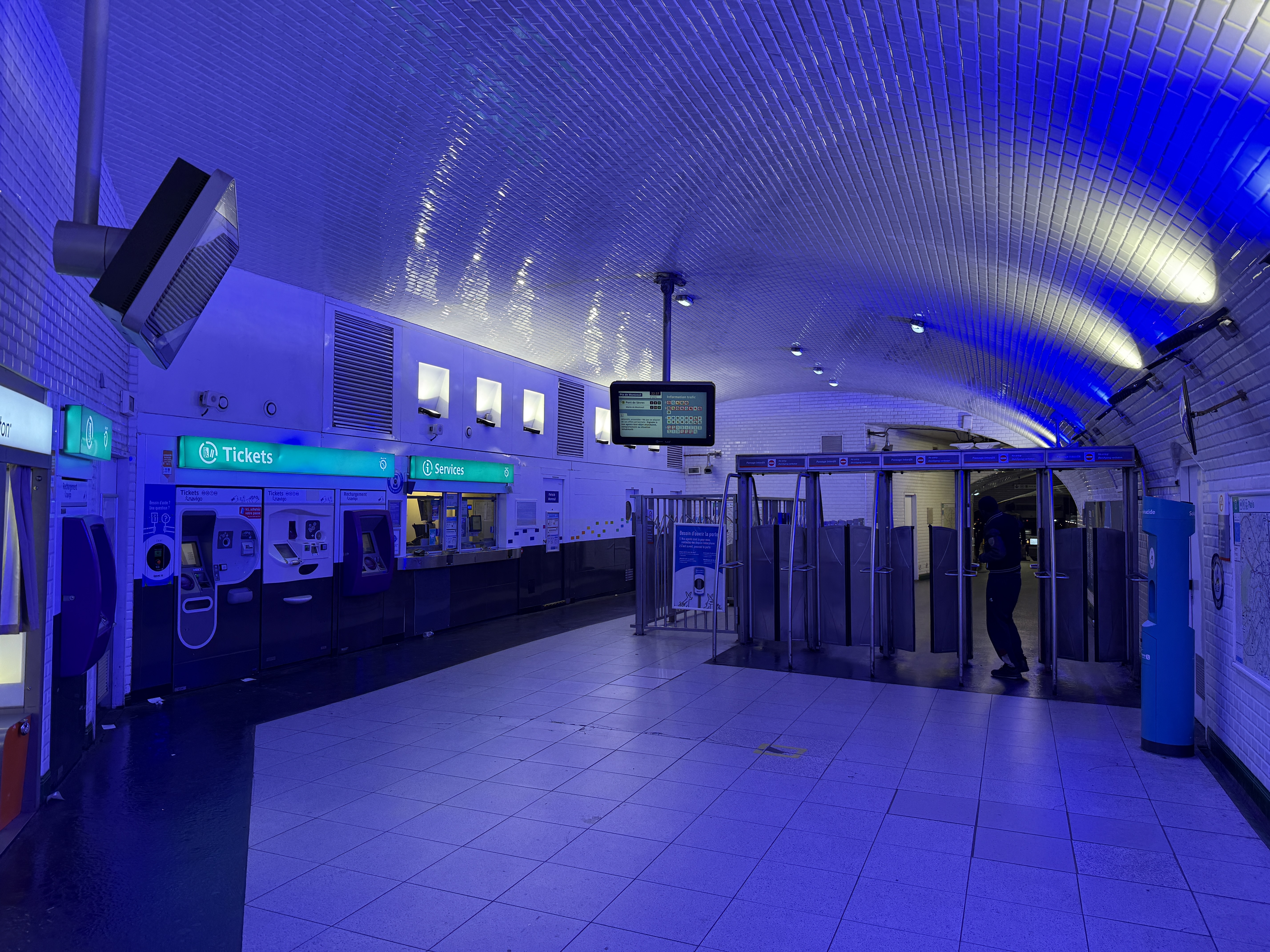
Mezzanine

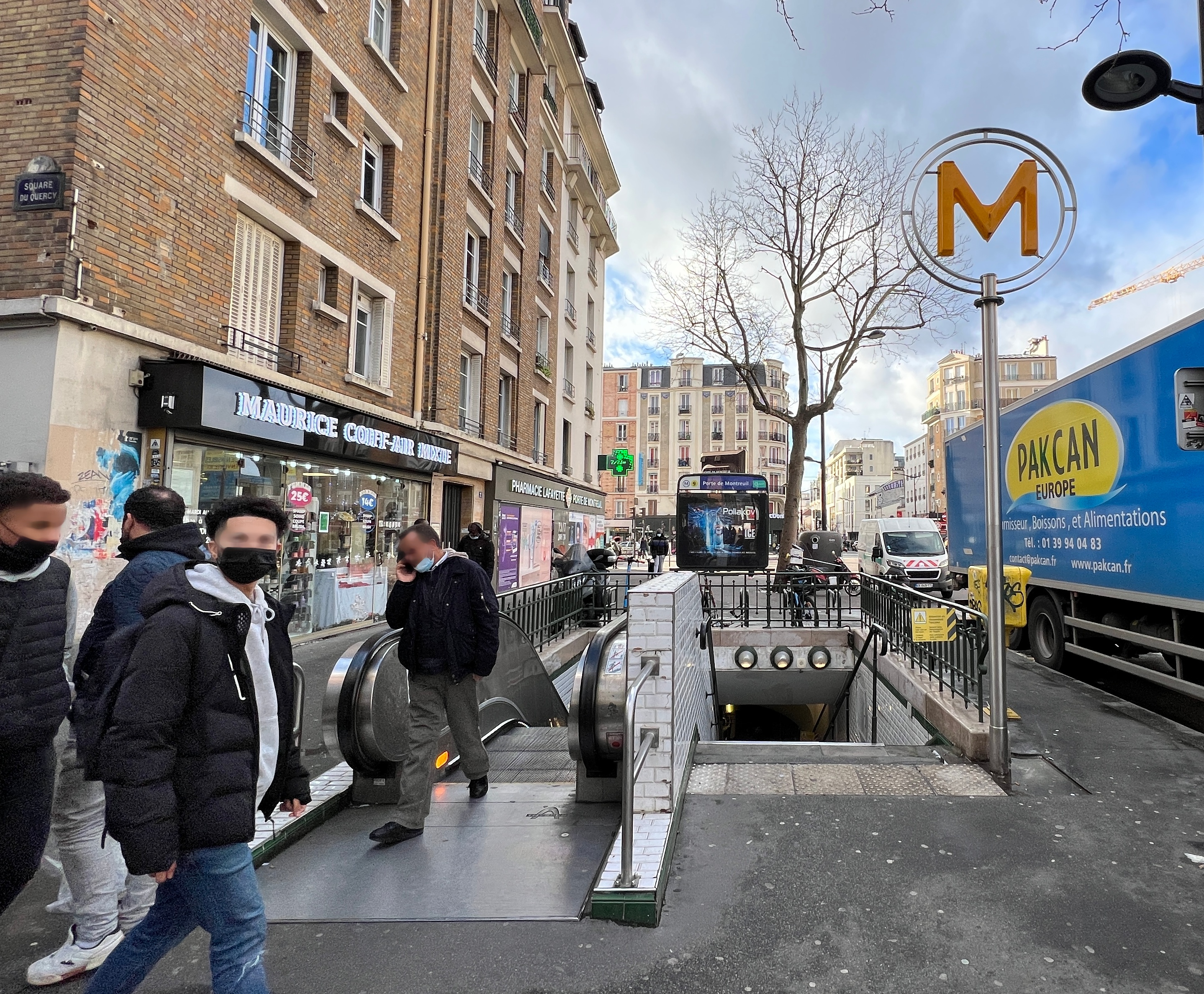
Access 1

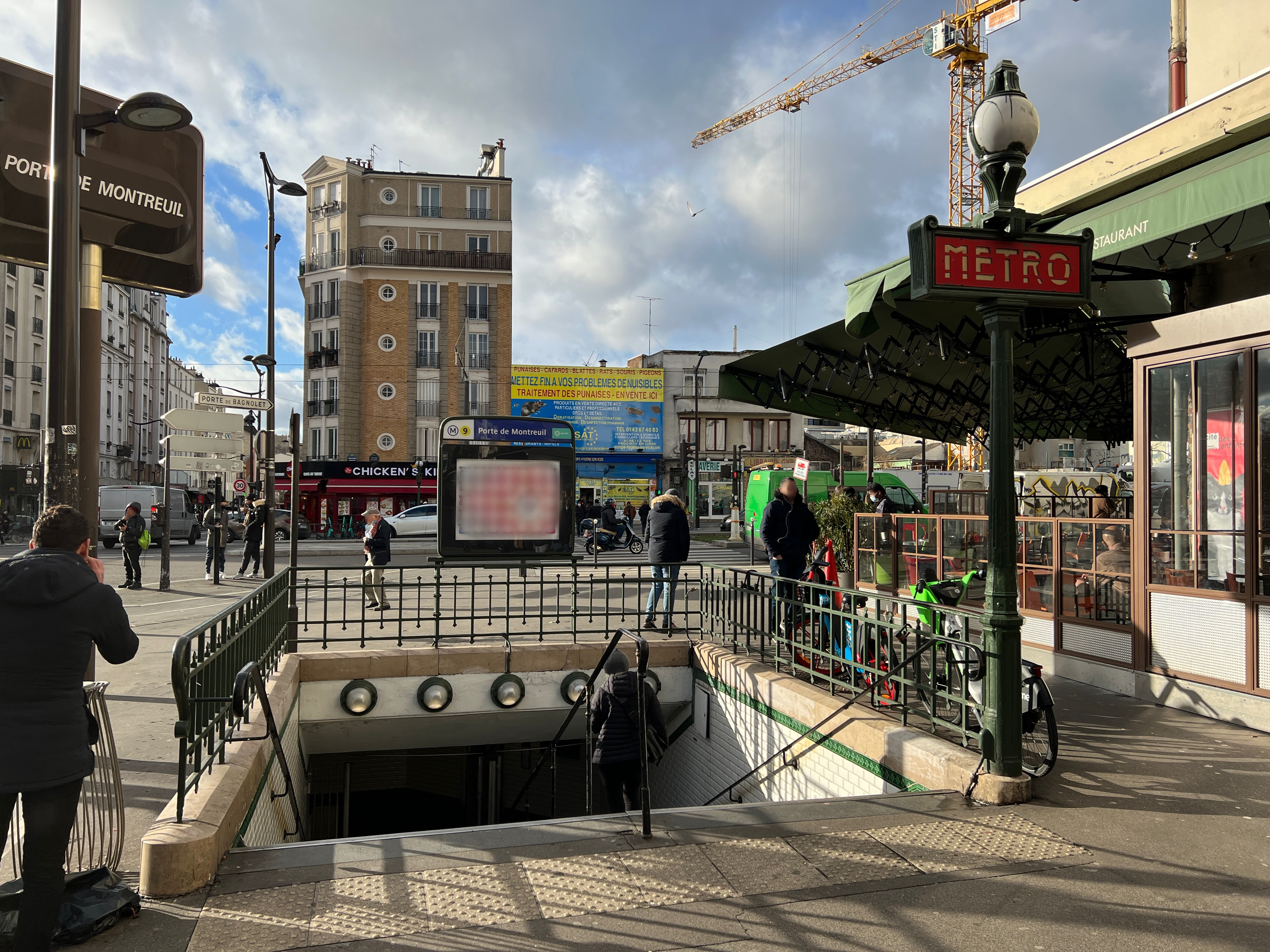
Access 2

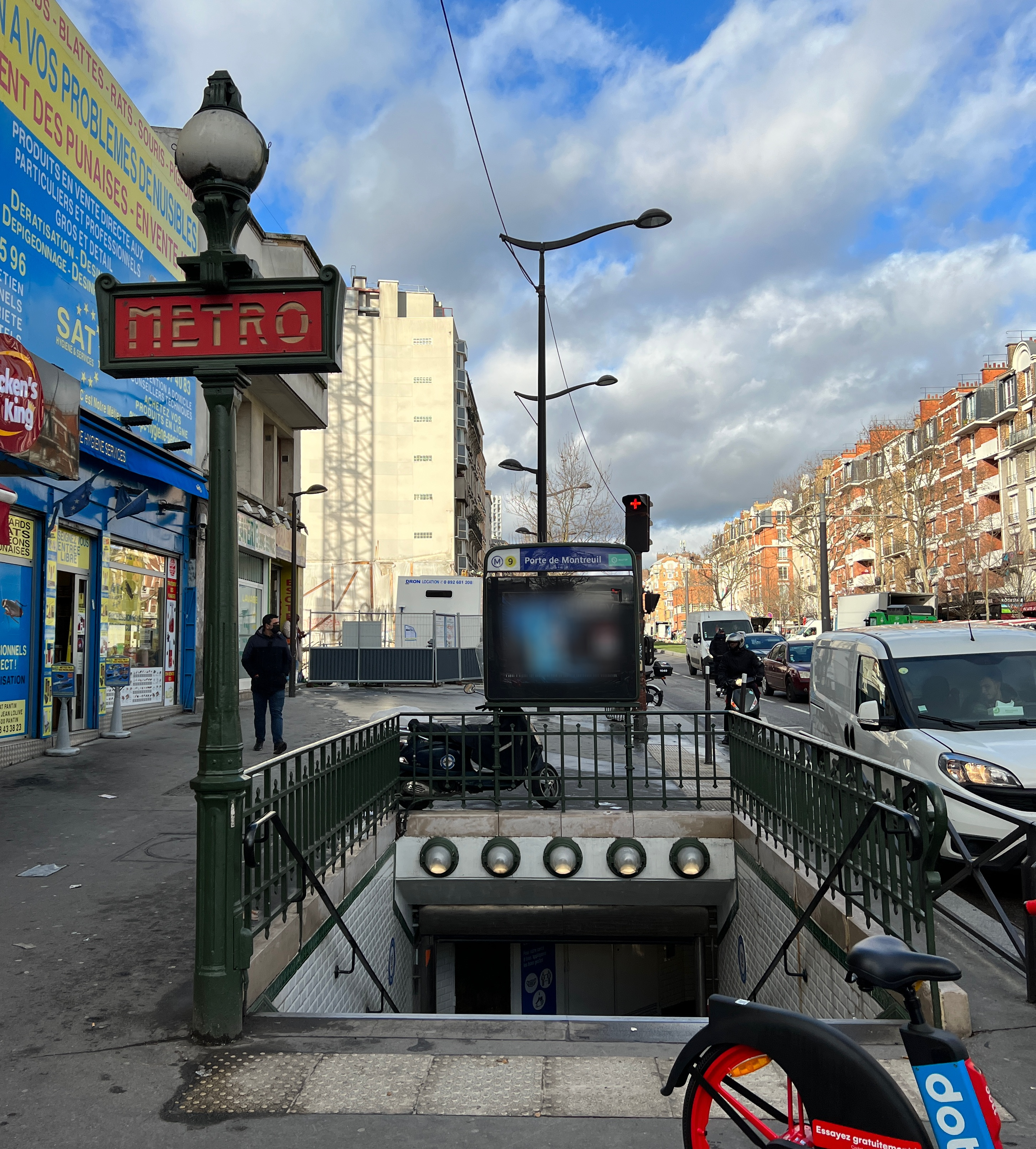
Access 3

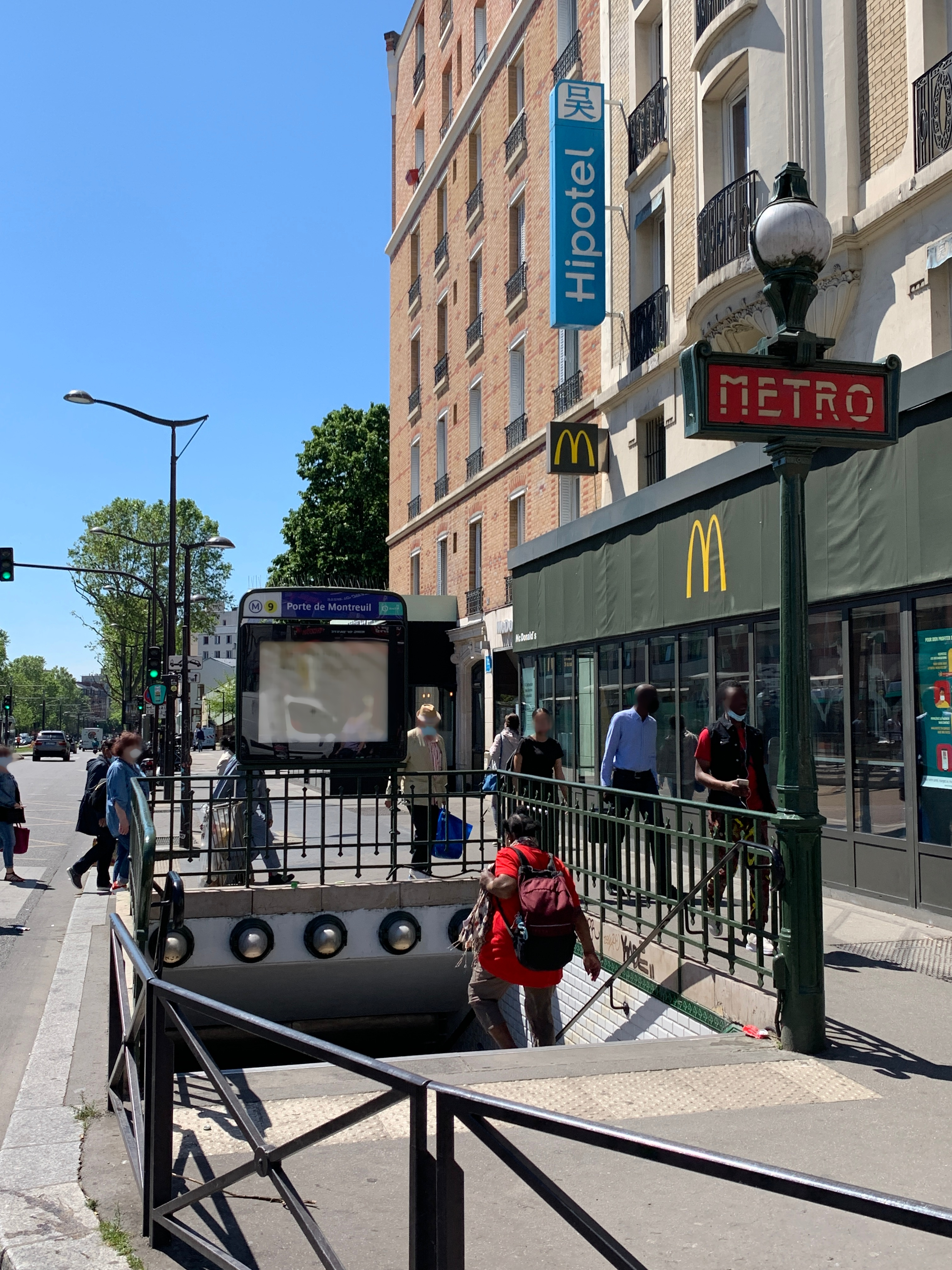
Access 4

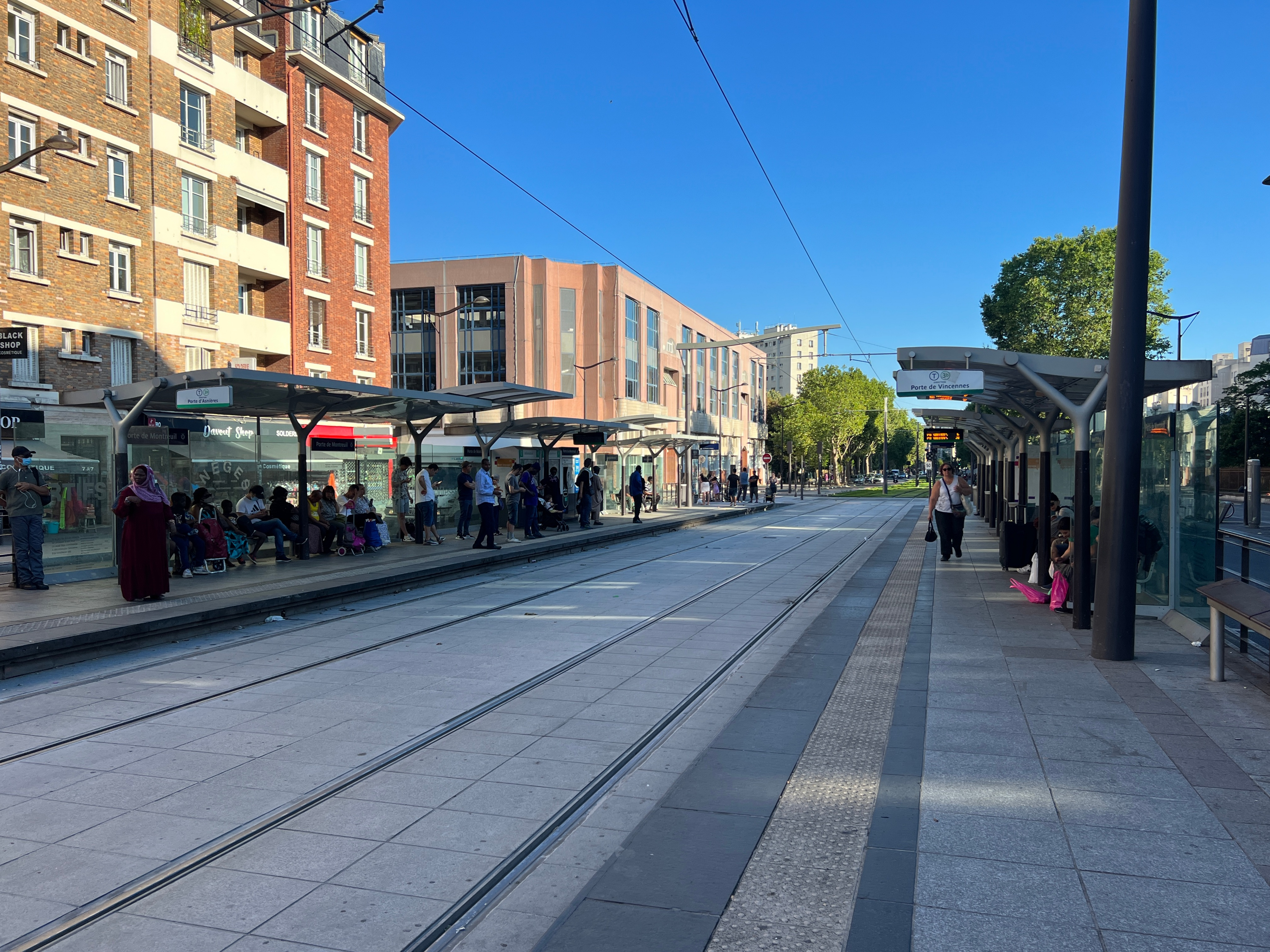
Tramway line T3b station
