= Mairie de Montreuil station =

Metro station in Montreuil, France

Mairie de Montreuil
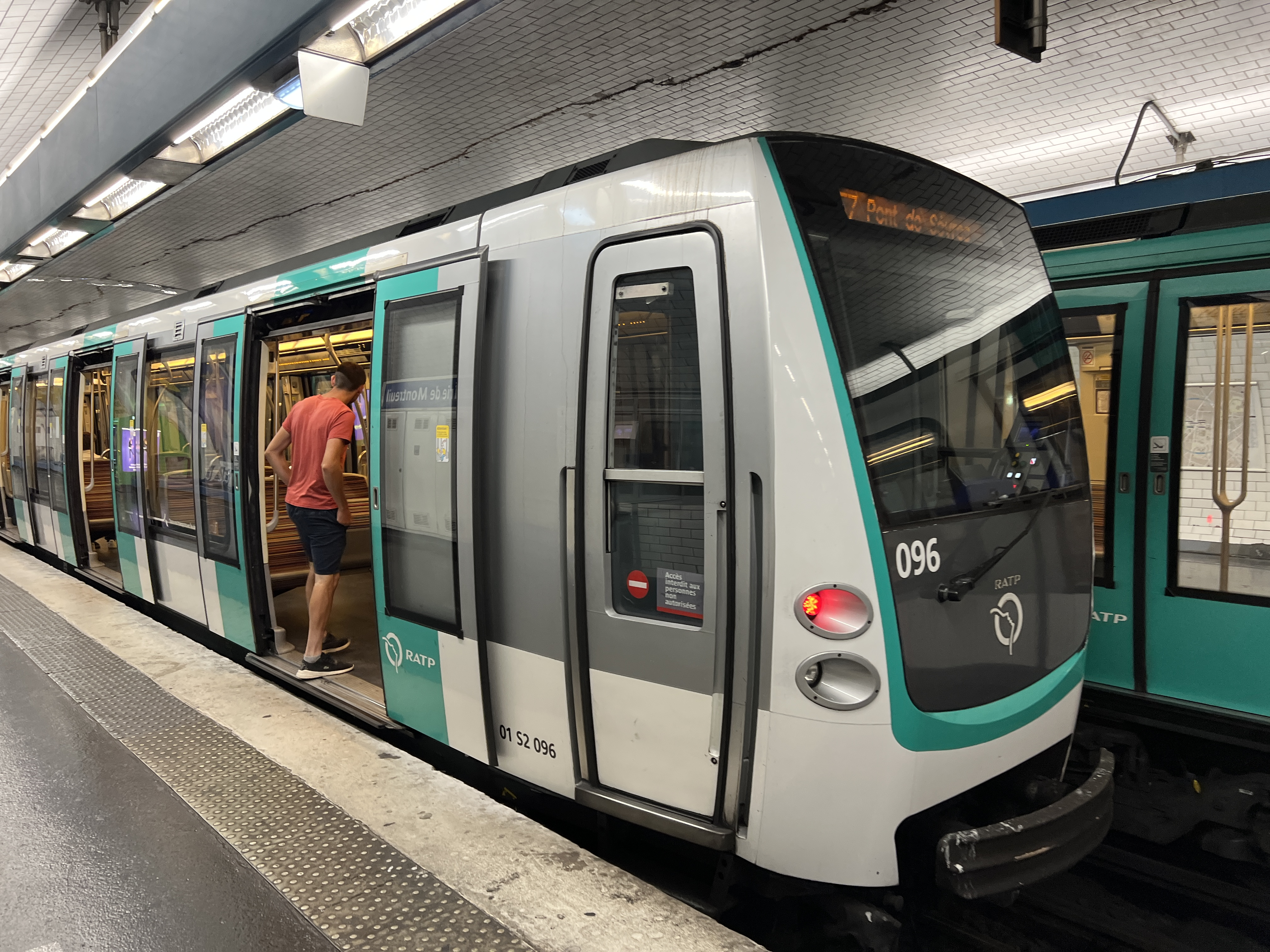
- MF 01 at Mairie de Montreuil

General information
- Location: Montreuil, Seine-Saint-Denis; Île-de-France; France
- Coordinates: 48°51′44″N 2°26′31″E
- System: Paris Métro station
- Owner: RATP
- Operator: RATP
- Line: Paris Metro Paris Metro Line 9
- Platforms: 2 (side platforms)
- Tracks: 2

Other information
- Station code: 25-03
- Fare zone: 1

History
- Opened: 14 October 1937

Passengers
- 4,764,601 (2020)

Services
Preceding station	Paris Metro	Following station
Croix de Chavaux towards Pont de Sèvres	Line 9	Terminus
Location
- Location within Paris

Mairie de Montreuil (French pronunciation: [mɛʁi d(ə) mɔ̃tʁœj]) is a station on Line 9 of the Paris Métro and its eastern terminus in the suburb of Montreuil. It is named after the nearby Mairie de Montreuil (Montreuil town hall).

== History ==
The station opened on 14 October 1937 with the extension of the line from Porte de Montreuil and serves as the eastern terminus of line 9.

In 2019, the station was used by 8,106,589 passengers, making it the 27th busiest of the Métro network out of 302 stations.

In 2020, the station was used by 4,764,601 passengers amidst the COVID-19 pandemic, making it the 18th busiest of the Métro network out of 305 stations.

== Passenger services ==
=== Access ===
The station has 5 accesses:

- Access 1: Square Jean-Jaurès
- Access 2: avenue Walwein
- Access 3: Boulevard Rouget-de-Lisle
- Access 4: avenue Pasteur
- Access 5: Boulevard Paul-Vaillant-Couturier

=== Station layout ===
Street Level
B1	Mezzanine
Line 9 platforms	Side platform, doors will open on the right
Line 9 platforms	Westbound	← toward Pont de Sèvres (Croix de Chavaux)
Line 9 platforms	Eastbound	Alighting passengers only →
Line 9 platforms	Side platform, doors will open on the right

=== Platforms ===
The station has a standard configuration with two tracks surrounded by two side platforms, and the vault is elliptical. The decoration is in the Andreu-Motte style with two blue light canopies, benches (on the platform towards Pont de Sèvres only) and corridor outlets treated in flat white tiles and blue Motte seats (on the departure platform only). These fittings are combined with the flat white ceramic tiles that cover the walls, the vault, and the tunnel exits. The advertising frames are metal, and the name of the station is inscribed in Parisine font on enamelled plaques.

On the north tunnel exit of the embarkation platform, a mosaic is painted on Sèvres porcelain tiles, dated 1937, depicting a map of the city with images of the main monuments.

=== Other connections ===
The station is also served by lines 102, 115, 121, 122, 129, and 322 of the RATP bus network, and at night, by lines N16 and N34 of the Noctilien bus network.

== Gallery ==
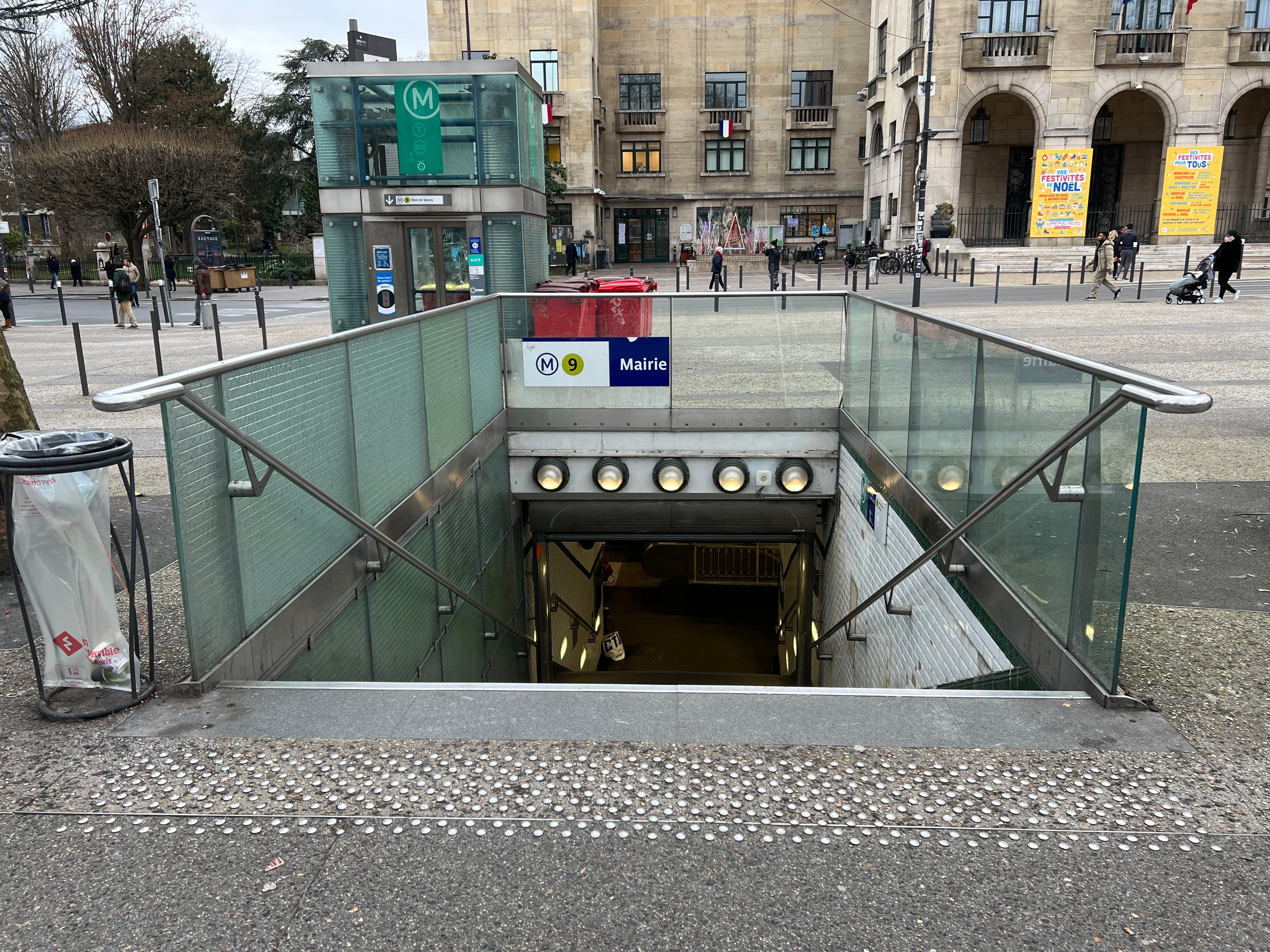
Access 1

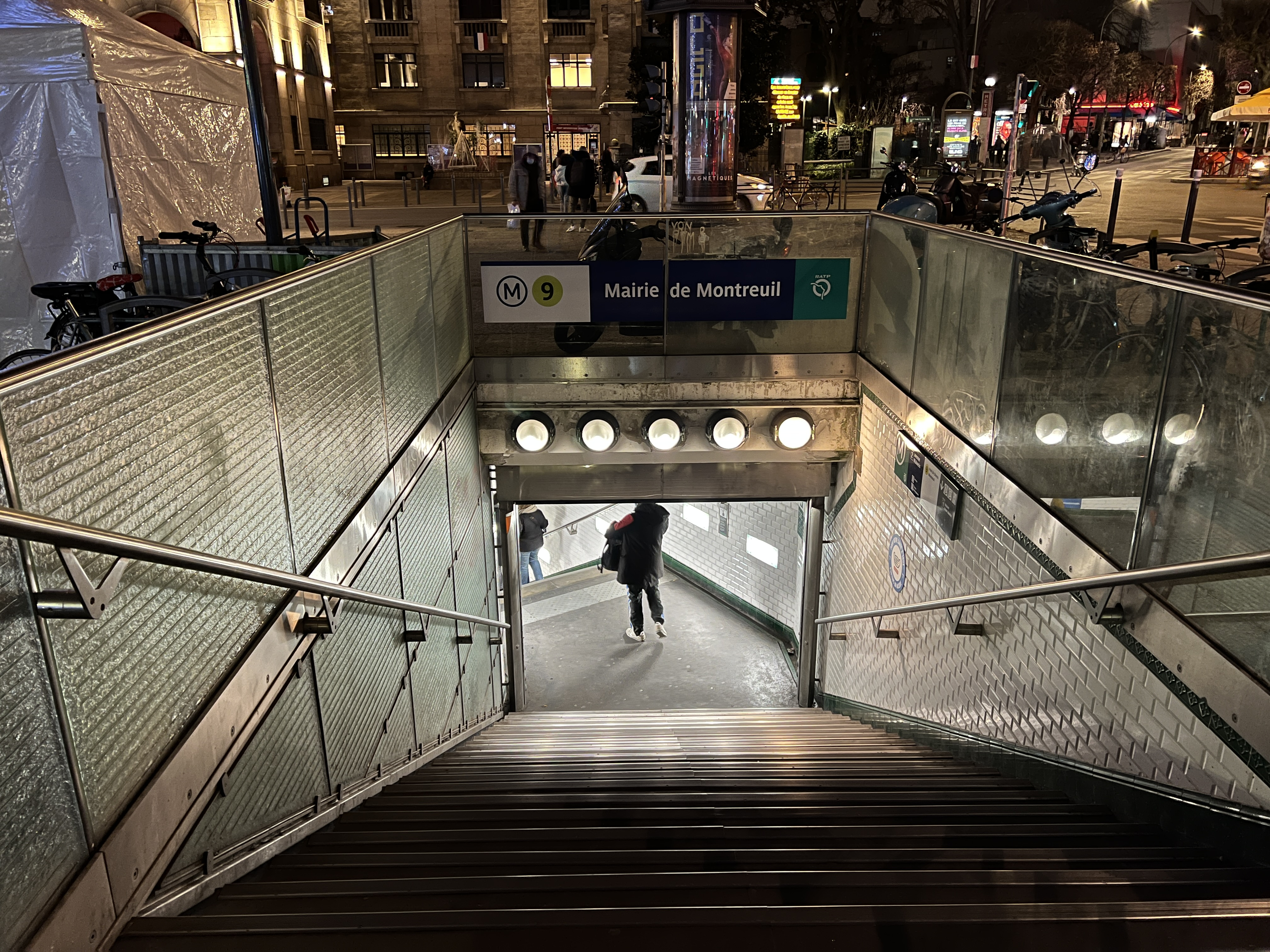
Access 2

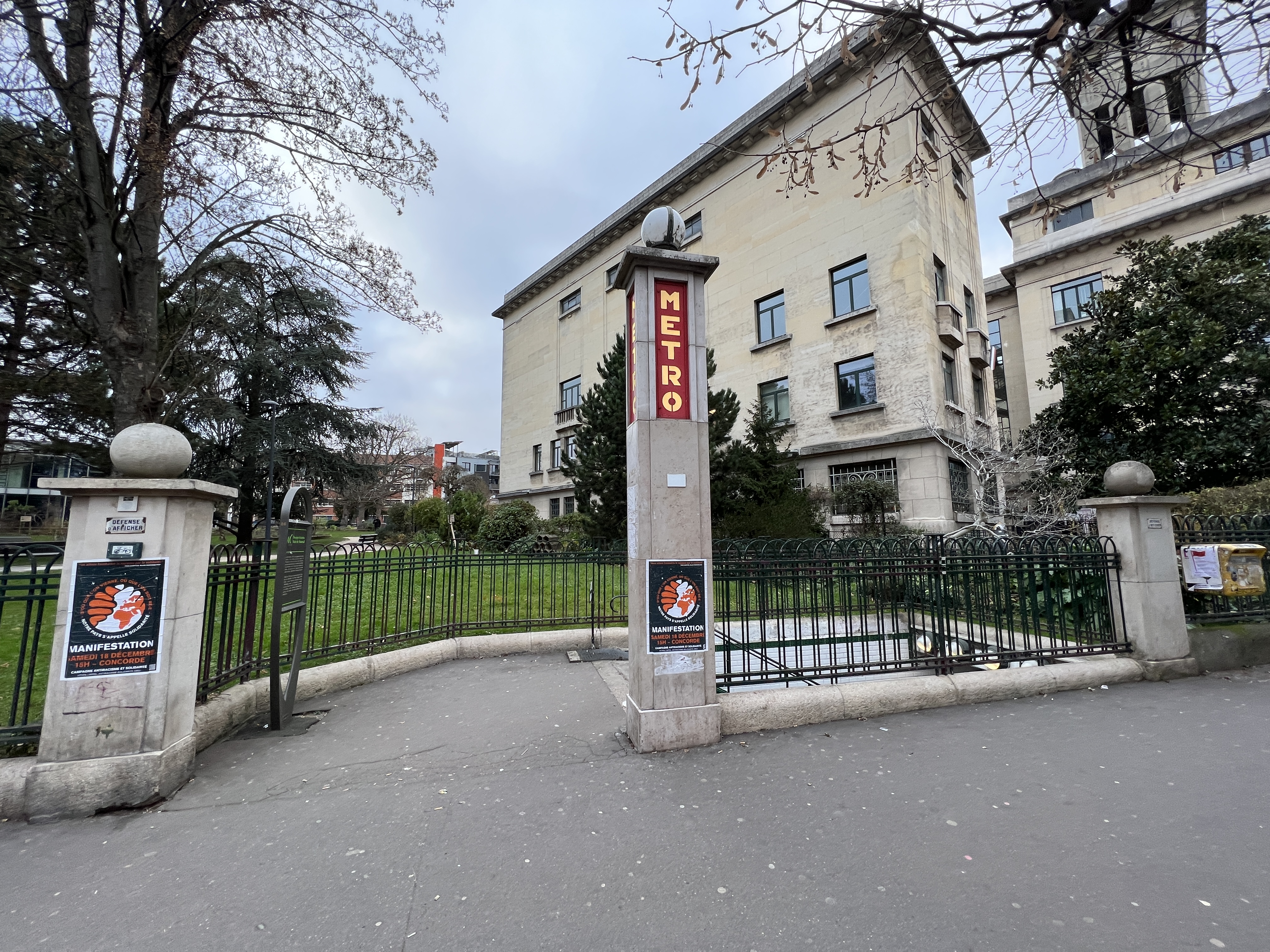
Access 3

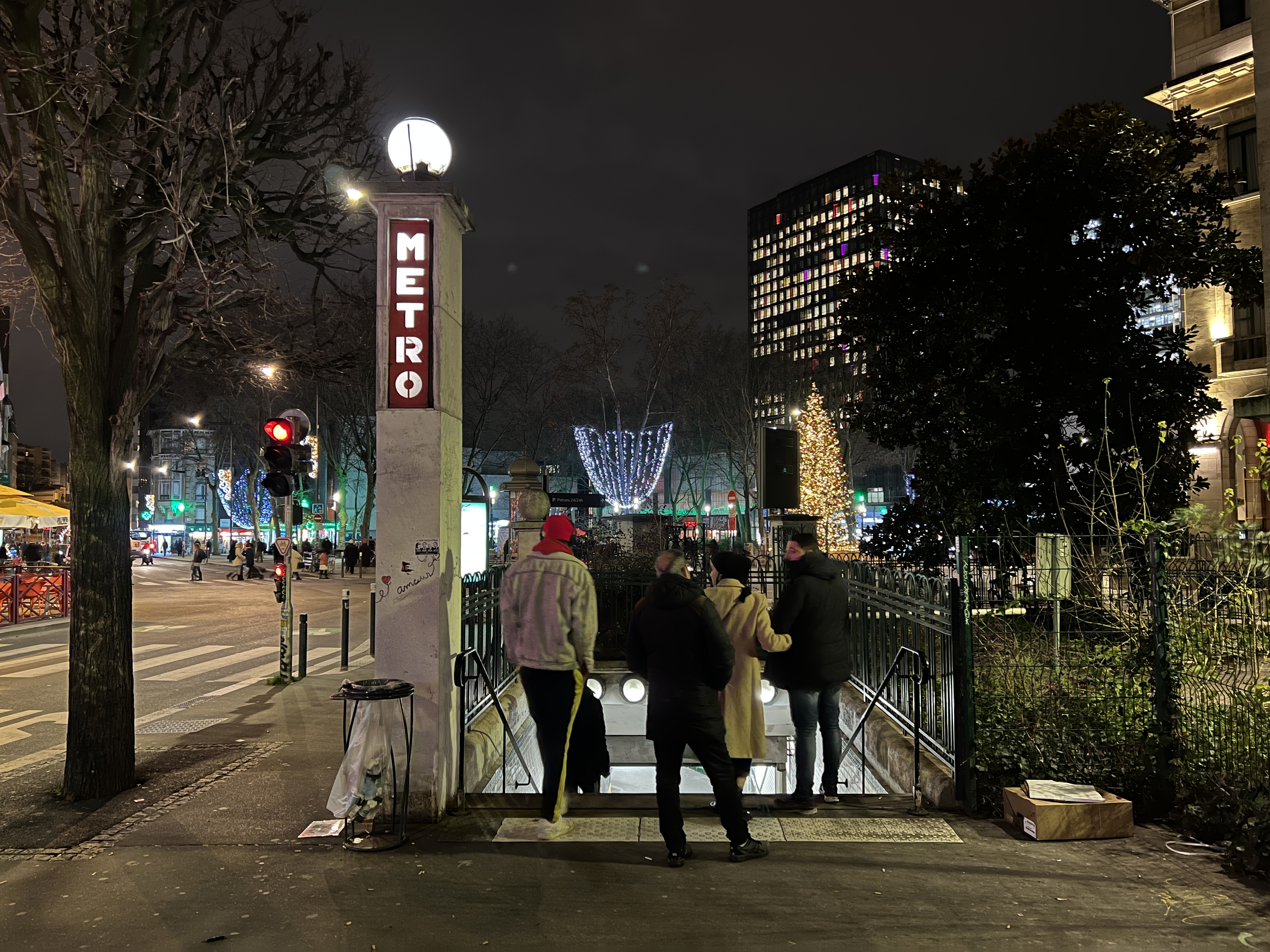
Access 4

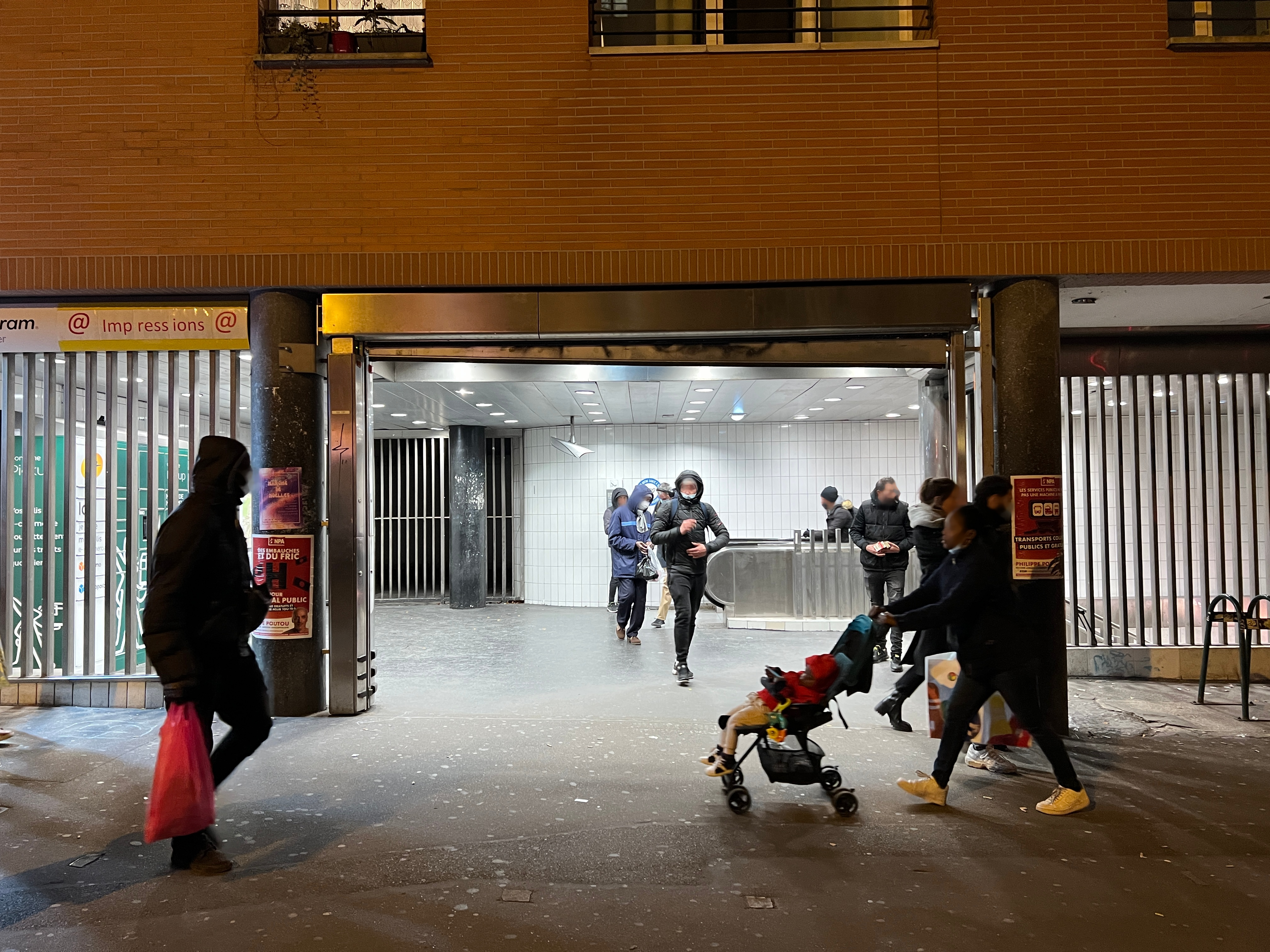
Access 5
