= Marcel Sembat station =

Paris Métro station in Boulogne-Billancourt

Marcel Sembat
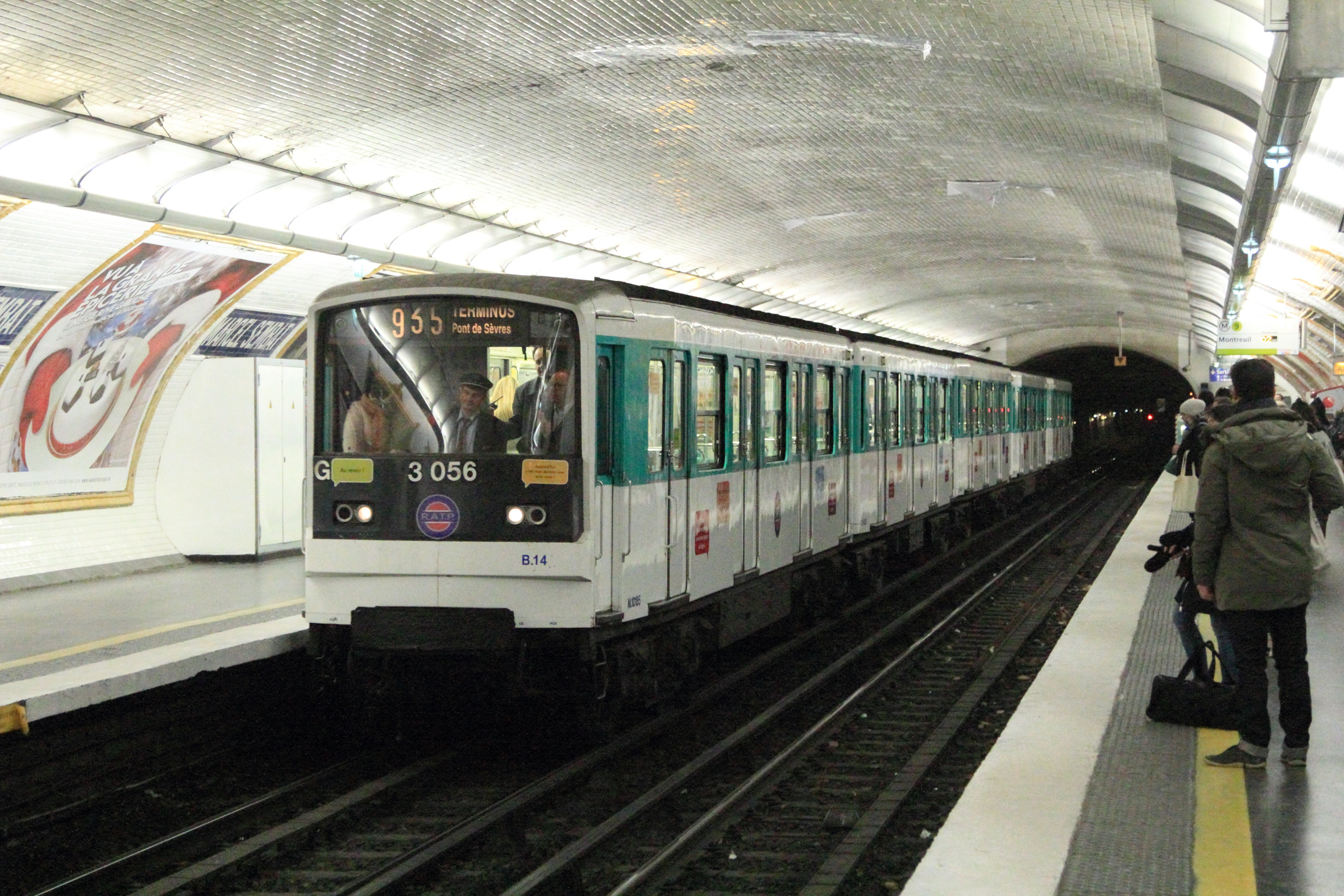
- MF 67 at Marcel Sembat in 2016

General information
- Location: Boulogne-Billancourt; Île-de-France; France
- Coordinates: 48°50′01″N 2°14′37″E
- System: Paris Métro station
- Owner: RATP
- Operator: RATP
- Line: Paris Metro Paris Metro Line 9
- Platforms: 2 (2 side platforms)
- Tracks: 2

Construction
- Accessible: no

Other information
- Station code: 28-08
- Fare zone: 1

History
- Opened: 3 February 1934

Passengers
- 3,874,792 (2021)

Services
Preceding station	Paris Metro	Following station
Billancourt towards Pont de Sèvres	Line 9	Porte de Saint-Cloud towards Mairie de Montreuil
Location
- Location within Paris

Marcel Sembat (French pronunciation: [maʁsɛl sɑ̃ba]) is a station of the Paris Métro. It is named after the nearby place Marcel Sembat which was named after the journalist Marcel Sembat (1862–1922) who was a director of the socialist review La Petite République from 1892 to 1897 and husband of the painter Georgette Agutte from 1897 until their deaths in 1922. He was also the Minister of Public Works from 1914 to 1916 as well as socialist deputy for the 18th arrondissement of Paris's Grandes-Carrières district from 1893 till his death in 1922.

== History ==
The station opened on 3 February 1934 with the extension from Porte de Saint-Cloud to Pont de Sèvres, which was the first extension of the métro network beyond the limits of Paris. Hence, it is one of the first three stations to provide service to the inner suburbs of Paris (along with Billancourt and Pont de Sèvres).

As part of the "Renouveau du métro" programme by the RATP, the station's corridors was renovated and modernised on 23 April 2004.

In 2019, the station was used by 5,521,946 passengers, making it the 73rd busiest of the Métro network out of 302 stations.

In 2020, the station was used by 2,845,520 passengers amidst the COVID-19 pandemic, making it the 59th busiest of the Métro network out of 305 stations.

In 2021, the station was used by 3,874,792 passengers, making it the 62nd busiest of the Métro network out of 305 stations.

== Passenger services ==
=== Access ===
The station has 7 accesses divided into 8 access points:

- Access 1: avenue Victor Hugo (with an ascending escalator)
- Access 2: place Marcel-Sembat
- Access 3: avenue Édouard Vaillant
- Access 4: rue des Quatre Cheminées Patinoire Municipale
- Access 5: avenue André Morizet
- Access 6: rue Rieux
- Access 7: rue Danjou

=== Station layout ===
Street Level
B1	Mezzanine
Platform level	Side platform, doors will open on the right
Platform level	Westbound	← toward Pont de Sèvres (Billancourt)
Platform level	Eastbound	toward Mairie de Montreuil (Porte de Saint-Cloud) →
Platform level	Side platform, doors will open on the right

=== Platforms ===
The station has a standard configuration with two tracks surrounded by two 105-metre-long platforms, and the vault is elliptical. The decoration is in the style used for most metro stations. The lighting canopies are white and rounded in the Gaudin style of the metro revival of the 2000s, and the bevelled white ceramic tiles cover the walls, the vault, and the tunnel exits. The advertising frames are made of honey-coloured earthenware and the name of the station is also made of earthenware in the style of the original CMP. The seats, in the Motte style, are red in colour.

=== Other connections ===
The station is also served by lines 42, 123, 126, 175, and 571 (SUBB) (Boucle Nord) of the RATP bus network, and at night, by lines N12, N61, and N45 of the Noctilien network.

== Gallery ==
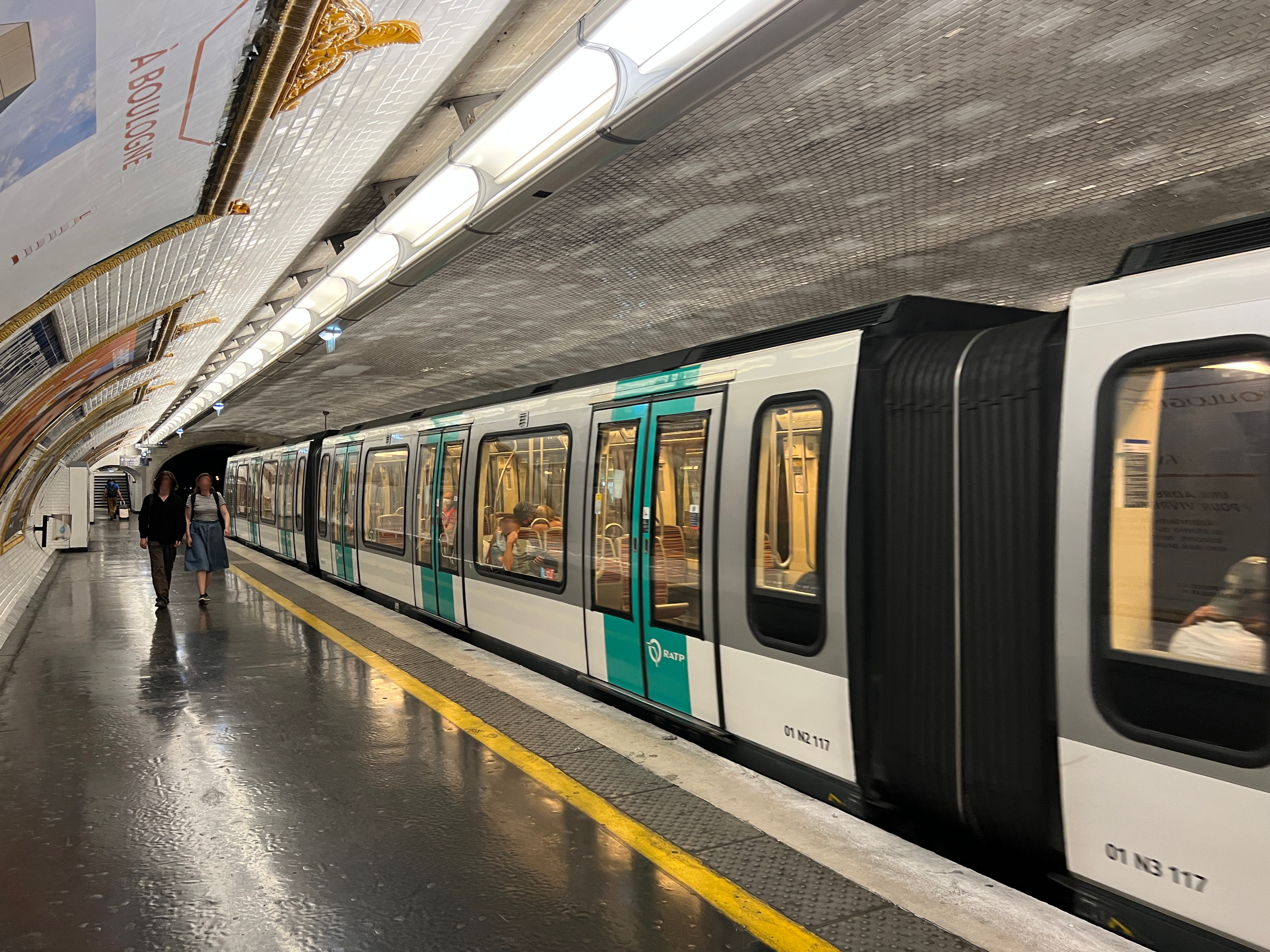
MF 01 at Marcel Sembat

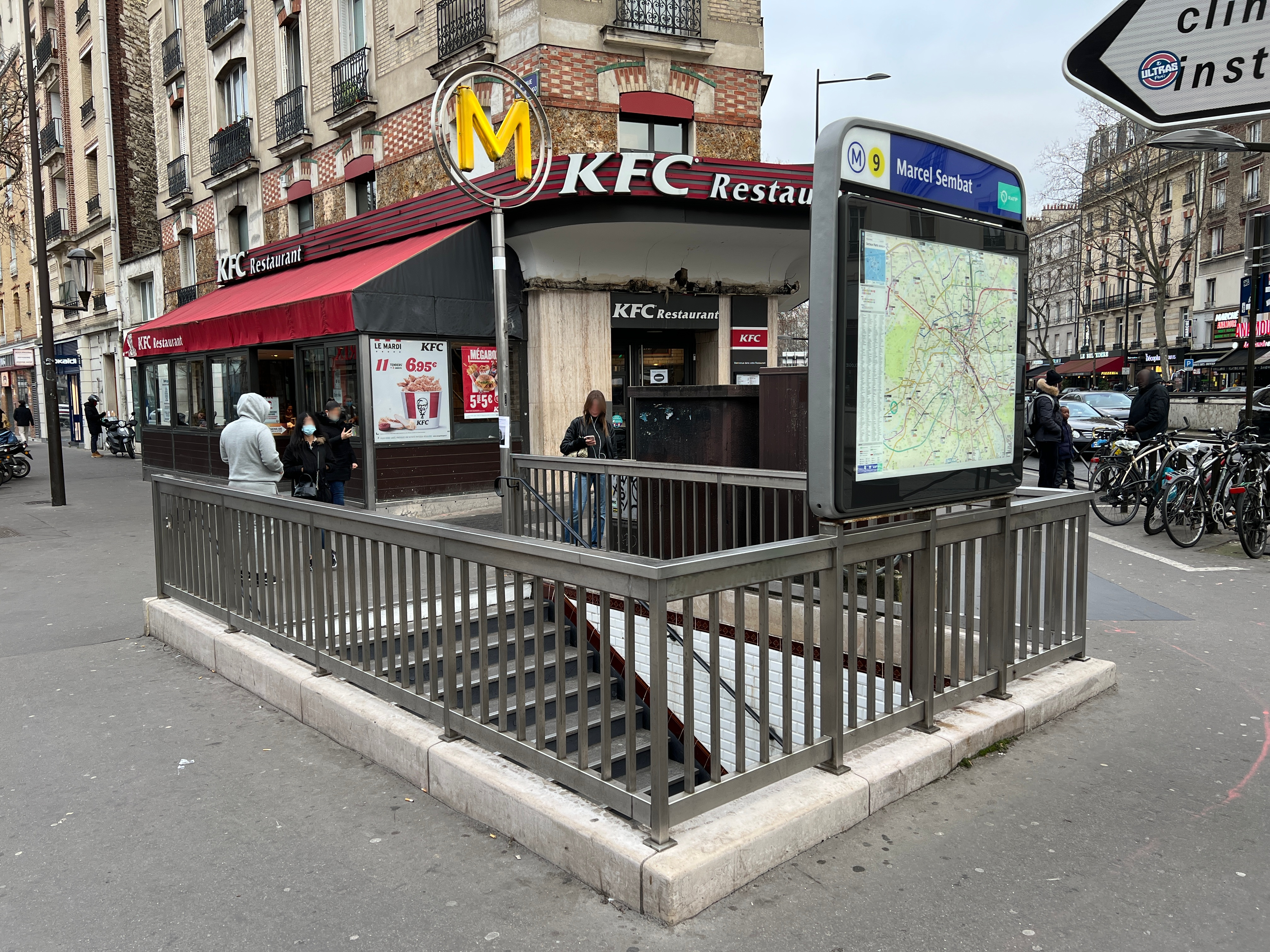
Access 1

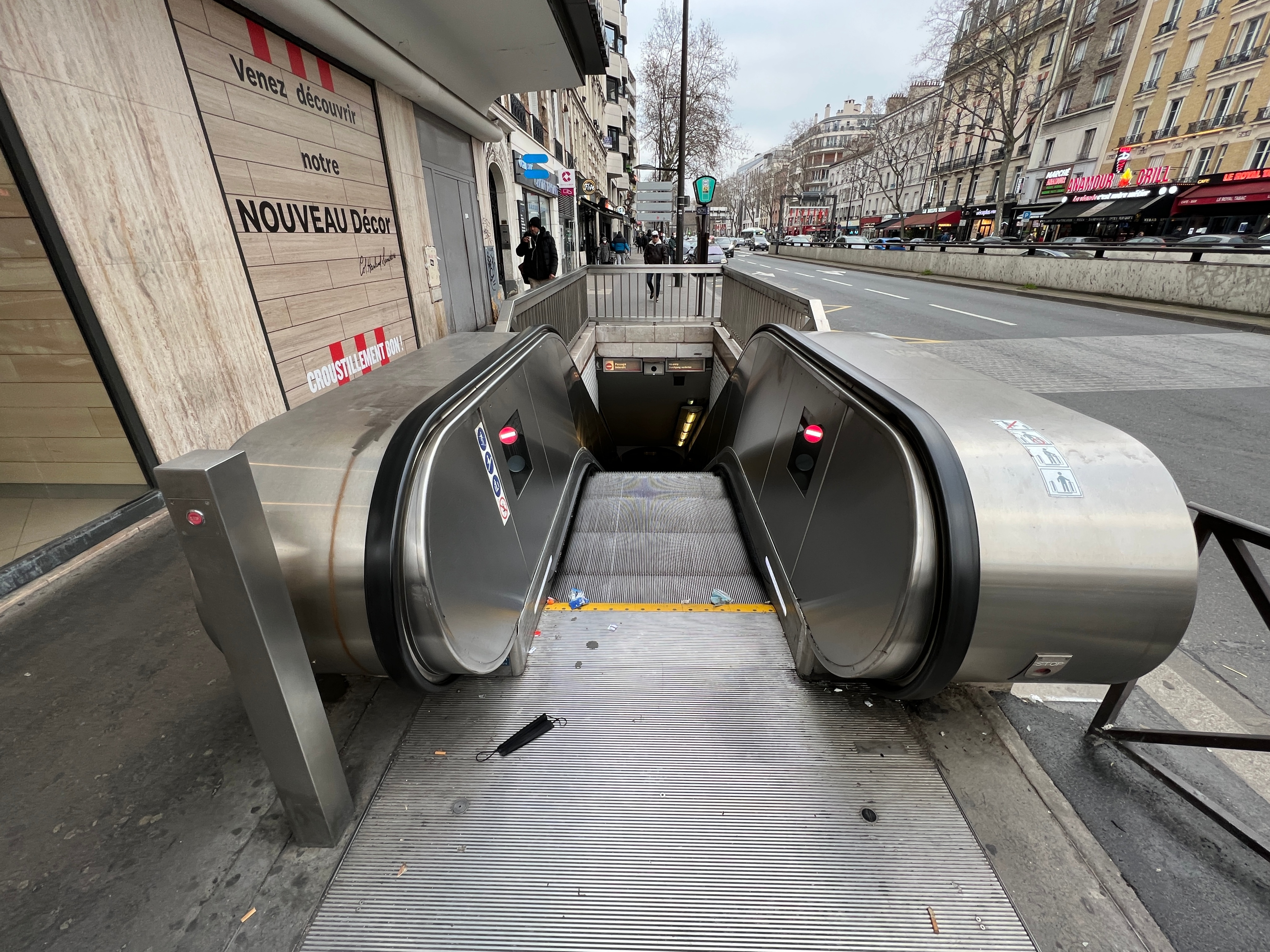
Access 1's escalator

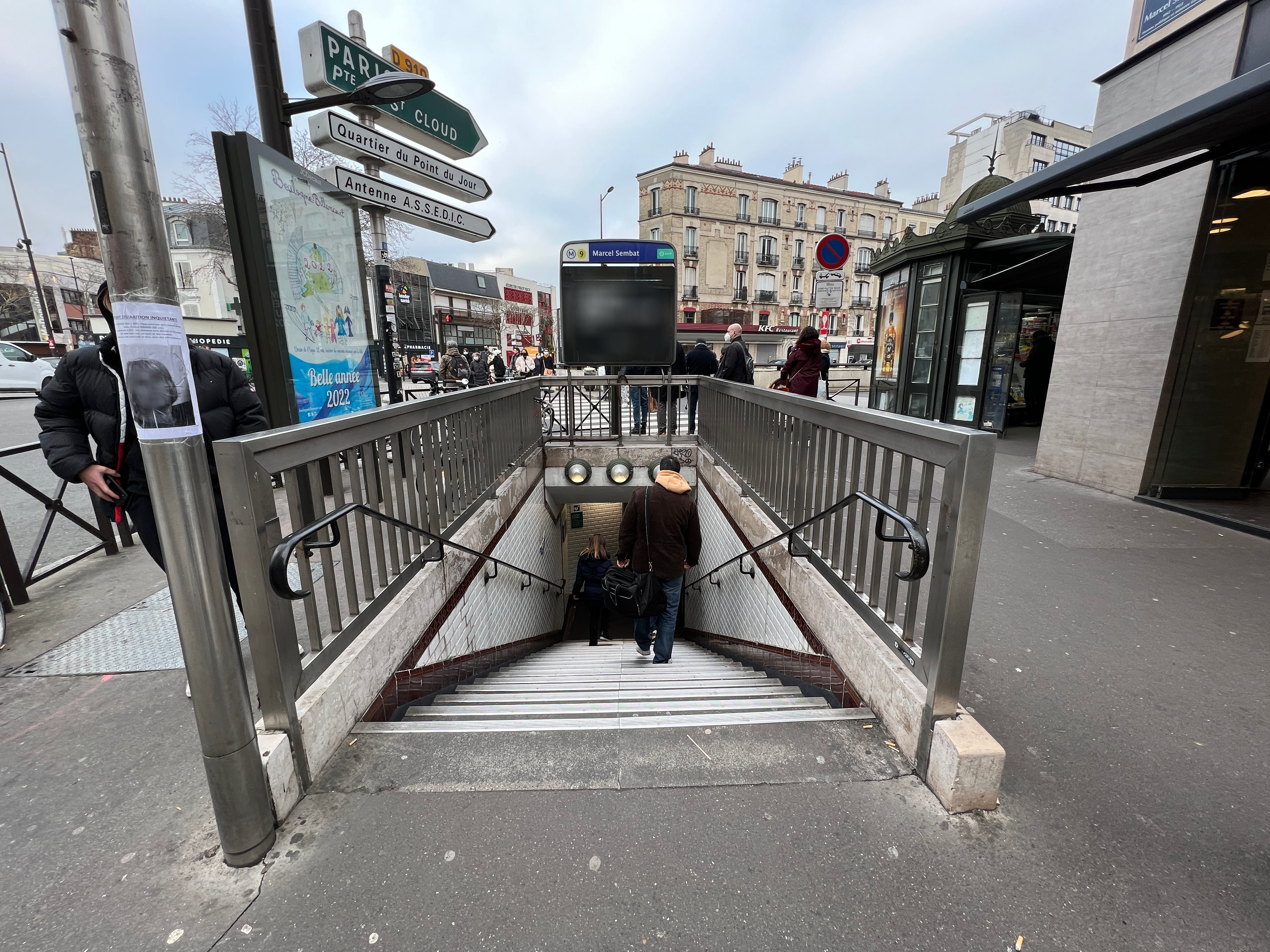
Access 2

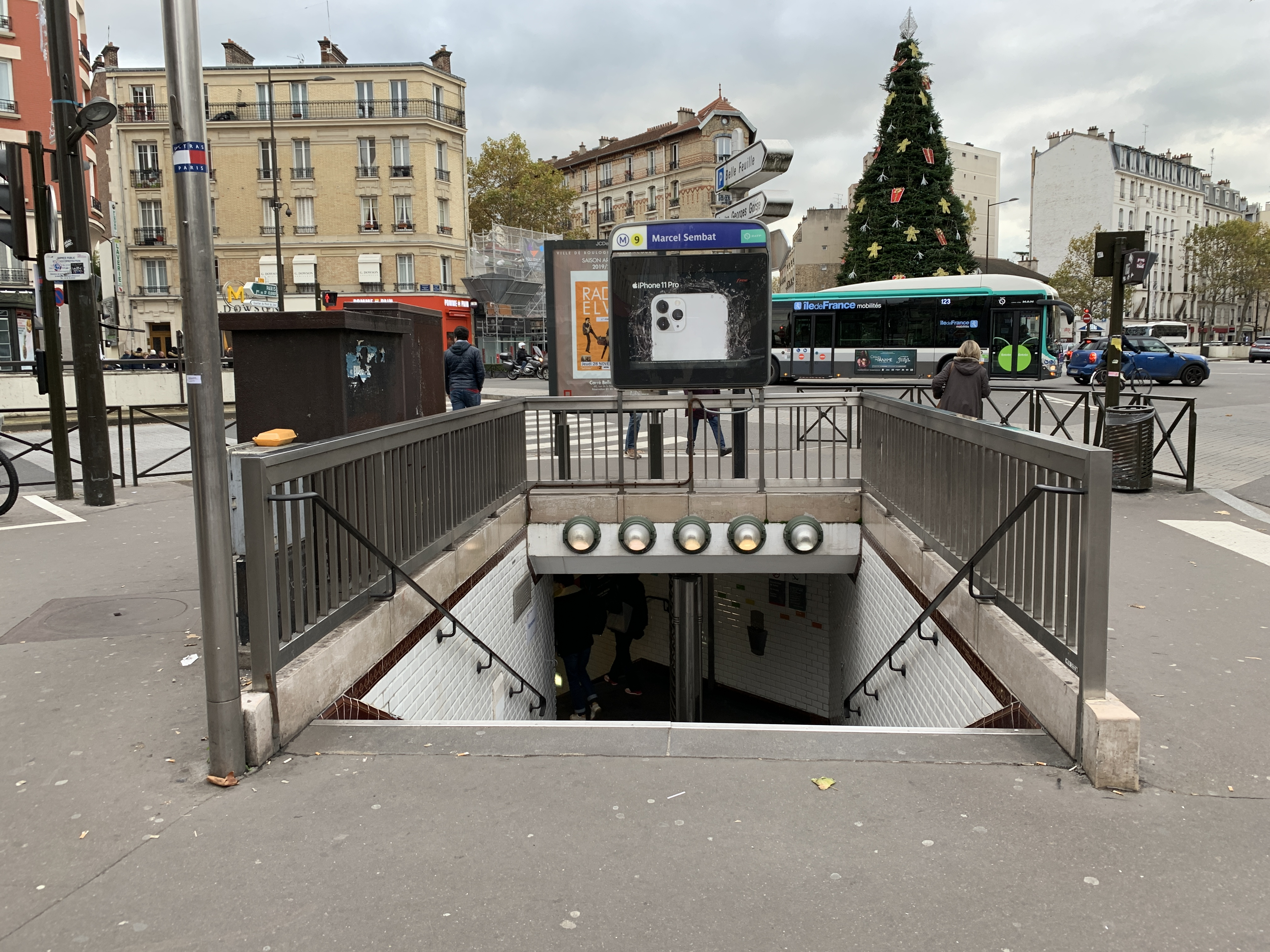
Access 3

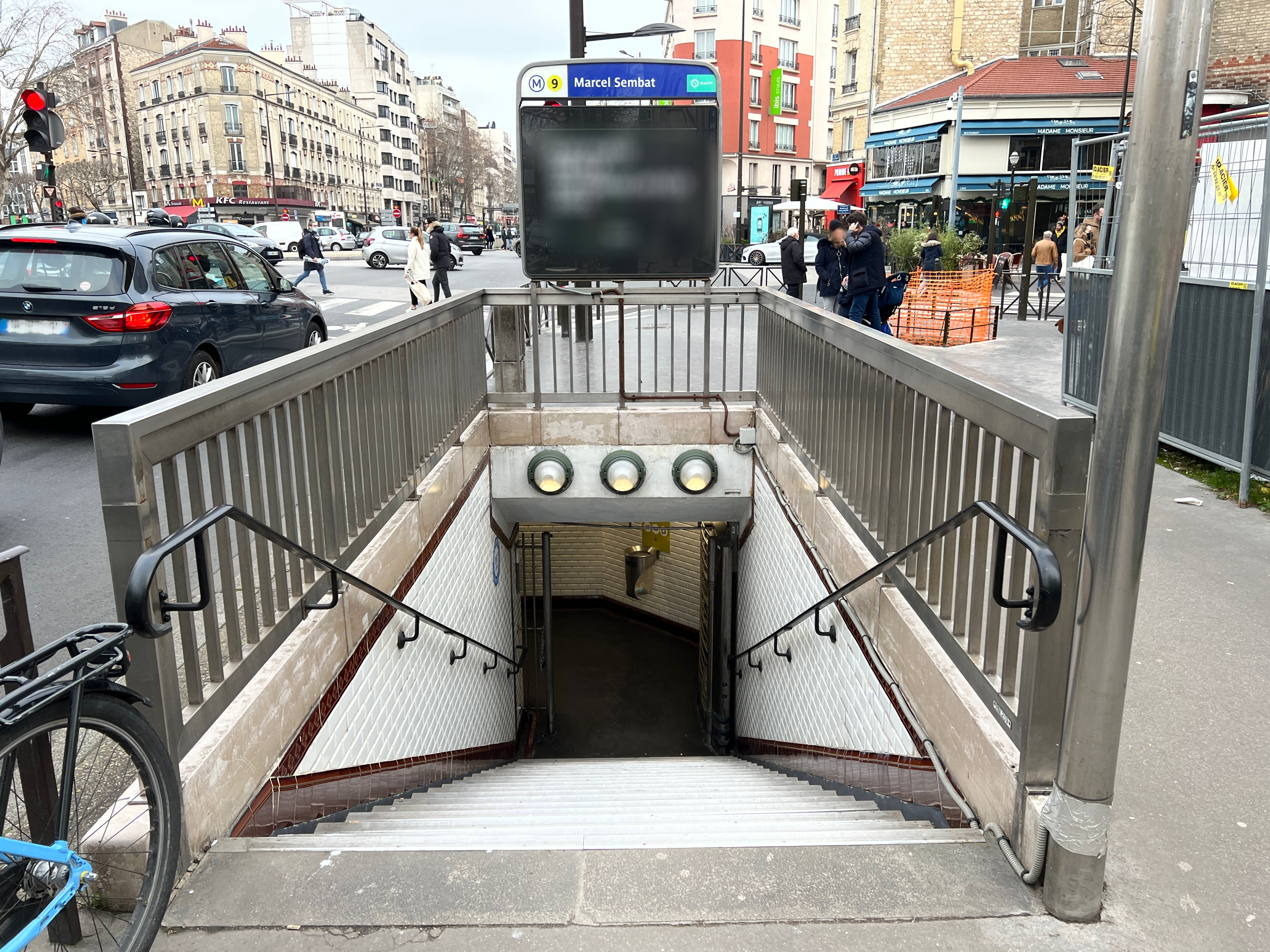
Access 4

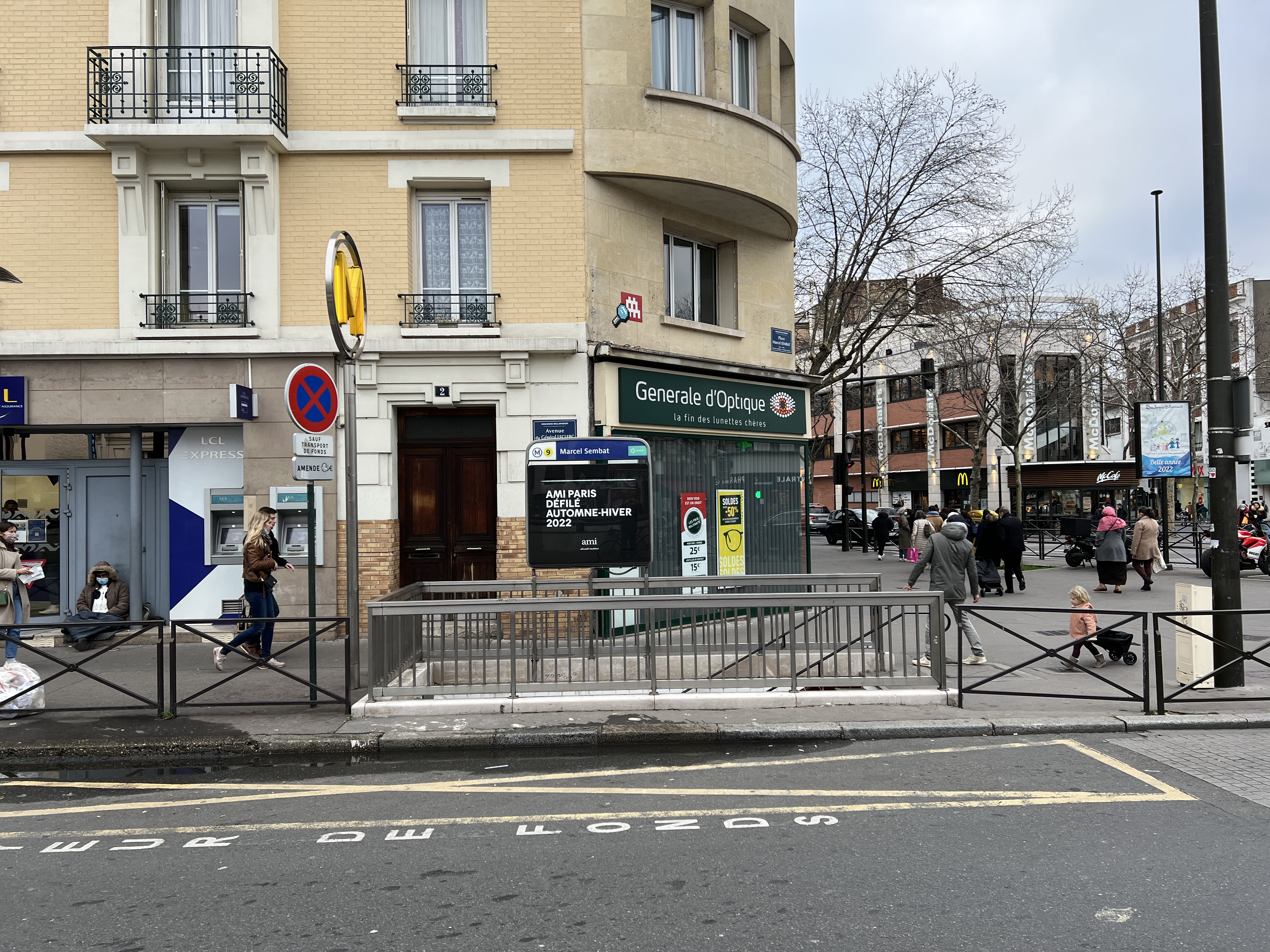
Access 5
