= Billancourt =

Billancourt may refer to:

- Billancourt, Somme, commune in the Somme department
- Boulogne-Billancourt, commune in the western suburbs of Paris
- Billancourt station, a Paris Metro station
