= Billancourt station =

Paris Métro station in Boulogne-Billancourt

Billancourt
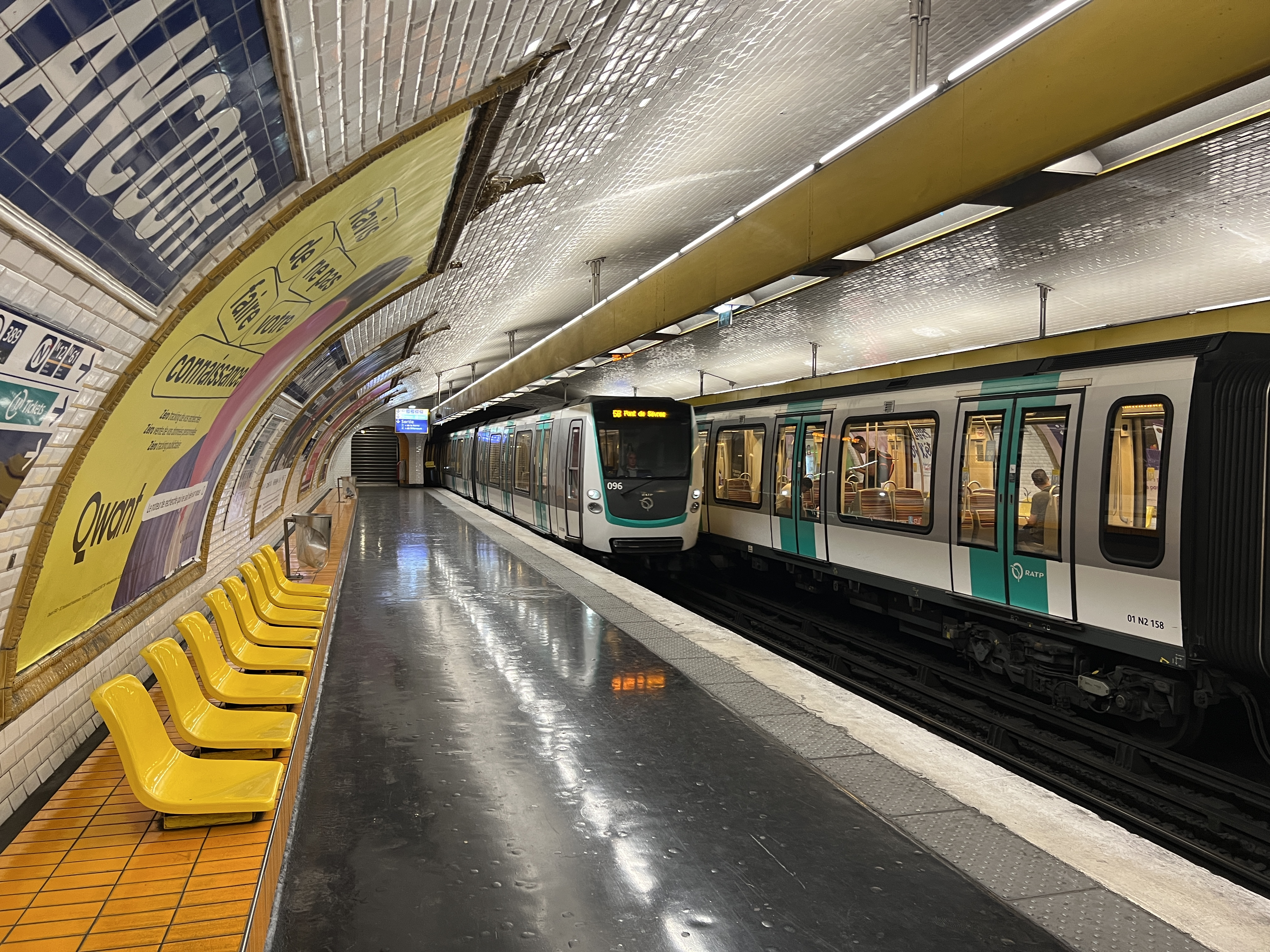
- MF 01 at Billancourt in 2022

General information
- Location: Boulogne-Billancourt; Île-de-France; France
- Coordinates: 48°49′56″N 2°14′17″E
- System: Paris Métro station
- Owner: RATP
- Operator: RATP
- Line: Paris Metro Paris Metro Line 9
- Platforms: 2 (2 side platforms)
- Tracks: 2

Other information
- Station code: 28-09
- Fare zone: 1

History
- Opened: 3 February 1934

Passengers
- 1,967,532 (2021)

Services
Preceding station	Paris Metro	Following station
Pont de Sèvres Terminus	Line 9	Marcel Sembat towards Mairie de Montreuil
Location
- Location within Paris

Billancourt (French: [bijɑ̃kuʁ]) is a station of the Paris Métro, located in the commune of Boulogne-Billancourt. It is named after the nearby rue de Billancourt, which was in turn named after the former village of Billancourt which was annexed in 1859 into the commune of Boulogne-Billancourt.

== History ==
The station opened on 3 February 1934 with the extension of the line from Porte de Saint-Cloud to Pont de Sèvres, which was the first extension of the métro network beyond the limits of Paris. Hence, it is one of the first three stations to provide service to the inner suburbs of Paris (along with Marcel Sembat and Pont de Sèvres).

As part of the "Renouveau du métro" programme by the RATP, the station's corridors was renovated and modernised on 26 July 2001.

In 2019, the station was used by 3,099,341 passengers, making it the 164th busiest of the Métro network out of 302 stations.

In 2020, the station was used by 1,525,990 passengers amidst the COVID-19 pandemic, making it the 173rd busiest of the Métro network out of 305 stations.

In 2021, the station was used by 1,967,532 passengers, making it the 180th busiest of the Métro network out of 305 stations.

== Passenger services ==
=== Access ===
The station has 4 accesses divided into 5 access points on either side of the avenue du Général-Leclerc.

- Access 1: rue de la Ferme
- Access 2: rue de Billancourt
- Access 3: rue Castéjà
- Access 4: rue de Silly

=== Station layout ===
Street Level
B1	Mezzanine
Platform level	Side platform, doors will open on the right
Platform level	Westbound	← toward Pont de Sèvres (Terminus)
Platform level	Eastbound	toward Mairie de Montreuil (Marcel Sembat) →
Platform level	Side platform, doors will open on the right

=== Platforms ===
The station has a standard configuration with two tracks surrounded by two 105-metre-long platforms separated by the metro tracks and the vault is elliptical. The decoration is in the Andreu-Motte style with two yellow light canopies, benches and aisle outlets treated in flat yellow tiles as well as Motte seats in the same colour. These fittings are combined with the bevelled white ceramic tiles that cover the walls, the vault, and the tunnel exits. The advertising frames are made of honey-coloured earthenware and the name of the station is also made of earthenware in the style of the original CMP.

It is one of the few stations to still present the Andreu-Motte style in its entirety, if we exclude the tunnel exits (whose treatment with flat coloured tiles was not systematic).

=== Other connections ===
The station is also served by line 389 of the RATP bus network, and at night, by lines N12 and N61 bus of the Noctilien network.

== Gallery ==
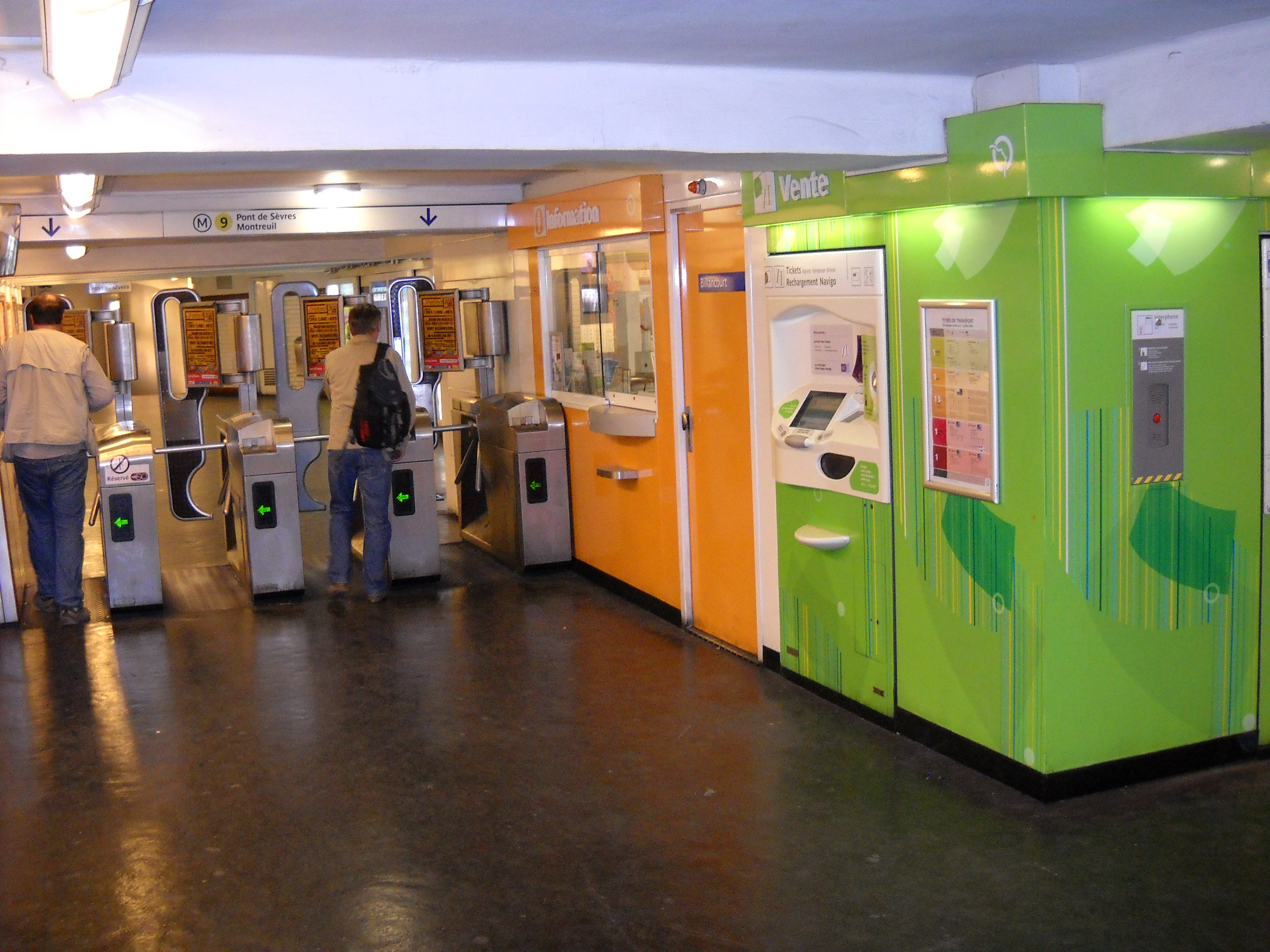
Billancourt ticket hall

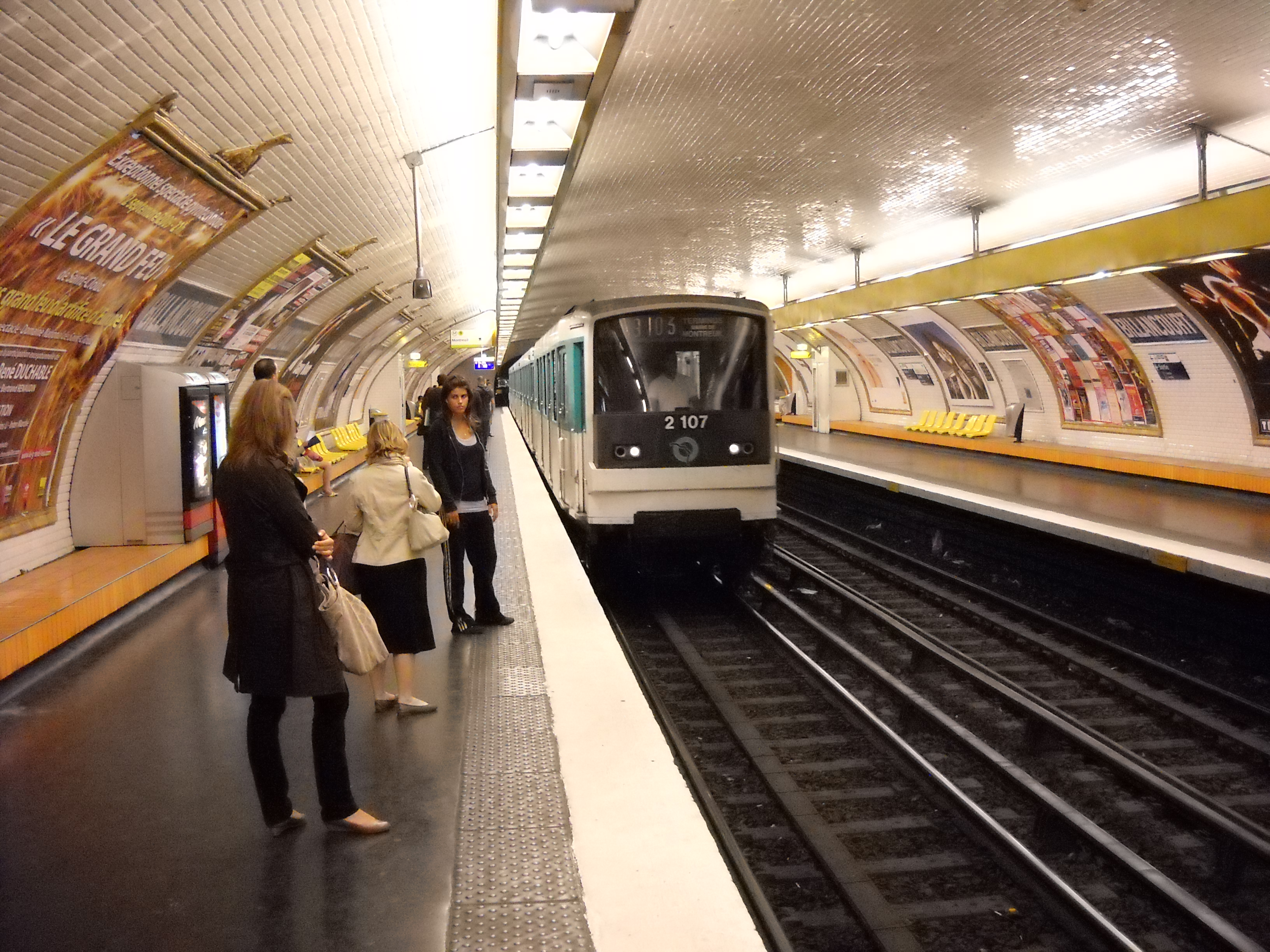
MF 67 at Billancourt

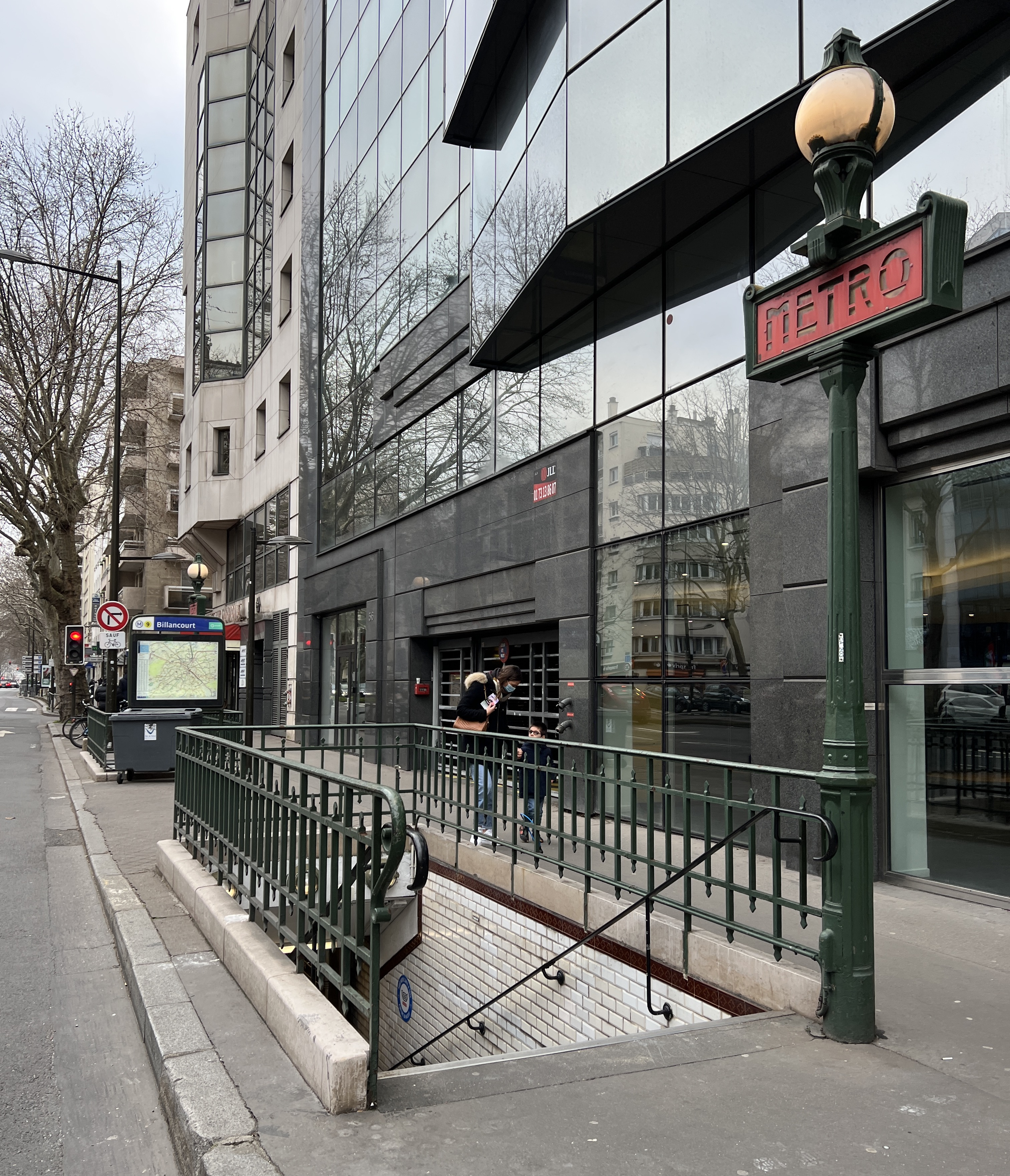
One of the accesses
