= Exelmans station =

Paris Métro station

Exelmans
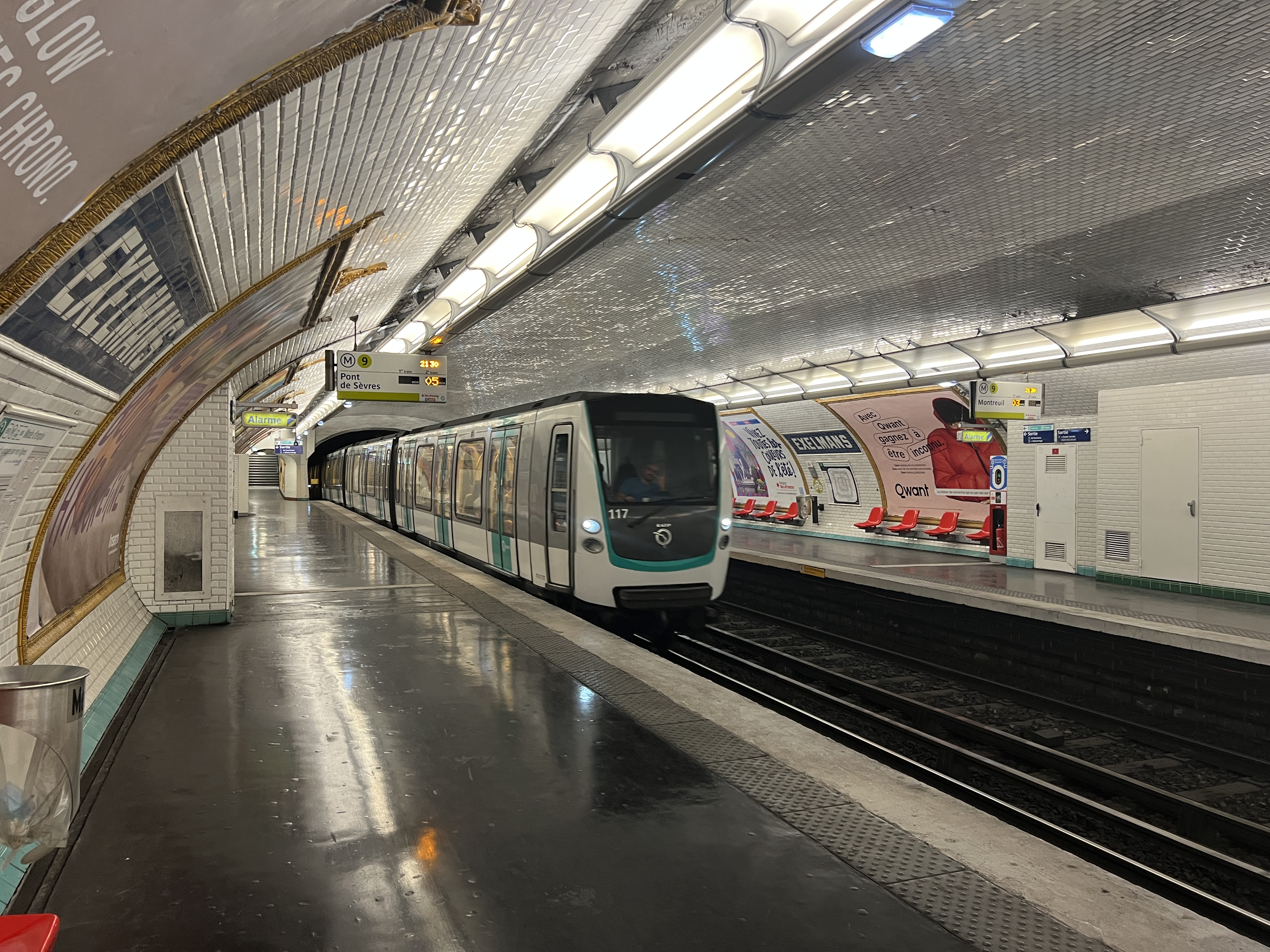
- MF 01 at Exelmans

General information
- Location: 16th arrondissement of Paris; Île-de-France; France
- Coordinates: 48°50′33″N 2°15′34″E
- System: Paris Métro station
- Owner: RATP
- Operator: RATP
- Line: Paris Metro Paris Metro Line 9
- Platforms: 2 (2 side platforms)
- Tracks: 2

Construction
- Accessible: no

Other information
- Station code: 0714
- Fare zone: 1

History
- Opened: 8 November 1922

Passengers
- 1,607,223 (2021)

Services
Preceding station	Paris Metro	Following station
Porte de Saint-Cloud towards Pont de Sèvres	Line 9	Michel-Ange–Molitor towards Mairie de Montreuil
Location
- Location within Paris

Exelmans (French: [ɛɡzɛlmɑ̃]) is a station on line 9 of the Paris Métro. It owes its name to its proximity to boulevard Exelmans, which was in turn named after Rémi Joseph Isidore Exelmans (1775-1852), a general of Napoleon's cavalry.

== History ==
The station opened on 8 November 1922 with the opening of the initial section of the line from Trocadéro and served as its eastern terminus until the line was further extended to Porte de Saint-Cloud the following year.

As part of the "Renouveau du métro" programme by the RATP, the station's corridors was renovated and modernised on 11 December 2007. A small exhibit on the singer Claude François who had lived nearby in the past was also removed as part of the programme.

In 2019, the station was used by 2,102,492 passengers, making it the 239th busiest of the Métro network out of 302 stations.

In 2020, the station was used by 1,055,609 passengers amidst the COVID-19 pandemic, making it the 236th busiest of the Métro network out of 305 stations.

In 2021, the station was used by 1,607,223 passengers, making it the 219th busiest of the Métro network out of 305 stations.

== Passenger services ==
=== Access ===
The station has 3 accesses:

- Access 1: boulevard Exelmans
- Access 2: rue Michel-Ange (with a rare Val d'Osne totem)
- Access 3: rue Claude-Lorrain Hôpital Henry Dunant

=== Station layout ===
Street Level
B1	Mezzanine
Platform level	Side platform, doors will open on the right
Platform level	Westbound	← toward Pont de Sèvres (Porte de Saint-Cloud)
Platform level	Eastbound	toward Mairie de Montreuil (Michel-Ange – Molitor) →
Platform level	Side platform, doors will open on the right

=== Platforms ===
The station has a standard configuration with two tracks surrounded by two side platforms, and the vault is elliptical. The decoration is in the style used for most metro stations. The lighting canopies are white and rounded in the Gaudin style of the metro revival of the 2000s, and the bevelled white ceramic tiles cover the walls, the vault, and the tunnel exits. The advertising frames are made of honey-coloured earthenware with plant motifs and the name of the station is also incorporated into the wall tiles, in the interwar decorative style of the original CMP. The Motte style seats are red in colour.

=== Other connections ===
The station is also served by lines 62 (only in the direction of Porte de France) and 88 of the RATP bus network.

== Gallery ==
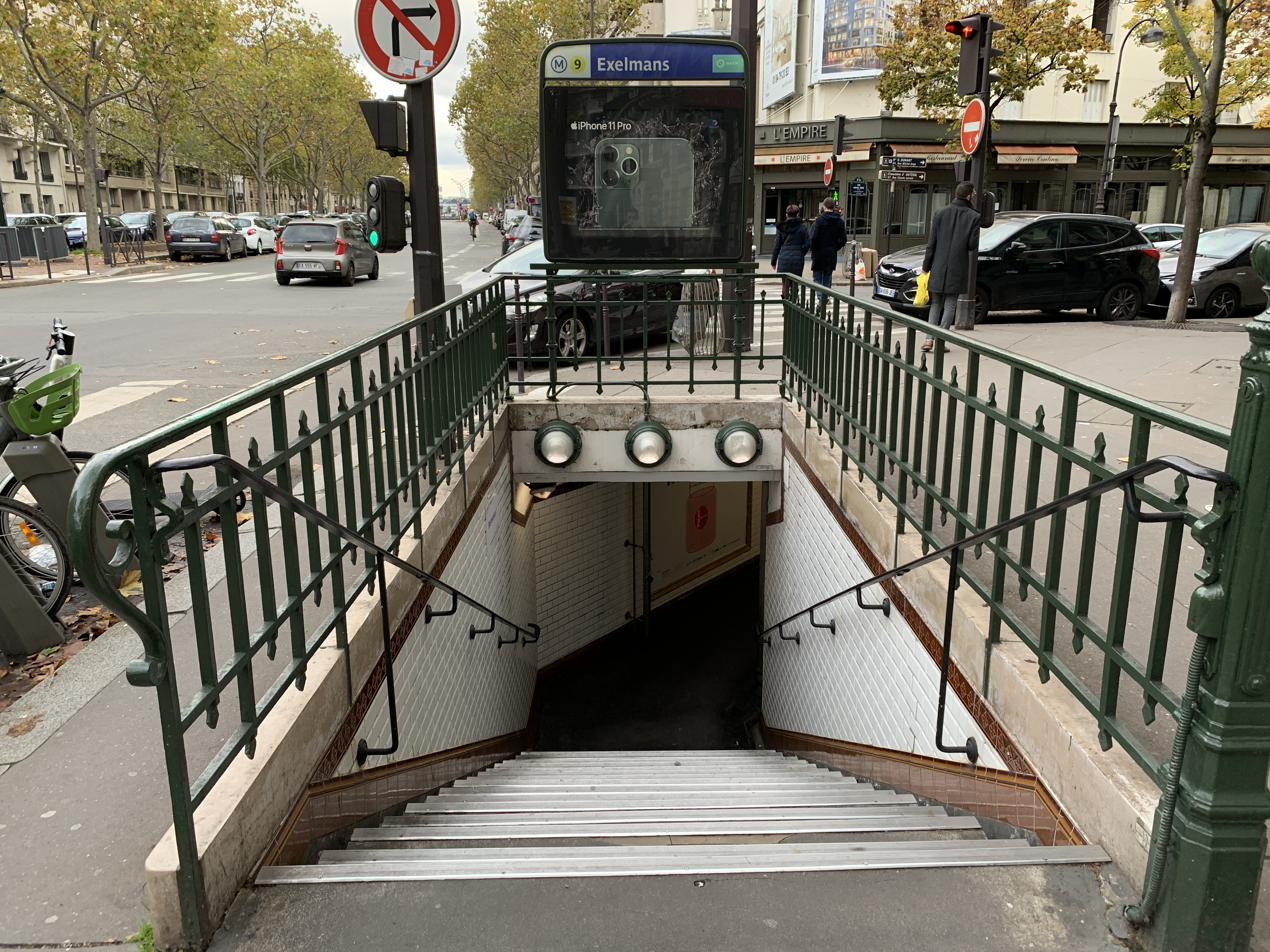
Access 1

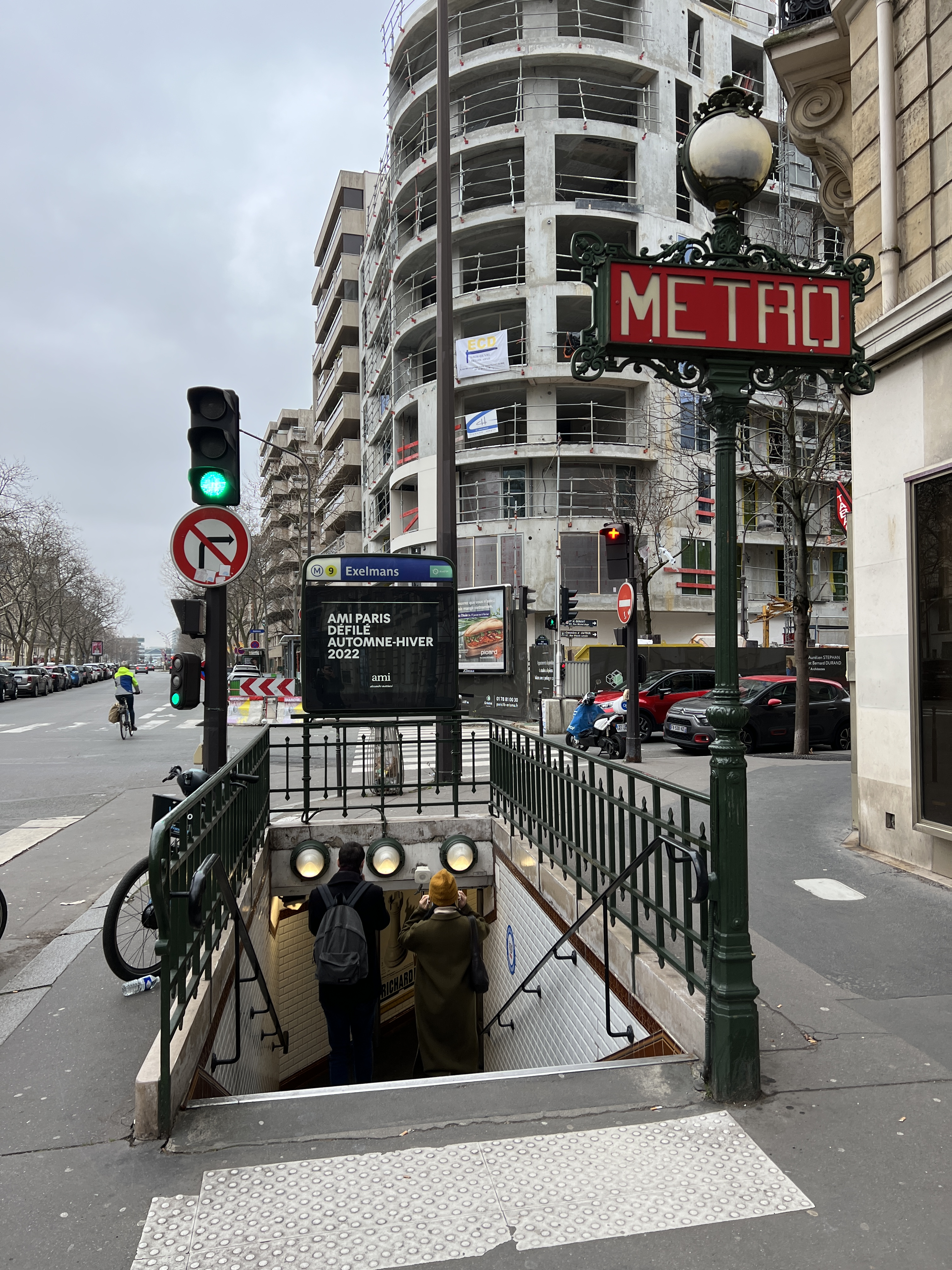
Access 2

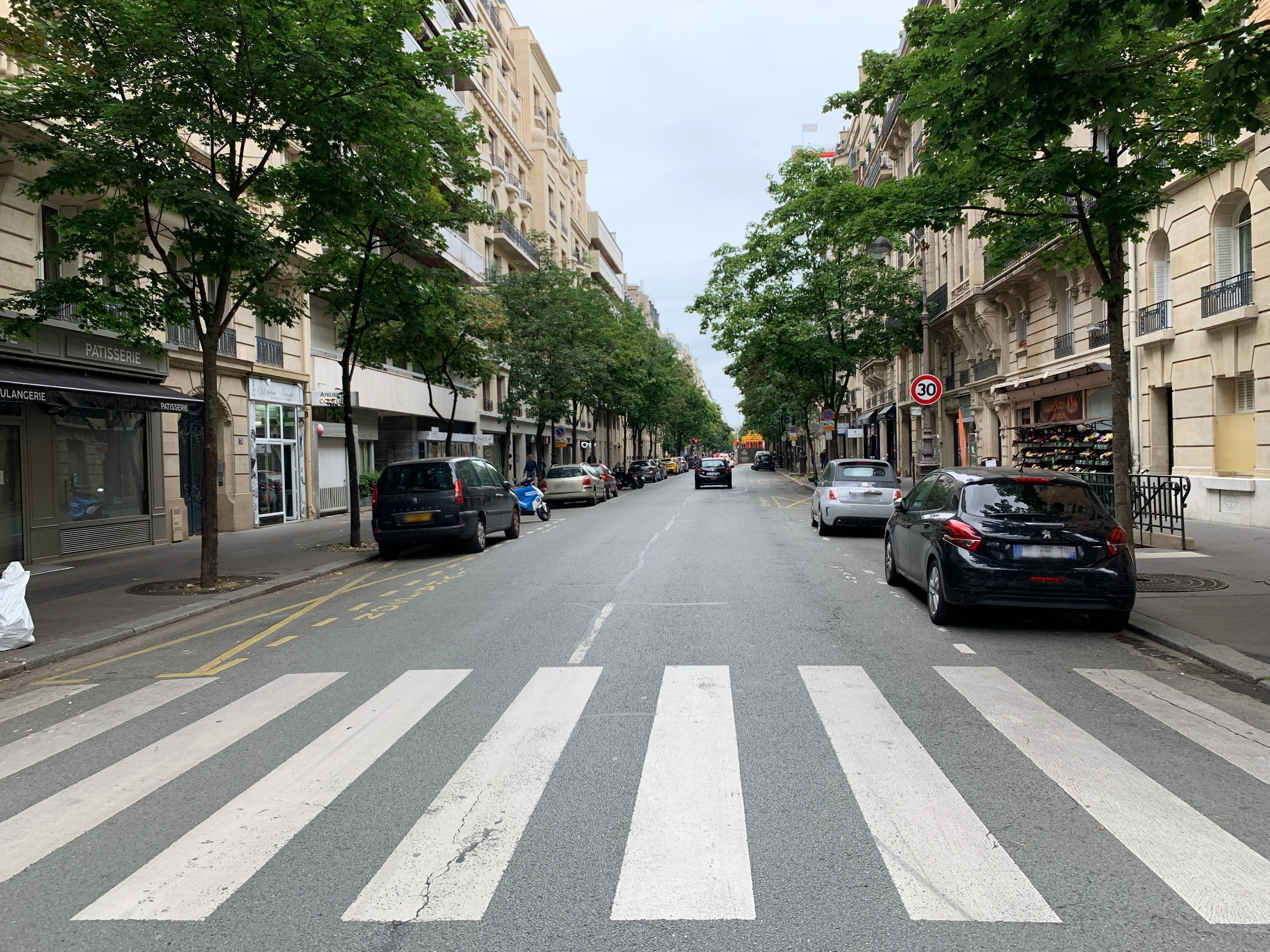
Access 3
