= Marcel Sembat =

French politician (1862–1922)

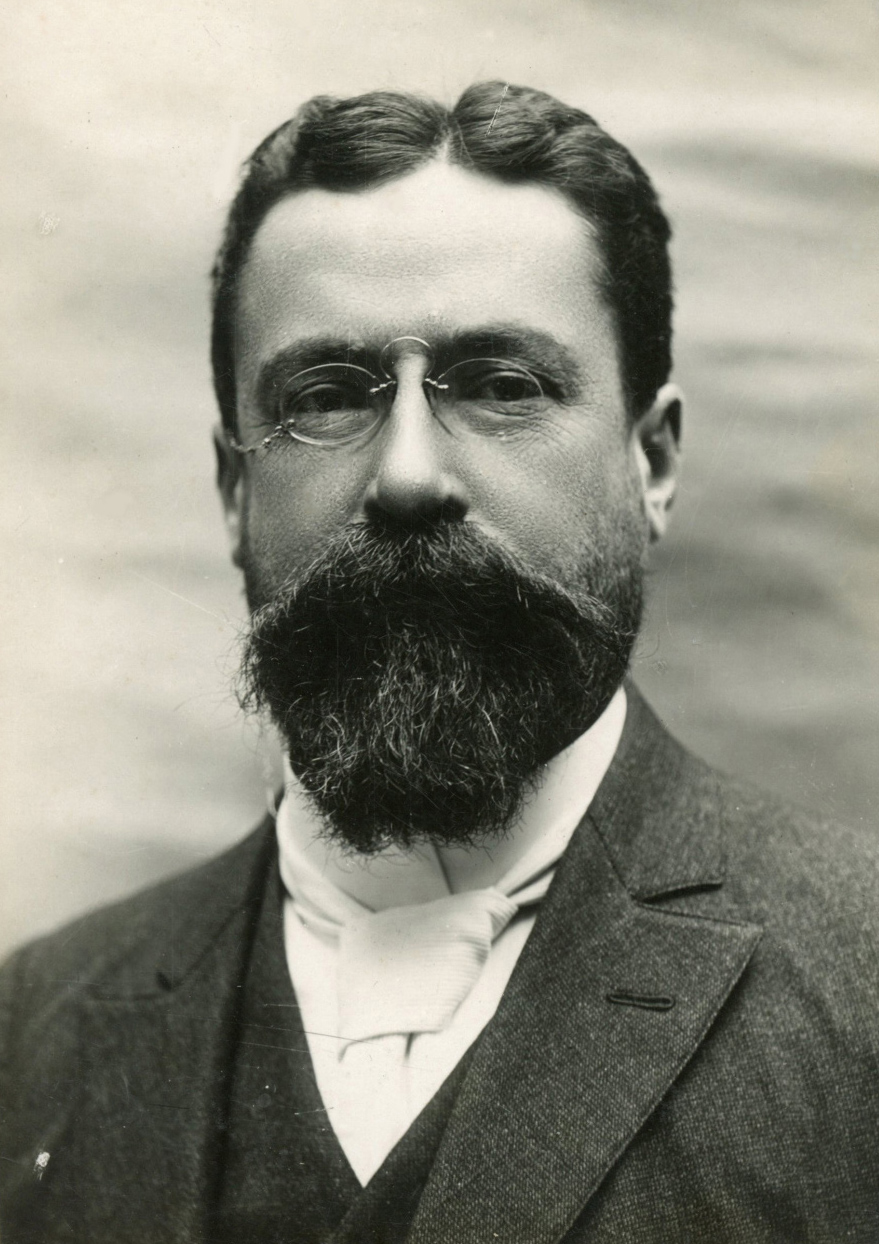
Marcel Sembat c. 1910

Marcel Étienne Sembat (French pronunciation: [maʁsɛl sɑ̃ba]; 19 October 1862 – 5 September 1922) was a French lawyer and politician. He served as a Socialist member of the Chamber of Deputies for Seine from 1893 to 1922, and as Minister of Public Works from 26 August 1914 to 12 December 1916 under Prime Ministers René Viviani and Aristide Briand.

== Biography ==
=== Early life ===
Marcel Sembat was born on 19 October 1862, in Bonnières-sur-Seine, then in Seine-et-Oise, France. He went to school in Mantes-la-Jolie, attended the Collège Stanislas in Paris and later received a PhD in law.

=== Journalism ===
He started a career in journalism and co-founded the Revue de l'évolution. From 1890 to 1897, he was the editor of La Petite République, created by Leon Gambetta. It was then that he became a Socialist. He also wrote for La Revue socialiste, La Revue de l'enseignement primaire, Documents du Progrès, La Lanterne, Petit sou and Paris-Journal. He later became an editor of L'Humanité.

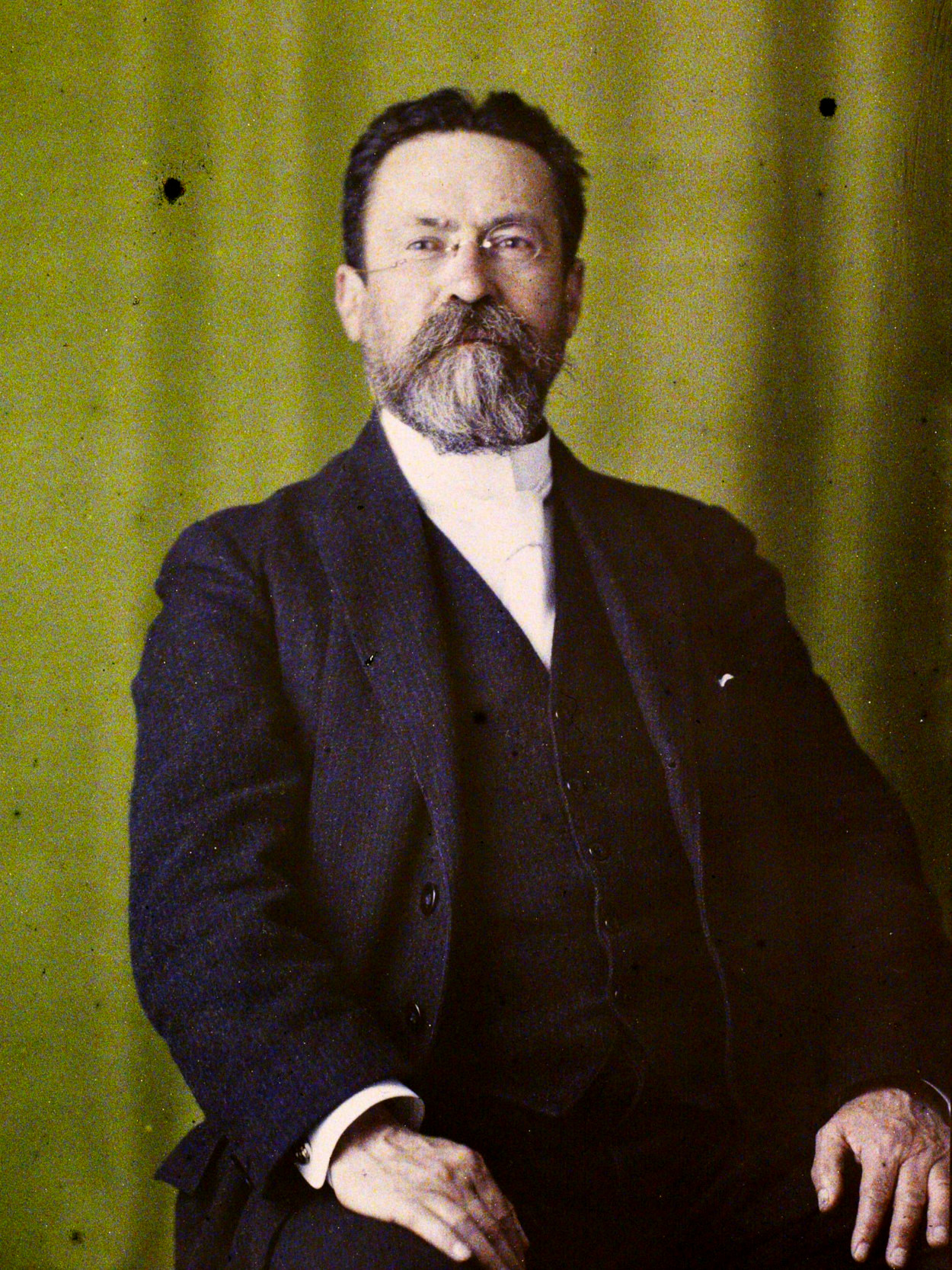
Autochrome portrait by Auguste Léon, 1921

=== Politics ===
He served as a member of the Chamber of Deputies for Seine from 1893 until his death in 1922. A socialist, he supported workers' rights during strikes. He oversaw the construction of telephone cables from Brest, France to Dakar, Senegal. He supported Algerians against French colonialists in French Algeria. He was opposed to the presence of French Christian missionaries in China.

He served as Minister of Public Works from 1914 to 1916, under Prime Ministers René Viviani and Aristide Briand.

=== Personal life ===
On 27 February 1897, he married the Fauvist painter and sculptor Georgette Agutte. He wrote a book about Henri Matisse.

=== Death ===
He died of cerebral hemorrhage on 5 September 1922, in Chamonix, Haute-Savoie, France.

== Legacy ==
- The station of the Paris Métro Marcel Sembat is named for him.
- The Lycée Marcel Sembat in Sotteville-lès-Rouen is named for him.
- Boulevard Agutte-Sembat in Grenoble is named for his wife and him.

== Bibliography ==
- Leur Bilan, quatre ans de pouvoir Clemenceau-Briand (Paris, Librairie du Parti socialiste S.F.I.O., 1910)
- Faites un roi, sinon faites la paix (E. Figuière et Cie : Paris, 1911)
- Henri Matisse, trente reproductions de peintures et dessins, précédées d'une étude critique par Marcel Sembat, de notices biographiques et documentaires (Paris : Éditions de la Nouvelle revue française, 1920)
- La Victoire en déroute (prefaced by Léon Blum, Paris : Éditions du Progrès civique, 1925)
