= Porte de Saint-Cloud station =

Metro station in Paris, France

Porte de Saint-Cloud Parc des Princes
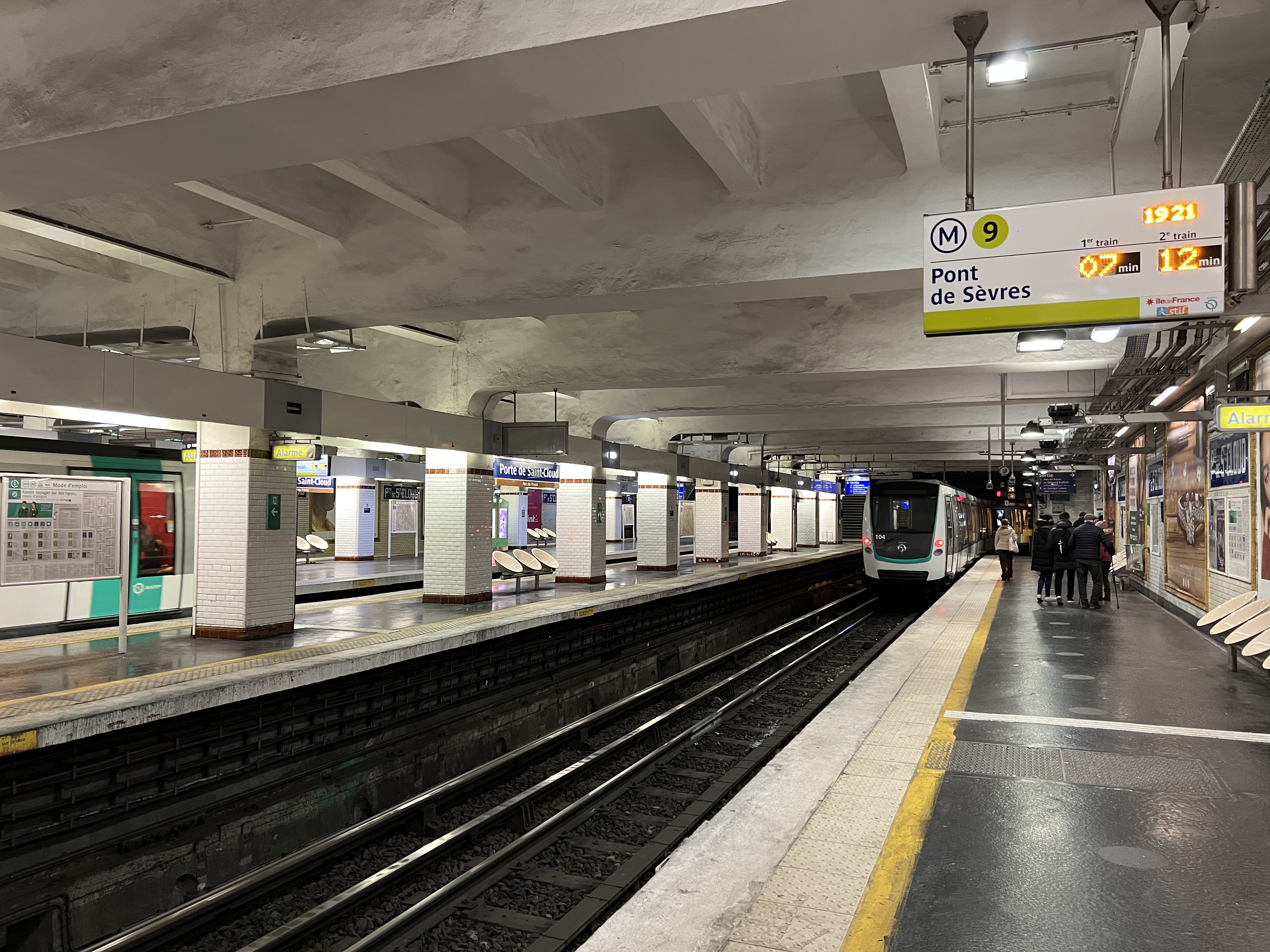
- MF 01 at Porte de Saint-Cloud

General information
- Location: 16th arrondissement of Paris; Île-de-France; France
- Coordinates: 48°50′17″N 2°15′25″E
- System: Paris Métro station
- Owner: RATP
- Operator: RATP
- Line: Paris Metro Paris Metro Line 9
- Platforms: 5 (2 island platforms, 1 side platform)
- Tracks: 4

Construction
- Accessible: no

Other information
- Station code: 0703
- Fare zone: 1

History
- Opened: 29 September 1923

Passengers
- 3,485,946 (2021)

Services
Preceding station	Paris Metro	Following station
Marcel Sembat towards Pont de Sèvres	Line 9	Exelmans towards Mairie de Montreuil
Location
- Location within Paris

Porte de Saint-Cloud (French pronunciation: [pɔʁt də sɛ̃ klu]; lit. 'Gate of Saint-Cloud') is a station on Line 9 of the Paris Métro in the 16th arrondissement. The station is named after the Porte de Saint-Cloud, a gate in the 19th-century Thiers wall of Paris, which led to the town of Saint-Cloud. It is the westernmost Métro station in the City of Paris.

It serves the Parc des Princes and Stade Jean-Bouin, respectively the homes of football clubs Paris Saint-Germain and Paris FC.

== History ==
The station opened on 28 September 1923 with the extension of the line from Exelmans, serving as its western terminus until its extension to Pont de Sèvres in 1934. A track exists to the west of the station in a tunnel called Voie Murat which leads to the ghost station of Porte Molitor, ultimately connecting to the southwest of the Auteuil loop on Line 10. It also leads to the Auteuil workshops.

In 2019, the station was used by 5,174,694 passengers, making it the 77th busiest of the Métro network out of 302 stations.

In 2020, the station was used by 2,576,290 passengers amidst the COVID-19 pandemic, making it the 80th busiest of the Métro network out of 305 stations.

In 2021, the station was used by 3,485,946 passengers, making it the 78th busiest of the Métro network out of 305 stations.

== Passenger services ==
=== Access ===
The station has 6 accesses:

- Access 1: Parc des Princes
- Access 2: avenue Édouard-Vaillant Boulogne Billancourt
- Access 3: avenue Georges-Lafont
- Access 4: rue Gudin
- Access 5: avenue de Versailles
- Access 6: boulevard Murat

=== Station layout ===
Street Level
B1	Mezzanine
Platform level	Side platform, doors will open on the right
Platform level	Westbound	← toward Pont de Sèvres (Marcel Sembat)
Platform level	Eastbound	toward Mairie de Montreuil (Exelmans) →
Platform level	Island platform, doors will open on the left
Platform level	Eastbound	toward Mairie de Montreuil (Exelmans) →
Platform level	Island platform, doors will open on the left, right
Platform level	Eastbound	toward Mairie de Montreuil (Exelmans) →

=== Platforms ===
The station has a particular arrangement specific to the stations serving or had served as a terminus. It has four tracks divided amongst two island platforms and one side platform. Trains from Mairie de Montreuil can only stop on the northernmost track (the side platform) while trains from Pont de Sèvres usually stop on the southernmost track, although it occasionally uses the two central tracks either for long-term stabling or to allow short-working trips to turn back trains to Mairie de Montreuil for passenger services to allow for a higher frequency along that stretch.

=== Other connections ===
The station is also served by the following bus networks:

- RATP bus network: lines 22, 42, 62, 72, 175, 189, 289, and PC
- Sénart bus network : line 3754
- Noctilien: lines N12 and N61

== Nearby ==
- Fontaines de la porte de Saint-Cloud
- Hôpital Henri-Dunant
- Lycée Claude-Bernard
- Parc des Princes
- Stade Pierre-de-Coubertin
- Place de la Porte-de-Saint-Cloud

== Gallery ==
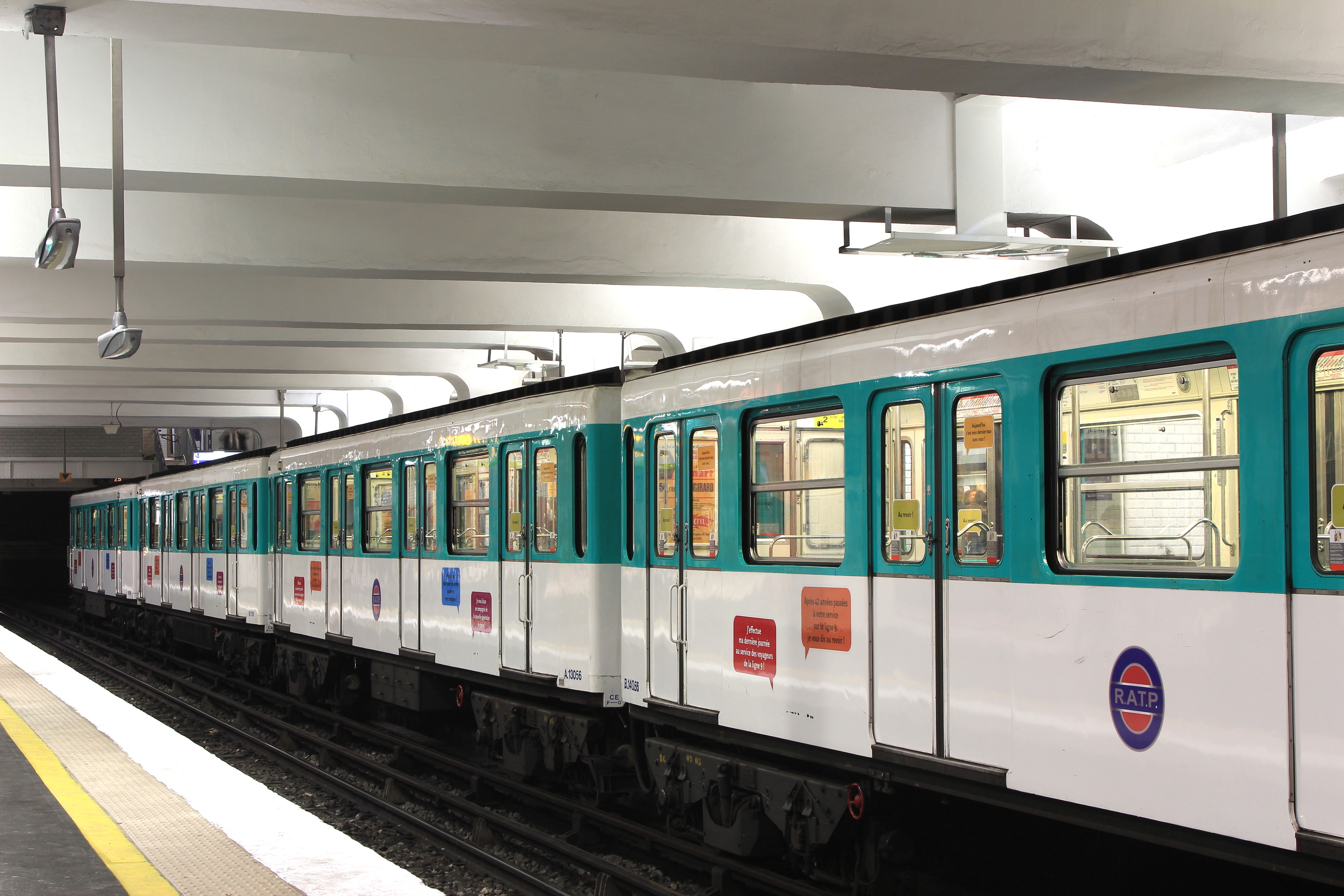
MF 67 at Porte de Saint-Cloud

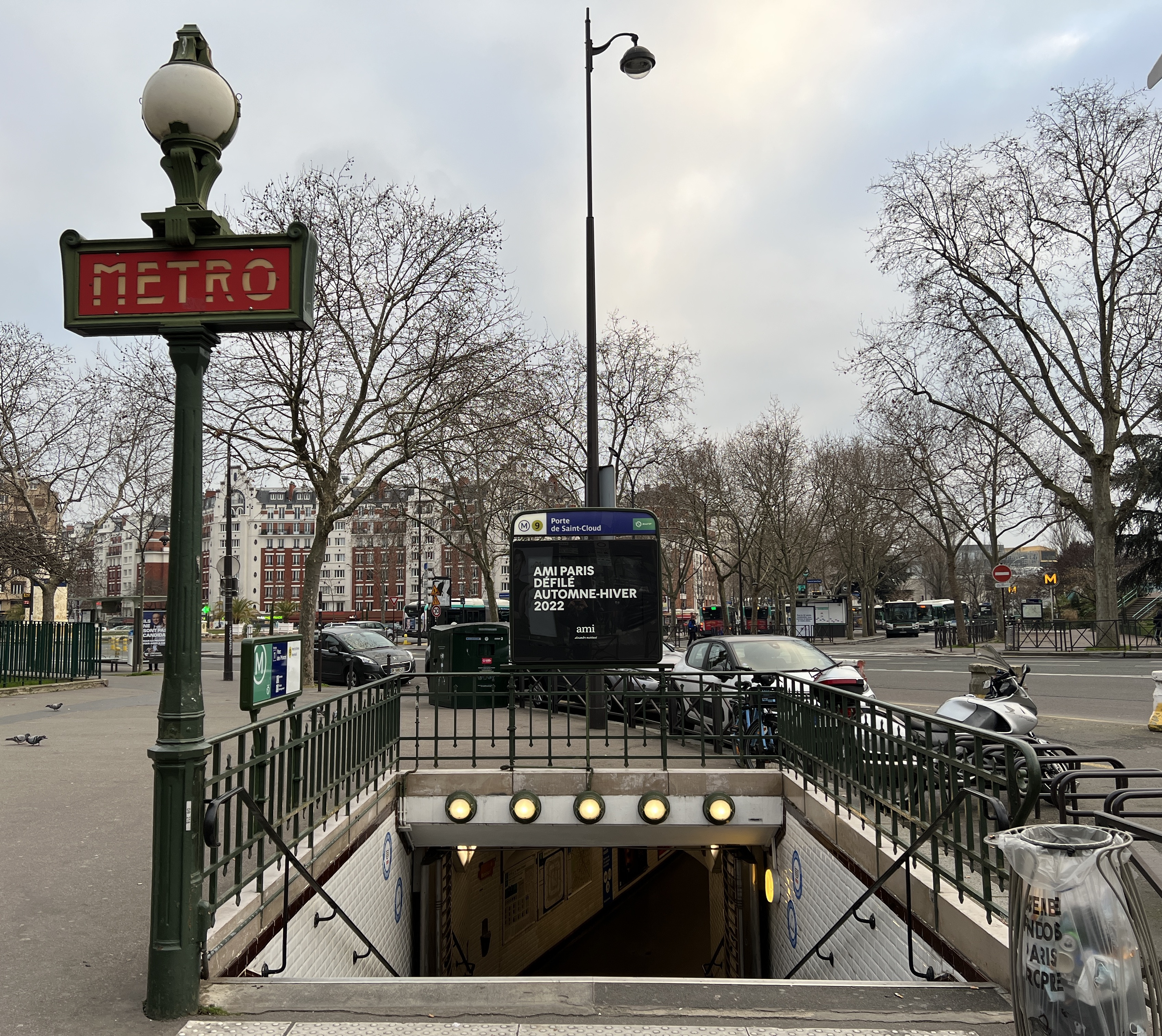
Access 1

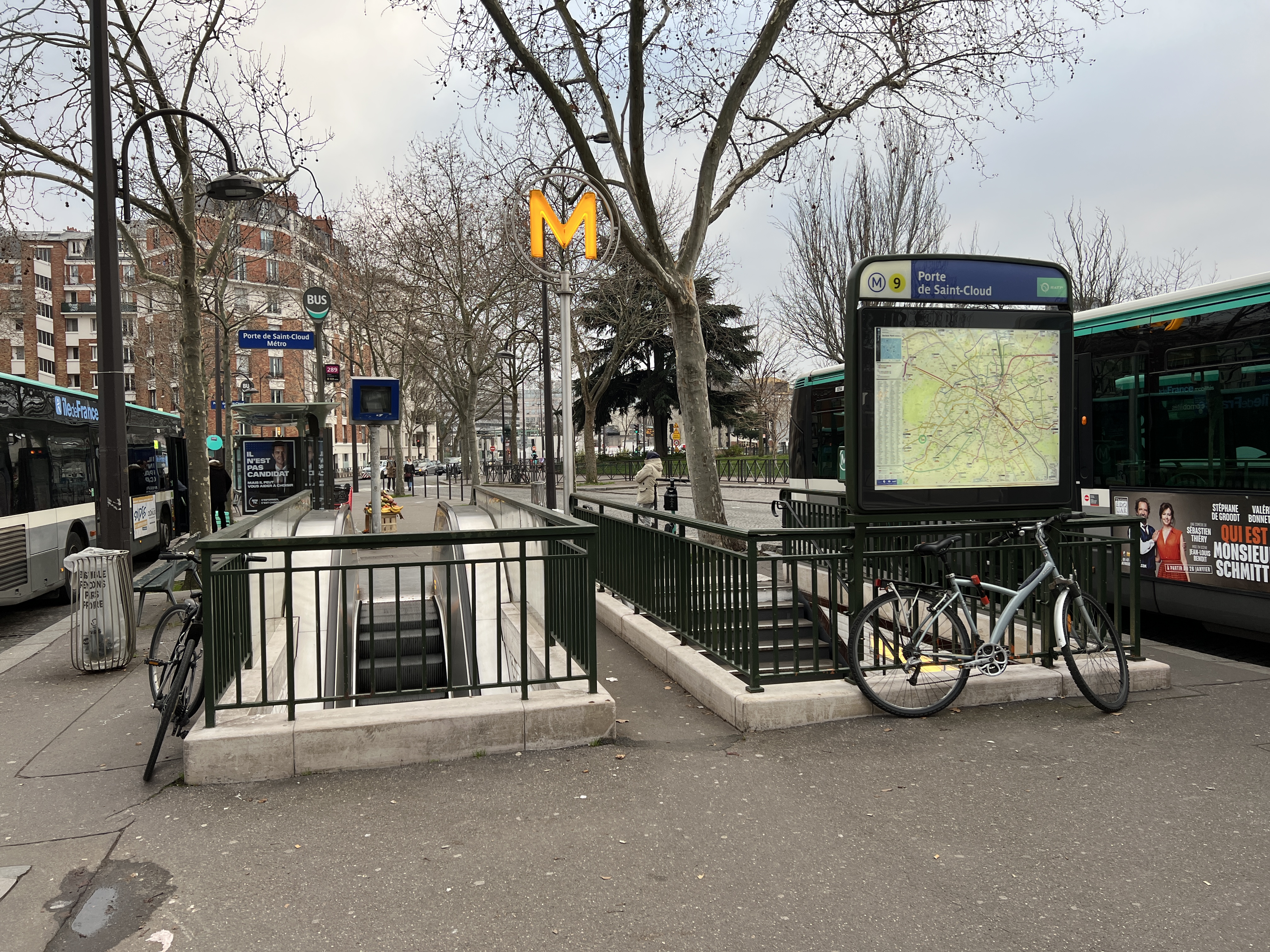
Access 2

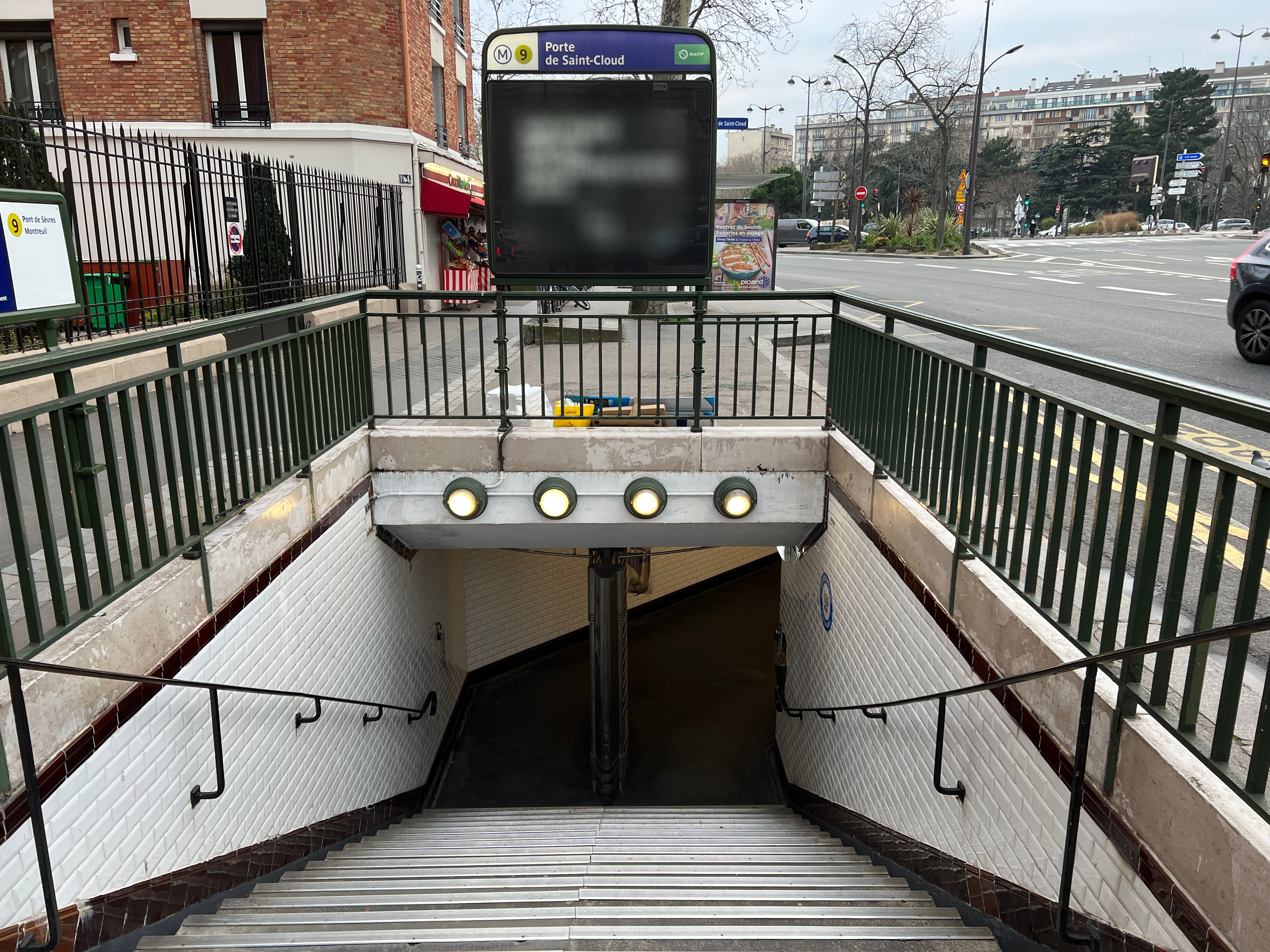
Access 3

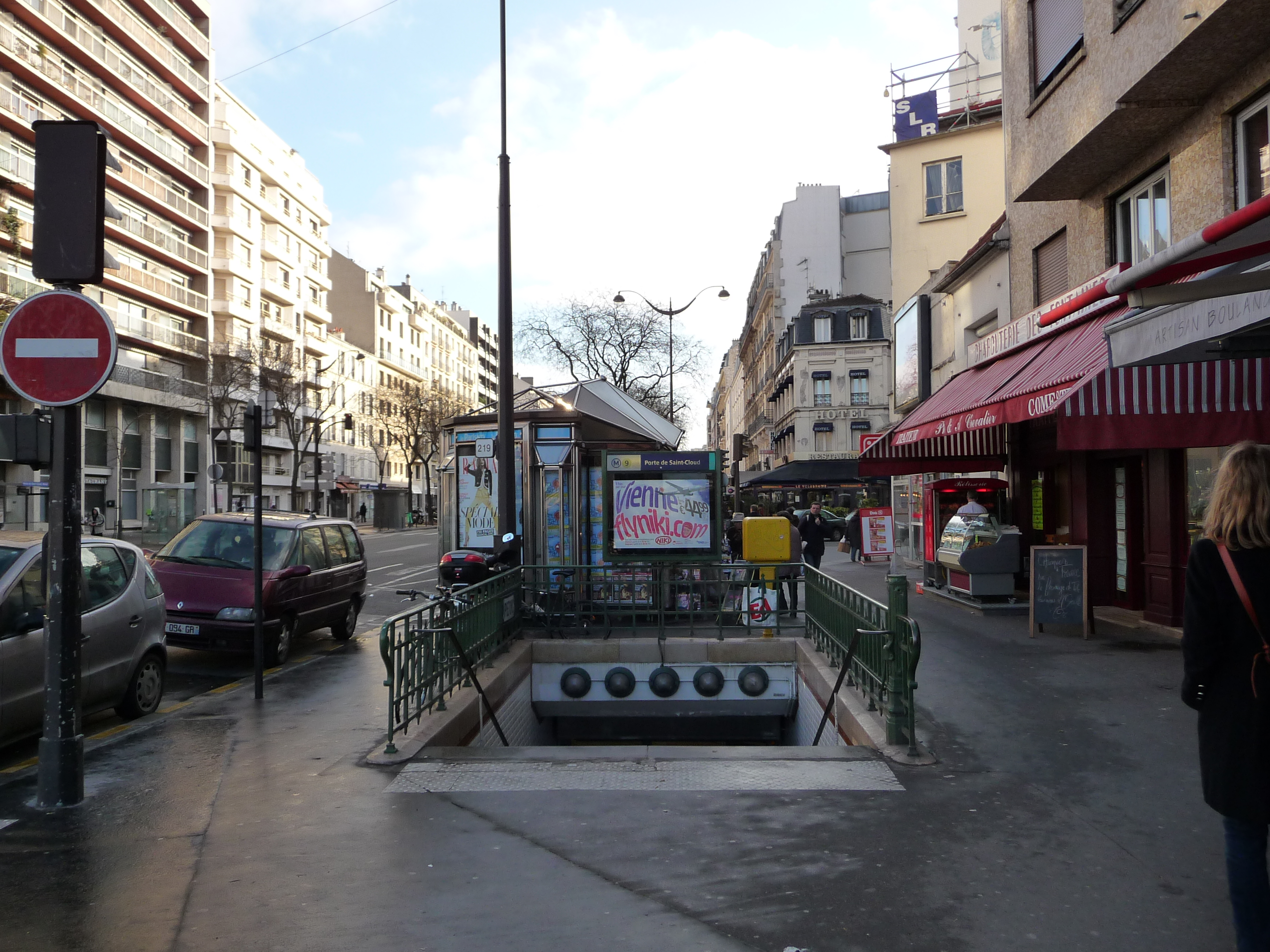
Access 4

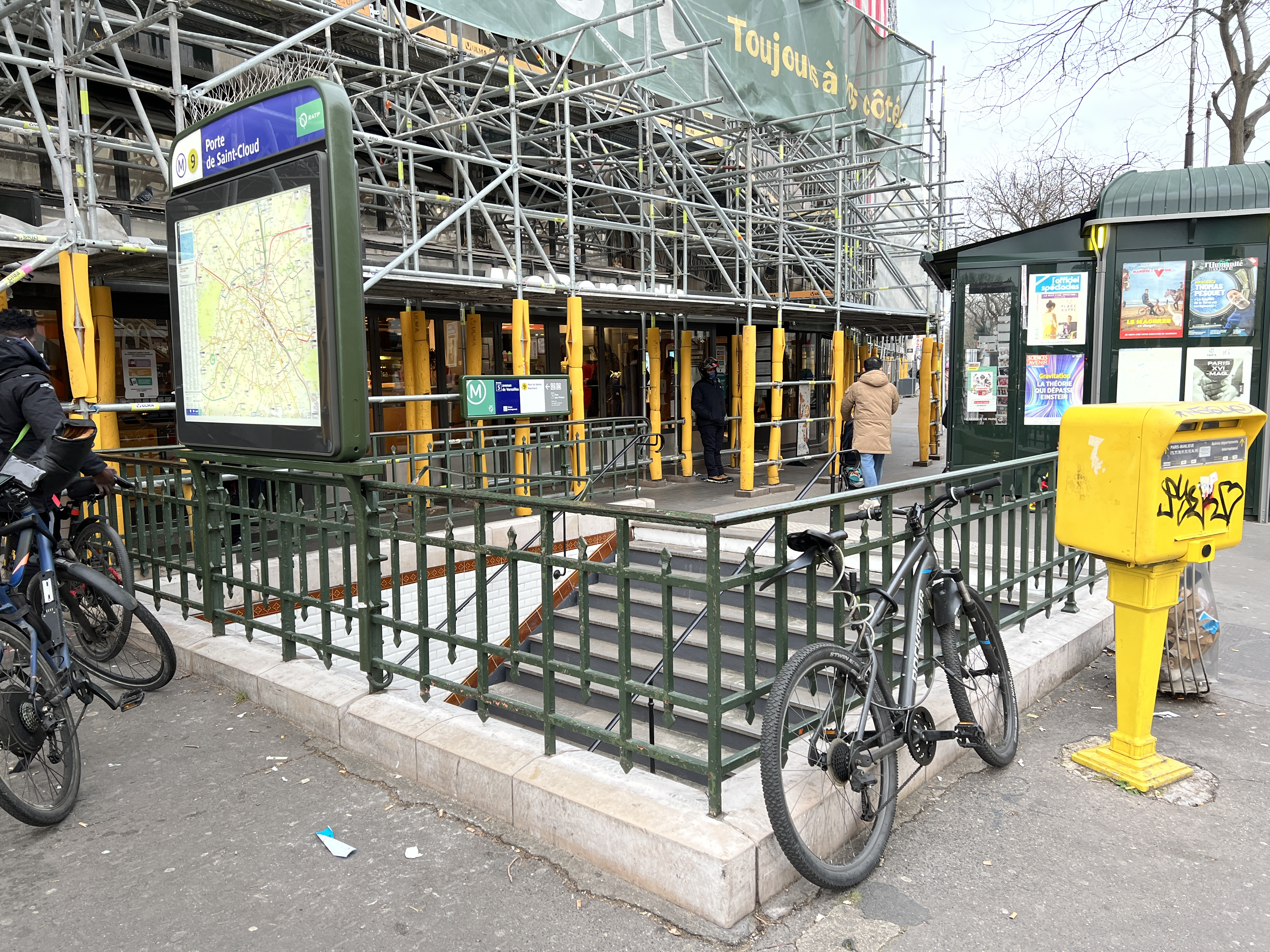
Access 5

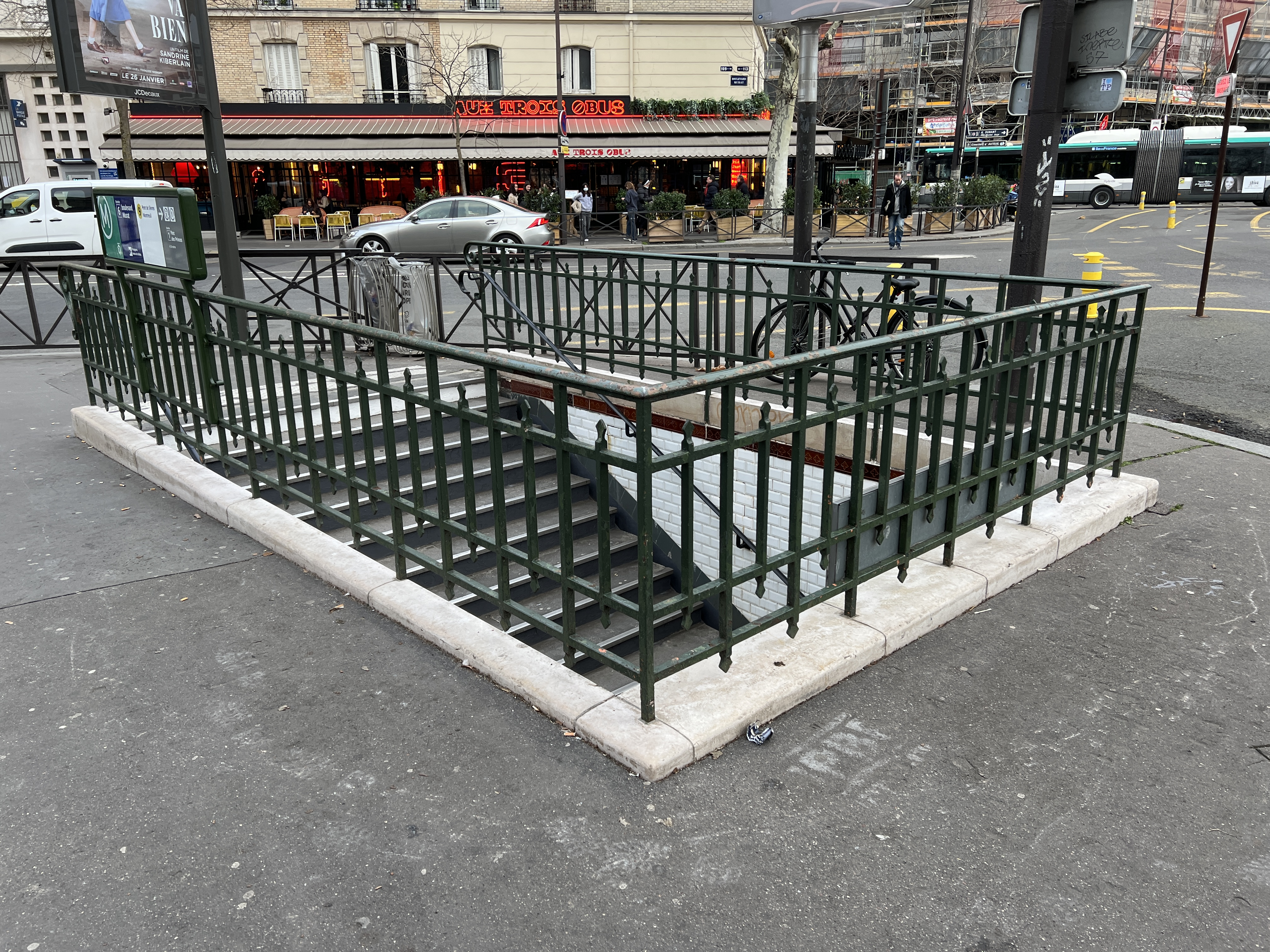
Access 6

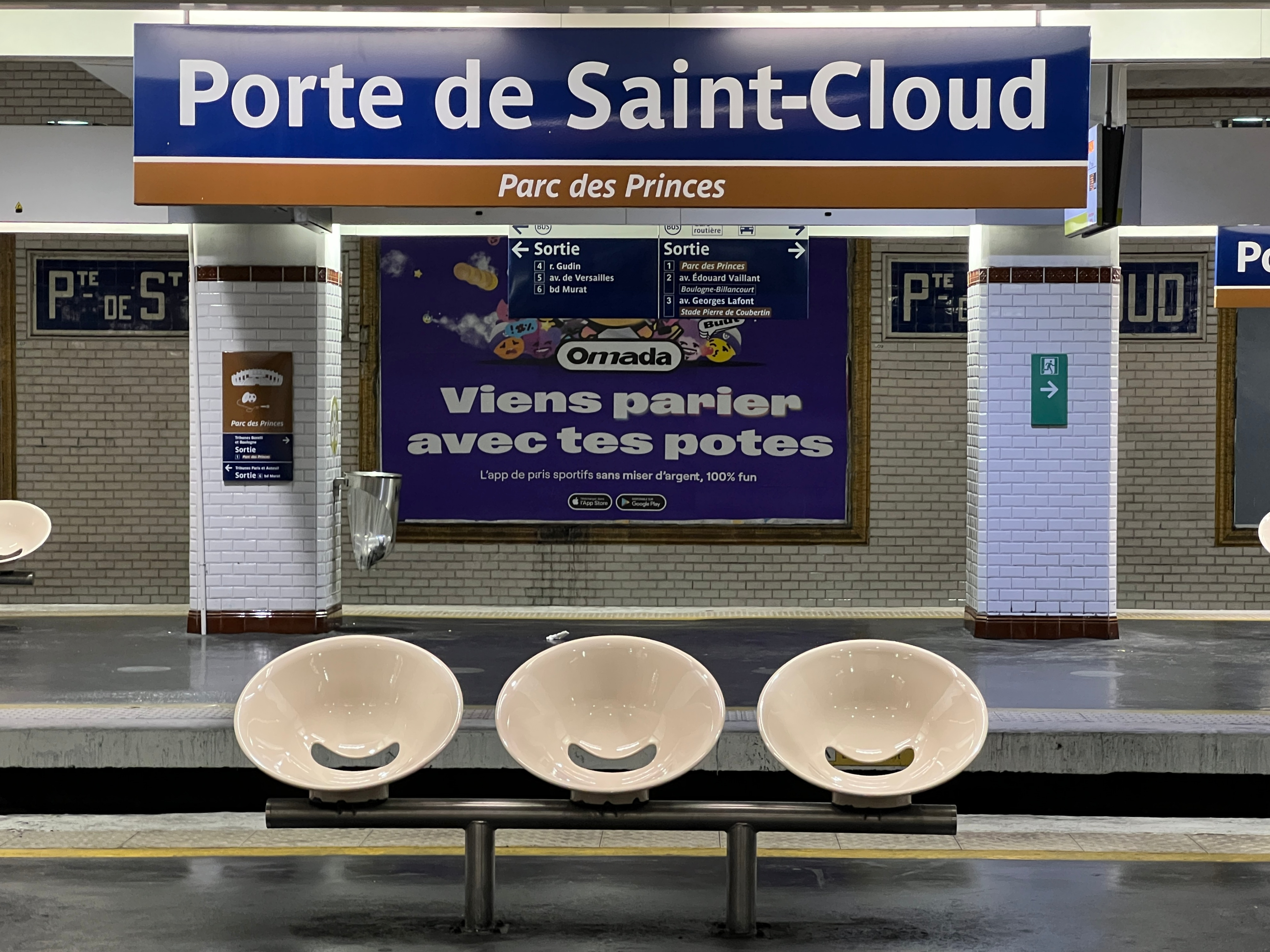
Station signboard
