= Georgette Agutte =

French painter and sculptor (1867–1922)

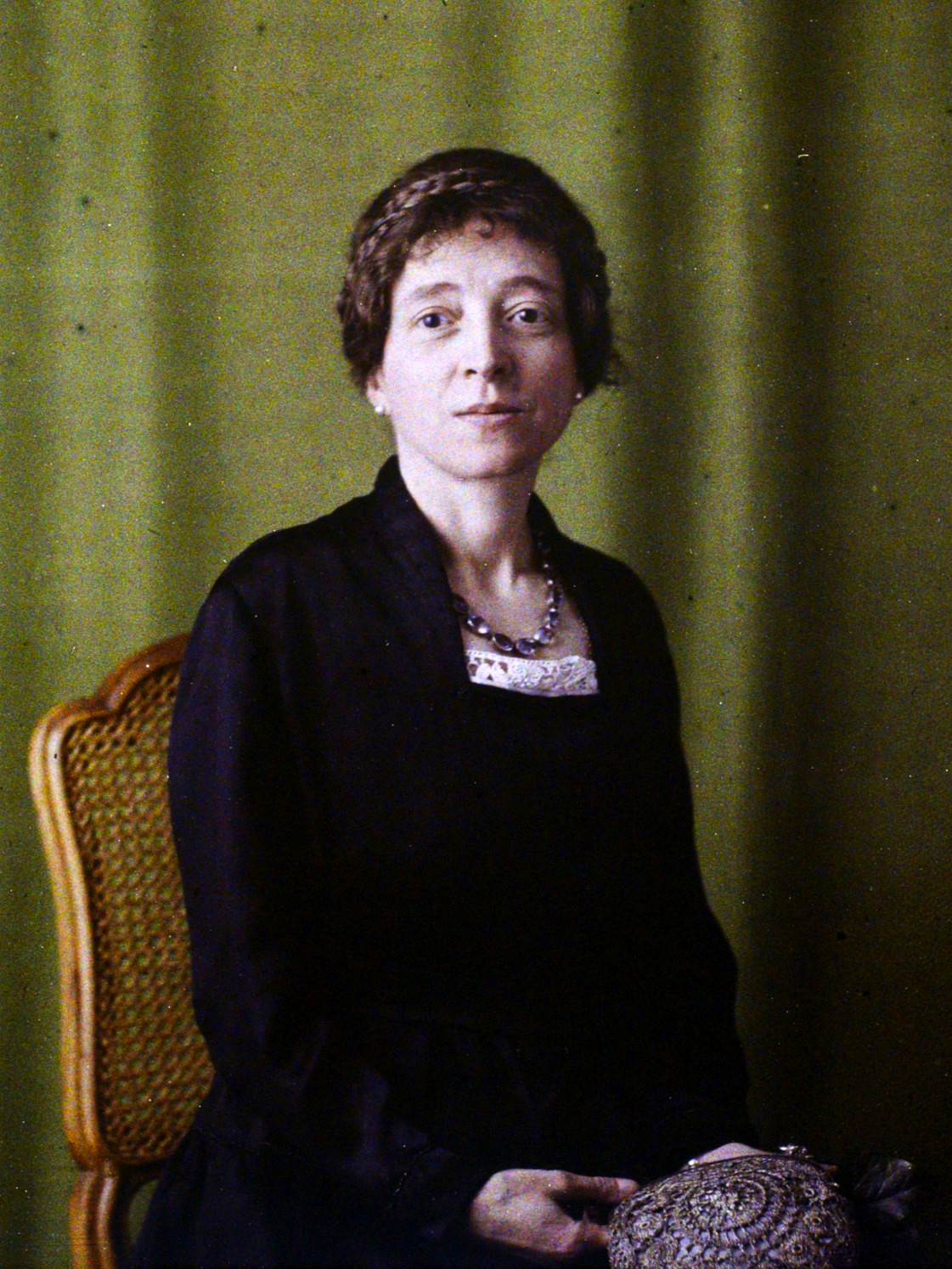
Autochrome portrait by Auguste Léon, 1921

Georgette Agutte (17 May 1867 – 5 September 1922) was a French painter.

== Biography ==
She was born in Calais. Her father was Jean Georges Agutte. In 1893 she joined Gustave Moreau's classes as a free pupil, and retained his teachings on the freedom of mind and independence. She also met Matisse and Georges Rouault among others.

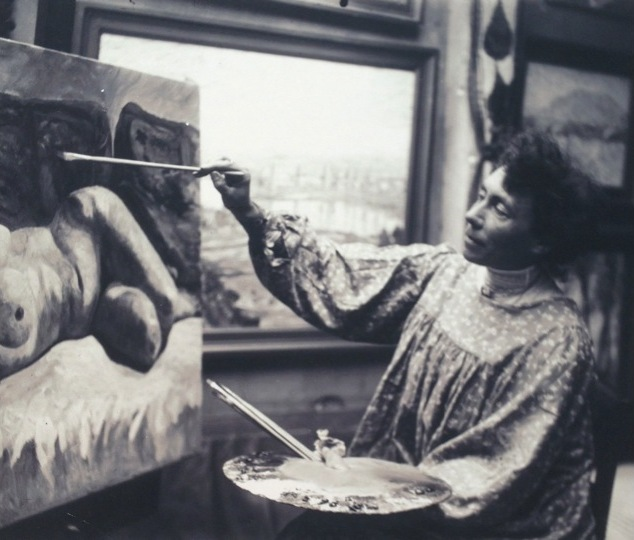
Georgette Agutte in her studio

Agutte was a non-conformist and the only woman to attend the École nationale supérieure des Beaux-Arts. She was a member of the Fauvist movement and a sculptor. Her studio was in Bonnières-sur-Seine. In 1888, she married the critic Paul Flat. After divorcing in 1894, she married socialist politician and art collector Marcel Sembat in 1897. From 1904 on, she exhibited at the Salon des Indépendants and participated in the Salon d'Automne.

After her husband's death from a cerebral hemorrhage, she wrote on a note: "Voilà douze heures qu’il est parti. Je suis en retard" (He left 12 hours ago, I'm late) and committed suicide with a broken wine bottle, dying in Chamonix on 5 September 1922. Knowing the importance of their art collection, the Musee de Grenoble's curator Andry-Farcy made every effort to obtain it. The museum holds most of her works and presented a retrospective at the end of December 2003.

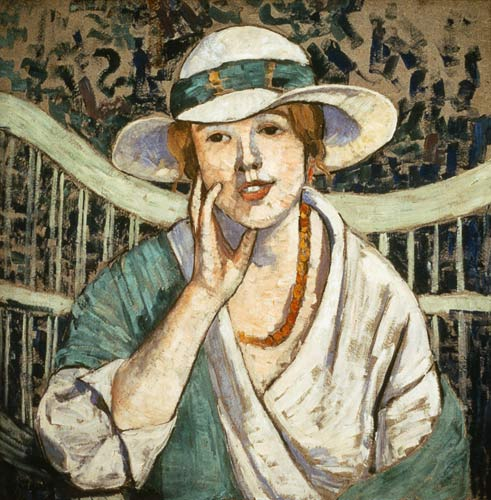
Georgette Agutte, The White and Green Hat (1914), Musée de Grenoble

A street is named after her in the 18th arrondissement of Paris, and a boulevard jointly for her and Sembat in Grenoble.

== Tapestry ==
She supplied several models to the Aubusson National School of Decorative Art. A mountain landscape woven by her was exhibited at the Salon des Artistes Décorateurs in 1922. At the International Exhibition of Decorative Arts held in Paris in 1925, the Aubusson National School of Decorative Art presented Georgette's fireplace screen with a bunch of marigolds and Aubusson tapestry that was woven in 1924, as well as mounted on a wood on its stand at the Grand Palais.

== Sculpture ==
Georgette Agutte sculpted the Monument to Jules Guesde, inaugurated in 1925 in Roubaix.

== Gallery ==
Works by Georgette Agutte

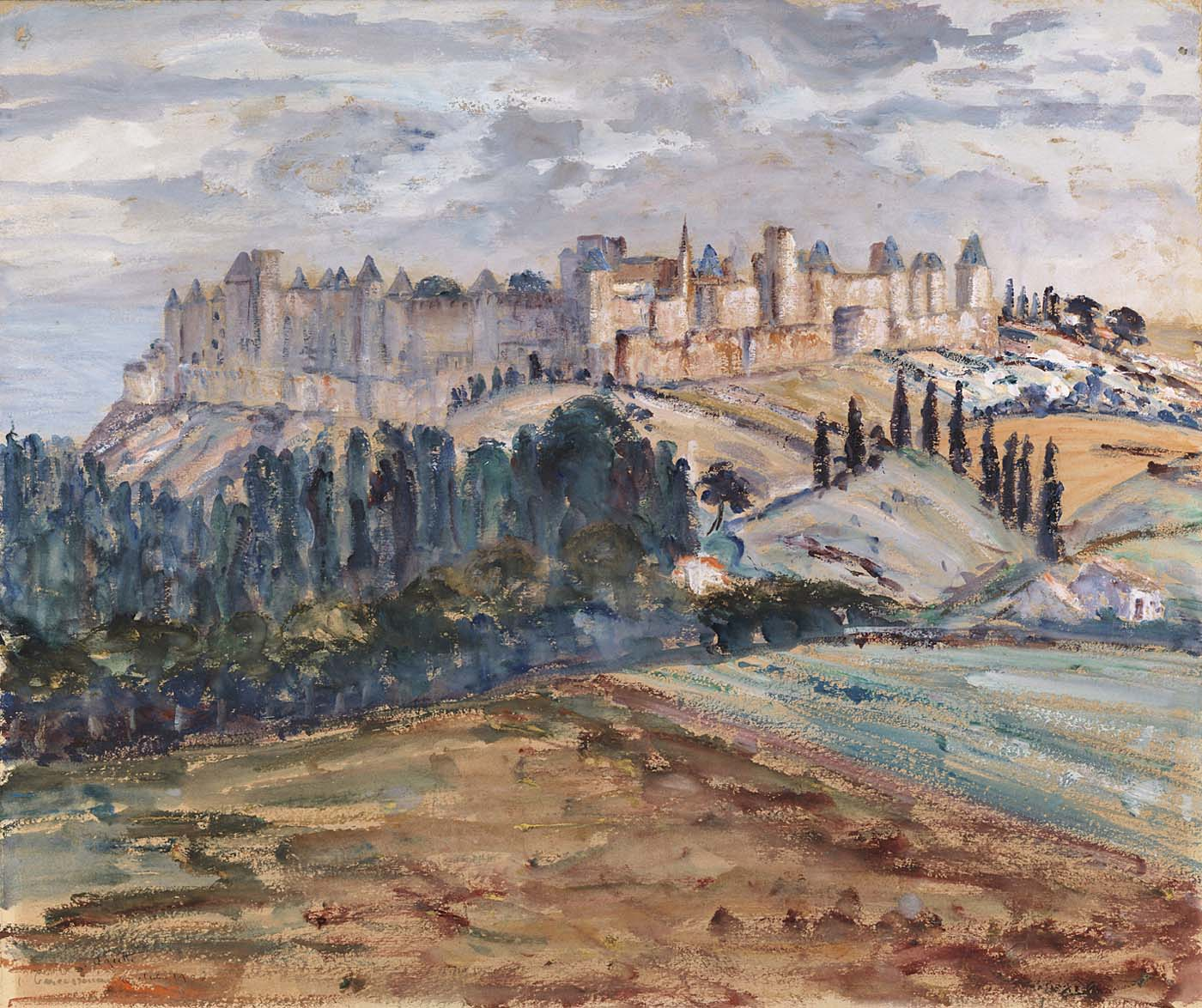
Château fort (1903), Washington, Smithsonian American Art Museum

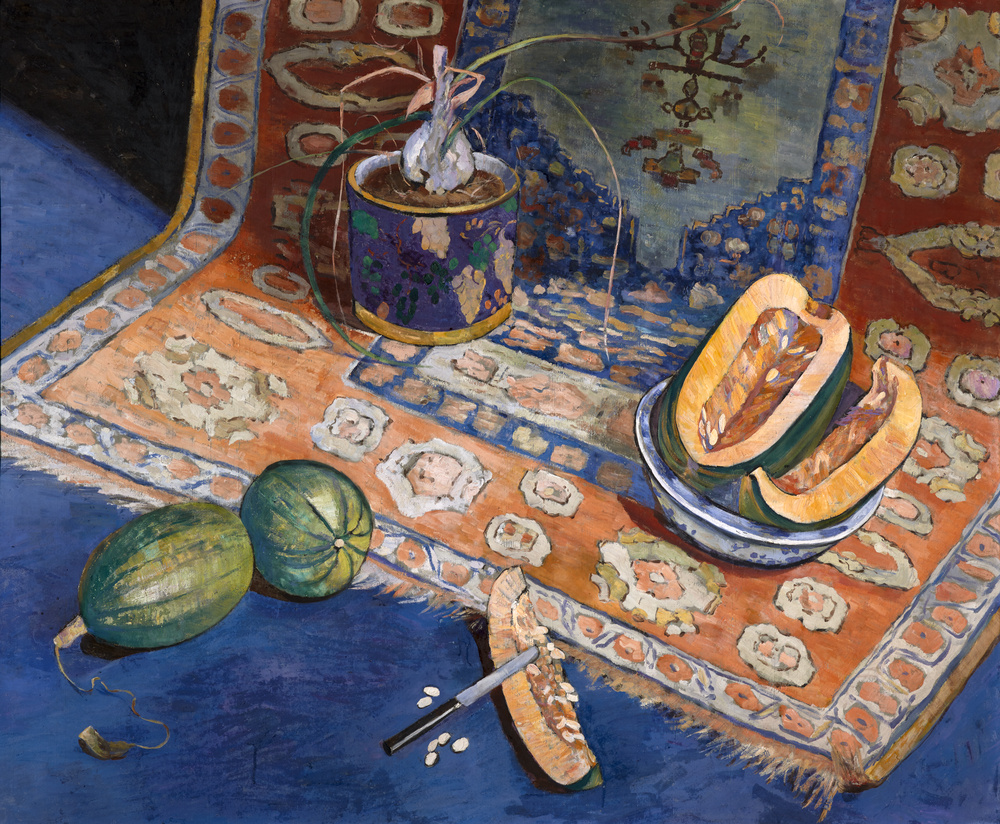
Nature morte aux pastèques, vase et tapis (1912-1914), Musée de Grenoble

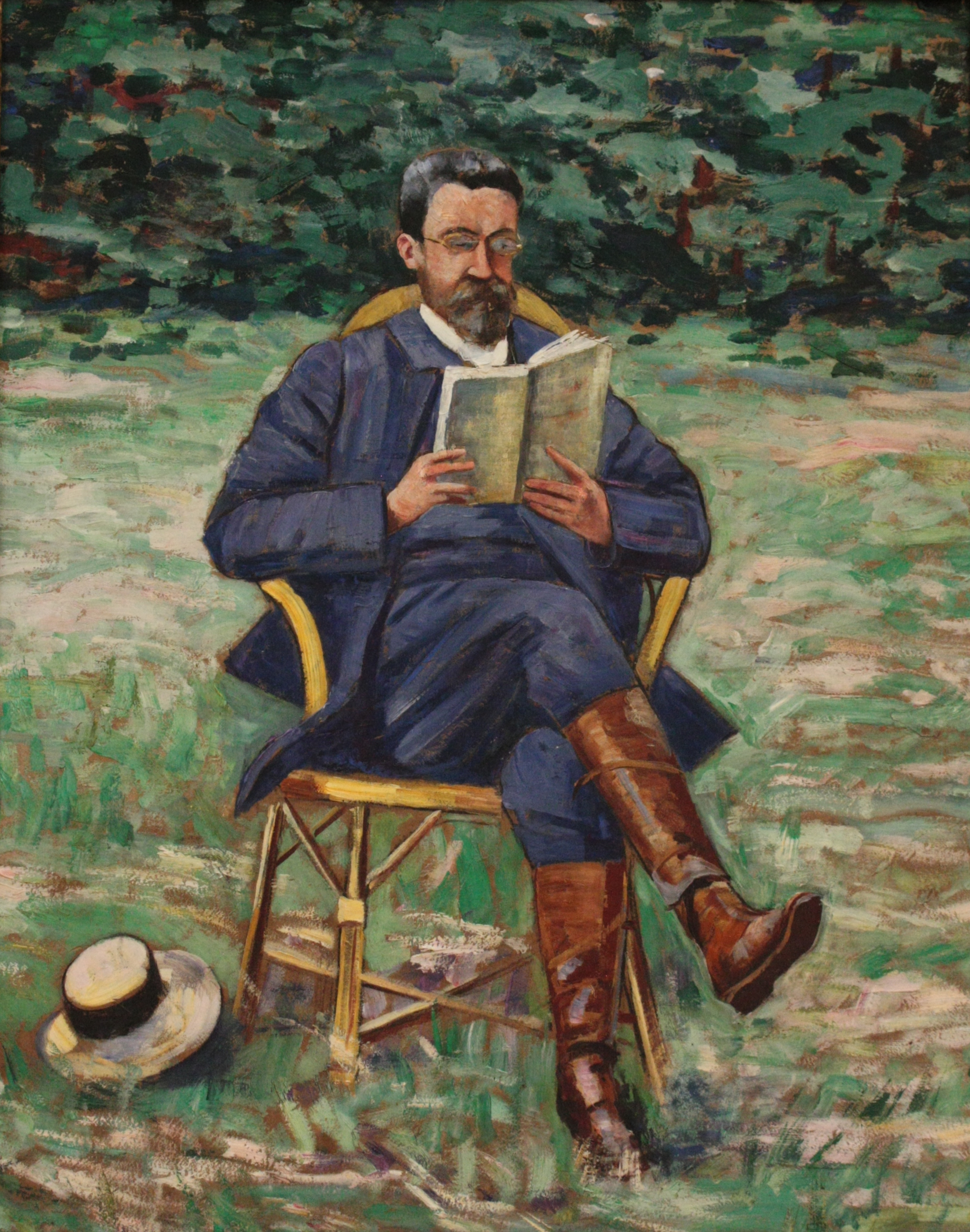
Marcel Sembat lisant, Musée de Grenoble.
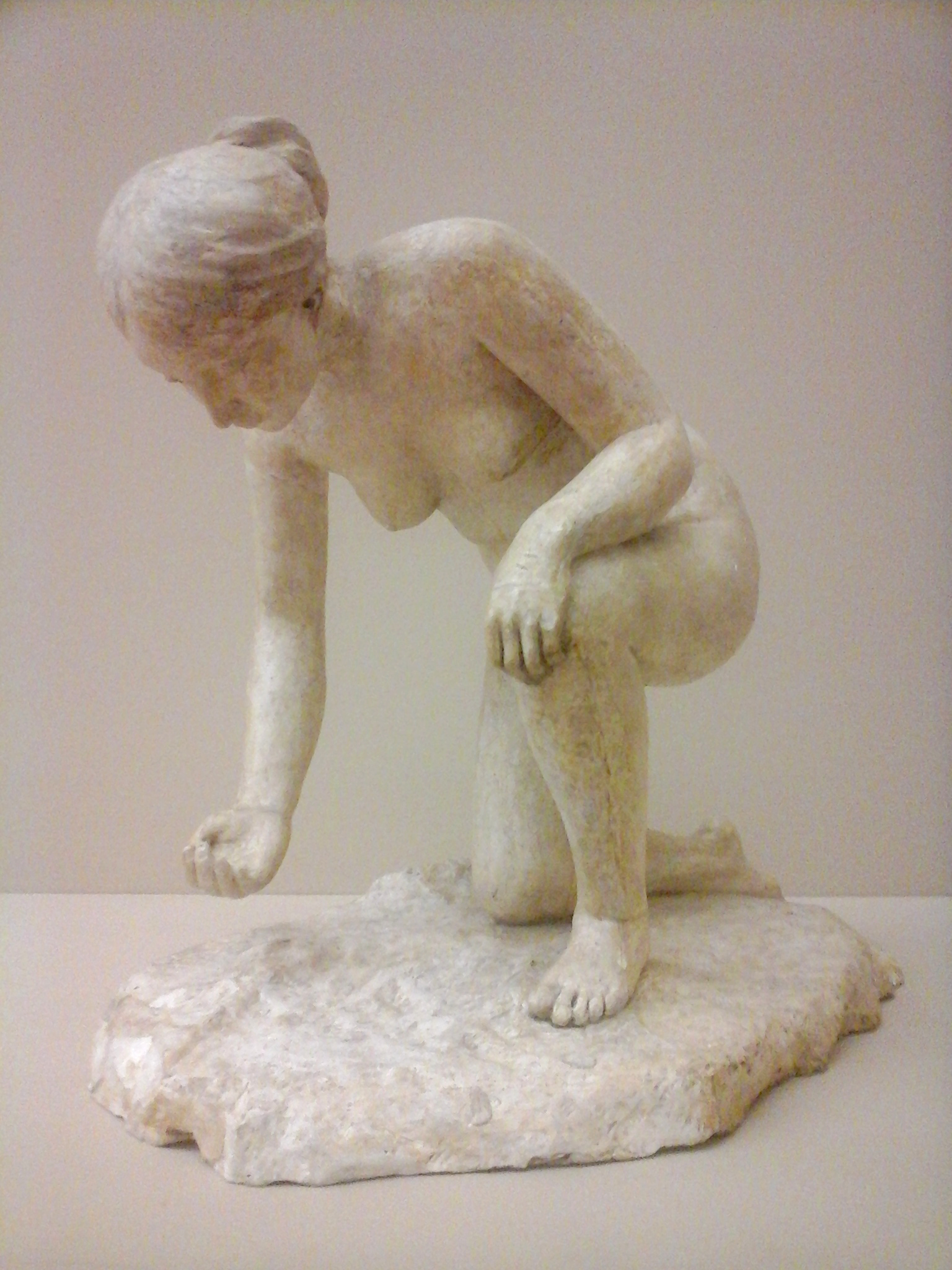
La Source (1902), Musée de Grenoble

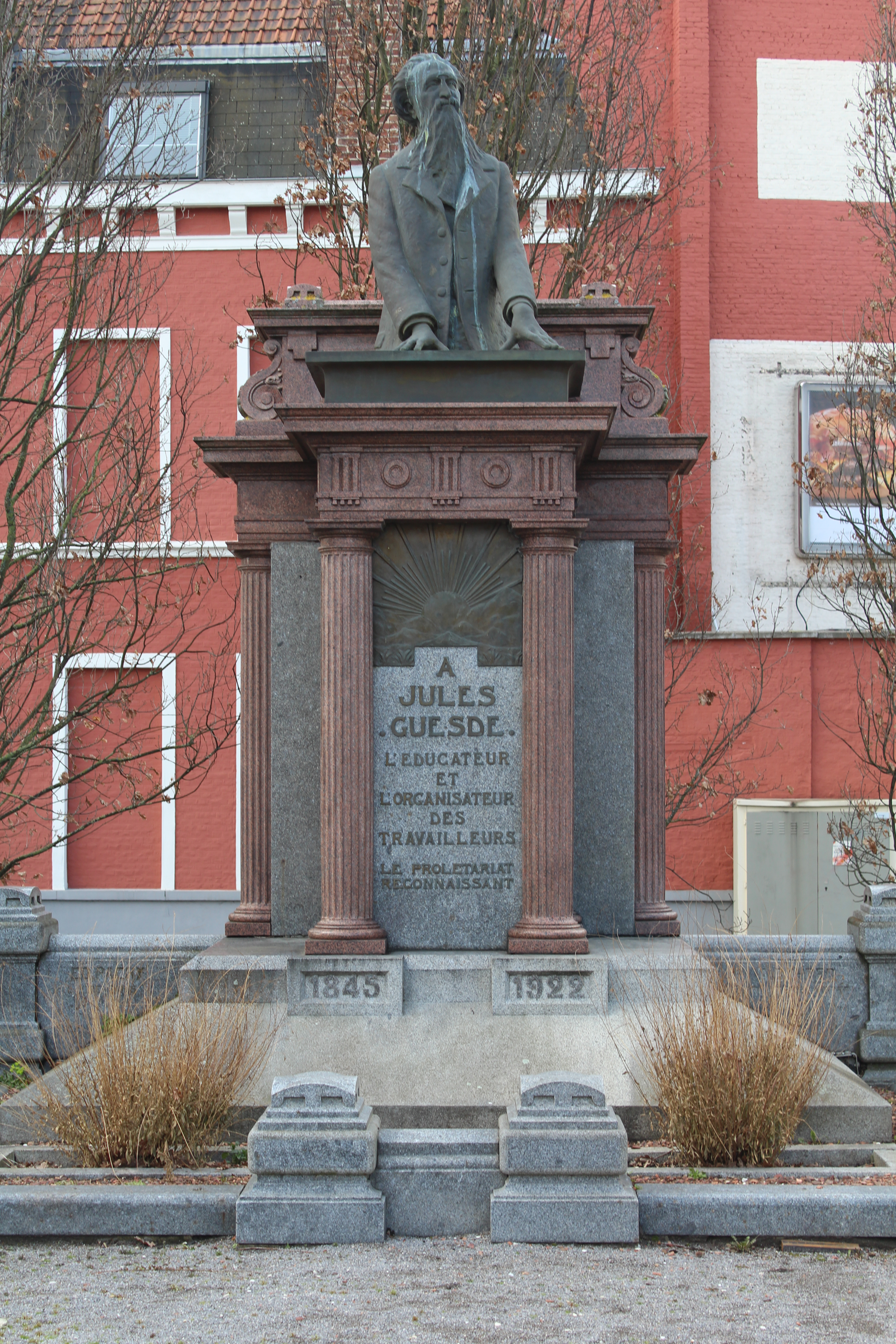
Monument à Jules Guesde (1925), Roubaix
