= Paris in the Middle Ages =

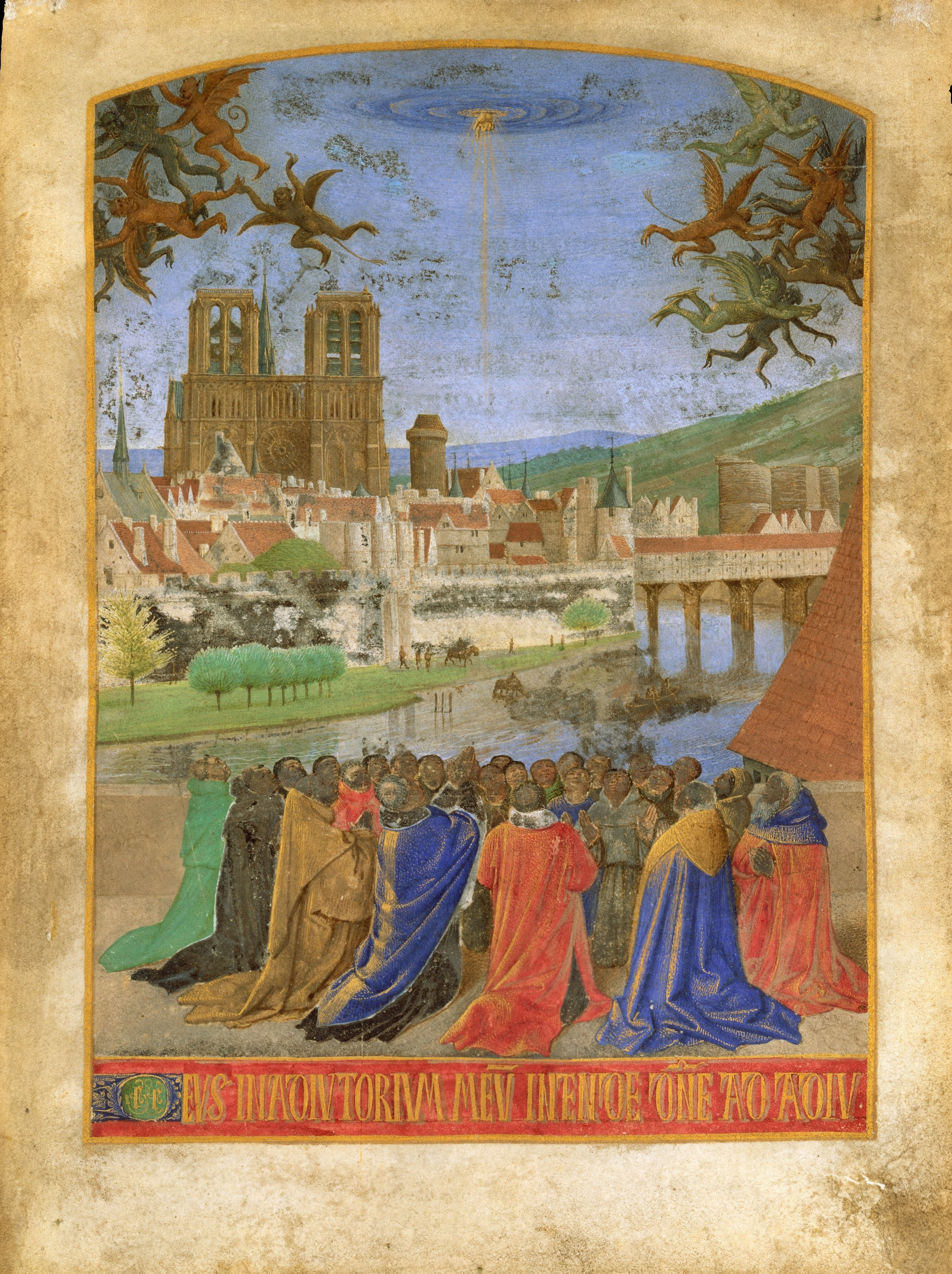
An illustration by Jean Fouquet from about 1450 that depicts the cathedral of Notre-Dame with the rest of Paris in the background

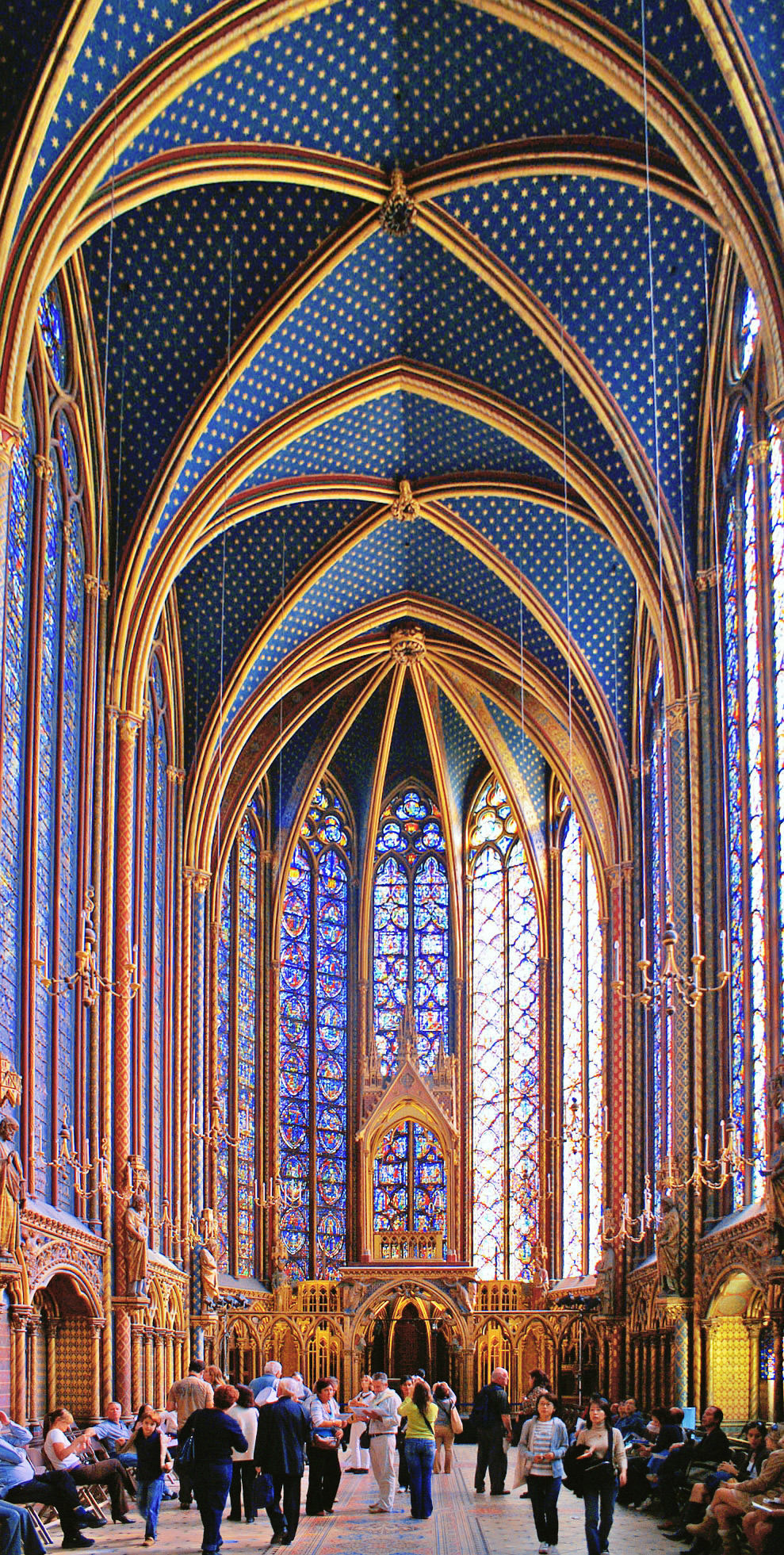
The Sainte-Chapelle was the chapel of the royal palace on the Île de la Cité, built in the 13th century

In the 10th century Paris was a provincial cathedral city of little political or economic significance, but under the kings of the Capetian dynasty who ruled France between 987 and 1328, it developed into an important commercial and religious center and the seat of the royal administration of the country. The Île de la Cité became the site of the royal palace and the new cathedral of Notre-Dame, begun in 1163. The Left Bank was occupied by important monasteries, including the Abbey of Saint-Germain-des-Prés and the Abbey of St Genevieve. In the late 12th century, the collection of colleges on the left bank became one of the leading universities in Europe. The Right Bank, where the ports, central markets, artisans and merchants were located, became the commercial center of the city, and the merchants assumed an important role in running the city. Paris became a center for the creation of illuminated manuscripts and the birthplace of Gothic architecture. Despite civil wars, the plague, and foreign occupation, Paris became the most populous city in the Western world during the Middle Ages.

== Geography ==
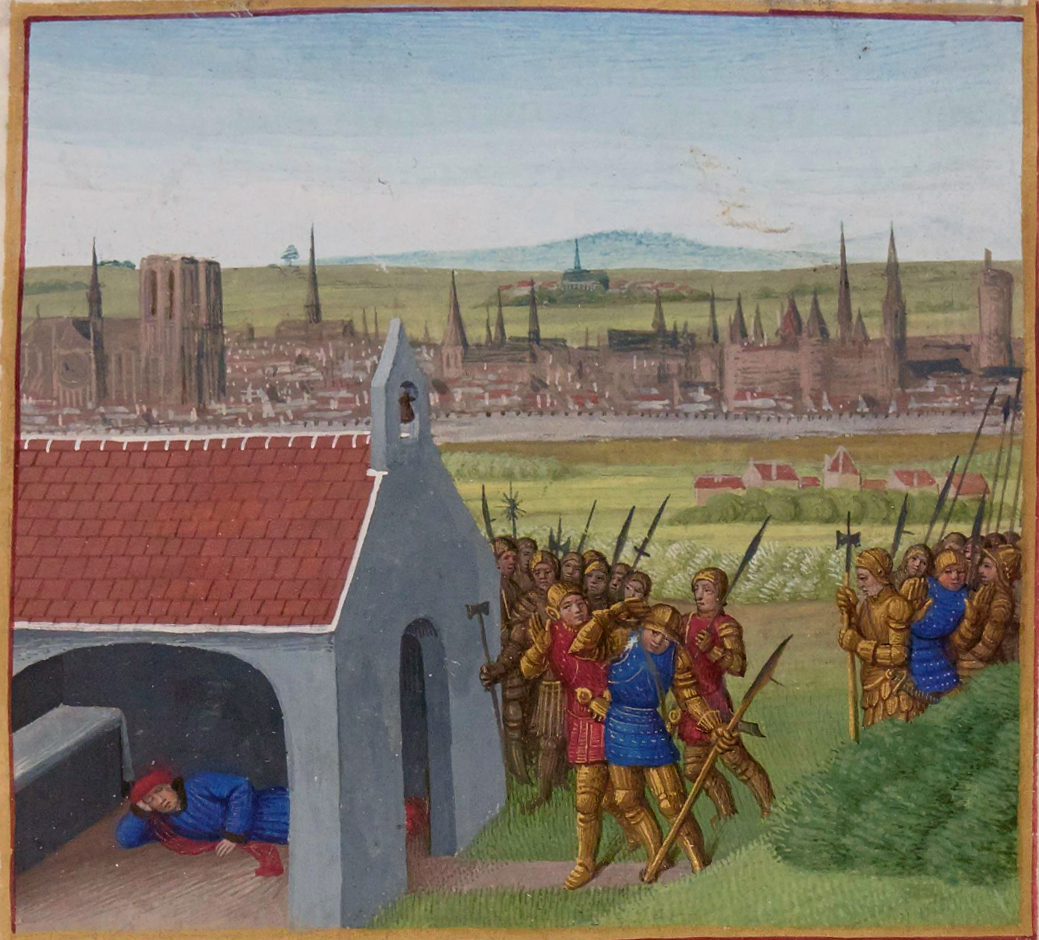
A view of Paris from Saint-Denis as depicted about 1455 by Jean Fouquet.

The location of Paris was an important factor in its growth and strategic importance during the Middle Ages. Due to its position at the confluence of the Seine and the rivers Oise, Marne and Yerres, the city was abundantly supplied with food from the surrounding region, which was rich in grain fields and vineyards. The rivers also offered access for trading by boat with other cities in France and locations as far away as Spain and Germany. The Seine, without its stone embankments, was about twice as wide as it is today, and a tributary, the river Bièvre, entered the Seine about where the Jardin des Plantes is today. The largest island in the river, the Île de la Cité ("Island of the City"), was the easiest place to build bridges across the Seine; it became the crossing point on the important north-south trade route between Orléans and Flanders. The island was also the easiest place to defend; it gave the Parisians a sanctuary when the city was attacked by the Huns in the 5th century and Vikings in the 9th century. The Roman prefects had built their residences on the west end of the island; the first royal palace was built on the same site in the early Middle Ages. The first cathedral and the residence of the bishop were built on the east end of the island at about the same time.

The Romans had built their city on the Left Bank, because it was of higher elevation and less prone to flood; the forum was located on a hill about 60 metres (200 ft) high, later called the Montagne Sainte-Geneviève after the patron saint of the city. In the early Middle Ages, the hill became the site of two important monasteries, the Abbey of Saint-Victor and the Abbey of St Genevieve, while another large and prosperous monastery, the Abbey of Saint-Germain-des-Prés, was built in the fields along the Seine farther west. In the Middle Ages, the monasteries attracted thousands of scholars and students who formed colleges that became the University of Paris in the beginning of the 13th century.

The Right Bank was swampy, but it was also the best place for landing boats. The gravel beach in which the Hôtel de Ville stands today became the port and the commercial center of the city, where the central market was located. The trade route from Orléans to Flanders passed between two large buttes on the Right Bank; the same route is followed today by the trains to Brussels and Amsterdam. The Romans probably built a temple to Mercury on the highest point at 130 metres (430 ft), which they called "Mount Mercury". It was the site of the martyrdom of Saint Denis and two other missionaries and thereafter was known as the "Mountain of Martyrs" or "Montmartre". During the Middle Ages, it lay outside the city walls, and was the site of a large convent and a pilgrimage church. During the course of the Middle Ages, the swampy land on the Right Bank was filled in and most of the city's growth took place there. This geographic distribution, with the administration and the courts on the island, the merchants on the Right Bank, and the University on the Left Bank, remained largely the same throughout the history of the city down to the present day.

== Population ==
Paris in 1380

There are no reliable figures for the population of Paris from before 1328, when an official count was made of the number of parishes in the kingdom of France and the number of feux, or households, in each parish. Paris was reported to contain thirty-five parishes and 61,098 households: estimating three and a half people per household, the population of the city would have been at least two hundred thousand persons. Other historians, using the same data, have estimated the population at between 220,000 and 270,000.

The bubonic plague struck Paris for the first time in 1348 and returned frequently. Due to the plague and the outbreak of the Armagnac–Burgundian Civil War in 1407, the population fell to about one hundred thousand by 1422. Following the end of the wars, the population increased quickly; by 1500, the population had reached about 150,000.

In the Middle Ages, Paris was already attracting immigrants from the provinces of France and other countries of Europe. A study of the names in the Livres des Tailles, or parish records, between 1292 and 1313 showed 155 persons listed as L’Anglois (an Englishman); 144 called Le Breton (a Breton), plus forty-seven from Burgundy, forty-four from Normandy, forty-two from Picardy, thirty four from Flanders, and twenty-eight from Lorraine. In addition, there were many more from the cities and towns of the Paris basin.

=== The city walls ===
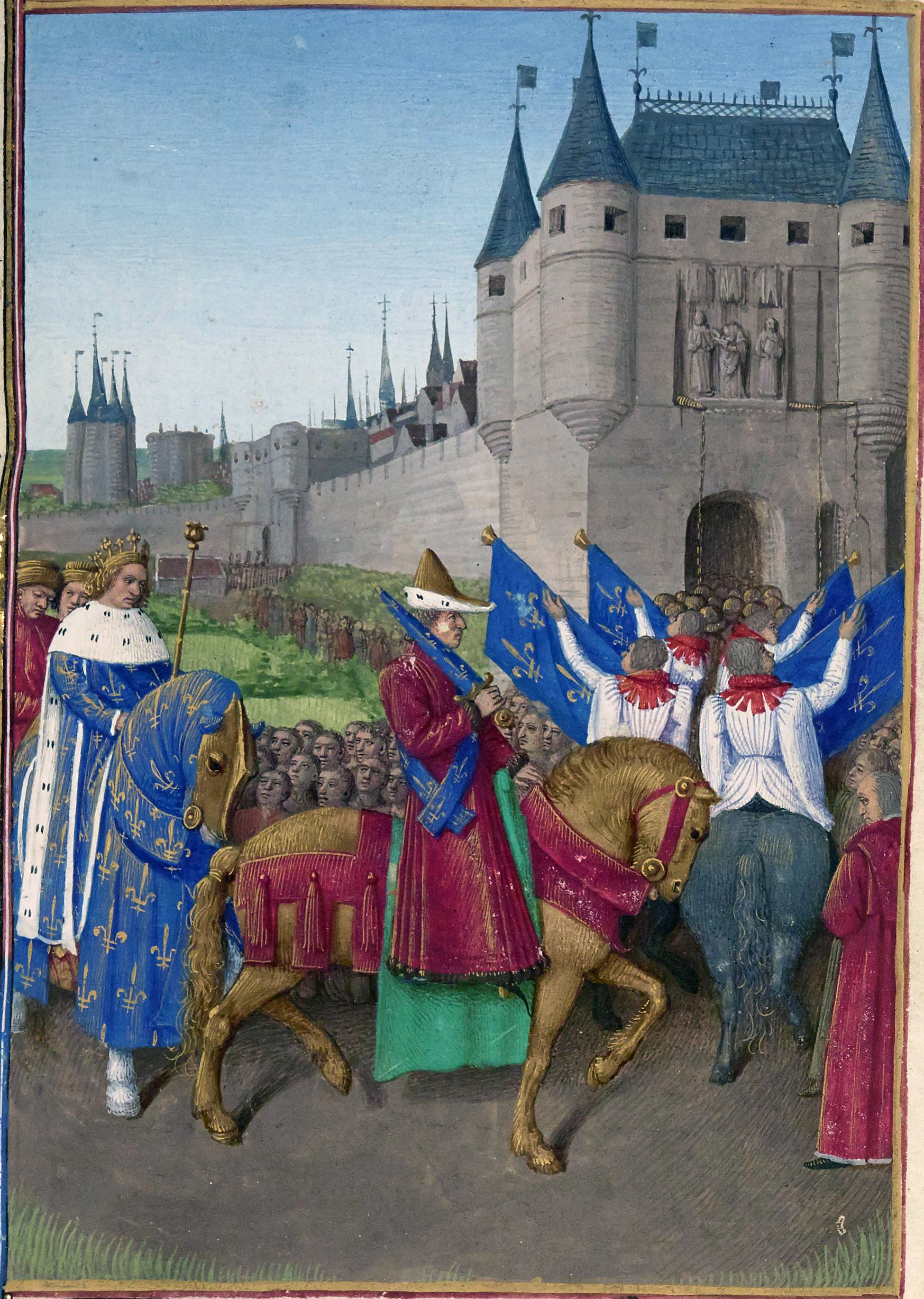
King Charles V enters the gates of Paris in 1358 in an illustration of ca. 1455–1460 by Jean Fouquet in the Grandes Chroniques de France

The borders of Paris were defined in the Middle Ages by a series of walls. During the Merovingian era of Frankish rule (481–751 AD), the Île de la Cité had ramparts, and some of the monasteries and churches were protected by wooden stockades walls, but the residents of the Left and Right Banks were largely undefended. When Vikings and other invaders attacked, the residents of Paris took sanctuary on the island. The first city wall was built on the Right Bank in the 11th century; it was about 1,700 meters long and protected an area of the Right Bank from about the modern Hôtel de Ville to the Louvre. It had about thirty towers and four to six gates. The much smaller population of the Left Bank was unprotected.

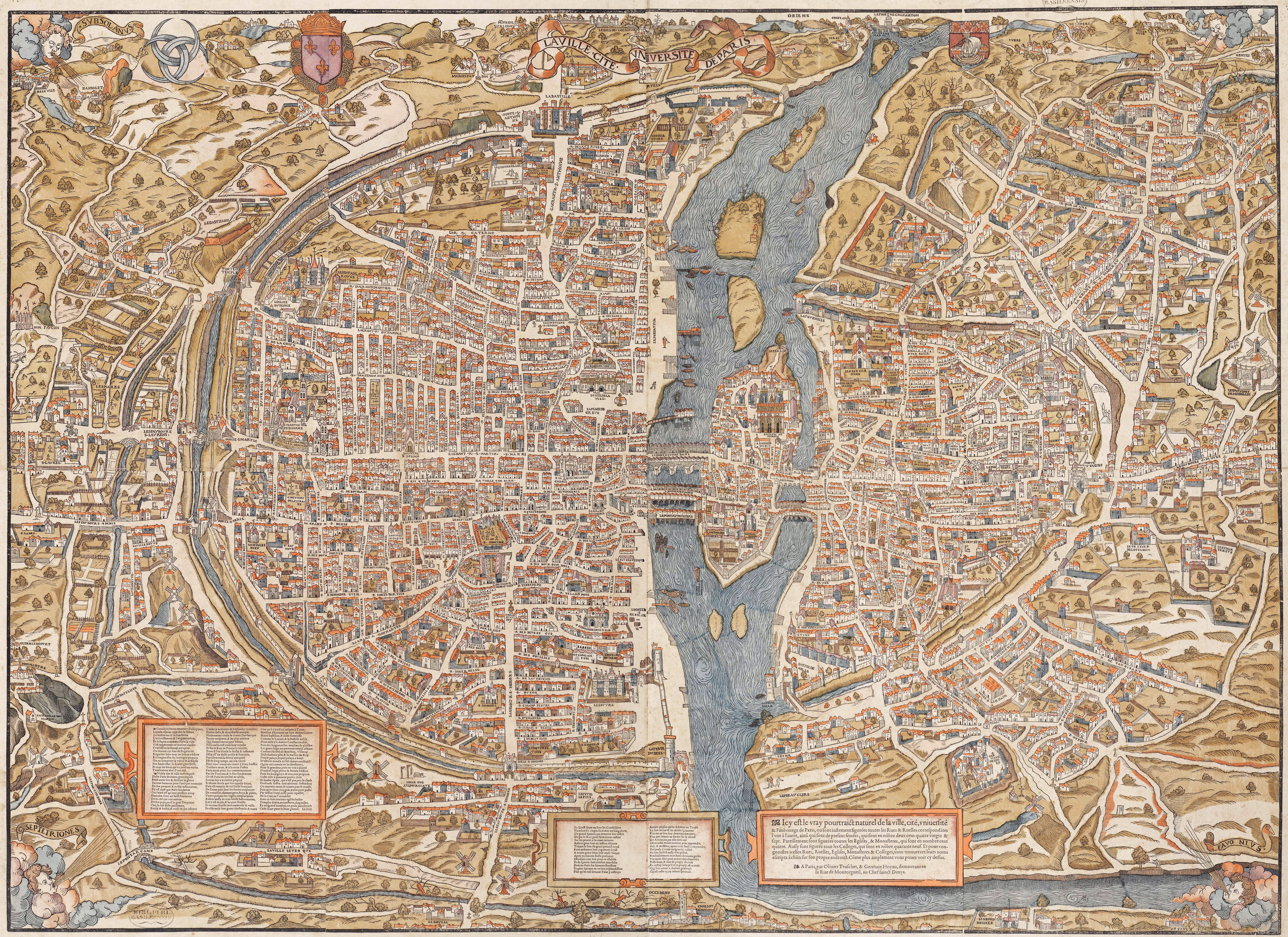
A map of Paris published in 1553 by Olivier Truschet and Germain Hoyau. It documents the growth of Paris within its medieval walls and the faubourgs beyond the walls.

By 1180, the city had grown to 200 hectares. To give all Parisians a sense of security, King Philip II decided to build a new wall entirely around the city. Work began between 1190 and 1208 on the Right Bank and 1209 and 1220 on the Left Bank. The new wall was 5,400 meters long (2,800 on the Right Bank and 2,600 on the Left Bank), with ten gates and seventy-five towers, and surrounded about 273 hectares, including much land that was still gardens and pastures. Portions of this wall can still be seen in the Le Marais district and other neighborhoods today.

The city continued to grow rapidly, particularly on the Right Bank to fill in the vacant tracts within the new wall and spill beyond it. Between 1358 and 1371, Charles V built another new wall 4,900 meters long to enclose 439 hectares. Most of this wall was on the Right Bank; on the slower-growing Left Bank, the king simply repaired the old wall of Philip II. This new wall included a powerful new fortress at the eastern edge of the city at the Porte Saint-Antoine called the Bastille. These walls were modified to make them more resistant to a new strategic weapon of the Middle Ages, the cannon, and no new walls were built until the 16th century.

As the city pressed against the city walls, it also grew vertically. The streets were very narrow, averaging only four meters wide. The average house in the 14th century had a ground floor, two floors of residential space, and another smaller residential space under the roof on the third floor, but there were also a large number of houses with four floors on the Rue Saint-Denis, the Rue Saint-Honoré and other streets, and a five-story house is recorded on the Rue des Poulies. Given that the area of Paris within the city walls in 1328 was 439 hectares, and the population was two hundred thousand, many of those counted probably lived outside the city walls. It remained very high in the heart of the city, except during times of war and the plague, until the reconstruction by Napoleon III and Haussmann in the mid-19th century.

== Royal Palaces in France ==
=== The Palais de la Cité ===
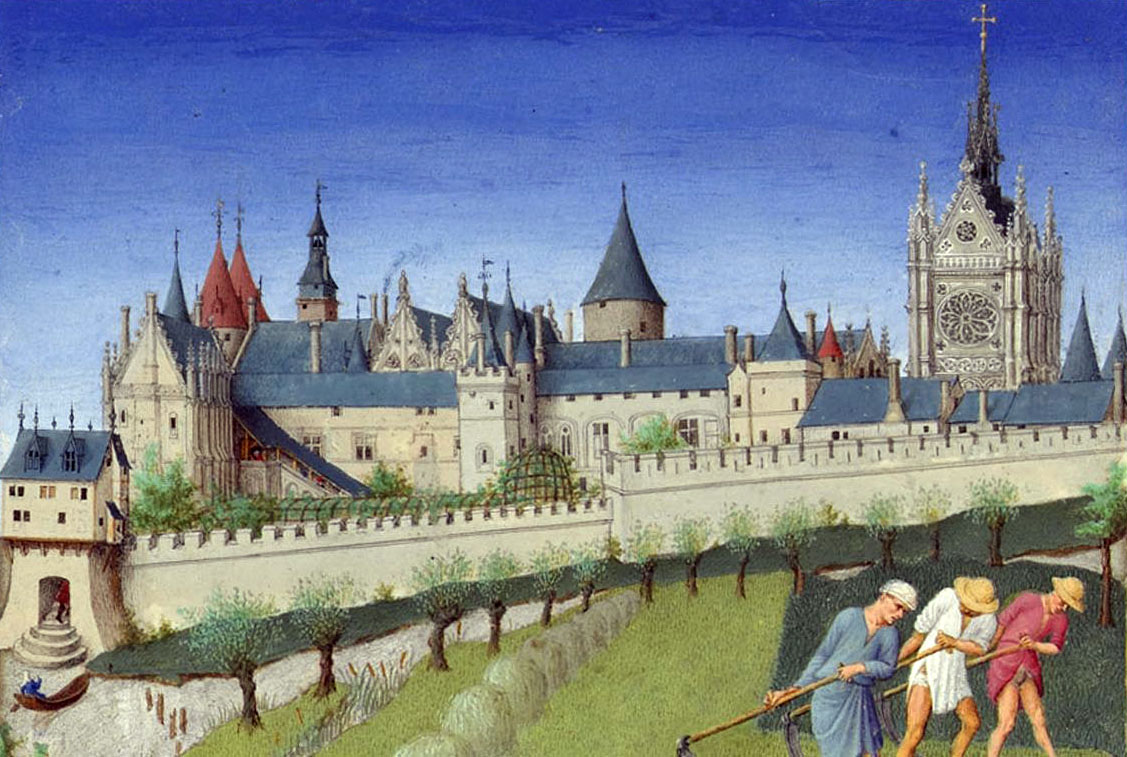
The Palais de la Cité and Sainte-Chapelle as viewed from the Left Bank, from the Les Très Riches Heures du duc de Berry (1410), month of June

The Roman governors of Lutetia (=Lutèce), the ancient predecessor of modern Paris, maintained their residence on the western end of the Île de la Cité, where the Palais de Justice stands today. A castle was built on the same site in the early Middle Ages. After Hugh Capet was elected King of the French on 3 July 987, he resided in this castle, but he and the other Capetian kings spent little time in the city, and had other royal residences in Vincennes, Compiegne and Orléans. The administration and archives of the kingdom travelled wherever the king went.

Robert the Pious, who ruled from 996 to 1031, stayed in Paris more often than his predecessors. He rebuilt the old castle, making it a walled rectangle 110 by 135 meters in size, with numerous towers and massive central tower, or donjon, and added a chapel named for Saint Nicholas. However, it was not until the 12th century and the reigns of Louis VI (1108–1137) and Louis VII of France (1137–1180) that Paris became the principal residence of the kings, and the term Palais de la Cité (or "Royal Palace") was commonly used. Philip II (1180–1223) placed the royal archives, the treasury and courts within the royal palace, and thereafter the city functioned, except for brief periods, as the capital of the kingdom of France.

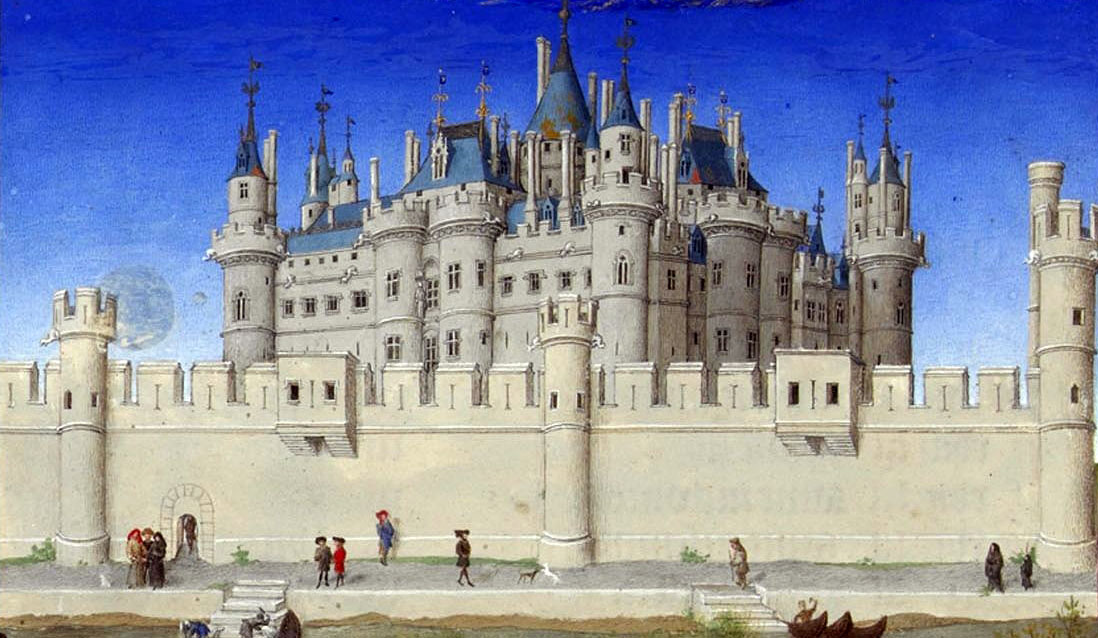
The fortress of the Louvre, begun in 1190, as it appeared in 1412–1416 in the Très Riches Heures du Duc de Berry, month of October

Louis IX, or Saint Louis, the grandson of Philip II, gave the palace a new symbol that combined royal and religious symbolism. Between 1242 and 1248, on the site of the old chapel, he built the Sainte-Chapelle shortly before he departed for the Seventh Crusade. It housed the sacred relics Louis had acquired, which were believed to be the crown of thorns and wood from the cross of the Crucifixion of Christ, purchased in 1238 from the governor of Constantinople. These symbols allowed Louis to present himself not just as the king of France, but as the leader of the Christian world. The chapel had two levels, the lower level for ordinary servants of the king, and the upper level for the king and royal family. Only the king was allowed to touch the crown of thorns, which he took out each year on Good Friday.

King Philip IV (1285–1314) reconstructed the royal residence on the Île de la Cité, transforming it from a fortress into a palace. Two of the great ceremonial halls still remain within the structure of the Palais de Justice. The palace complex included the residence of the king, with a private chapel, or oratory; a building for the law courts; a large hall for ceremonies; and a donjon, or tower, which was still standing in the mid-19th century. The palace also had a private walled garden at the end of the island and a private dock, from which the king could travel by boat to his other residences, the Louvre fortress on the Right Bank and the Tour de Nesle on the Left Bank.

In the later Middle Ages, the Palais de le Cité was the financial and judicial center of the kingdom; the home of the courts of justice and the Parlement de Paris, a high court composed of nobles. The royal offices took their names from the different chambers, or rooms, of the palace; the Chambre des Comptes (chamber of the accounts), was the treasury of the kingdom, and the courts were divided between the Chambre civile and the Chambre criminelle. The tangible symbol of royal power was the large black marble table in the hall of the king, which was used for royal banquets, and also for ceremonial events, the taking of oaths and sessions of the military high courts.

Once Paris became the permanent seat of the government, the number of officials began to grow. This created a demand for educated lawyers, clerks and administrators. This need was met by the incorporation of the many small colleges on the Left Bank into the University of Paris. Also, since the king had a permanent residence in Paris, the members of the nobility followed his example and built their own palatial town houses. The presence of the nobles in Paris created a large market for luxury goods, such as furs, silks, armor and weapons, causing the merchants of the Right Bank to thrive. It also created a need for money-lenders, some of whom became the richest individuals in Paris.

=== The Louvre and the Hotel Royal of Saint-Pol ===
As the palace became the center of administration and justice in France, the kings began to spend less and less time there. Between 1190 and 1202, Philip II built the massive fortress of the Louvre, designed to protect the Right Bank of the Seine against an English attack from Normandy. The fortress was a great rectangle, 72 by 78 meters, surrounded by four towers and a moat. In the center was a circular tower thirty meters high. It was the anchor on the Right Bank of the new wall he built around the city. Philip began to use the new castle for recreation and also for ceremonial functions; the vassals of the king took their oath of loyalty at the Louvre rather than the city palace.

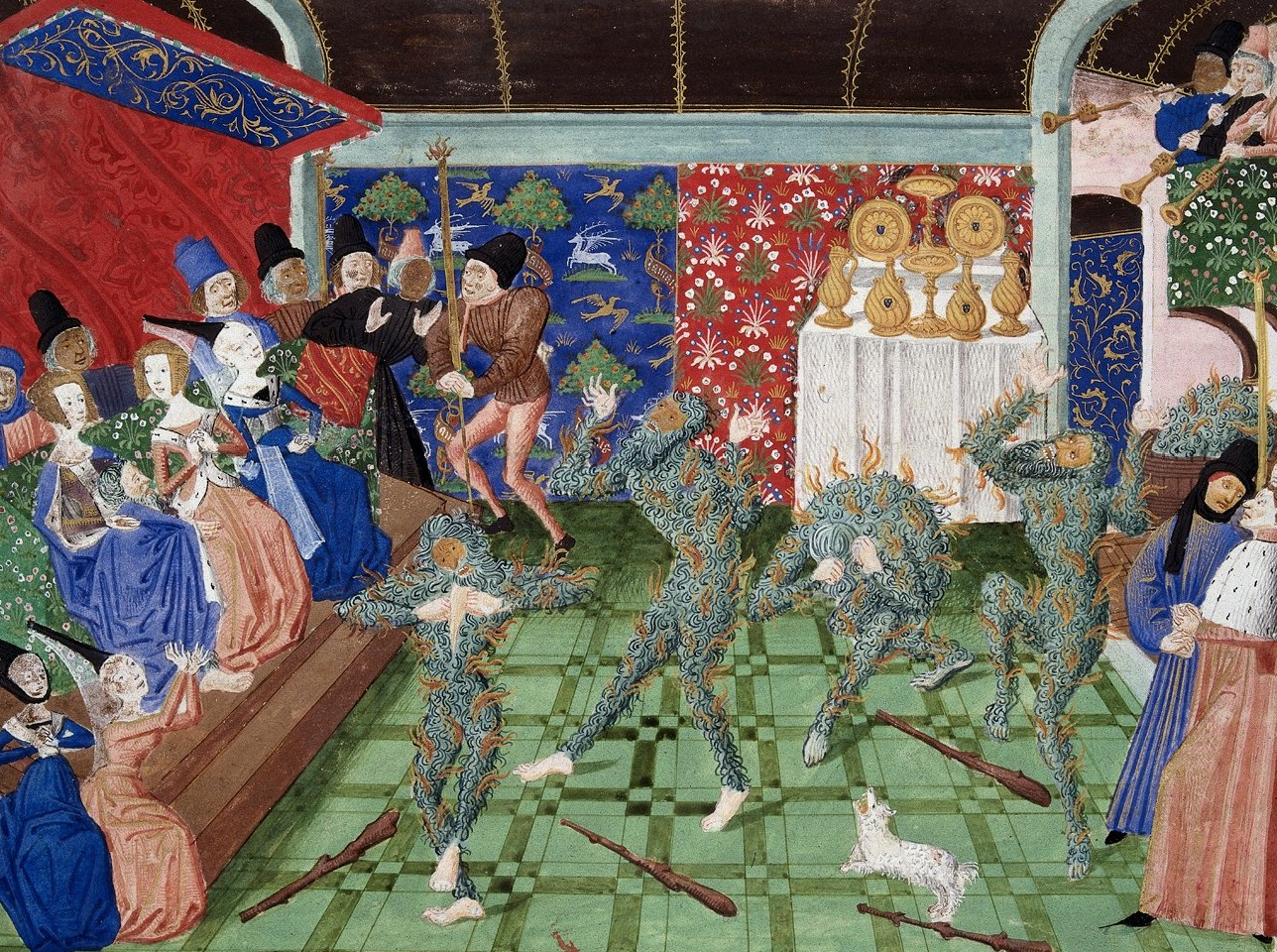
King Charles VI nearly burned to death in 1393 at the Bal des Ardents at the Hôtel Saint-Pol

Between 1361 and 1364, Charles V, distrustful of the turbulent Parisians and offended by the foul air and smells of the medieval city, decided to move his residence permanently from the Île de la Cité to a safer and healthier location. He built a new residential complex in the Saint-Antoine quarter between the wall built by Philip II and the Bastille, the most powerful fortress of the new wall that he was building around the city. The new residence, called the Hôtel Saint-Pol, covered a large area between the Rue Saint Antoine and the Seine and the Rue Saint-Paul and Rue du Petit-Musc. It was the site of the notorious Bal des Ardents in 1393, when the elaborate costumes of four dancers, all members of the nobility, caught fire and burned them to death, while Charles VI, one of the dancers, barely escaped. Charles VII abandoned it when he fled Paris in 1418. By 1519, the buildings were in ruins and torn down soon afterwards. The church of Saint-Paul-Saint-Louis was built on the site.

Further east, outside the city walls, in the royal forest, Charles V rebuilt the Château de Vincennes, which became one of his principal residences. Within its walls and towers, he re-created the Palais de la Cité, complete with a full-size replica of the royal Sainte-Chapelle. Rulers from Louis XI to Francis I preferred to reside either at Vincennes or in the Châteaux of the Loire Valley.

== The Cathedral and the Clergy ==
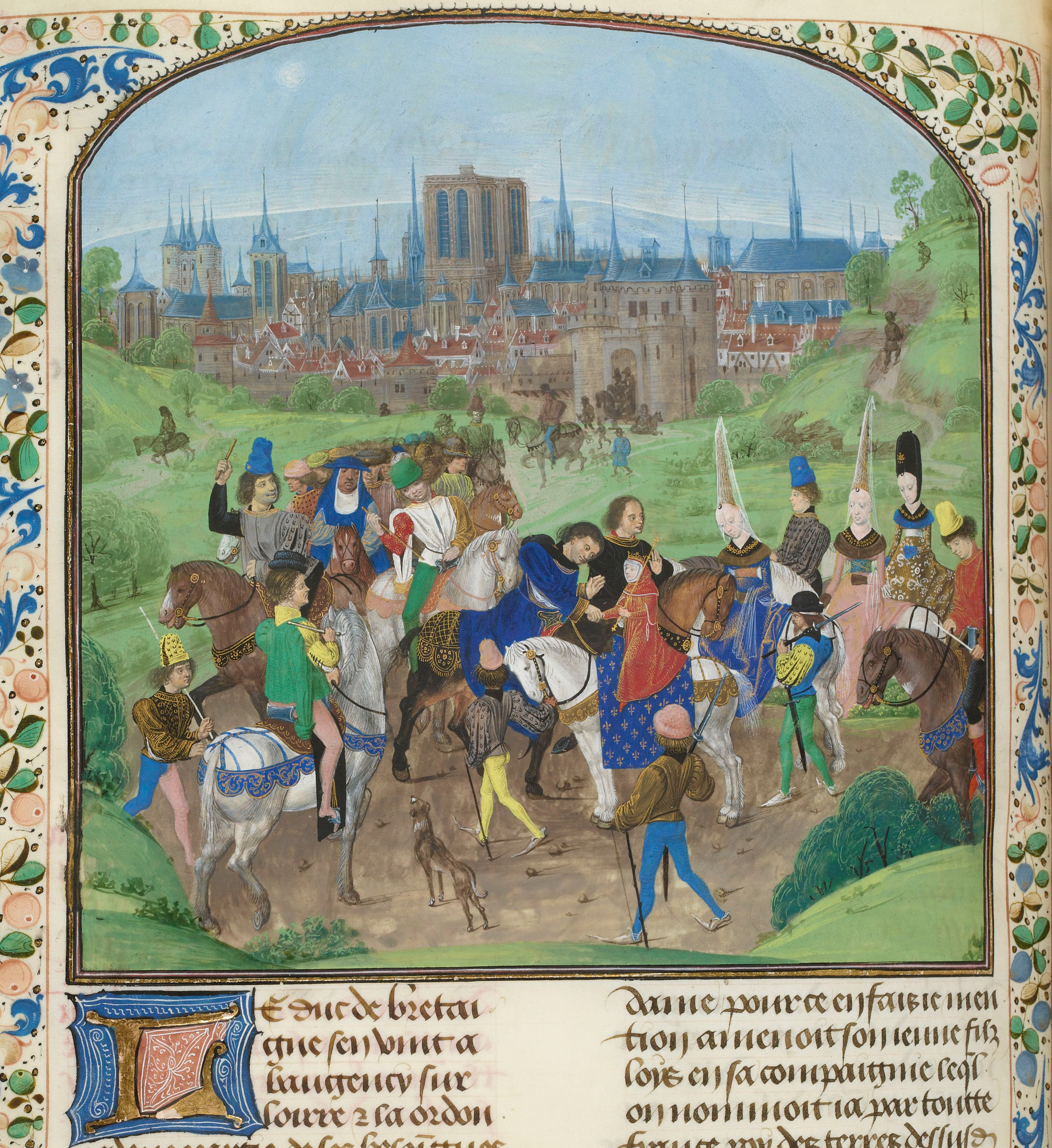
The Cathedral of Notre-Dame in the 15th century, by Jean Froissart (National Library of France)

While the seat of royal power during the Middle Ages was on the west end of the Île de la Cité, the center of religious authority was at the east end of the island, in the Cathedral of Notre-Dame de Paris, the cloisters of Notre-Dame, the school of the Cathedral, and the residence of the Bishop of Paris, next to the cathedral. The Catholic Church played a prominent role in the city throughout the Middle Ages; it owned a large part of the land and wealth, was the creator of the University of Paris and was closely linked to the king and the government. Clerics also made up a significant part of the population; in 1300, the Bishop of Paris was assisted by 51 chanoines (canons), and each of the thirty-three parish churches had its own curé (curate), vicar, and chaplains. There were thousands of monks and nuns in the eighty-eight convents and monasteries, numerous beguines and religious orders, and there were about three thousand students who had taken religious orders and were considered clerics. Altogether, there were about 20,000 members of religious orders in the city, or about ten percent of the population, in the year 1300.

=== The Cathedral of Notre-Dame ===
According to tradition, Paris was converted to Christianity in about 250 AD by Saint Denis, a bishop sent to Christianize Gaul by Pope Fabian. He was martyred and buried at Saint-Denis, where a basilica was founded to mark his grave. The first Christian church is believed to have been built near where Notre Dame Cathedral is today, on the site a Roman temple to Jupiter; stones from the Roman temple were found beneath the choir of Notre Dame when the choir was renovated in 1711 and are now on display in the Cluny Museum. This was the Cathedral of Saint Etienne, Paris, dedicated in 375 to Saint Étienne (Saint Stephen) and located in front of where the Cathedral is today. Saint Genevieve was said to have gathered the faithful inside the cathedral when the city was threatened by Germanic invaders. In 528, King Childebert I constructed a new cathedral, called Notre-Dame, next to the church of Saint-Étienne. Twelve stones from the seats of the ancient Roman amphitheater were found in the foundations of the church. A baptistry, called the Church of St. Jean-le-Rond, served both the early Saint-Etienne cathedral and Notre-Dame-de-Paris until its own demolition in the 17th century.

The modern cathedral is the work of Maurice de Sully, the Bishop of Paris, who had originally come from a poor family in the Loire Valley to study at the school of the cathedral. He became the bishop in 1160, and it was he who baptized Philip II, the son of King Louis VII, in 1163. In the same year, the first stone of the cathedral was laid by Pope Alexander III. The altar was consecrated in 1182. Sully guided the work on the church until his death in 1196, following the new style innovated by Abbot Suger at the nearby Basilica of Saint-Denis. The façade was built between 1200 and 1225, and the two towers were built between 1225 and 1250. The church was not finished until the reign of Philip IV in 1330, almost 170 years after it was begun. It was the largest monument in Paris, 125 meters long, with towers 63 meters high, and seats for 1300 worshippers.

=== The School of Notre-Dame ===
The cloister of Notre-Dame occupied the whole area of the island to the north of the cathedral; it was not a cloister in the traditional sense, but a small city enclosed by a wall, where the clerical community of Notre-Dame lived and worked. It also included a large garden on the eastern end of the island. In the 11th century, the first school in Paris was established there, teaching young boys reading, writing, arithmetic, the catechism, and singing. In the early 12th century, schools teaching these basic subjects were spread around the city, while the School of Notre-Dame concentrated on higher education; grammar, rhetoric, dialectics, arithmetic, geometry, astrology, and music.

The School of Notre-Dame became famous throughout Europe; it produced seven popes and twenty-nine cardinals; the future Louis VII studied there, as did the nephews of Pope Alexander III. The teachers included Pierre Abelard, Maurice de Sully, Pierre Lombard, Saint Thomas Aquinas, and Saint Bonaventure. It was the dominant school in Paris until the late 12th century, when it began to be eclipsed by the new colleges established around the monasteries on the Left bank, which were not under the authority of the Bishop of Paris, but directly under the pope. In this way, the School of Notre-Dame was the ancestor of the University of Paris, when it was chartered in about 1200.

=== The Monasteries ===
The first monasteries appeared in Paris during the Merovingian Dynasty (481–731 AD) and were mostly located around the Mountain of Sainte-Geneviève on the Left Bank, where the old Roman city of Lutetia was situated. The Abbey of Saint Laurent was founded in the first half of the 6th century; in the early 7th century, the Basilica of the Saints-Apôtres (the Holy Apostles), the future Abbey of Sainte-Geneviève, was established near the site of the old Roman forum on the Left Bank. Farther west on the Left Bank, Saint Germain of Paris founded the Abbey of Sainte-Croix and Saint Vincent, which after his death became the Abbey of Saint-Germain-des-Prés. The abbeys were independent of the Bishop of Paris; they were governed by the pope and usually had direct connections with the king. They owned a very large part of the land of Paris, particularly on the Left Bank, and played a large part in its economic life; they produced food and wine and operated the largest commercial fairs. They also played a central role in cultural life by running all the schools and colleges and by producing works of art, especially illuminated manuscripts.

=== The Bishops of Paris ===
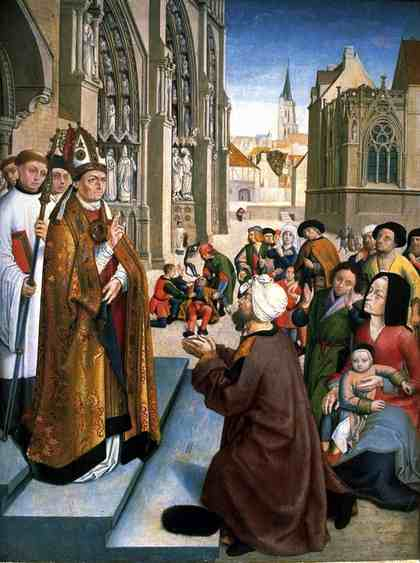
In an anonymous illustration of about 1500, the Bishop of Paris is depicted in front of the Cathedral of Notre-Dame de Paris with the Hôtel-Dieu in the background.

During most of the Middle Ages, the Bishops of Paris and the Abbots of Saint-Denis were closely allied with the royal government. Suger, the Abbot of Saint Denis, was both a pioneer in church architecture and a royal advisor. When Louis VII departed for the Second Crusade, he entrusted Suger with the treasury of the kingdom.

The pope did not appreciate the close ties between the kings of France and the bishops of Paris; although Paris was the capital and largest city of France, the bishop was under the authority of the archbishop of Sens, a much smaller city. In 1377, Charles V of France asked Pope Gregory XI to raise Paris to the status of an archdiocese, but the pope refused. Paris did not become an archdiocese until the reign of Louis XIV.

In the later Middle Ages, important positions in the church were given more and more often to members of the aristocracy of wealthy families who had provided services to the Court; abbots were assured of a large income. One of the greatest benefits was to receive one of the twenty-seven houses that surrounded the cloister of Notre Dame, located northeast of the cathedral at the end of the Île de la Cité. The position of the curate of a parish in Paris was also often given to those who had done favors for the king, rather than those who had demonstrated religious devotion.

=== Religious Orders and the Templars ===
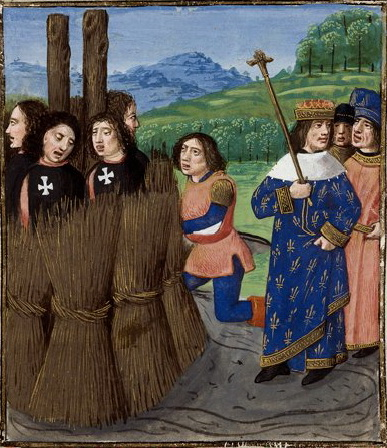
The leaders of the Knights Templar were burned at the stake on 18 March 1314 on the orders of Philip IV, shown at right

In the 13th century, new religious orders arrived in Paris with the mission of fighting heresies that had appeared inside and outside the church. The Dominican Order was the first to arrive in 1217, charged with teaching orthodox church doctrine both within the university and to the Parisians. They established their headquarters on the Rue Saint-Jacques in 1218. The Franciscan Order came in 1217–1219 and established chapters at Saint Denis, on the Montagne Sainte-Geneviève, and, with the support of King Louis IX, at Saint-Germain des Prés.

Another important religious order arrived in Paris in the mid-12th century: the Knights Templar, who established their headquarters at the Old Temple on the Right Bank next to the Seine near the churches of Saint-Gervais and Saint-Jean-en-Grève. In the 13th century, they built a fortress with a high tower on what is now the Place du Temple. The Knights Templar owned a considerable amount of land in the city and were the guardians of the treasury for King Louis IX, Philip III, and Philip IV at the beginning of his reign. Philip IV was resentful at the power of the Templars and had their leaders arrested in 1307, then condemned and burned. All the belongings of the Templars were seized and handed over to another military order, the Knights Hospitaller, which was more closely under royal control.

In the late Middle Ages, the Confrèries (Confraternities) played an important role. They were societies of wealthy merchants in each parish who contributed to the church and its activities. The most prestigious was the Grande Confrérie de Notre-Dame, which had its own chapel on the Île-de-Cité. It had an enormous treasury, which was governed during one period by Étienne Marcel, the provost of the merchants and the first mayor of Paris.

By the end of the 15th century, the prestige of the church in Paris was in decline, due largely to financial scandals and corruption. This set the stage for the arrival of Protestantism and the French Wars of Religion that followed the Middle Ages.

== The University of Paris ==
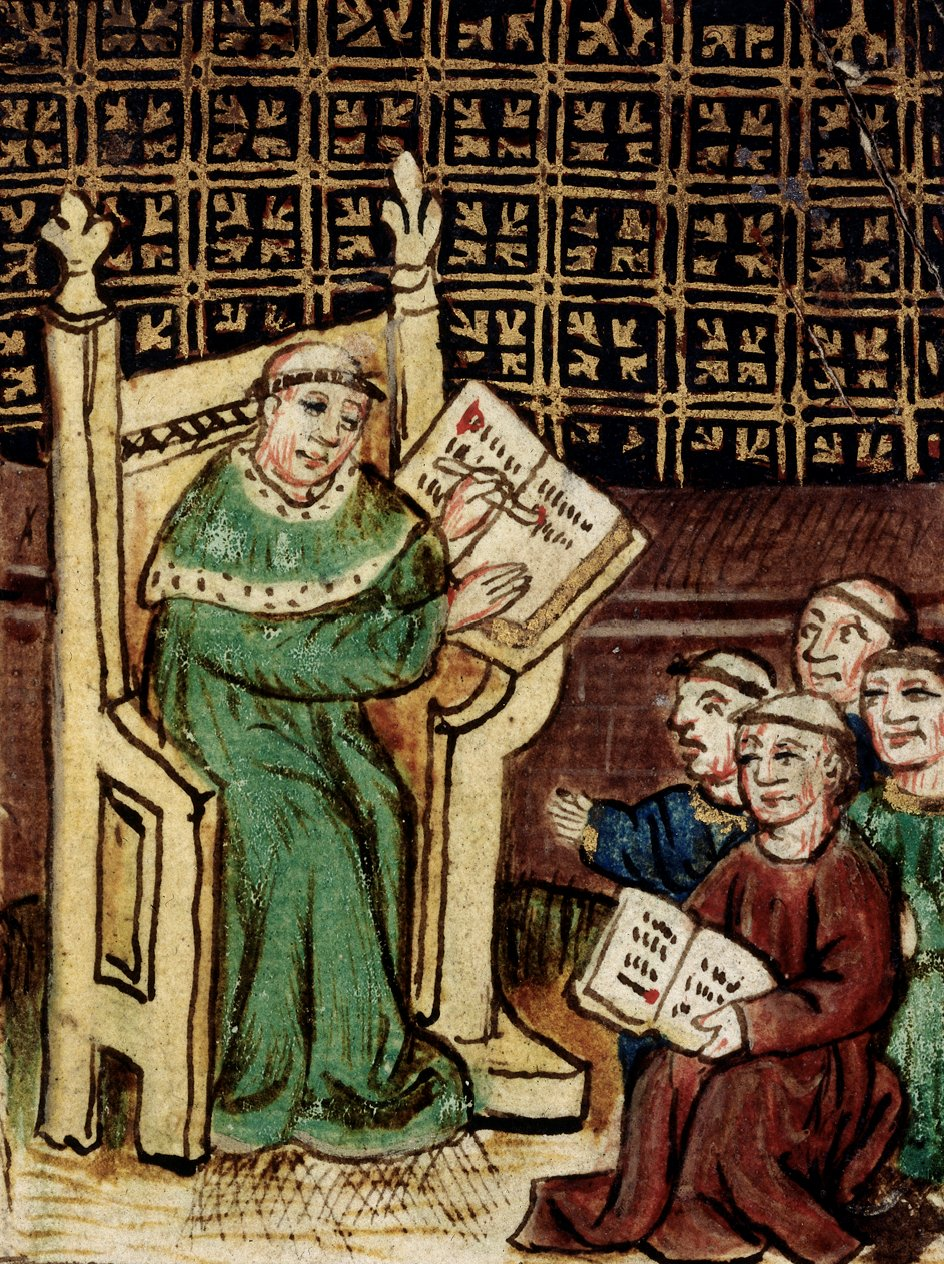
A scholar and students as depicted in a work of Gautier de Metz published in 1464

During the 12th century, the teachers of the School of Notre Dame established Paris as one of the leading centers of scholarship in Europe. As the century advanced, the intellectual center moved from Notre Dame to the Left Bank, where the monasteries, which were independent of the Bishop of Paris, began to establish their own schools. One of the most important new schools was established on the left bank at the Abbey of Sainte-Geneviève; its teachers included the scholar Pierre Abelard (1079–1142), who taught five thousand students. Abelard was forced to leave the university because of the scandal caused by his romance with the nun Héloïse. The schools trained not only clerics for the church, but also clerks who could read and write for the growing administration of the kingdom of France.

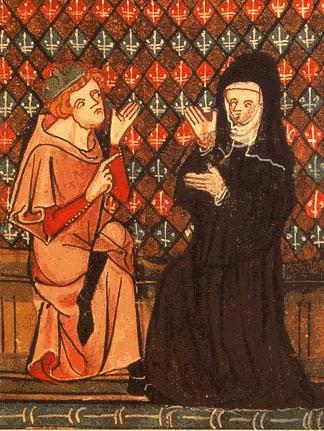
The monk and scholar Abélard and the nun Héloïse began a legendary Paris romance in about 1116. They are depicted here in a 14th-century manuscript of the Roman de la Rose

By the end of the 12th century the neighborhood around the Montagne Sainte-Geneviève was crowded with students who frequently came into conflict with the neighbors and the authorities of the city. One particular battle in 1200 between students and the townspeople in a tavern left five persons dead; King Philip II was called in to define the rights and legal status of students formally. Thereafter, the students and teachers were gradually organized into a corporation that was officially recognized in 1215 as a university by Pope Innocent III, who had studied there. In the 13th century, there were between two and three thousand students living in the Left Bank, which became known as the Latin Quarter, because Latin was the language of instruction at the university. The number grew to about four thousand in the 14th century. The poorer students lived in colleges (Collegia pauperum magistrorum) that functioned as dormitories where they were lodged and fed. In 1257, the chaplain of Louis IX, Robert de Sorbon, opened the most famous college of the university, which was later named after him: the Sorbonne.From the 13th to the 15th century, the University of Paris was the most important school of catholic theology in Western Europe, whose teachers included Roger Bacon from England, Saint Thomas Aquinas from Italy, and Saint Bonaventure from Germany.

The University of Paris was originally organized into four faculties: theology, canon law, medicine, and arts and letters. The arts and letters students were the most numerous; their courses included grammar, rhetoric, dialectics, arithmetic, geometry, music, and astronomy. Their course of study led first to a bachelor's degree, then a master's degree, which allowed them to teach. Students began at the age of fourteen and studied at the faculty of arts until they were twenty. The completion of a doctorate in theology required a minimum of another ten years of study.

Throughout the Middle Ages, the University of Paris grew in size and experienced almost continual conflicts between students and the townspeople. It was also divided by all of the theological and political conflicts of the period: disputes between the king and the pope; disputes between the Burgundians and the Armagnacs; and disputes between English occupiers and the king of France. By the end of the Middle Ages, the University had become a very conservative force against any change in society. Dissection of corpses was forbidden in the medical school long after it became common practice at other universities, and unorthodox ideas were regularly condemned by the faculty; individuals viewed as heretics were punished. In February 1431, a tribunal of faculty members led by Pierre Cauchon was called upon by the English and Burgundians to judge whether Joan of Arc was guilty of heresy. After three months of study, they found her guilty on all charges, and demanded her rapid execution.

== Social classes, wealth and poverty ==
The population of medieval Paris was strictly divided into social classes, whose members wore distinctive clothing, followed strict rules of behavior, and had very distinct roles to play in society. At the top of the social structure was the hereditary nobility. Just below the nobility were the clerics, who made up about ten percent of the city population with the inclusion of students. They maintained their own separate and strict hierarchy. Unlike the nobility, it was possible for those with talent and modest means to enter and advance in the clergy; Maurice de Sully came from a family of modest means to become the Bishop of Paris and builder of Notre-Dame cathedral.

The wealthy merchants and bankers were a small part of the population, but their power and influence grew throughout the Middle Ages. In the 13th century, the bourgeois of Paris, those who paid taxes, amounted to about fifteen percent of the population. According to tax records at the end of the 13th century, the wealthiest one percent of Parisians paid eighty percent of the taxes. According to tax records, the wealthy bourgeois of Paris between 1250 and 1350 numbered just 140 families or about two thousand persons. Below this level were the artisans who possessed their own shops and their own tools. According to the Livre des métiers ("Book of Professions") published in 1268 by the Provost of Paris, the artisans of Paris were formally divided into about one hundred corporations and 1300 distinct professions, each with its own set of rules, largely designed to limit competition and assure employment.

The great majority of Parisians, about 70 percent, paid no taxes and led a very precarious existence. Fortunately for the poor, the theology of the Middle Ages required the wealthy to give money to the poor and warned them that it would be difficult for them to enter Heaven if they were not charitable. Noble families and the wealthy funded hospitals, orphanages, hospices, and other charitable institutions in the city. Early in the Middle Ages, beggars were generally respected and had an accepted social role. Later in the Middle Ages, at the end of the 14th and early 15th centuries, when the city was struck repeatedly by plague and refugees from wars flooded the city, the charitable institutions were overwhelmed and Parisians became less welcoming; beggars and those without professions were rounded up and expelled from the city.

== Commerce ==
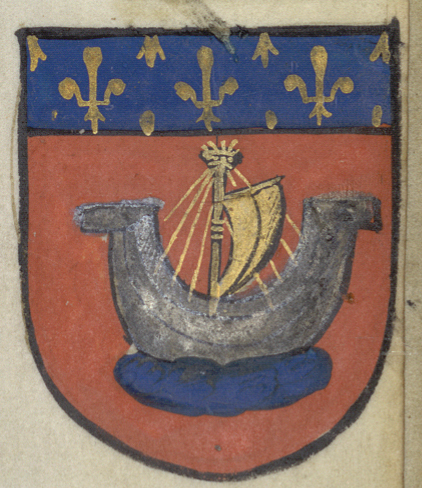
The coat of arms of the league of Paris river merchants in the Middle Ages became the emblem of the city of Paris

Commerce was a major source of the wealth and influence of Paris in the Middle Ages. Even before the Roman conquest of Gaul, the first inhabitants of the city, the Parisii, had traded with cities as far away as Spain and Eastern Europe and had minted their own coins for this purpose. In the Gallo-Roman town of Lutetia, the boatmen dedicated a column to the god Mercury that was found during excavations under the choir of Notre Dame. In 1121, during the reign of Louis VI, the king accorded to the league of boatmen of Paris a fee of sixty centimes for each boatload of wine that arrived in the city during the harvest. In 1170, Louis VII extended the privileges of the river merchants even further; only the boatmen of Paris were allowed to conduct commerce on the river between the bridge of Mantes and the two bridges of Paris; the cargoes of other boats would be confiscated. This was the beginning of the close association between the merchants and the king. The arrangement with the river merchants coincided with a great expansion of commerce and increase in the population on the Right Bank of the city.

The large monasteries also played an important role in the growth of commerce in the Middle Ages by holding large fairs that attracted merchants from as far away as Saxony and Italy. The Abbey of Saint Denis had been holding a large annual fair since the seventh century; the fair of Saint-Mathias dated to the 8th century; The Lenit Fair appeared in the 10th century, and the Fair of the Abbey of Saint-Germain-des-Pres began in the 12th century.

=== The ports ===
By the time of Philip Augustus the port of the Grève was not large enough to handle all the river commerce. The King granted the league of river merchants a sum collected from each shipload of salt, herring, hay and grain that arrived in the city to build a new port, called de l'Ecole, where Place de l'École is today. The King also gave the corporation the power to supervise the accuracy of the scales used in the markets, and to settle minor commercial disputes. By the 15th century separate ports were established along the river for the delivery of wine, grain, plaster, paving stones, hay, fish, and charcoal. Wood for cooking fires and heating was unloaded at one port, while wood for construction arrived at another. The merchants engaged in each kind of commerce gathered around that port; in 1421, of the twenty-one wine merchants registered in Paris, eleven were located between the Pont Notre-Dame and the hotel Saint-Paul, the neighborhood where their port was located. After the Grève, the second-largest port was by the church of Saint-Germain-l'Auxerois, where ships unloaded fish from the coast, wood from the forests along the Aisne and Oise Rivers, hay from the Valley of the Seine, and cider from Normandy.

=== The markets ===
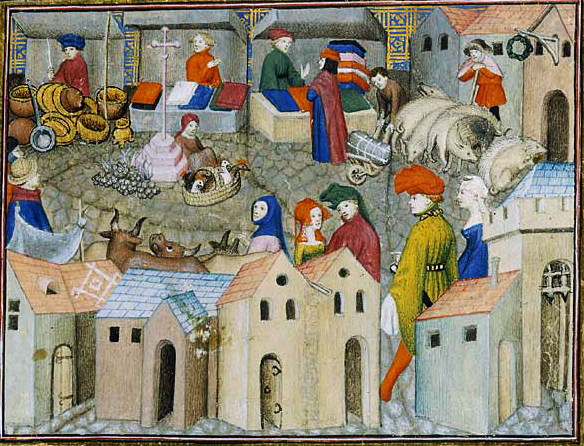
A Paris market as depicted in Le Chevalier Errant by Thomas de Saluces (about 1403)

In the early Middle Ages, the principal market of Paris was located on the parvis (square) in front of the Cathedral of Notre-Dame. Other markets took place in the vicinity of the two bridges, the Grand Pont and the Petit Pont, while a smaller market called Palu or Palud, took place in the eastern neighborhood of the city. As the population grew on the Right Bank, another market appeared on the Place de Grève, where the Hôtel de Ville is located today, and another near the city gate, at what is now the Place du Châtelet. This market was the site of the Grande Boucherie, the main meat market of the city. The most important market appeared in 1137 when Louis VI purchased a piece of land called Les Champeaux not far from the Place de Grève to create a grain market; over the course of the Middle Ages halls for meat, fish, fruits and vegetables and other food products were built around the grain market, and it became the main food market, known as Les Halles. It continued to be the main produce market in Paris until the late 20th century, when it was transferred to Rungis in the Paris suburbs.

There were other more specialized markets within the city: beef, veal and pork were sold at the intersection of the Rue Saint Honoré, Rue Tirechappe and Rue des Bourdonnais. Later, during the reign of Charles V, the meat market was transferred to the neighborhood of the Butte Saint-Roche. The market for lamb and mutton was originally near the wooden tower of the old Louvre, until it was moved in 1490 near the city wall at the Porte d'Orléans. The first horse market was established in 1475 near Rue Garancière and Rue de Tournon; it had the picturesque name of Pré Crotté (the "Field of horse turds").

=== Artisans and guilds ===
The second important business community in Paris were that of the artisans and craftsmen, who produced and sold goods of all kinds. They were organized into guilds, or corporations, that had strict rules and regulations to protect their members against competition and unemployment. The oldest four corporations were the drapiers, who made cloth; the merciers, who made and sold clothing, the epiciers, who sold food and spices, and the pelletiers, who made fur garments, but there were many more specialized professions, ranging from shoemakers and jewelers to those who made armor and swords. The guilds strictly limited the number of apprentices in each trade and the number of years of apprenticeship. Certain guilds tended to gather on the same streets, though this was not a strict rule. The drapers had their shops on the Rue de la Vieille-Draperie on the Ile de la Cité, while the pelletiers were just north of them; the armorers north of the Châtelet fortress and east of the Rue Saint-Denis. The vendors of parchment, illuminators and book sellers were found on the Left Bank, near the University, on the Rue de la Parcheminerie, Rue Neuve-Notre-Dame, Rue Eremburg-de-Brie, Rue Écrivains, and Rue Saint-Séverin. The manufacture of cloth was important until the 14th century, but it lost its leading role to competition from other cities and was replaced by crafts which made more finished clothing items: tailors, dyers, ribbon-makers, makers of belts and bonnets.

=== Money changers and bankers ===
Money changers were active in Paris since at least 1141; they knew the exact values of all the different silver and gold coins in circulation in Europe. They had their establishments primarily on the Grand Pont, which became known as the Pont aux Changeurs and then simply the Pont au Change. Tax Records show that in 1423 the money changers were among the wealthiest persons in the city; of the twenty persons with the highest incomes, ten were money changers. Between 1412 and 1450, four money changers occupied the position of Provost of the Merchants. But by the end of the 15th century, the system of wealth had changed; the wealthiest Parisians were those who had bought land or positions in the royal administration and were close to the king.

Some money changers branched into a new trade, that of lending money for interest. Since this was officially forbidden by the Catholic Church, most in the profession were either Jews or Lombards from Italy. The Lombards, connected to a well-organizer banking system in Italy, specialized in loans to the wealthy and the nobility. Their activities were recorded in Paris archives from 1292 onwards; they made important loans to King Philip IV and Philip VI.

== Governing the city ==
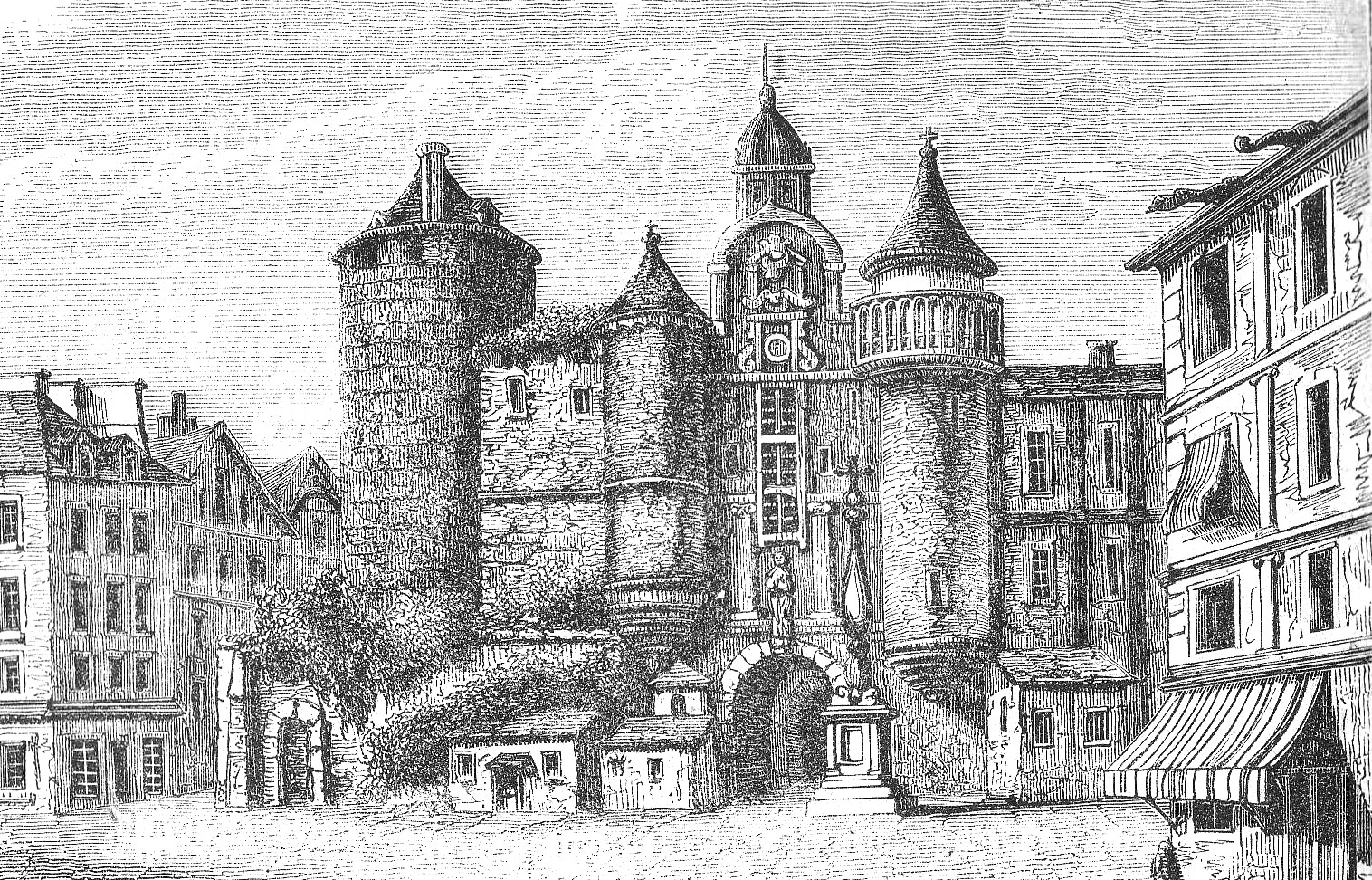
The Grand Châtelet around 1800, looking south from the rue Saint-Denis

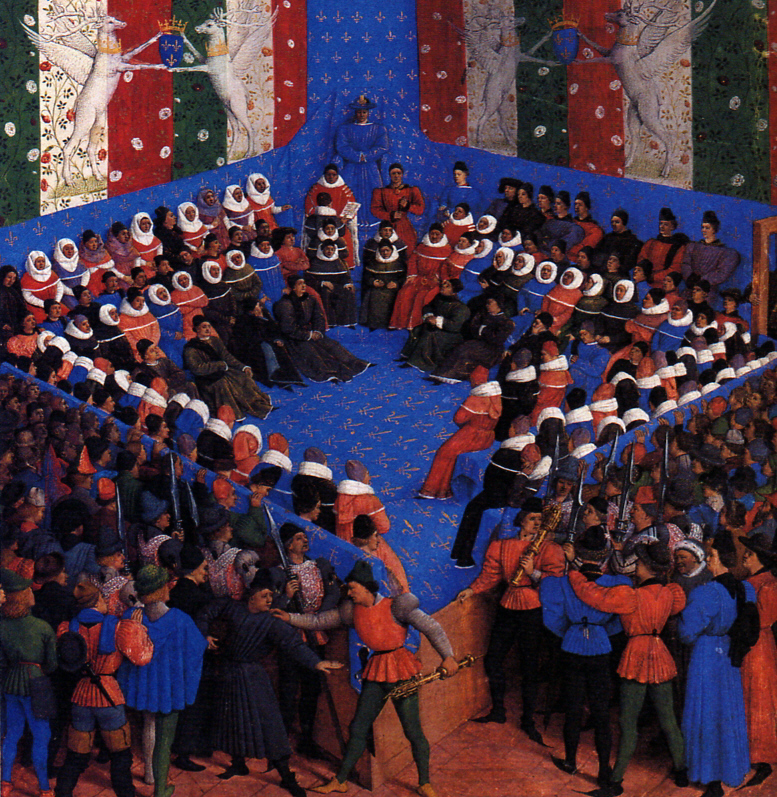
The Parlement of Paris in about 1450, by Jean Fouquet It was actually a court, rather than a legislature, and rendered justice in the king's name

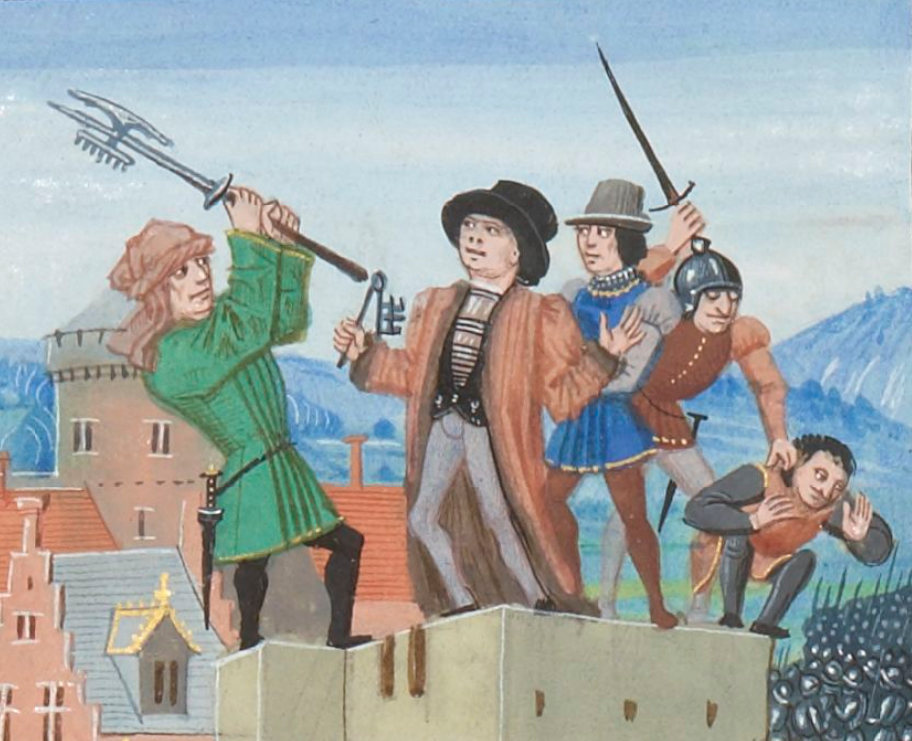
The death of Étienne Marcel.

Between 996 and 1031, Robert the Pious named the first Prévôt, or Royal Provost of Paris, to be the administrator of the city. Originally, the position was purchased for a large sum of money, but after scandals during the reign of Louis IX caused by provosts who used the position to become rich, the position was given to proven administrators. The provost lived in the Grand Châtelet fortress. He combined the positions of financial manager, chief of police, chief judge and chief administrator of the city, though the financial management position was soon taken away and given to a separate Receveur de Paris. For his role in administering justice, he had a lieutenant for civil law, one for criminal law, and one for minor infractions. He also had two "examiners" to carry out investigations. In 1301, the provost was given an additional staff of sixty clerks to act as notaries to register documents and decrees.

Louis IX created a new position, the Provost of the Merchants (prévôt des marchands), to share authority with the Royal Provost. This position recognized the growing power and wealth of the merchants of Paris. He also created the first municipal council of Paris with twenty-four members. The Provost of the Merchants had his headquarters in the Parloir aux Bourgeois, located in the 13th century on Rue Saint-Denis close to the Seine and the Châtelet fortress, where the Royal Provost resided. In 1357, the Provost of the Merchants was Étienne Marcel, who purchased the Maison aux Piliers on the Place de Grève, which became the first city hall; the current city hall occupies the same location.

The Parlement de Paris was created in 1250. It was a national, not a local, institution and functioned as a court rather than a legislature by rendering justice in the name of the king. It was usually summoned only in difficult periods when the king wanted to gather broader support for his actions.

With the growth in population came growing social tensions. The first riots against the Provost of the Merchants took place in December 1306, when the merchants were accused of raising rents. The houses of many merchants were burned, and twenty-eight rioters were hanged. In January 1357, Étienne Marcel led a merchants' revolt in a bid to curb the power of the monarchy and obtain privileges for the city and the Estates General, which had met for the first time in Paris in 1347. After initial concessions by the Crown, the city was retaken by royalist forces in 1358 and Marcel and his followers were killed. Thereafter, the powers of the local government were considerably reduced, and the city was kept much more tightly under royal control.

=== The police and firemen ===
The streets of Paris were particularly dangerous at night because of the absence of any lights. As early as 595 AD, Chlothar II, King of the Franks, required that the city have a guet, or force of watchmen, to patrol the streets. It was manned by members of the métiers, the trades and professions in Paris, who served in rotations of three weeks. This night watch was insufficient to maintain security in such a large city, so a second force of guardians was formed whose members were permanently stationed at key points around Paris. The two guets were under the authority of the Provost of Paris and commanded by the Chevalier du guet. The name of the first one, Geofroy de Courferraud, was recorded in 1260. He commanded a force of twelve sergeants during the day and an additional twenty sergeants and twelve other sergeants on horseback to patrol the streets at night. The sergeants on horseback went from post to post to see that they were properly manned. The night watch of the tradesmen continued. Groups of six were stationed at the Châtelet to guard the prisoners it contained; in the courtyard of the royal palace to protect the relics in Sainte-Chapelle; at the residence of the king; at the Church of the Madeleine on the Île de la Cité; at the fountain of the Innocents at the Place de Grève; and several other points around the city. This policing system was not very effective. In 1563, it was finally replaced by a larger and more organized force of four hundred soldiers and one hundred cavalry that was reinforced during times of trouble by a militia of one hundred tradesmen from each quarter of the city.

There was no professional force of firemen in the city during the Middle Ages; an edict of 1363 required that everyone in a neighborhood join in to fight a fire. The role of firefighters was gradually taken over by monks, who were numerous in the city. The Cordeliers, Dominicans, Franciscans, Jacobins, Augustinians and Carmelites all took an active role in fighting fires. The first professional fire companies were not formed until the eighteenth century.

=== Crime and punishment ===
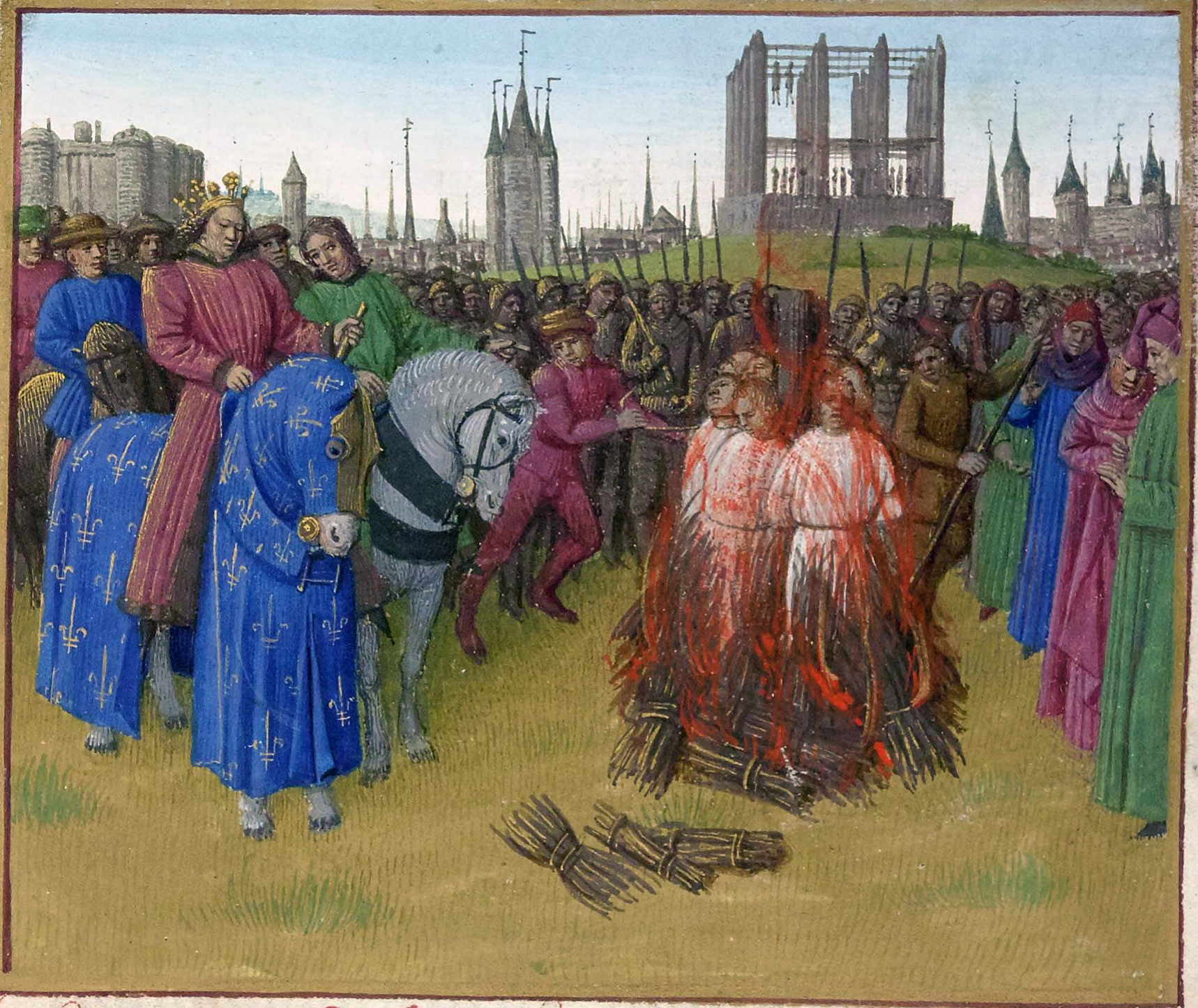
The execution of Amalrician heretics in 1210, an event witnessed by King Philip II, as depicted by Jean Fouquet, ca. 1455. The Bastille (left) and Gibbet of Montfaucon are visible the background.

Paris, like all large medieval cities, had its share of crime and criminals, though it was not quite as portrayed by Victor Hugo in The Hunchback of Notre-Dame (1831). The "Grand Court of Miracles" described by Victor Hugo, a gathering place for beggars who pretended to be injured or blind, was a real place: the Fief d'Alby in the Second Arrondissement between the Rue du Caire and Rue Réaumur. Nonetheless, it did not have the name recorded by Hugo or a reputation as a place the police feared to enter until the 17th century.

The most common serious crime was murder, which accounted for 55 to 80 percent of the major crimes described in court archives. It was largely the result of the strict code of honor in effect in the Middle Ages; an insult, such as throwing a person's hat in the mud, required a response, which often led to a death. A man whose wife committed adultery was considered justified if he killed the other man. In many cases, these types of murders resulted in a royal pardon. Petty crime was common; men did not have pockets in their clothing, but instead carried purses around their necks or on their belts. Thieves cut them loose and ran away.

Heresy and sorcery were considered especially serious crimes; witches and heretics were usually burned, and the king sometimes attended the executions to display his role as defender of the Christian faith. Others were decapitated or hanged. Beginning in about 1314, a large gibet was built on a hill outside of Paris, near the modern Parc des Buttes Chaumont, where the bodies of executed criminals were displayed.

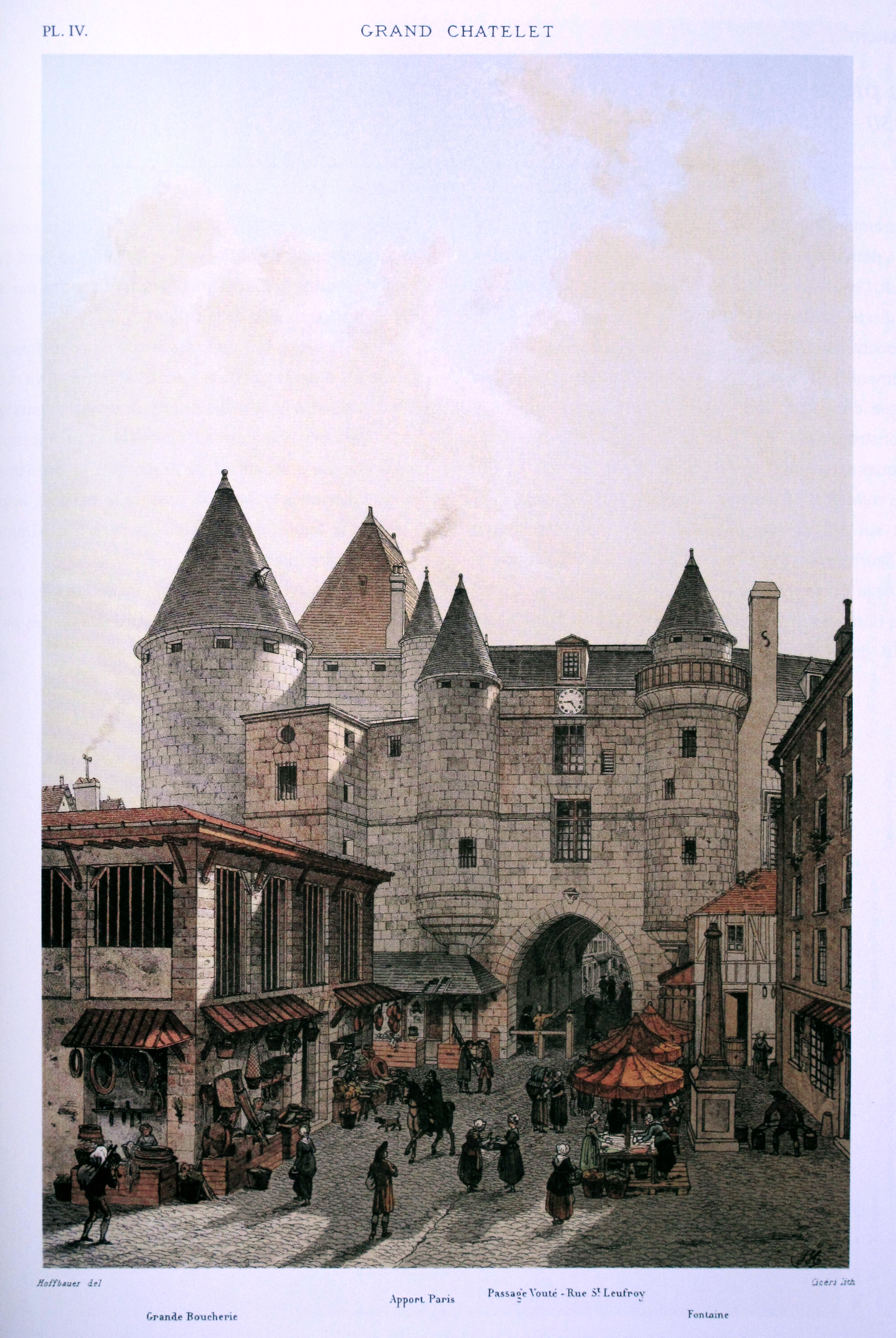
The city's main prison, courts and residence of the Provost of Paris were located in the Grand Châtelet fortress, shown here as it appeared in 1800

Prostitution was a separate category of crime. Prostitutes were numerous and mostly came from the countryside or provincial towns; their profession was strictly regulated, but tolerated. In 1256, the government of Louis IX tried to limit the work areas of prostitutes to certain streets, including the Rue Saint-Denis and Rue Chapon on the Right Bank and the Rue Glatigny on the Île de la Cité, but the rules were difficult to enforce. Prostitutes could be found in taverns, cemeteries, and even in cloisters. Prostitutes were forbidden to wear furs, silks, or jewelry, but regulation was impossible, and their numbers continued to increase.

The Church had its own system of justice for the ten percent of the Paris population who were clerics, including all the students of the University of Paris. Most clerical offenses were minor, ranging from marriage to deviations from official theology. The Bishop had his own pillory on the square in front of Notre Dame, where clerics who had committed crimes could be put on display. For more serious crimes, the Bishop had a prison in a tower adjoining his residence next to the Cathedral, as well as several other prisons for conducting investigations in which torture was permitted. The church courts could condemn clerics to corporal punishment or banishment. In the most extreme cases, such as sorcery or heresy, the Bishop could pass the case to the Provost and civil justice system, which could burn or hang those convicted. This was the process used in the case of the leaders of the Knights Templar. The Abbeys of Saint-Germain-des-Prés and Sainte-Geneviève were largely responsible for justice on the Left Bank and had their own pillories and small prisons.

Royal justice was administered by the Provost of Paris, who had his office and his own prison in the Grand Châtelet fortress on the Right Bank at the end of the Pont de la Cité. He and his two examiners were responsible for judging crimes ranging from theft to murder and sorcery. Royal prisons existed in the city; about a third of their prisoners were debtors who could not pay their debts. Wealthier prisoners paid for the own meals and bed, and their conditions were reasonably comfortable. Prisoners were often released and banished, which saved the royal treasury money. Higher crimes, particularly political crimes, were judged by the Parlement de Paris, which was composed of nobles. The death sentence was very rarely given in Paris courts, only four times between 1380 and 1410. Most prisoners were punished with banishment from the city. Beginning in the reign of Philip VI, political executions, while rare, became more frequent; In 1346 a merchant from Compiègne was tried for saying that Edward III of England had a better claim to the French throne than Philip VI; he was taken to the market square of Les Halles and chopped into small pieces in front of a large crowd.

== Daily life ==
=== The hours of the day ===
The time of day in medieval Paris was announced by the church bells, which rang eight times during the day and night for the different calls to prayer at the monasteries and churches: Prime, for instance, was at six in the morning, Sext at midday, and Vespers at six in the evening, though later in summer and earlier in the winter. The churches also rang their bell for a daily curfew at seven in the evening in winter and eight in summer. The working day was usually measured by the same bells, ending either at vespers or at the curfew. There was little precision in timekeeping, and the bells rarely rang at exactly the same time. The first mechanical clock in Paris appeared in 1300, and in 1341, a clock was recorded at the Sainte-Chapelle. It was not until 1370, under Charles V, who was particularly concerned by precise time, that a mechanical clock was installed on a tower of the Palace, which sounded the hours. Similar clocks were installed at the other royal residences, the hôtel Saint-Paul in the Marais and the Château of Vincennes. This was the first time that the city had an official time of day. By 1418, the churches of Saint-Paul and Saint-Eustache also had clocks, and time throughout the city began to be standardized.

=== Food and drink ===
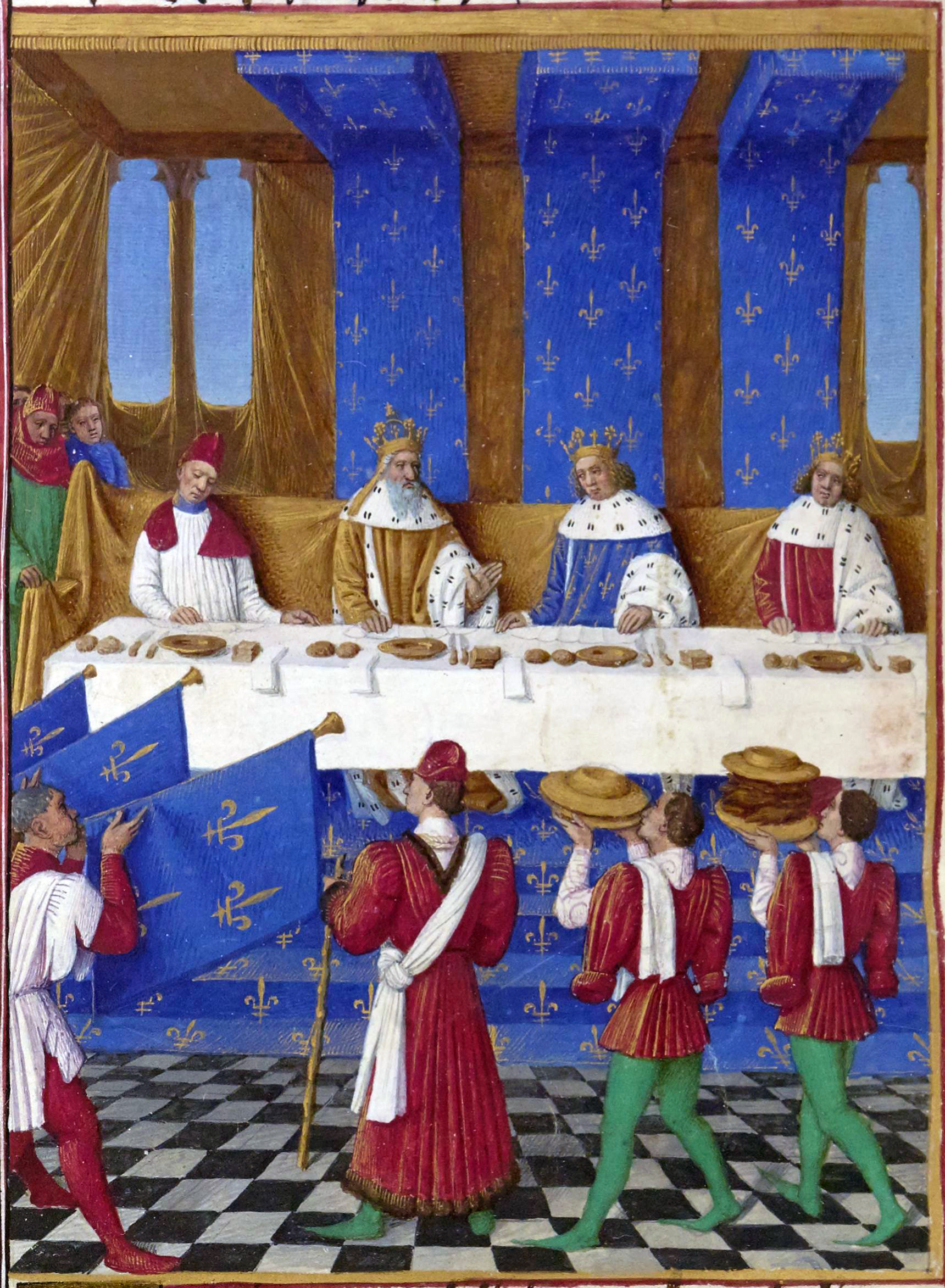
A royal banquet, by Jean Fouquet, 1460 (French National Library)

During the Middle Ages, the staple food of most Parisians was bread. Grain was brought by boat on the Marne and the Seine from towns in the surrounding region and unloaded at the market on the Place de Grève. Mills near the Grand Pont turned it into flour. During the reign of Philip II, a new grain market was opened at Les Halles, which became the main market. When the harvest was poor, the royal government took measures to assure the supply of grain to the city. In 1305, when prices rose too high, Philip IV ordered a collection of all grain remaining in storage in the region and its prompt delivery to Paris at a fixed maximum price. Beginning in 1391, grain merchants were not allowed to hold more than an eight days' supply. Beginning in 1439, all farmers within eight leagues around the city (about 31 kilometers) could sell their grain only to the Paris markets.

Meat was the other main staple of the diet. Enormous herds of cattle, pigs and sheep were brought into the city each day. The animals raised within seven leagues of Paris could be sold only in Paris. The largest cattle market was on the Place aux Pourceaux, at the intersection of the Rue de la Ferronnerie and Rue des Dechargeurs. Another large market was located at the Place aux Veaux, near the Grande Boucherie, the major slaughterhouse.

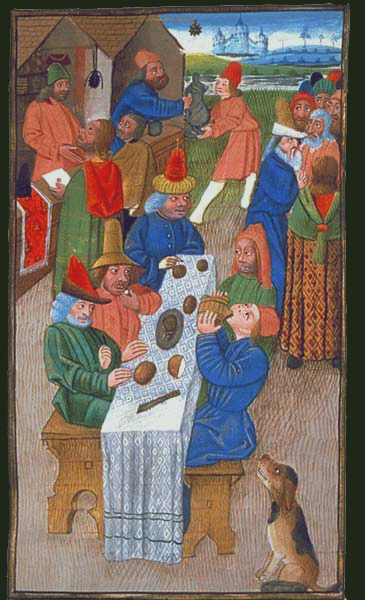
A medieval peasant meal (French National Library)

Fish was another important part of the Parisian diet, largely for religious reasons; there were more than one hundred fifty days a year, including Fridays and Saturdays, when Parisians were required to fast and to eat only boiled vegetables and fish. Most of the fish was salted herring brought from ports on the North Sea and the Baltic Sea. Wealthy Parisians were able to afford fresh fish brought on horseback during the night from Dieppe. The diets of the rich Parisians in the late Middle Ages were exotic and varied; they were supplied with olive oil and citrus fruits from the Mediterranean Basin, cinnamon from Egypt, and saffron and sugar from Italy and Spain. Contrary to a popular notion, spices were not used only to hide the taste of spoiled meat; they were valued for the medicinal qualities and believed to improve the digestion. The chefs of the time made sauces and ragouts by combining spices with an acidic liquid, either vinegar or the white wine from the Île-de-France.

Wine had been introduced to Paris by the Romans, and it was the principal beverage they drank during the Middle Ages. Most of the inexpensive wine came from vineyards neighboring the city: from Belleville, Montmartre, Issy, Vanves. Wine merchants were regulated and taxed by the royal government beginning in 1121. Better-quality wines arrived in the city between September through November from Champagne, Burgundy, and Orléans.

=== Sounds and smells ===
The narrow medieval streets of Paris were extremely noisy, with crowds of people and animals moving along between three- and four-story-high houses. The chief form of advertising for the street merchants was shouting; one of the regulations of Paris listed in the Livre des métiers was that street merchants were forbidden to shout at customers being served by other street merchants or to criticize the goods sold by other merchants. Street merchants went door to door selling fish, fruits, vegetables, cheese, milk, chickens, garlic, onions, clothing, and countless other products. Competing with these were mendicants begging for alms, and flocks of sheep, pigs, and cows being driven to the markets.

Official news and announcements were made to the Parisians by the guild of town criers, who were first chartered by the king, and then put under the authority of the League of River Merchants. They had their own patron saint and holiday. There were twenty-four members of the guild recorded at one time in Paris, and all merchants and other persons were required to be silent when the crier was making an announcement.

The smells of Paris were also varied and unavoidable. In winter, the overwhelming smell was burning wood and charcoal used for heating and cooking. Year round, the streets smelled strongly of unwashed persons, animals, and human and animal waste products. Chamber pots of urine were routinely emptied out of windows onto the street. Along with fears of an uprising of the turbulent Parisians, the smells and bad air of central Paris were a major reason why Charles V moved the royal residence permanently from the Île de la Cité outside the old city walls to a new residence, the Hotel Saint-Pol, near the new Bastille fortress.

=== Festivities and processions ===
The calendar of Parisians in the Middle Ages was filled with holidays and events that were widely and enthusiastically celebrated, perhaps because of the precarious lives of the ordinary populace. In addition to holidays for Christmas, Easter, Pentecost and Ascension, each of the guilds and corporations of the city had its own patron saint and celebrated that saint's feast day. The unmarried clerks of the royal palace had their own corporation, La Basoche, which celebrated its own holiday with a parade, farces and satirical theatrical productions. The day of Sainte-Geneviève, the patron saint of the city, had an especially large celebration, with pilgrimages and processions. Some holidays with origins in pagan times were also marked, such as New Year's and the Summer solstice, which was the occasion for huge bonfires called the Fire of Saint Jean. A special event in the royal family – a coronation, birth, baptism, marriage, or simply the entry of the king or queen into the city – was usually the occasion for a public celebration.

Large and colorful processions frequently took place to mark special days or events, such as a military victory, or ask for God's protection in the event of a flood or an outbreak of the plague. The most important annual procession took place on the Day of Saint Denis; it proceeded from the Châtelet fortress to the Basilica of Saint-Denis and was led by the Bishop of Paris and the clergy of Paris, followed by the members of religious orders and representatives of all the guilds and professions of the city. A similar procession took place from the Montagne Sainte-Geneviève on the Left Bank to Saint-Denis, including the students and faculty of the University.

=== Hospitals ===
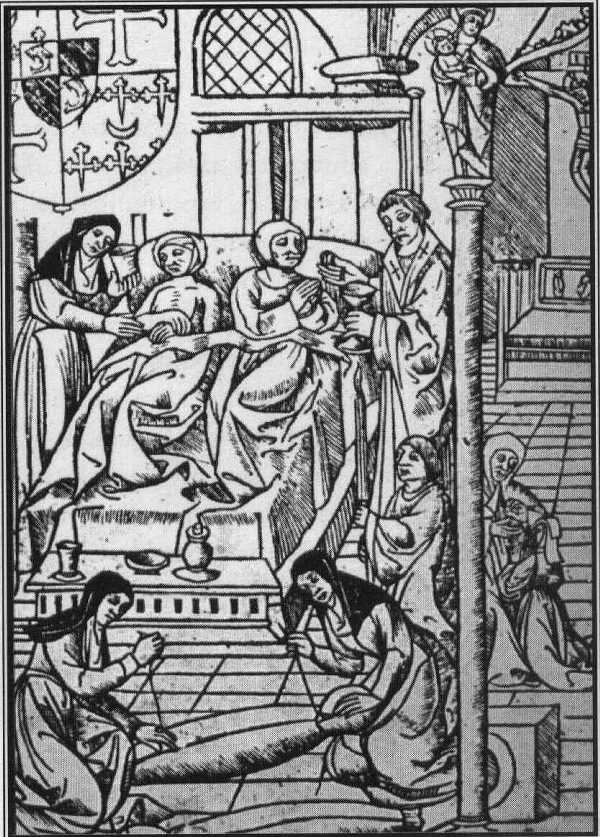
Patients in the Hôtel Dieu in about 1500. it was common to have two, three or even four patients share a bed.

According to tradition, the first Paris hospital, the Hôtel Dieu, was founded in 651 by Saint Landry, the Bishop of Paris. It was first mentioned in texts in 829. It was located on the southern side of the Île de la Cité between the river and the parvis of Notre Dame, which gave it direct access to the river for drinking water, washing sheets, disposing of waste, and transporting patients. It was staffed by religious orders and was usually crowded, with two or three patients in a bed. Medical care as we know it today was minimal, but patients did receive careful attention, food, water, clean sheets, and there were regular religious services every day.

The 12th century and 13th saw the founding of several new hospitals sponsored by religious orders and wealthy families: the Hospital of Saint-Gervais in 1171, the Hospital of the Trinity in 1210, and the Hospital of Saint Catherine in 1188. Later in the Middle Ages, there were hospitals founded specially for destitute women, repented prostitutes and poor widows. They also served to provide employment as nurses or maids for women arriving from the provinces. Leprosy arrived in Paris after the Crusades, due to the contacts with the infected areas in the eastern Mediterranean and the movements of population. By 1124, King Louis VII established a large leprosarium in the Rue du Faubourg Saint-Denis. Between 1254 and 1260, Louis IX built a special hospital for three hundred poor blind patients near the Porte Saint-Honoré on the Wall of Charles V. In 1363, the corporation of merchants of Paris founded a home for poor orphans, the Hospice du Saint-Esprit, on the Place de Grève.

== Architecture and urbanism ==
=== The birth of Gothic style ===
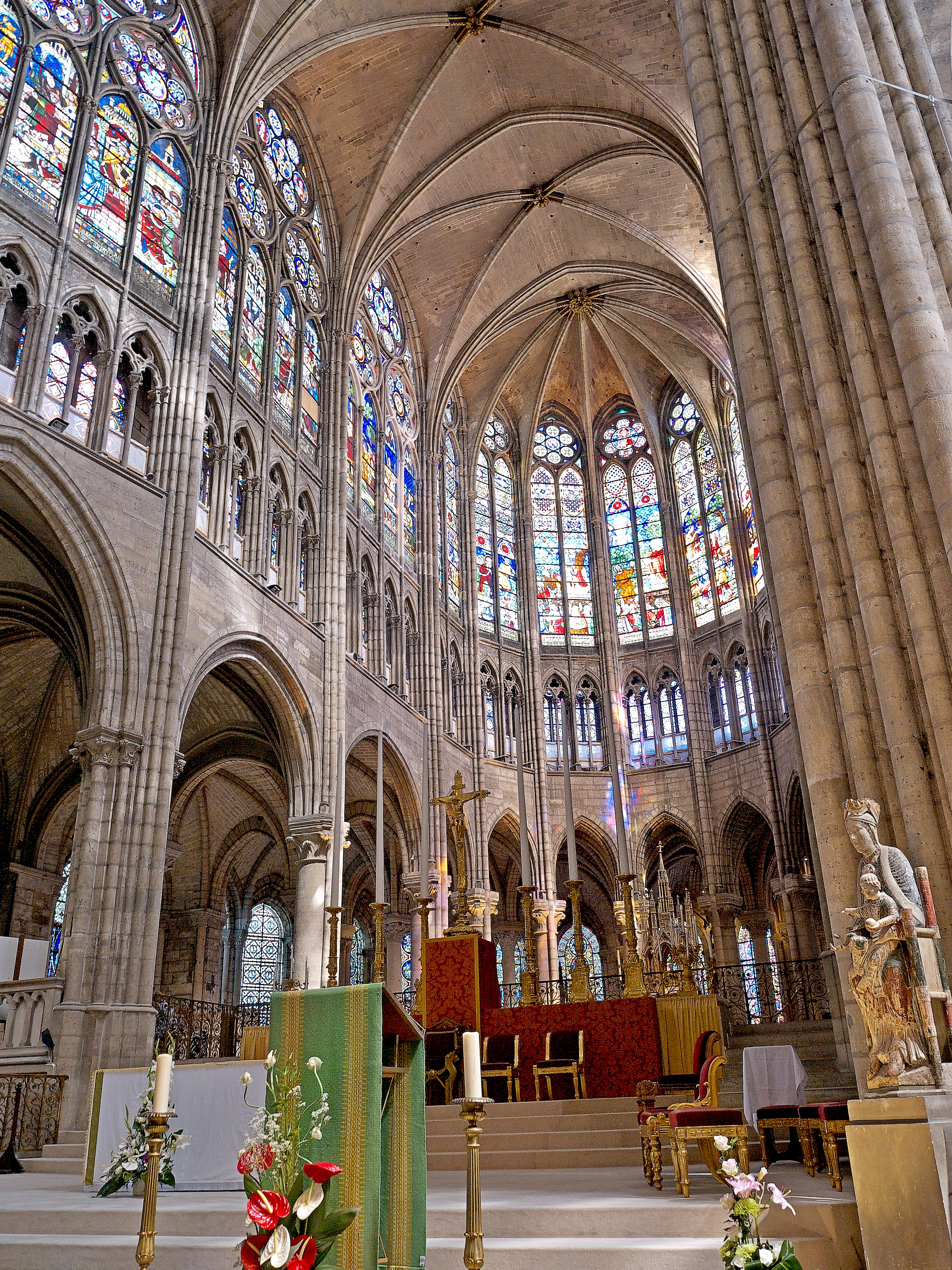
The choir of the Basilica of Saint-Denis flooded with light from stained glass windows (built 1140-1144)

The flourishing of religious architecture in Paris was largely the work of Suger, the abbot of Saint-Denis from 1122 to 1151 and advisor to Kings Louis VI and Louis VII. He rebuilt the façade of the old Carolingian Basilica of Saint Denis, dividing it into three horizontal levels and three vertical sections to symbolize the Holy Trinity. Then, from 1140 to 1144, he rebuilt the rear of the church with a majestic and dramatic wall of stained glass windows that flooded the church with light. This style, later designated Gothic, was copied by other Paris churches: the Priory of Saint-Martin-des-Champs, Saint-Pierre de Montmartre, and Saint-Germain-des-Prés, and quickly spread to England and Germany.

In the 13th century, King Louis IX specially built a masterpiece of Gothic Art, the Sainte-Chapelle, to house relics from the Crucifixion of Jesus. Built between 1241 and 1248, it has the oldest stained glass windows remaining in Paris. At the same time that the Saint-Chapelle was built, stained glass rose windows, eighteen meters high, were added to the transept of Notre Dame Cathedral.

=== The town house ===
Beginning in the reign of Charles VI (1380–1422), French noblemen and wealthy merchants began building large townhouses, mostly in the Le Marais neighborhood that were usually surrounded by walls and often had gardens. King Charles and Queen Isabeau of Bavaria spent most of their time in their own house in that neighborhood, the Hôtel Saint-Pol, which had been built by Charles V. Louis d'Orléans, the brother of the Charles VI, had nine separate residences in the city, including the Hôtel des Tournelles, whose site became the Place des Vosges in about 1600. The Duke de Berry had eleven Paris residences; his preferred house was the Hôtel de Nesle on the Left Bank opposite the Île de la Cité, which used part of the old fortifications built by Philip II and which possessed a large gallery overlooking the Seine. Magnificent town houses were built between 1485 and 1510 for the Abbot of the Cluny Monastery; one of them is now the Museum of the Middle Ages. The Hôtel de Sens, the residence of the archbishop of Sens from 1490, has towers at the corners and flanking the entrance in the manner of a medieval château.

The private houses of the wealthy were often built of stone, but the great majority of houses in Paris were built of wood beams and plaster. Plaster was abundant thanks to the gypsum mines of Montmartre, and its widespread use prevented large-scale fires of the kind that destroyed many medieval neighborhoods. The interiors were covered with plaster plaques, and the roofs covered with tile; only the wealthy could afford slate roofs. The oldest surviving house in Paris is the house of Nicolas Flamel (1407), located at 51 Rue de Montmorency. It was not a private home, but a hostel for the poor.

=== Streets ===
The major crossroads of medieval Paris was the intersection of the Grand-Rue Saint-Martin and the Grand-Rue Saint-Honoré; under Philip II, these were also among the first streets in the city to be paved with stones. According to a plan drawn up in 1222, the Rue Saint-Honoré was just six meters wide, enough room for two carriages to pass each other. The owners of houses along the streets, not wanting their houses to be scraped by passing carts and wagons, often put stone blocks, benches and shelters in the street that made them even narrower. Later in the Middle Ages, the widest streets in Paris were the Rue Saint-Antoine, which was twenty meters wide, and the Rue Saint-Honoré, which was widened to fifteen meters. Some passageways in the heart of the city were only sixty centimeters wide, barely room for two persons to pass.

The streets typically had a narrow channel down the center to carry away rainwater and waste water. Upper floors of houses were wider than the ground floor and overhung the street; residents often dumped their waste water out the window down the street. Flocks of animals also frequently filled the streets. The houses on the streets had no numbers; they were usually identified by colorful signs that created additional obstacles for passers-by.

=== Bridges ===
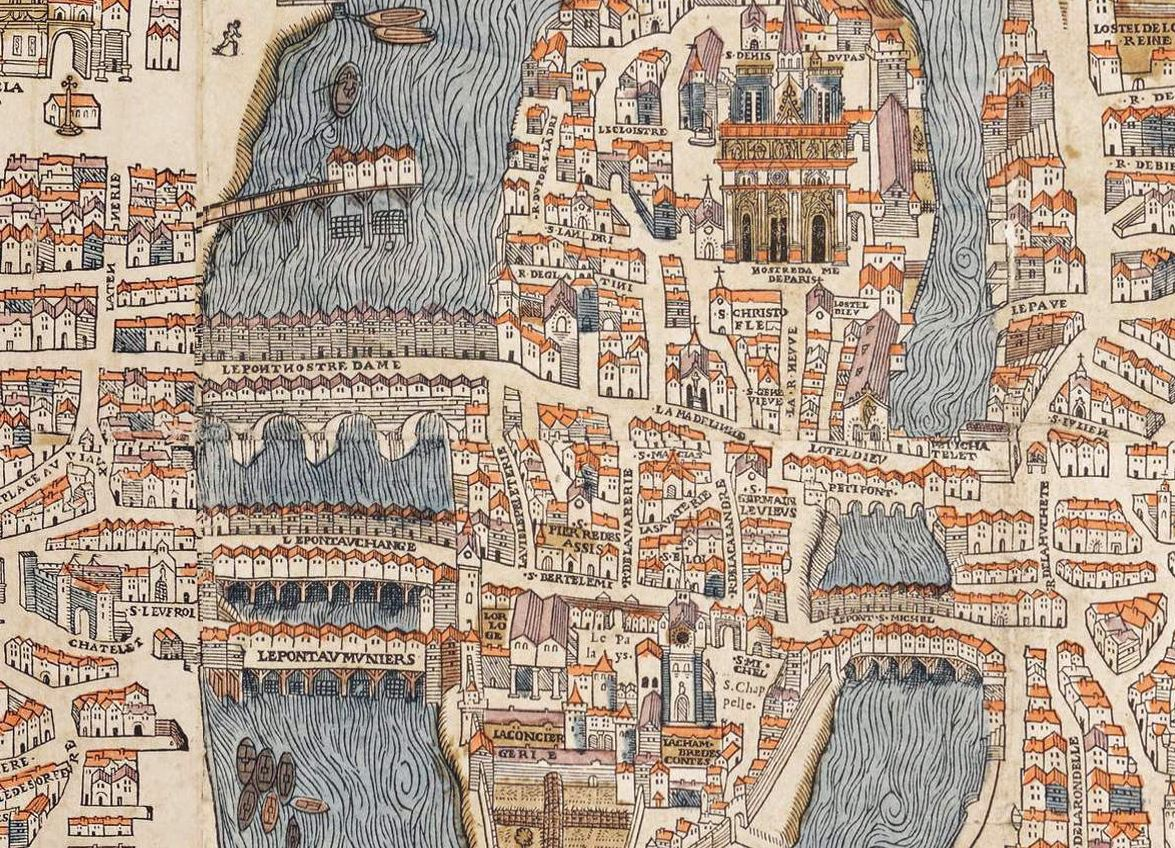
The bridges of Paris in 1550

The first two bridges in Paris were built by the Parisii in the third century BC to connect the Île-de-la-Cité to the Left and Right Bank of the Seine. They were burned by the Parisii themselves in an unsuccessful effort to defend the city against the Romans. They were rebuilt by the Romans, then regularly destroyed and replaced over the centuries in almost the same locations. The first Grand Pont was built by Charles V just to the west of the modern Pont au Change. It was carried away by the river in 1280, and rebuilt in stone, with houses on either side. The medieval Petit Pont was on the same location as the modern bridge of that name, at the beginning of the Rue Saint-Jacques. In 1296, a flood washed away both of the bridges. The Grand Pont was reconstructed just to the east of the earlier bridge, and in 1304, Philip IV had the money changers installed in houses along the bridge, giving the bridge the name Pont au Changeurs, or Pont au Change. The Petit Pont was rebuilt on its old site.

The original Grand Point included several grain mills to take advantage of the flow of water through its arches. When the Grand Pont was rebuilt in its new location, the mills were rebuilt under the arches of the old bridge, which transformed into a new footbridge called the Pont aux Meuniers, or bridge of the millers. At the beginning of the 14th century, a new bridge was built to connect the island to the Rue Saint-Martin. It was replaced in 1413 by a new wooden bridge, the Pont Notre-Dame. That bridge washed away in 1499 and was rebuilt in stone between 1500 and 1514 with sixty-eight houses of brick and stone positioned on top of it.

The construction of a new stone bridge, the Pont Saint-Michel, was decided upon in 1378. A location downstream of the Petit-Pont was chosen on the line of the Rue Saint-Denis from the Grand-Pont on the Right Bank and the Rue de la Harpe on the Left Bank. This allowed for a direct route across the Île de la Cité. Construction lasted from 1379 until 1387. Once complete, the Parisians named the bridge the "Pont-Neuf" (New Bridge). The bridge's sides were quickly filled with houses. It was first occupied largely by dyers (fripiers) and tapestry-weavers, and later, in the 17th century, by perfume makers and booksellers. During the winter of 1407–1408, it was destroyed by river ice and rebuilt.

=== Water ===
In the Middle Ages, the water of the Seine was polluted with waste from butchers, tanners, decomposing corpses in cemeteries, and animal and human waste. Wealthy Parisians, the monasteries, and the royal palace had their own wells, usually in the basements of their buildings. Ordinary Parisians took their water from one of the three city public fountains that existed in 1292 or paid one of the fifty-five water porters registered in that year to carry water from the fountains to their residence. Many Parisians took the risk and drank the water from the river.

Public bathing was common in medieval Paris, and there were about twenty-six public baths in Paris in 1272.

=== Sewers ===
The ancient Gallo-Roman town of Lutetia had an efficient sewer along what is now the Boulevard Saint-Michel, but it was ruined and abandoned in the third century AD. In the medieval period, the few paved streets had small channels in the center for waste water and rain. They ran downhill into two larger open sewers, and then either to the Seine or to the moats of the fortifications built by Charles V. Documents from 1325 record a sewer called the "Sewer of the Bishop" on the Île de la Cité that ran beneath the Hôtel Dieu into the Seine. A more ambitious covered sewer, three hundred meters long, was built in 1370 from the Rue Montmartre to the moat of the city walls. Another covered sewer was built along the Rue Saint-Antoine toward the Bastille; it had to be diverted to the modern Rue de Turenne in 1413 because it passed too close to the residence of King Charles VI at the Hôtel Saint-Pol, and the aroma disturbed the king and his court. The city did not have an efficient system of covered sewers until Napoleon built them at the beginning of the 19th century.

=== Street lighting ===
Street lighting was almost nonexistent in the Middle Ages. In 1318, it was recorded that there were just three street lanterns in Paris: one candle in a lantern outside the entrance to the Châtelet fortress; a candle outside the Tour de Nesle to indicate its entrance to boatmen; and a third lantern outside the Cemetery of the Innocents to remind passers-by to pray for the souls of the deceased. Very little light came from houses, since glass windows were extremely rare; most windows were closed with wooden shutters. The wealthy lighted the streets at night with servants carrying torches.

== The arts ==
=== Illuminated manuscripts and painting ===
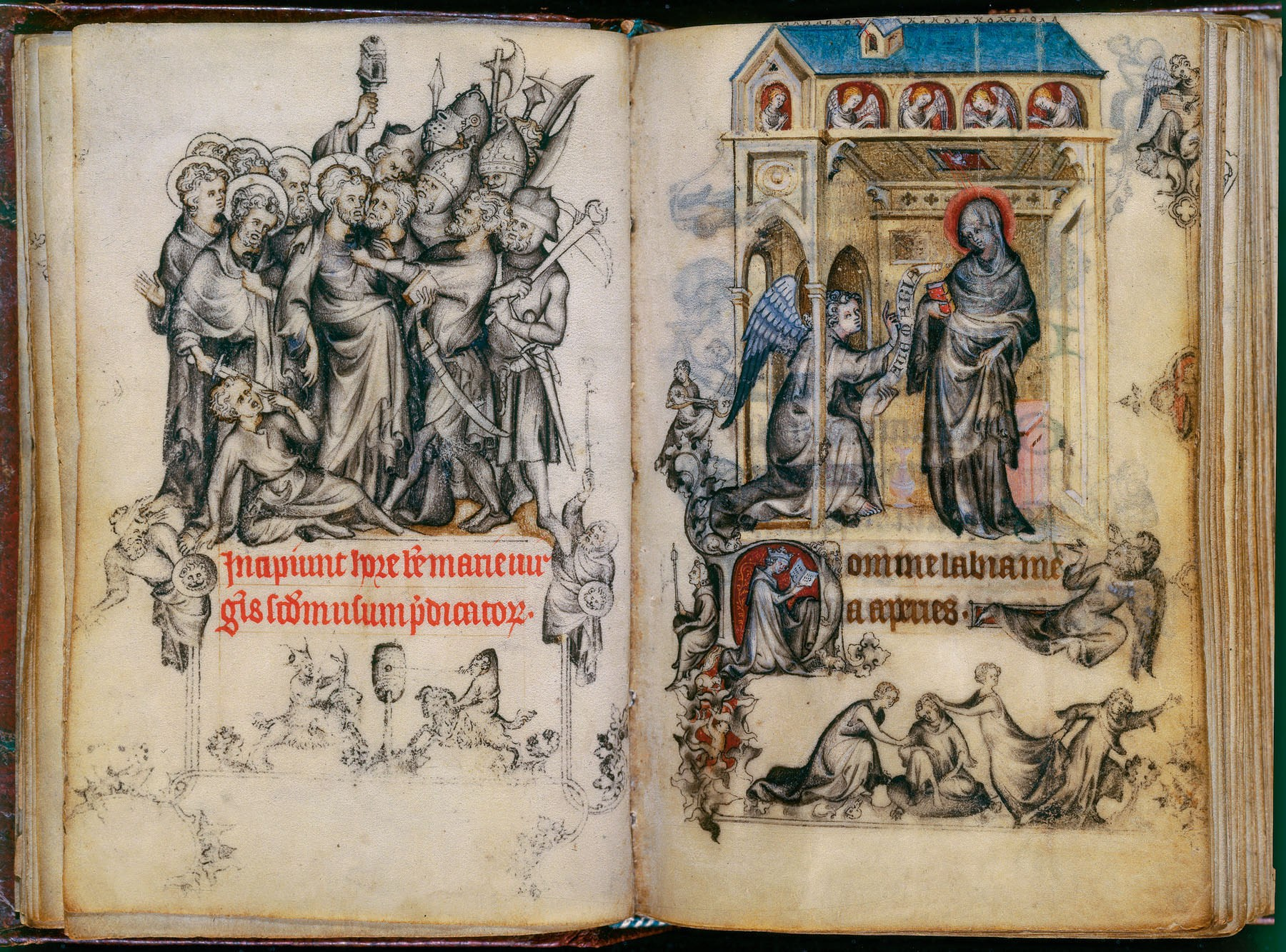
The Book of Hours of Jeanne d'Evreux, by Jean Pucelle (1325–1328).

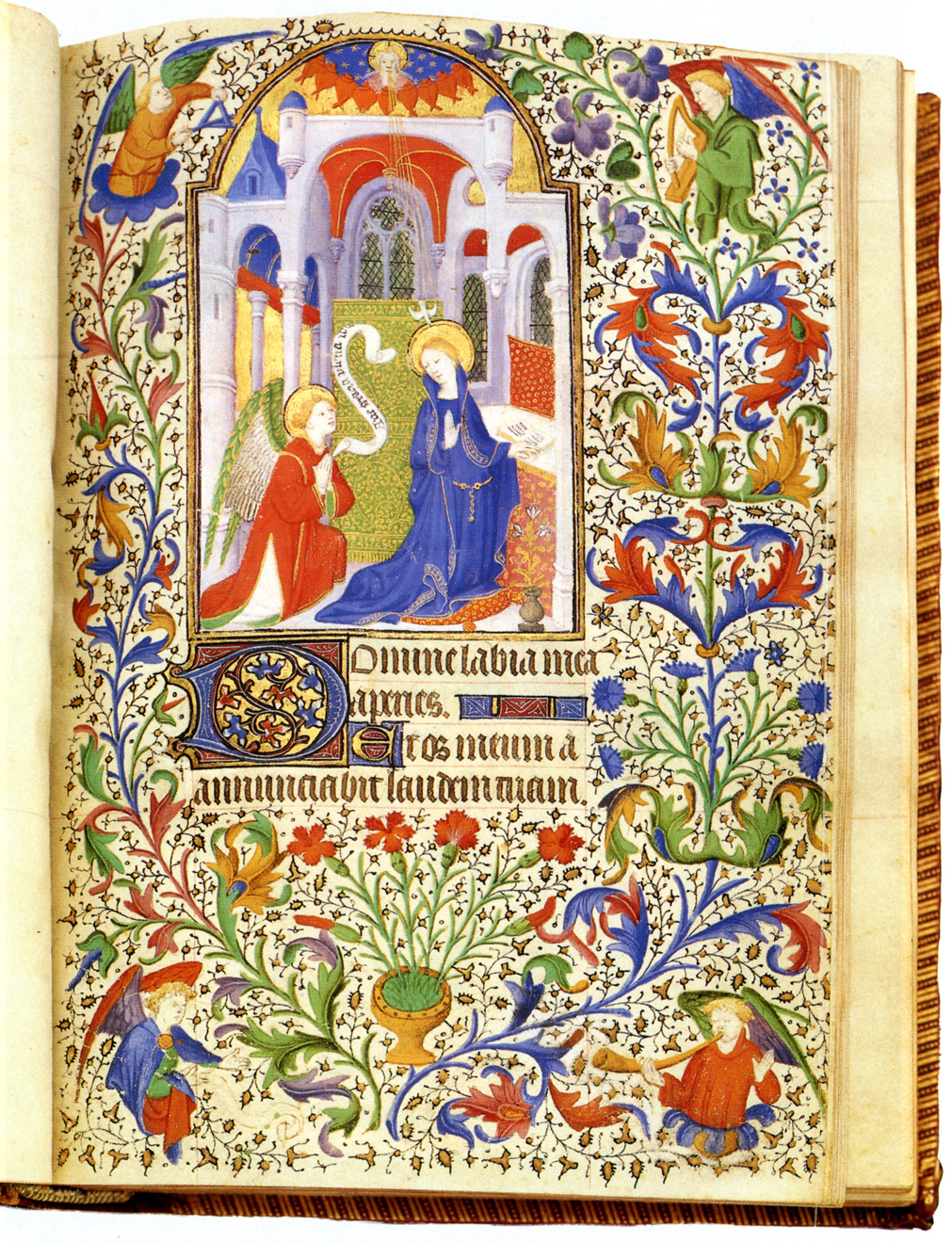
A Book of Hours from Paris (about 1410)

The first illuminated manuscripts in Paris began to be produced in workshops in the 11th century. At first, they were created by monks in the abbeys, particularly Saint-Denis, Saint-Maur-des-Fossés, Notre-Dame and Saint-Germain-des-Prés. The first recognized artist of the period was the monk Ingelard, who painted miniatures at the Abbey of Saint-Germain-des-Prés between 1030 and 1060. By the 13th century, a particular Paris style had emerged that could be seen in manuscripts, stained glass windows, and even architecture: a complex arrangement of medallions, clear contours, warm and deep shades of color, and faces that were usually depicted without color. As the Middle Ages progressed and the illuminated works became more valuable, they began to be produced by noted artists in workshops for the court and for the wealthy merchants. One notable example is the Hours of Jeanne d'Evreux, named for the third wife of King Charles IV, that were made by Jean Pucelle between 1325 and 1328.

The painters of Paris, called imagers-paintres, were members of the same guild or corporation as the illuminators and the sculptors; there were twenty-nine painters enrolled in the guild in 1329. In the 14th and 15th centuries, many of the painters came from Flanders and the north and worked for the courts of Duke John of Berry at Bourges and the Duke of Burgundy, as well as for clients in Paris. Among the most celebrated artists were the Limbourg Brothers, who produced the Très Riches Heures du Duc de Berry, and Jean Fouquet, who illustrated the history of France for his royal patrons.

=== Sculpture ===
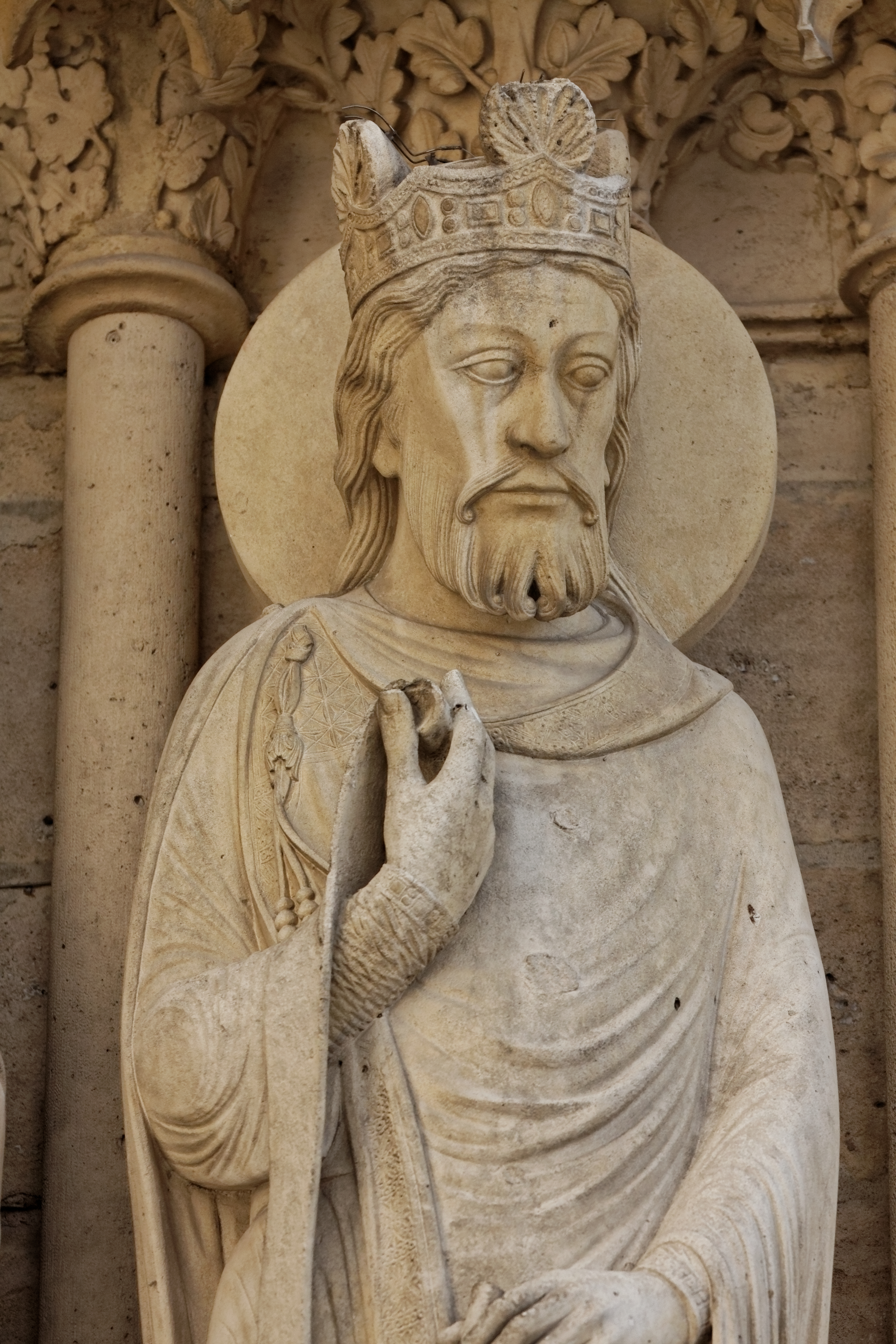
A sculpture from the Portal of Saint Anne of the Cathedral of Notre Dame

The art of sculpture, practiced in Paris since Roman times, reached a summit during the Middle Ages in the decoration of the Cathedral of Notre Dame, particularly in the sculptures above the portals on the western facade. Sculptors were known as imagiers or tombiers, since they often made tombs. The timpanium, or arch-shaped ensemble of sculptures over the central door, portrayed the Virgin and Child enthroned and surrounded by saints. It was made about 1170 in a more traditional style taken from older churches in the Auvergne. The Portal of Saint Anne, built later, was in a more realistic and distinctively Parisian style; the face of each figure reflects an individualized and naturalistic depiction.

Other important works of sculpture were created for the tombs of the French Kings in the Abbey of Saint-Denis. The sculptor Jean de Liège, from Flanders, sculpted images of Charles V and Jeanne de Bourbon for the château of the Louvre, as well as several tombs for members of the royal family at Saint Denis.

=== Stained glass ===
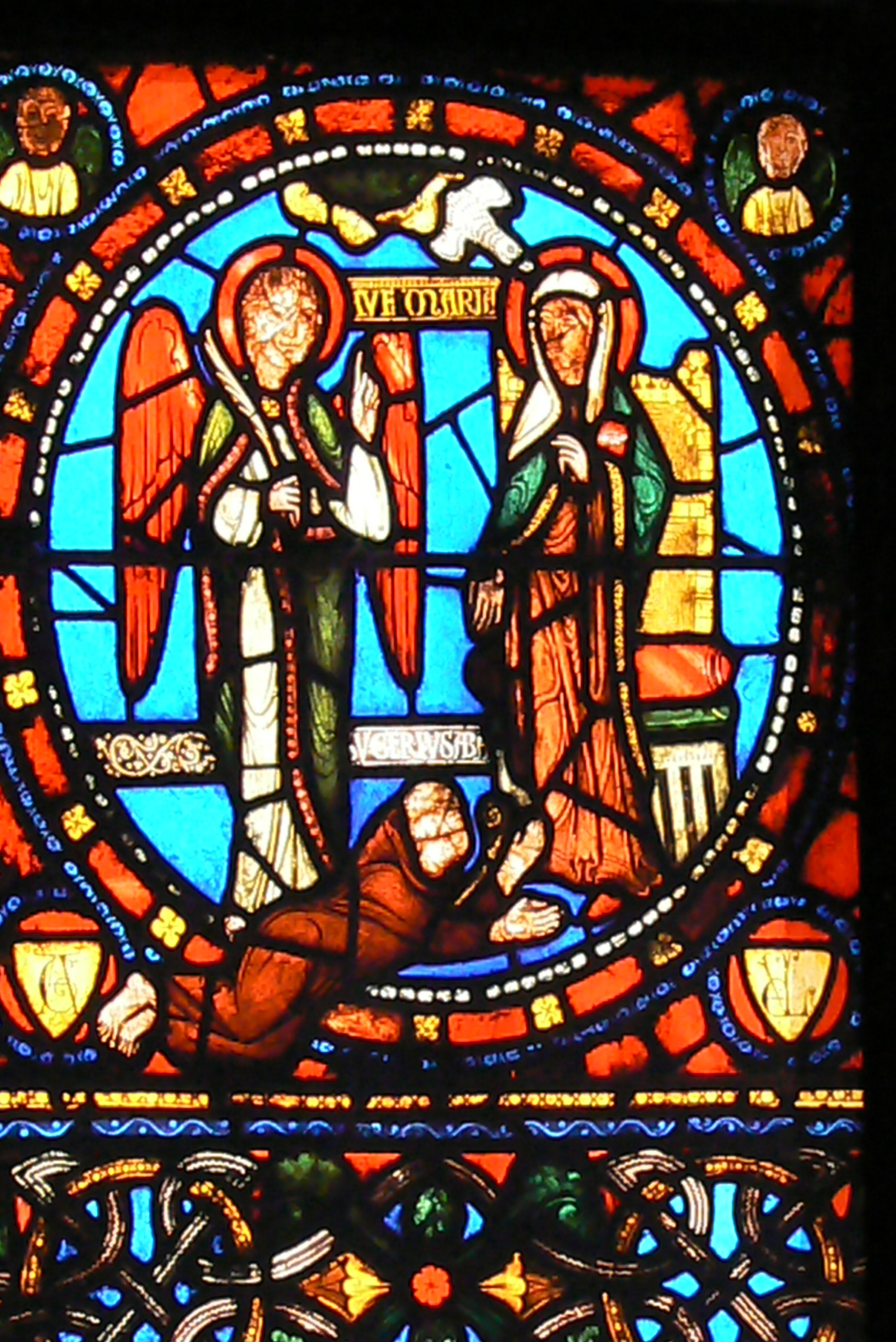
Stained glass in the Basilica of Saint-Denis (12th century)

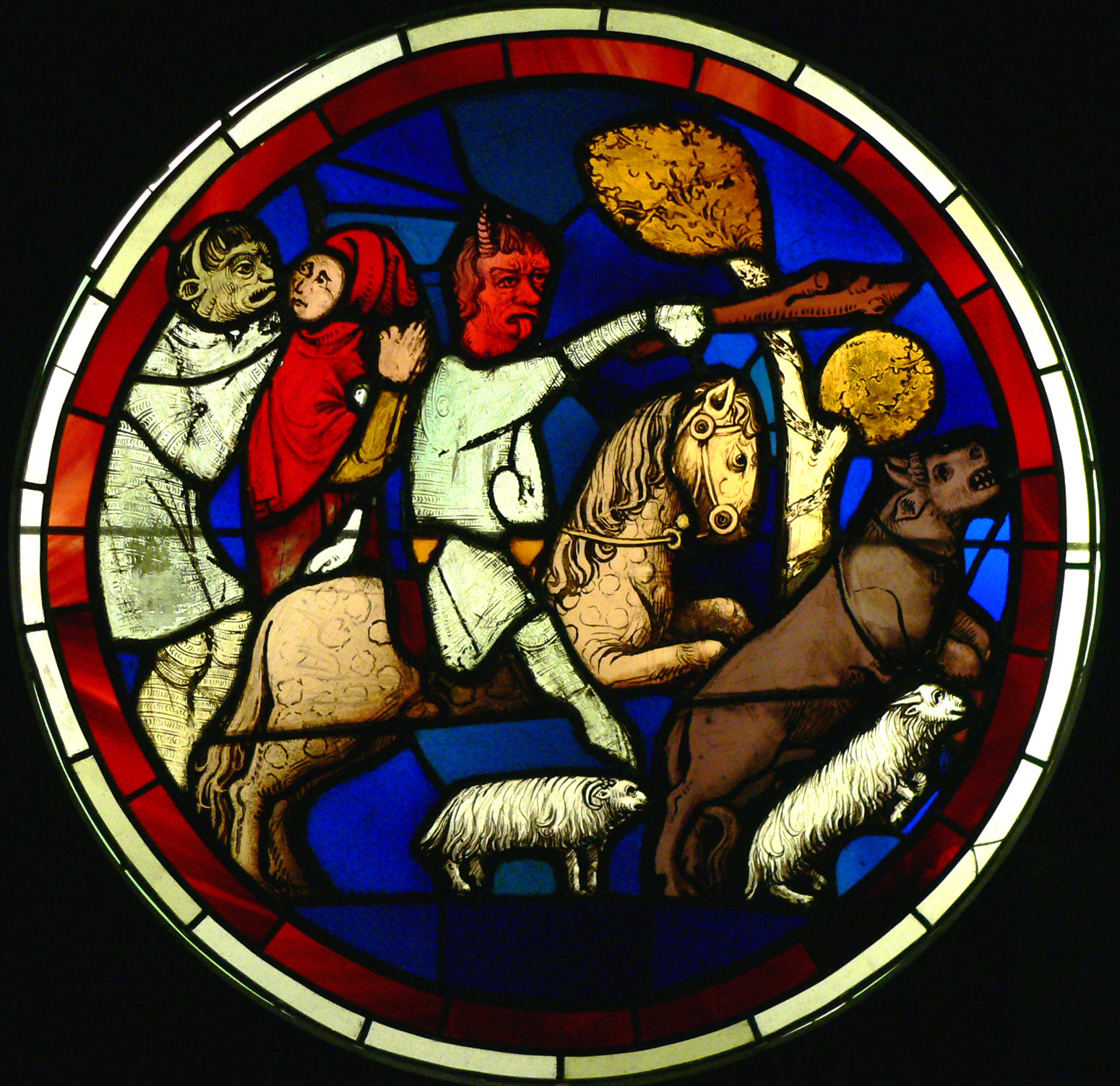
A stained glass medallion from the royal chapel of the Sainte-Chapelle (before 1248)

Stained glass, or vitrail, the use of small plaques of colored glass joined by lead to depict historic events and figures, was not invented in Paris. It was recorded in texts in other parts of Europe in the late 9th century, but in Paris of the 12th and 13th centuries, it reached new heights of drama and artistry. Advancements in architecture, particularly at the Abbey of Saint-Denis and the Cathedral of Notre Dame, allowed stone walls to be replaced by walls of stained glass that flooded churches with colored light. In medieval theology, light was considered divine, and the windows gave a theological and moral message, particularly since most people attending church could not read. The smaller windows, closer to the viewer, told familiar bible stories. The larger and higher windows were devoted to images of saints and patriarchs, while the immense rose windows on the transepts or facades of the churches portrayed epic stories; the last judgement, or the life of the Virgin Mary.

The 12th-century windows were composed of many small medallions and used lighter colors so that the churches would not be too dark inside. In the 13th century, the colors became darker and richer as the windows became larger, for example in the royal chapel of Sainte-Chapelle. By the end of the Middle Ages, the artists of the windows had introduced more realistic effects such as perspective and spread images over more than one panel of glass. The glass became thinner and allowed more light to enter. Often the details of the images were painted on the glass or were surrounded by frames of clear glass. The windows of the upper chapel of Sainte-Chapelle today contain the oldest medieval windows still in place in the city; portions of other original windows can be seen in the Cluny Museum of the Middle Ages.

== Events ==
=== Plague, war, and rebellions ===
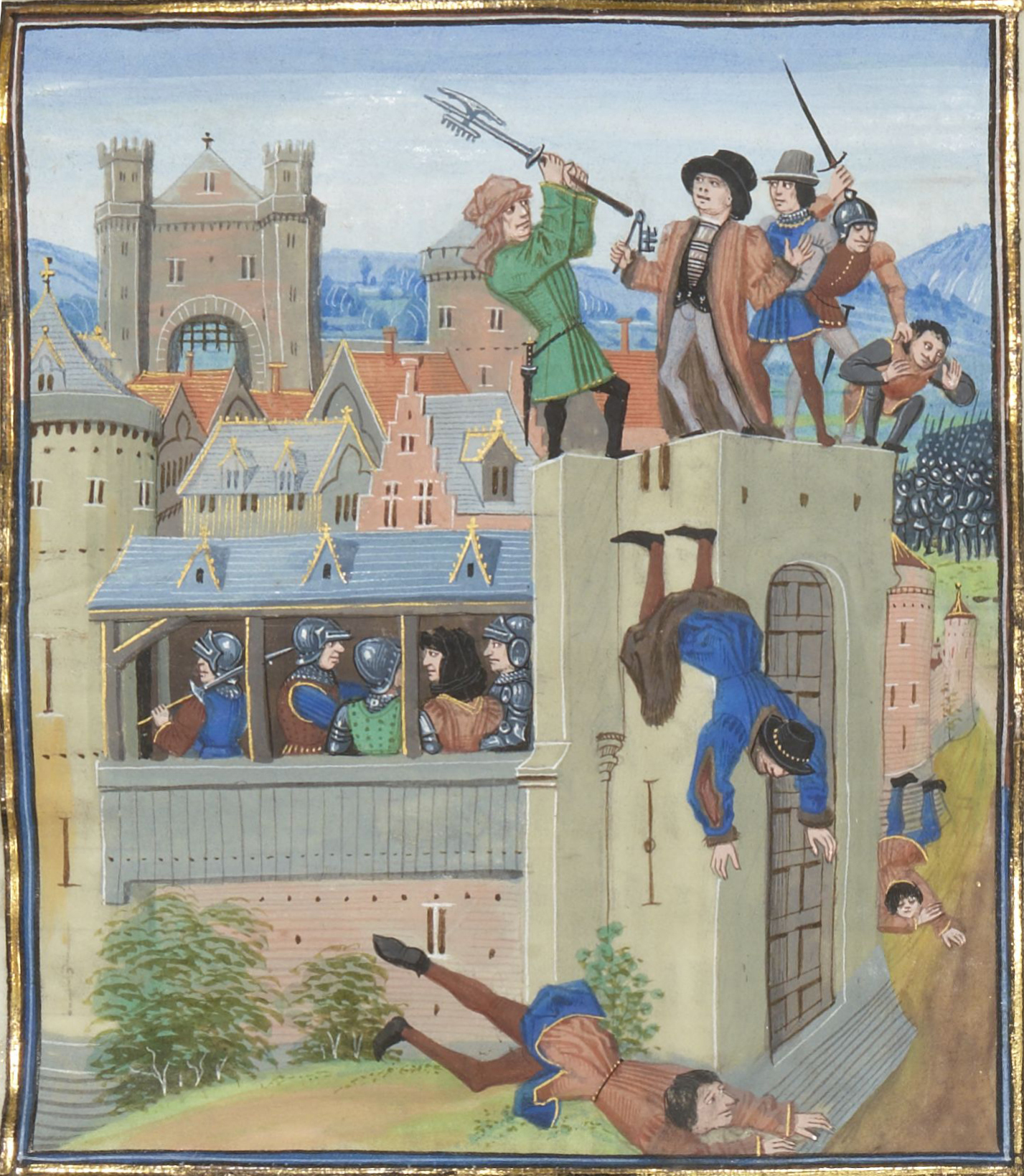
The assassination of Étienne Marcel in 1358 by Jean Froissard

In the late 13th and early 14th centuries, tensions began to emerge between the Parisians and the royal government. Philip II granted the merchants monopolies and a role in the administration of the city, but he also expected them to pay for the privilege with taxes and fees. Between 1293 and 1300, Philip IV began collecting taxes on all commercial transactions and the transport of goods. In 1306, when the king revalued the French currency, rents tripled; the Parisians rioted and sacked the house of the provost of the merchants, who collected the rents. Twenty-eight rioters were arrested, tried and hanged at the gates of the city.

In the middle of the 14th century, Paris was struck by two great catastrophes: the Bubonic plague and the Hundred Years' War. In the first epidemic of the plague in 1348–1349, forty to fifty thousand Parisians died, a quarter of the population. The plague returned in 1360–61, 1363, and 1366–1368.

The Hundred Years' War between France and England, which began in 1337, brought new woes to the Parisians. In 1356, the King John II was captured by the English at the Battle of Poitiers. The Dauphin, the future Charles V, was named regent and tried to raise money to pay ransom for his father. He summoned the Estates-General and asked for the coins of Paris to be devalued in order to put more money into the treasury. The provost of the merchants, Étienne Marcel, a prosperous cloth merchant who represented Paris in the Estates-General, refused and demanded a role for the Estates General. When the Dauphin refused, Marcel organized strikes and riots until the Dauphin was forced to concede powers to the Estates-General. The Dauphin was obliged to wear a red and blue cap, the colors of the city of Paris. The followers of Marcel killed two of the counselors of the Dauphin, but Marcel stopped the rioters from killing the Dauphin. The Dauphin escaped Paris, raised an army, and laid siege to Paris. The followers of Marcel gradually abandoned him, and, hoping for royal pardon, killed him in 1358 by throwing him from the walls at the Porte Saint-Antoine. The king and royal government returned to the city, and the powers of the provost of the Paris merchants were drastically reduced; until the French Revolution, it became only a symbolic office.

=== The Civil War between the Burgundians and the Armagnacs ===
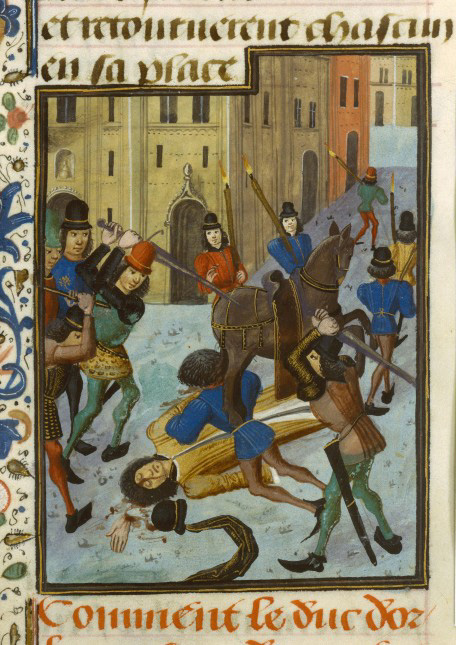
The assassination in Paris of Louis I, Duke of Orléans, in 1407 set off a civil war between Burgundians and Armagnacs

Beginning in 1392, King Charles VI began to show increasing signs of madness. Two princes of the royal family, Louis I, Duke of Orléans, the younger brother of the king, and John the Fearless, Duke of Burgundy, began a battle for the control of Paris. On 23 November 1407, Louis of Orléans was murdered on the streets of Paris by agents of the duke of Burgundy, who took over the royal administration. The son of the murdered duke, Charles of Orléans, pretended to accept the Burgundians, but quietly assembled a coalition of other nobles, including the Dukes of Berry and Bourbon, the count of Alençon, and the count of Armagnac. They became known as the Armagnacs. Their feud turned into the Armagnac–Burgundian Civil War.

Paris was soon divided into two hostile parties. The Orléans party, or Armagnacs, had many followers in the royal administration and treasury, whereas supporters of the duke of Burgundy had a strong following within the University of Paris. In 1408, university scholars in prepared an elaborate scholarly justification for the murder of Louis of Orléans. The corporations of artisans also took sides; the butchers, one of the largest and most powerful guilds, gave their support to the Burgundians, and were rewarded with patronage, influence and large casks of Burgundy wine.

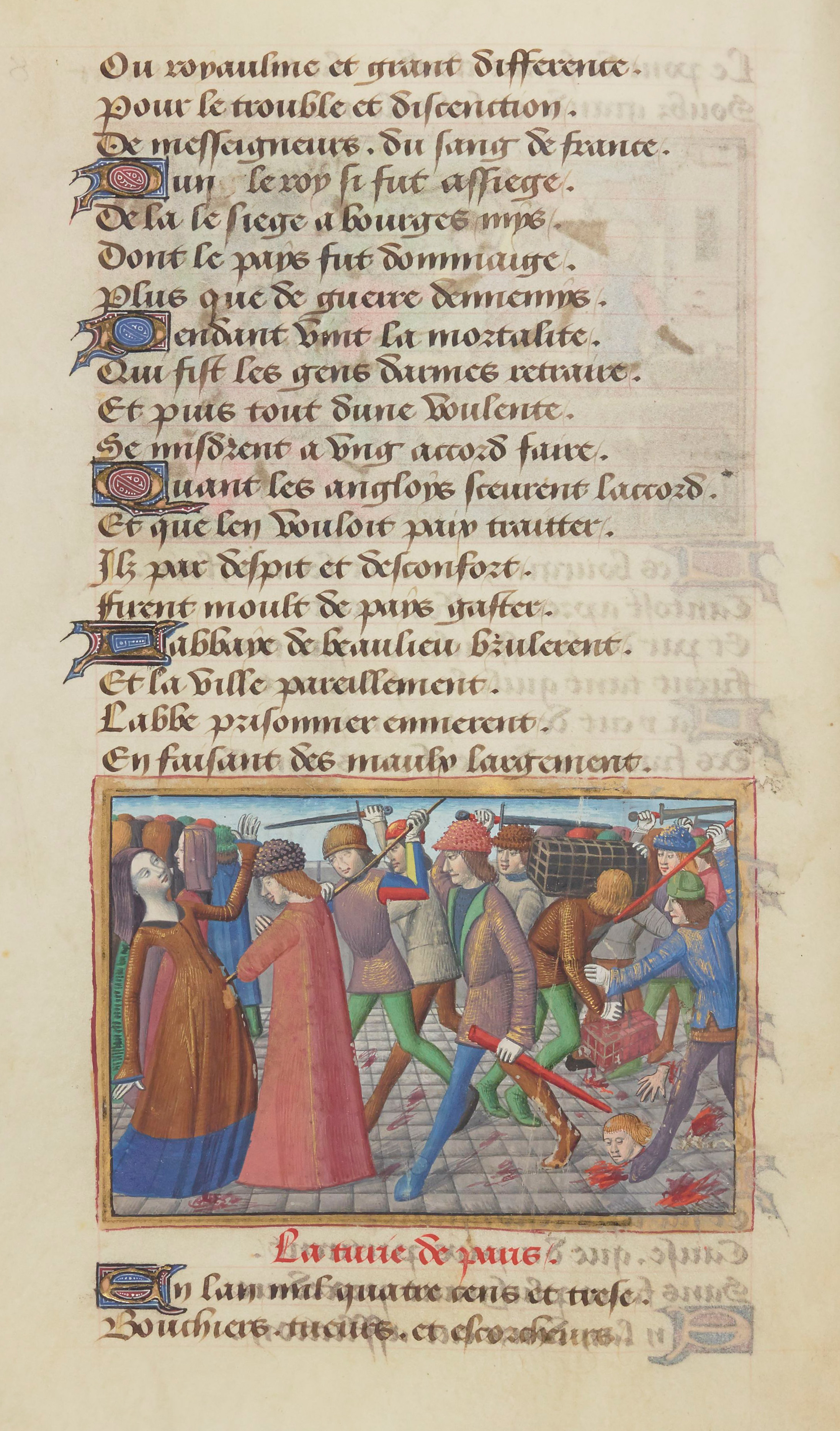
A depiction of the massacre of Parisians during the Cabochien Revolt of 1413 from Les Vigiles de Charles VII (1484)

In April 1413, after much political maneuvering, the Burgundians inspired a new strike against the Armagnacs that resulted in the Cabochien Revolt: several thousand working-class Parisians recruited by the Burgundians and known as Cabochians stormed through the streets to attack or arrest known supporters of the Armagnac Party. They invaded the houses of Queen Isabeau of Bavaria and other persons close to the Dauphin. The Burgundians soon lost control of the movement they had sponsored; members of the government and army were arrested and imprisoned and their places taken by Cabochians. The Cabochians demanded large payments from wealthy Parisians, and a reign of terror and assassination took hold of the city. A reaction against the excesses of the Cabochians and the Burgundians followed. Soldiers recruited by the merchants of Paris took control of the streets, Armagnac soldiers entered the city and the leaders of the Cabochians fled Paris along with John the Fearless, the leader of the Burgundians. The Armagnacs imposed strict surveillance of the Parisians; the guild of butchers, supporters of the Burgundians, was stripped of its status, and its headquarters, the chief slaughterhouse, was demolished.

The city was soon threatened from a new direction. In October 1415, the English army defeated the French at the Battle of Agincourt and marched toward Paris. John the Fearless made new efforts to recapture the city in 1414, 1415 and 1417, all without success, but during the night of 28–29 May 1418, his forces were able to enter quietly and seize the city with the aid of allies inside. Arrests and massacres followed, with some three to four hundred persons killed, including Bernard VII, Count of Armagnac.

=== The English and Burgundian Occupation ===
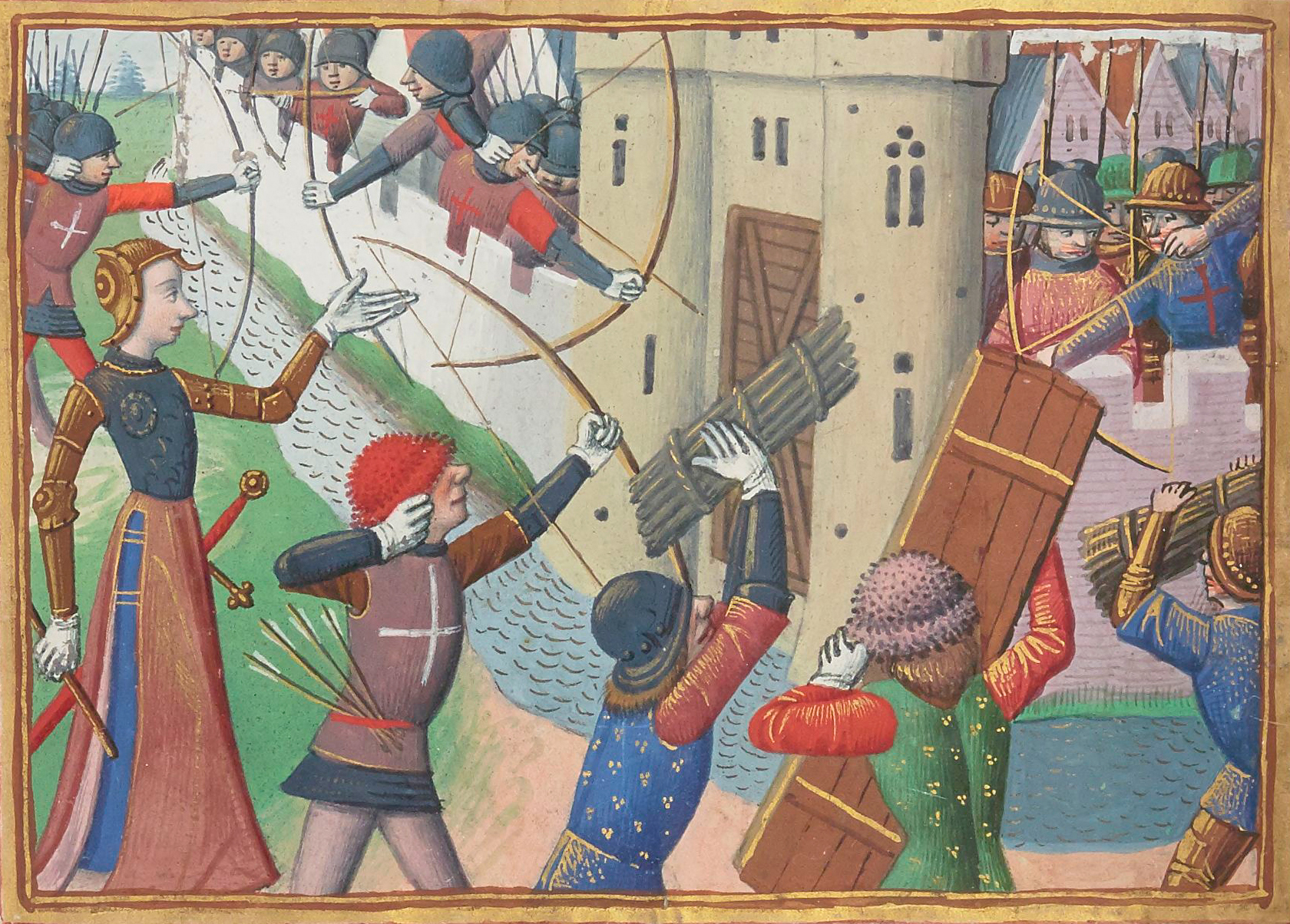
Joan of Arc at the Siege of Paris (1429)

In 1420, King Charles VI was compelled by the Treaty of Troyes to accept the English king, Henry V, as the regent and rightful heir to the French throne. On 21 May and 30 May, the merchants of Paris and the faculty of the University took an oath to respect English rule. The English occupation force in Paris was small, only about two hundred men stationed in the Bastille, the Louvre and the Chateau of Vincennes. They left the administration of the city to the Burgundians. Henry V of England died on 31 August 1422, and Charles VI died fifty days later. As a child, King Henry VI of England resided in Paris for only one month, for his coronation at Notre-Dame in December 1431.

The new king of France, Charles VII, only ruled territories in France south of the Loire River. When Joan of Arc tried to liberate Paris on 8 September 1429, the Parisian merchant class joined with the English and Burgundians to keep her out. She was wounded and captured soon afterwards, then put on trial by the English; a tribunal of scholars from the University of Paris judged her guilty and called for her swift execution. English occupation of Paris lasted until 1436. After a series of French victories, the Burgundians changed sides, the English were allowed to depart, and Charles VII was finally able to return to the capital. Many neighborhoods were in ruins; a hundred thousand people, half the population, had left.

=== The end of the Middle Ages ===
After the departure of the English, Paris became France's capital once again, but throughout the rest of the 15th century, French monarchs chose to live in the Loire Valley, returning to Paris only on special occasions. King Francis I finally returned the royal residence to Paris in 1528, and thereafter, Paris gradually made the transition from the Middle Ages to the Renaissance. The old Pont Notre-Dame collapsed in 1499. To build a new bridge, an Italian architect who had worked on the Renaissance-style châteaux at Amboise and Blois, Giovanni Giocondo, was brought to Paris, and he constructed the new bridge with rows of houses all in the same style, one of the first examples of Renaissanace urbanism in Paris. The old Louvre fortress was finally demolished and replaced by a palace in the Renaissance style. There were also other important signs of change; the first printing press was installed in Paris in 1470, and the printed book became a major force for intellectual and cultural change.

== Chronology of major events ==
A page of the first book printed in France: the Epistolae ("Letters") of Gasparinus de Bergamo (Gasparino da Barzizza), published in 1470. The arrival of printing heralded the end of the Middle Ages and the beginning of the Renaissance

- 987 – Hugh Capet is elected King of the Franks.
- 1113 – Founding of the Abbey of Saint-Victor by Louis VI.
- 1163 – Pope Alexander III lays the cornerstone of the Cathedral of Notre-Dame-de-Paris
- 1171 – Louis VII confirms the privileges of the corporation of river merchants.
- 1190 - Philip II Augustus and his successors are onward titled as "King of France" due to rise in French identity.
- 1191–1223 – The Wall of Philip II Augustus is built around the city.
- 1194 – Construction begins on the Louvre fortress.
- 1200 – Philip II takes the students and teachers of the university under his protection.
- 1215 – Pope Innocent III gives the University of Paris its first official charter.
- 1248 – The Sainte-Chapelle is completed.
- 1254 – Foundation of the College of Sorbonne by Robert de Sorbon.
- 1314 – Jacques DeMolay, grand master of the Knights Templar, is burned at the stake on the Île de la Cité.
- 1348–49 – The Bubonic Plague strikes Paris, killing a third of the inhabitants.
- 1355 – Étienne Marcel is elected Provost of the Merchants.
- 1357 – Étienne Marcel establishes the city government in the Maison des Pilliers, on the site of the future Hôtel de Ville.
- 1358 – Étienne Marcel tries to hand over the city to the English and is assassinated.
- 1360 – The Hôtel Saint-Pol becomes the royal residence of Charles V. The Royal Palace is used for justice and administration.
- 1378 – Hugues Aubriot, Provost of Paris, has the Petit-Pont-Neuf built. It becomes the Pont Saint-Michel in 1424.
- 1407 – Charles VI purchases the Hôtel des Tournelles and makes it the royal residence.
- 1413 – Construction of the Pont Notre-Dame.
- 1418 – Burgundians occupy Paris.
- 1420 – English occupation of Paris begins.
- 1429 – Joan of Arc is wounded trying to recapture Paris.
- 1436 – The English leave Paris.
- 1470 – First printing press installed at the College of Sorbonne.
- 1498 – Louis XII enters Paris.

== See also ==
- History of Paris
- Timeline of Paris

== Bibliography ==
- Bove, Boris; Gauvard, Claude (2014). Le Paris du Moyen Age (in French). Paris: Belin. ISBN 978-2-7011-8327-5.
- Byrne, Joseph P. (2012). Encyclopedia of the Black Death. ABC-CLIO. ISBN 978-1-59884-254-8. Archived from the original on 1 January 2016.
- Combeau, Yvan (2013). Histoire de Paris. Paris: Presses Universitaires de France. ISBN 978-2-13-060852-3.
- Fierro, Alfred (1996). Histoire et dictionnaire de Paris. Robert Laffont. ISBN 2-221--07862-4.
- Hillairet, Jacques (1978). Connaaissance du Vieux Paris. Paris: Editions Princesse. ISBN 2-85961-019-7.
- Héron de Villefosse, René (1959). Histoire de Paris. Bernard Grasset.
- Lawrence, Rachel; Gondrand, Fabienne (2010). Paris (City Guide) (12th ed.). London: Insight Guides. ISBN 978-981-282-079-2.
- Meunier, Florian (2014). Le Paris du moyen âge. Paris: Editions Ouest-France. ISBN 978-2-7373-6217-0.
- Piat, Christine (2004). France Médiéval. Monum Éditions de Patrimoine. ISBN 2-74-241394-4.
- Sarmant, Thierry (2012). Histoire de Paris: Politique, urbanisme, civilisation. Editions Jean-Paul Gisserot. ISBN 978-2-755-803303.
- Schmidt, Joel (2009). Lutece- Paris, des origines a Clovis. Perrin. ISBN 978-2-262-03015-5.
- Dictionnaire Historique de Paris. Le Livre de Poche. 2013. ISBN 978-2-253-13140-3.
