= Zouave (Pont de l'Alma) =

1856 statue in Paris

Coordinates: 48.86382°N 2.30202°E

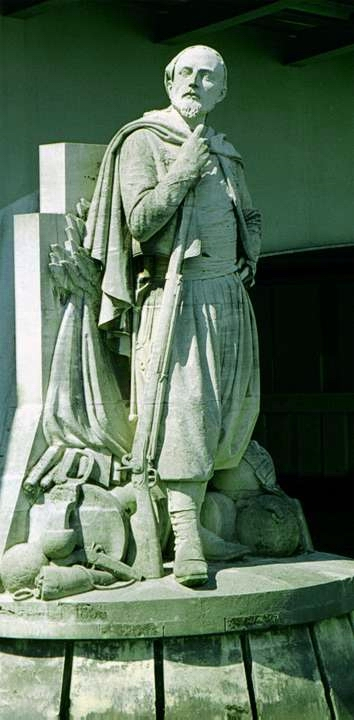
The Zouave statue in 2004

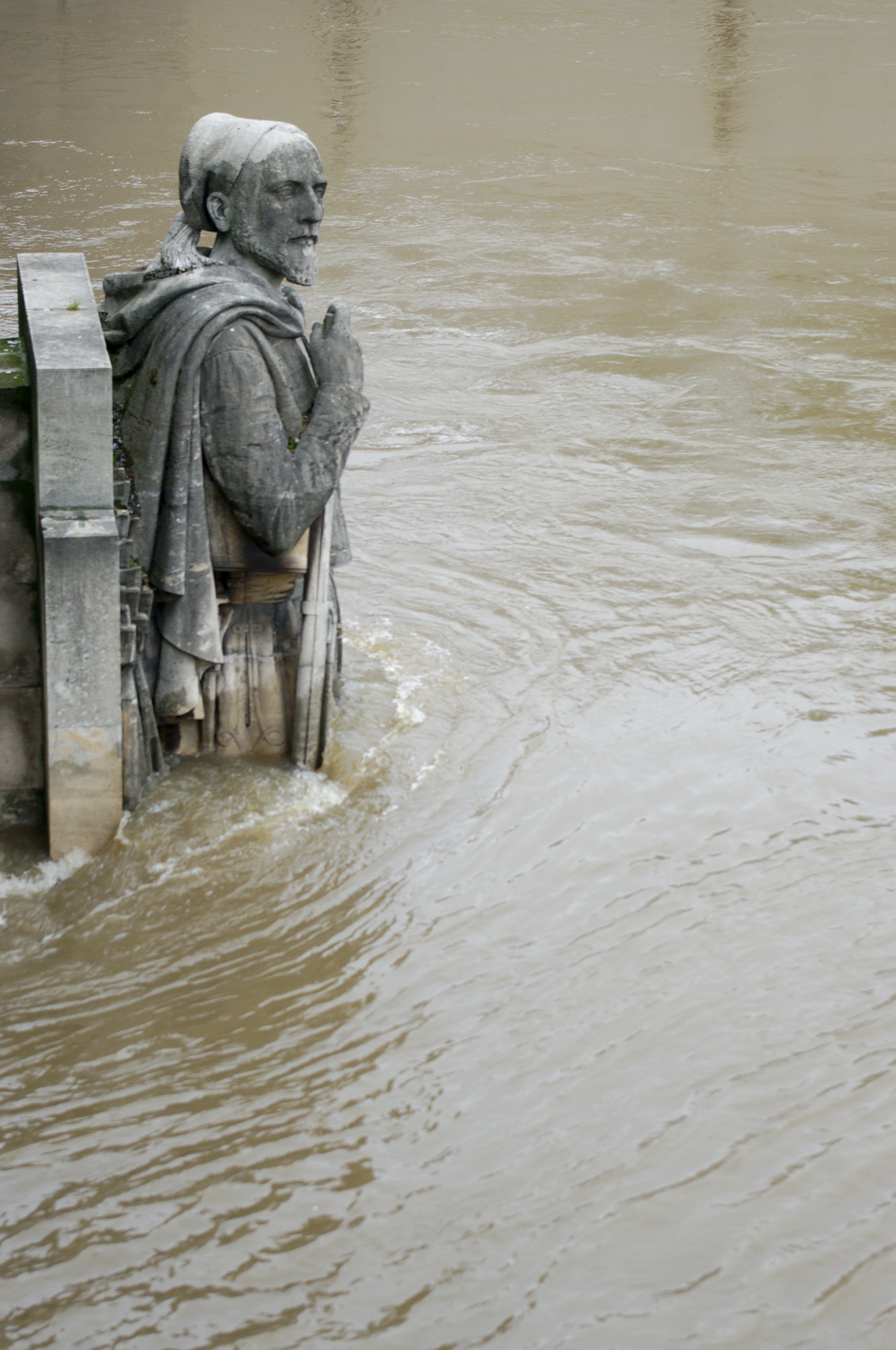
The Zouave statue, half-submerged by floodwaters on 3 June 2016

The Zouave is an 1856 stone statue by French artist Georges Diebolt, which has been sited on the Pont de l'Alma in Paris since the 1850s. The statue is used as an informal flood marker for the level of the River Seine in Paris.

== Background ==
An arch bridge over the Seine was first constructed at this location in Paris in the 1850s, connecting the Avenue George V (formerly the Avenue d'Alma) to the Quai d'Orsay and Quai Branly. The new bridge was named after the 1854 Battle of Alma in the Crimean War. The two supporting piers of the bridge in the river were decorated with military sculptures, one on each side of each pier. Each of the four sculptures depicts a French soldier from the Crimean War: a Zouave and a grenadier by Georges Diebolt, and a chasseur and an artilleryman by Auguste Arnaud.

Three of the four statues on the Pont de l'Alma were removed and relocated when the bridge was reconstructed as a wider girder bridge in the 1970s, but The Zouave was reinstalled on the new bridge, although in a somewhat lower position.

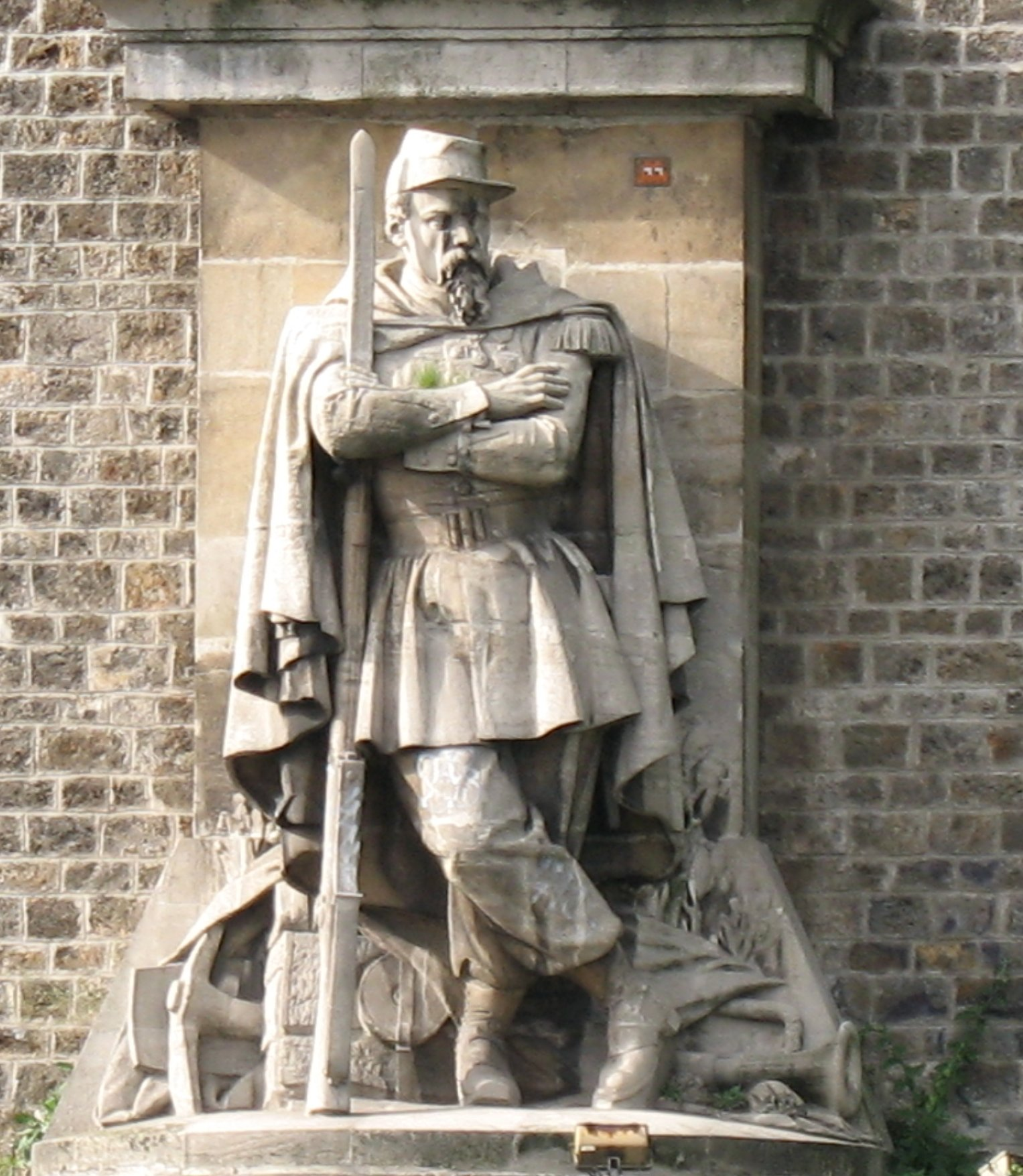
Chasseur à pied by Auguste Arnaud, now at the Redoute de Gravelle, in the Bois de Vincennes

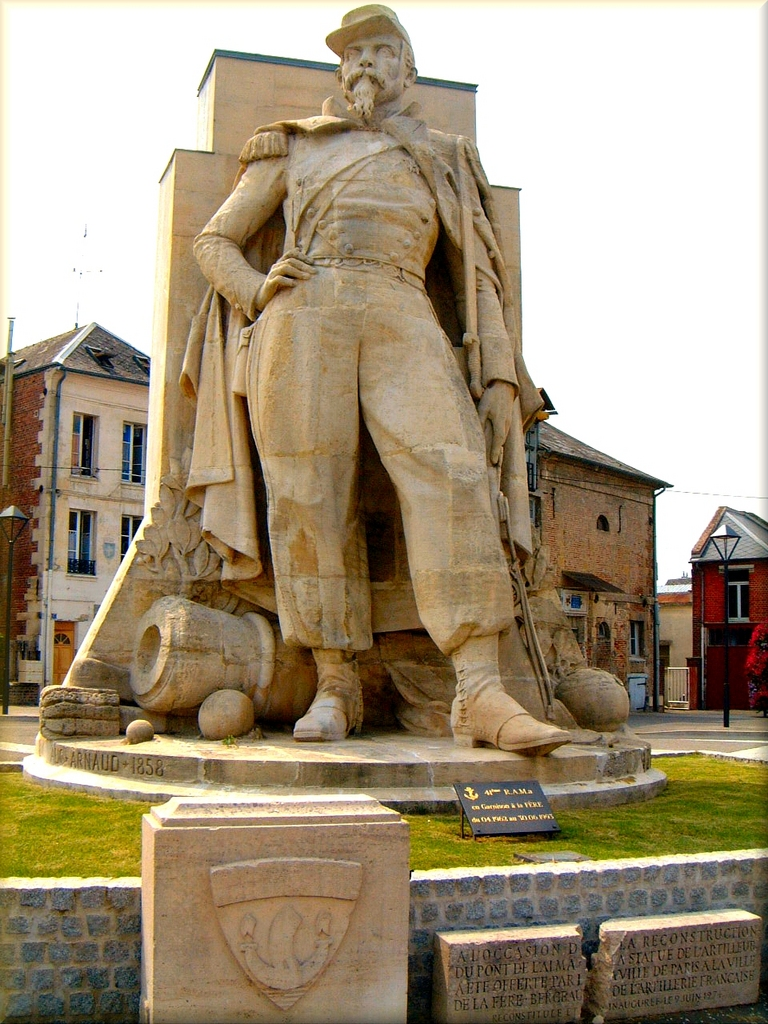
Artilleur by Auguste Arnaud, now in La Fère, Aisne

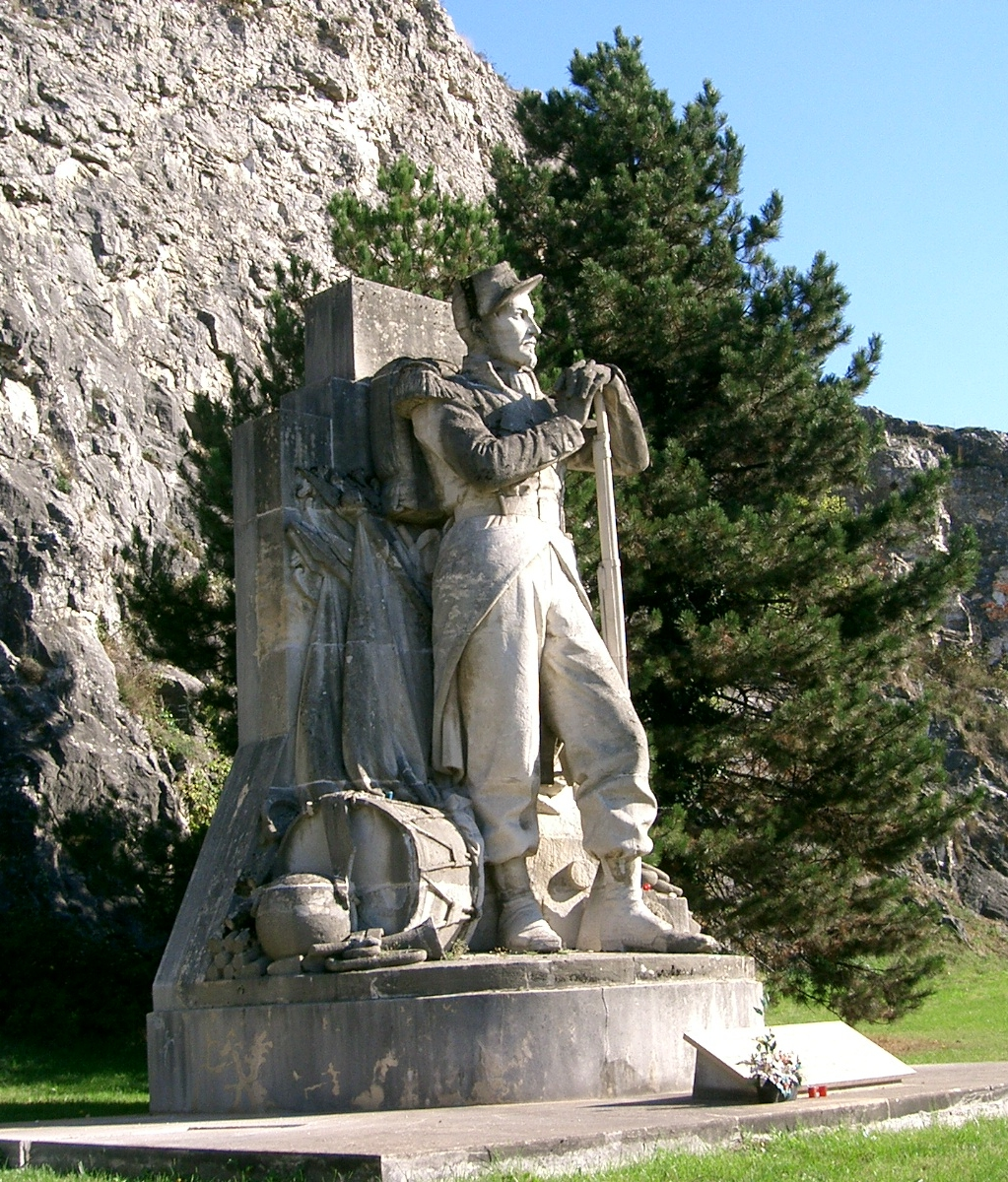
Grenadier by Georges Diebolt, in Dijon, birthplace of its sculptor

== Description ==
The French Zouave wears the traditional uniform based on the styles of clothing worn in North Africa in the early 1800s, with a short open-fronted jacket, sashes, and baggy trousers (sirwal) gathered above the ankle. The figure has removed its fez, and is resting on a grounded rifle. The statue is 5.2 metres (17 ft) high and weighs 8 tonnes. It is said to have been modelled on André-Louis Gody.

The Zouave statue is used as an informal flood marker in Paris: the footpaths along the embankments beside the Seine were usually closed when the level of the river reached the feet of The Zouave, and the river was unnavigable by the time it reached his thighs. At the time of the 1910 Great Flood of Paris, the floodwater reached his shoulders. The official point for measuring the level of the river is now at the Pont d'Austerlitz: before 1876 it was at Pont de la Tournelle.

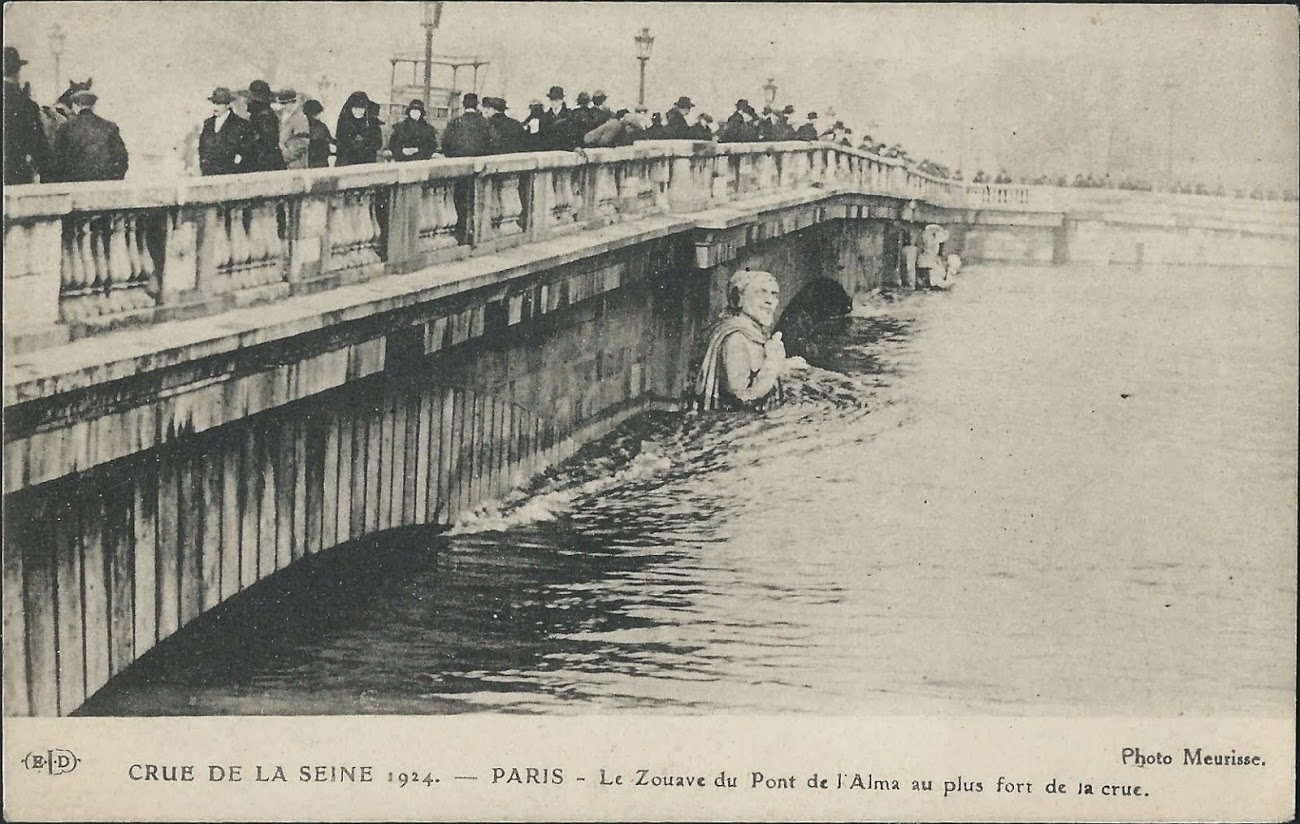
Zouave statue submerged above its waist by a flood at the old bridge in 1924

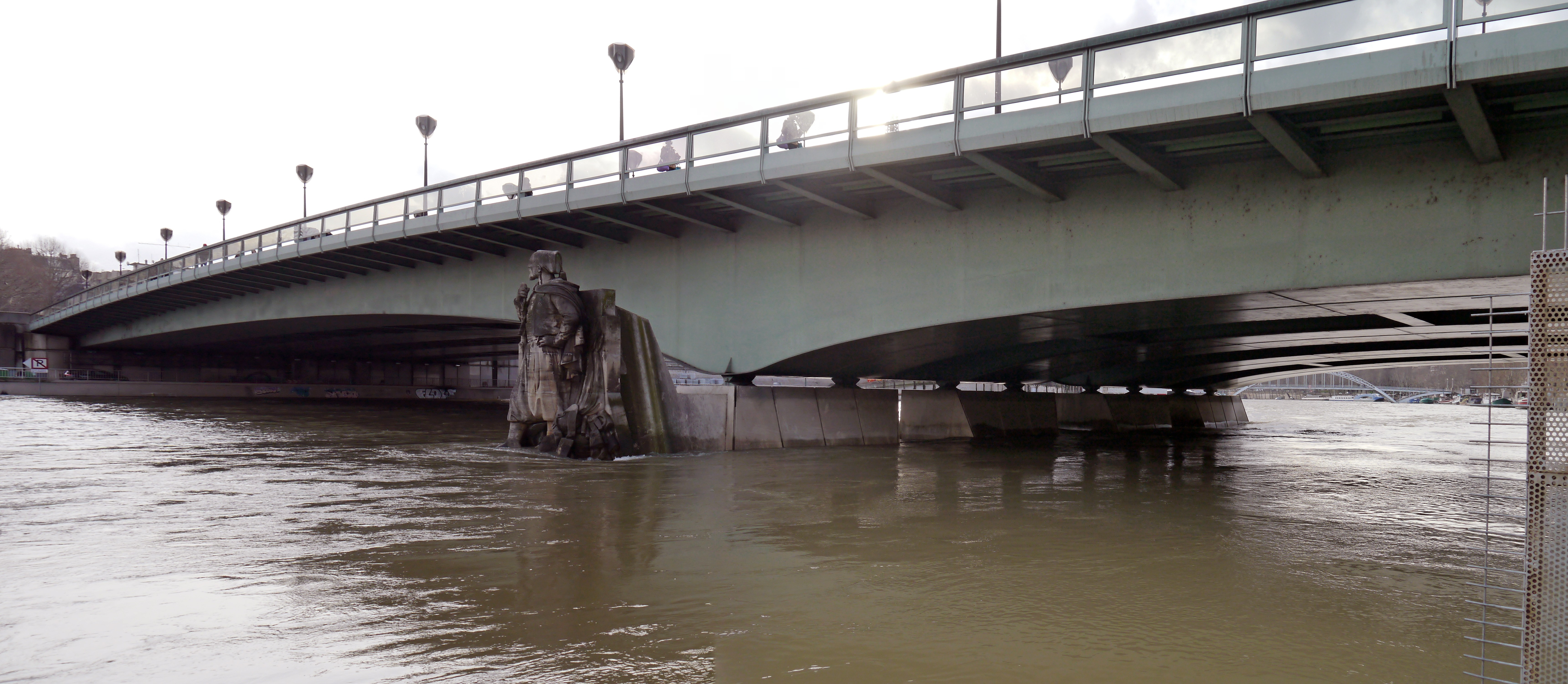
Zouave statue in a flood at the new bridge in 2013
