= Paul Gallocher de Lagalisserie =

French civil engineer (1805–1871)

Paul Gallocher de Lagalisserie (full name Paul Martin Philémon Gallocher de Lagalisserie; (Note: He signed "P. de Lagallisserie", and "Paul" is underlined, as the name he was known by, on his annual staff reports of 1857–1864.) 29 May 1805, Place Dauphine, Paris – 5 August 1871, Balbins, Isère) was a French engineer of the Corps des ponts et chaussées. He built a number of bridges in Paris and around the Île-de-France. He was the son of Martin Pierre Gallocher de Lagalisserie, an official at the Ministry of the Interior, and Marie Delphine Théodore Mesnager.

== Career ==
He studied at the École polytechnique (1825) and the École des ponts et chaussées (1827), and spent almost his whole career in and around Paris. From 1841 to 1858 he worked on the bridges of Paris and the navigation of the Seine, as chief engineer from 1845: he restored the Pont Neuf and rebuilt or built the Notre-Dame, Austerlitz, Invalides, Alma and Saint-Michel bridges. From 1859 he was in charge of the roads of the suburbs annexed to Paris in 1860. He became inspector general in 1864 and a member of the Conseil général des ponts et chaussées in 1870, was sent to the Isère to help organise national defence in September 1870, retired on 1 August 1871 and died four days later. He was made an officer of the Legion of Honour in 1854.

== Notable projects ==
- Pont Neuf (restoration, completed 1853)
- Pont Notre-Dame (1853)
- Pont d'Austerlitz (1855)
- Pont des Invalides (1856)
- Pont de l'Alma (1856)
- Pont Saint-Michel (1857), with Paul Vaudrey

Designed by him and completed after he left the Paris bridges service at the end of 1858:

- Pont au Change (1860)
- Pont de Solférino (1861)
