= Georges Diebolt =

French sculptor

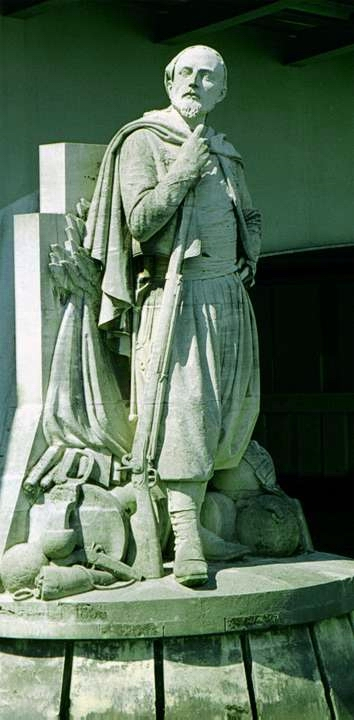
Diebolt's The Zouave, still on the pont de l'Alma

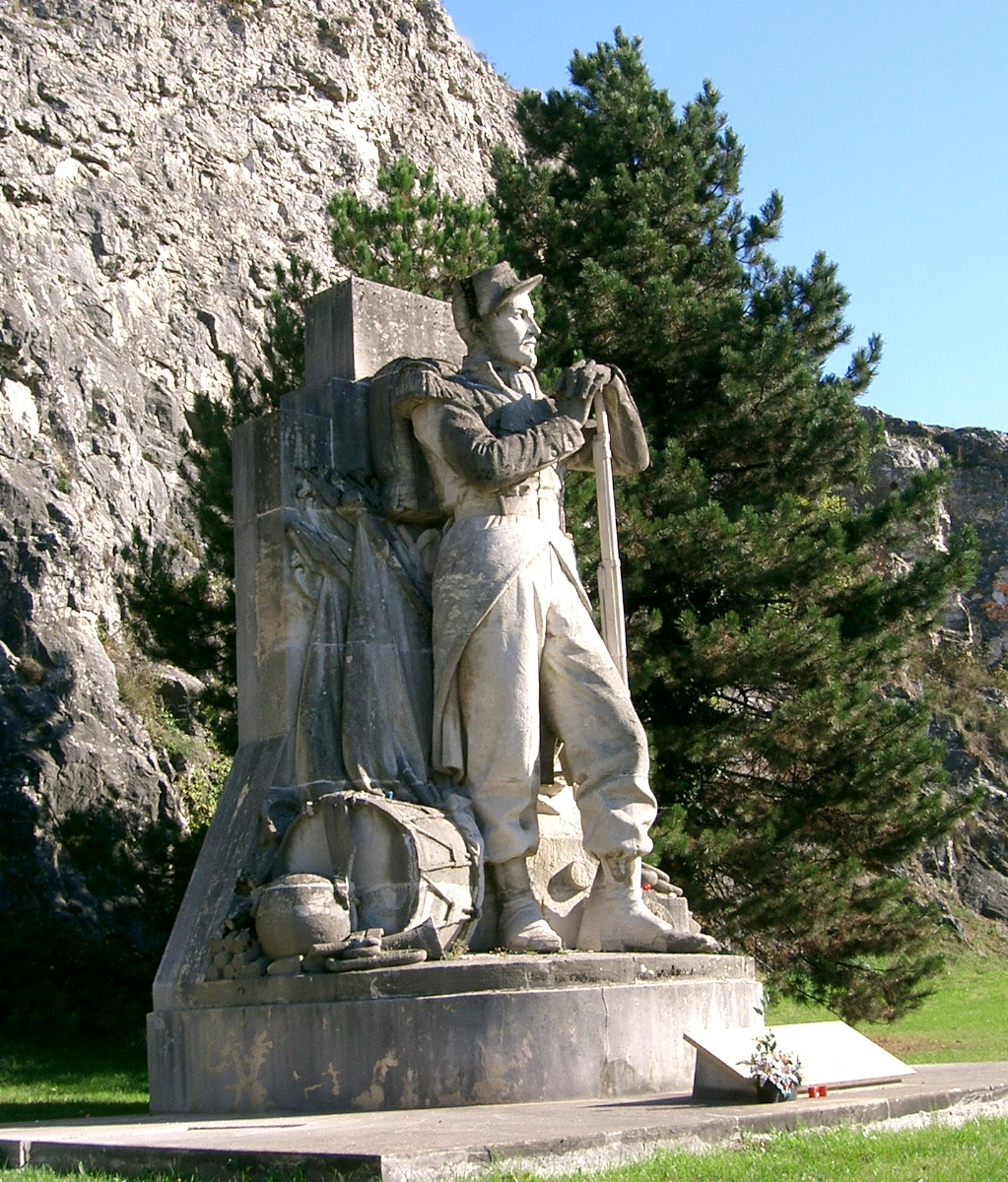
Diebolt's The Grenadier, since 1970 on the shores of Lake Kir in Diebolt's birthplace of Dijon, facing the road to Paris

Georges Diebolt, sometimes spelled Diébolt, (6 May 1816, Dijon – 7 November 1861, Paris) was a French sculptor best known for his publicly commissioned monumental works, including The Zouave and Grenadier on the pont de l'Alma in Paris and the Maritime Victory on the Pont des Invalides.

== Life ==
Trained at the École nationale supérieure des Beaux-Arts in Paris, he then went to the Villa Medici after winning the Prix de Rome in 1841, towards the end of the reign of King Louis-Philippe. He came to be valued for works in an academic style which prefigured his 1841 plaster bas-relief La mort de Démosthène (now at the École nationale supérieure des Beaux-Arts), or La Villanelle, exhibited at the Salon of 1848 and remarked upon by Théophile Gautier, who described it as

A charming head and if there is a single object which a critic, forced to at least glance at 5000 objets d'art, may remain contemplating for whole hours, above all else it is the Villanelle by M. Diébolt. It is impossible to see a finer, purer, more regular profile, a more candid or more soft serenity. The hairstyle is adjusted with a perfect grace and wonderfully frames the forehead.

— Théophile Gautier, Théophile Gautier SALON DE 1848 http://www.theophilegautier.fr/wp-content/uploads/2010/06/Salon-1848.pdf

He also produced some more or less romantic paintings, such as Hero and Leander (exhibited in the "grande galerie XIXe siècle" of the Musée Roger-Quilliot at Clermont-Ferrand).

His short career as a sculptor profited largely from public commissions under the Second French Empire—he was much sought after for monumental works and received the Legion of Honour, before dying at only 45.

== Works ==
Diebolt treated with equal eclecticism religious subjects such as Saint John the Evangelist (placed on the first story of the tower of Saint-Jacques in Paris during its 1852 restoration) and modern themes, such as the 1854 Maritime Victory on the pont d'Austerlitz.

He also produced pieces for public fountains, such as that at Nîmes with James Pradier or some of the statues decorating the new Louvre building inaugurated by Napoleon III in 1857. Also his are some of the works dominating the Palais des Arts et de l'Industrie, built for the Exposition universelle of 1855, which were re-erected in the Parc de Saint-Cloud when this building was demolished.

He gained his fame above all, however, by his participation in the decoration of the pont de l'Alma in Paris, for which he sculpted The Zouave and The Grenadier, commissioned to pay homage to the French army's part in the Crimean War and inaugurated on 15 August 1858. Two other soldiers, the Artilleur and Chasseur à pied, were contributed by Auguste Arnaud. These monumental works (6 metres high and weighing several tonnes) were removed when the bridge was refaced in 1963. The Zouave, to which Parisians had become attached, was re-attached to the bridge near the right bank of the Seine and continues to serve as a flood-level indicator.

== Contemporaries ==
Georges Diebolt was the contemporary of better known artists such as James Pradier (1792–1852, a friend of Victor Hugo), Antoine-Louis Barye (1796–1875, the sculptor of animals), or Jean-Baptiste Carpeaux (1827–1875, whose celebrated group The Dance dates to 1869). He also knew Frédéric Auguste Bartholdi (1834–1904), creator of (among other works) the Statue of Liberty in New York and the Lion de Belfort, and Emmanuel Frémiet (1824–1910), who sculpted the Joan of Arc in place des Pyramides and the Saint Michael on the top of the spire at Mont-Saint-Michel.

Among Diebolt's students was the sculptor Louis-Léon Cugnot.
