= Pont de l'Alma =

Road bridge in Paris, France

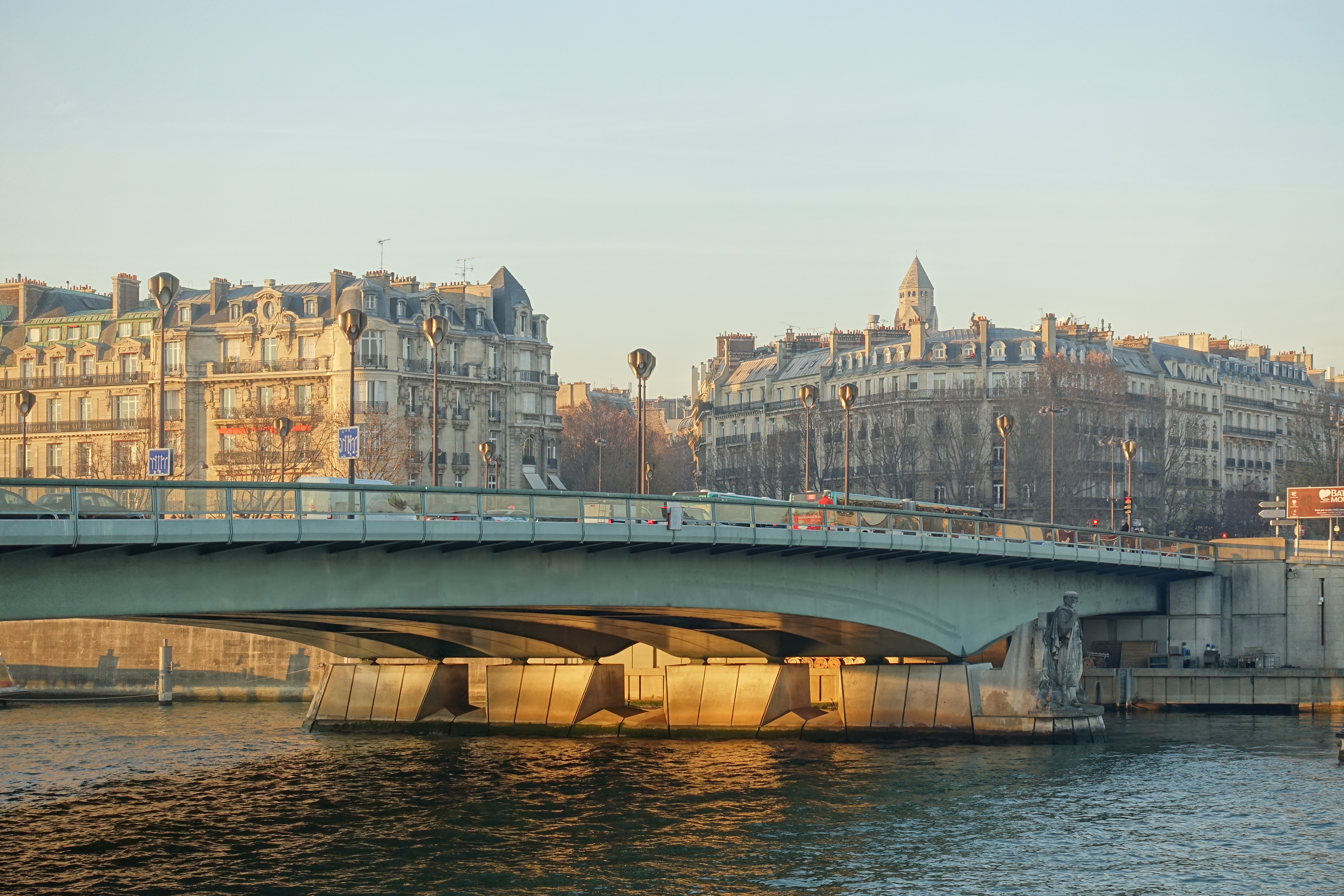
- The Pont de l'Alma in Paris
- Coordinates: 48.8635°N 2.3018°E
- Crosses: Seine
- Locale: Paris, France
- Official name: Pont de l'Alma
- Next upstream: Pont des Invalides
- Next downstream: Passerelle Debilly

Characteristics
- Design: Girder bridge
- Total length: 153 m (502 ft)
- Width: 42 m (138 ft)

Location
- Interactive map of Pont de l'Alma

The Pont de l'Alma (French pronunciation: [pɔ̃ d(ə) lalma]; English: Alma Bridge) is a road bridge in Paris, France, across the Seine. It was named to commemorate the Battle of Alma during the Crimean War, in which the Ottoman-Franco-British alliance achieved victory over the Russian army in 1854. The bridge is known for being the site of the car crash that caused the death of Diana, Princess of Wales, in 1997.

== History ==
=== Construction ===
Construction of an arch bridge took place between 1854 and 1856. It was designed by Paul Gallocher de Lagalisserie and was inaugurated by Napoleon III on 2 April 1856. Each side of both of the two piers was decorated with a statue of military nature: a Zouave and a grenadier by Georges Diébolt, and a skirmisher and an artilleryman by Arnaud.

=== The Zouave statue and flooding ===
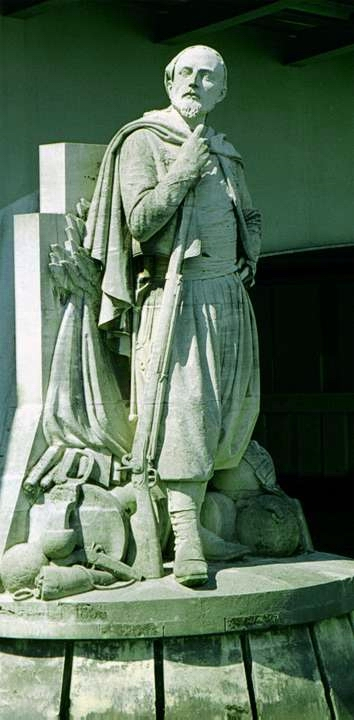
The Zouave statue

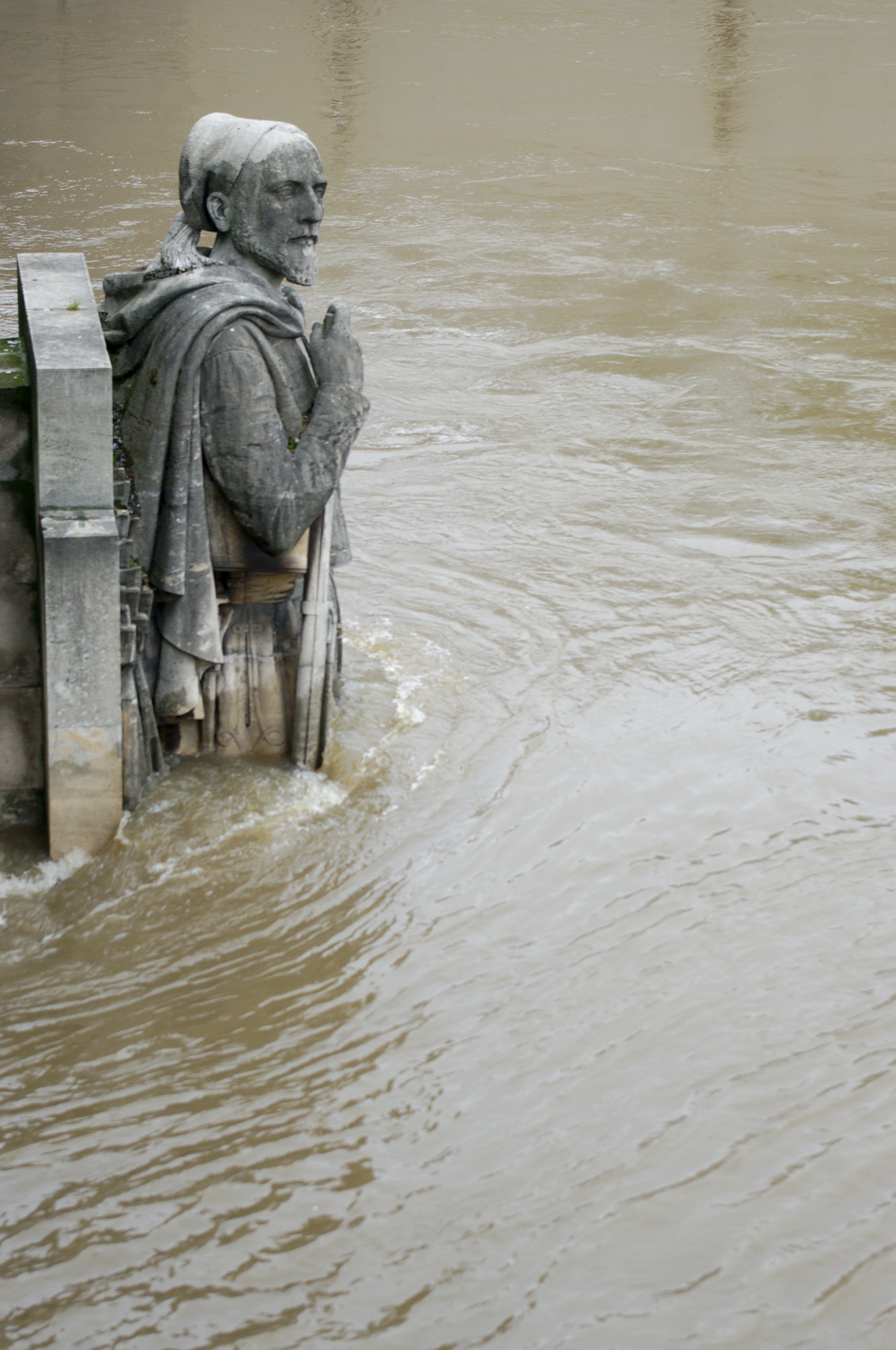
The Zouave, partially submerged by floodwaters on 3 June 2016

The general public took the original bridge as a measuring instrument for water levels in times of flooding on the Seine: access to the footpaths by the river embankments usually were closed when the Seine's level reached the feet of The Zouave; when the water hit his thighs, the river was unnavigable. During the great flood of the Seine in 1910, the level reached his shoulders. The French Civil Service used the Pont de la Tournelle, not the Pont de l'Alma, to gauge flood levels, and since 1868 uses the Pont d'Austerlitz.

=== Reconstruction ===
The bridge underwent complete reconstruction as a girder bridge between 1970 and 1974, as it had been too narrow to accommodate the increasing traffic both on and below it; moreover, the structure had subsided some 80 centimeters. Only the statue of the Zouave was retained: the Skirmisher was relocated to the Gravelle Stronghold in Vincennes, the Grenadier to Dijon, and the Artilleryman to La Fère.

=== Death of Diana, Princess of Wales ===
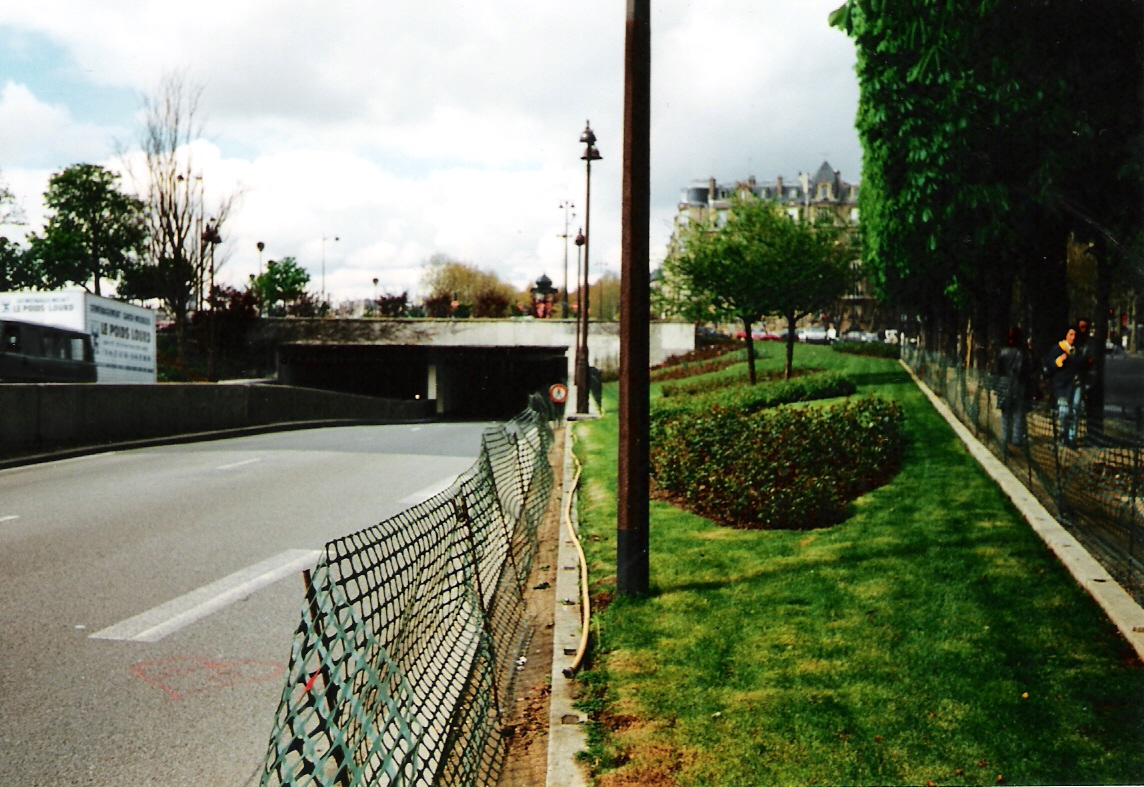
Entrance to the Pont de l'Alma tunnel in April 1998, the site where Diana's car clipped a white Fiat, collided with a road pillar and then hit the wall

The bridge is close to the Pont de l'Alma tunnel where Diana, Princess of Wales, and three others were involved in a fatal car crash on 31 August 1997. They were being chased by paparazzi, and their chauffeur, named Henri Paul, was driving under the influence of alcohol when their car lost control and slammed head-on into a pillar. Dodi Fayed and Paul were pronounced dead at the scene on removal from the wreckage. Diana was critically injured in the crash and died afterwards from her injuries in the hospital. Their bodyguard, named Trevor Rees-Jones, was the only one to survive, sustaining a serious head injury. The Flame of Liberty (completed in 1987), at the bridge's north end has become an unofficial memorial to Diana. The square is now officially named Place Diana. The tunnel is known as an accident black spot, as there were eight deaths in the area.

== Technical specifications ==
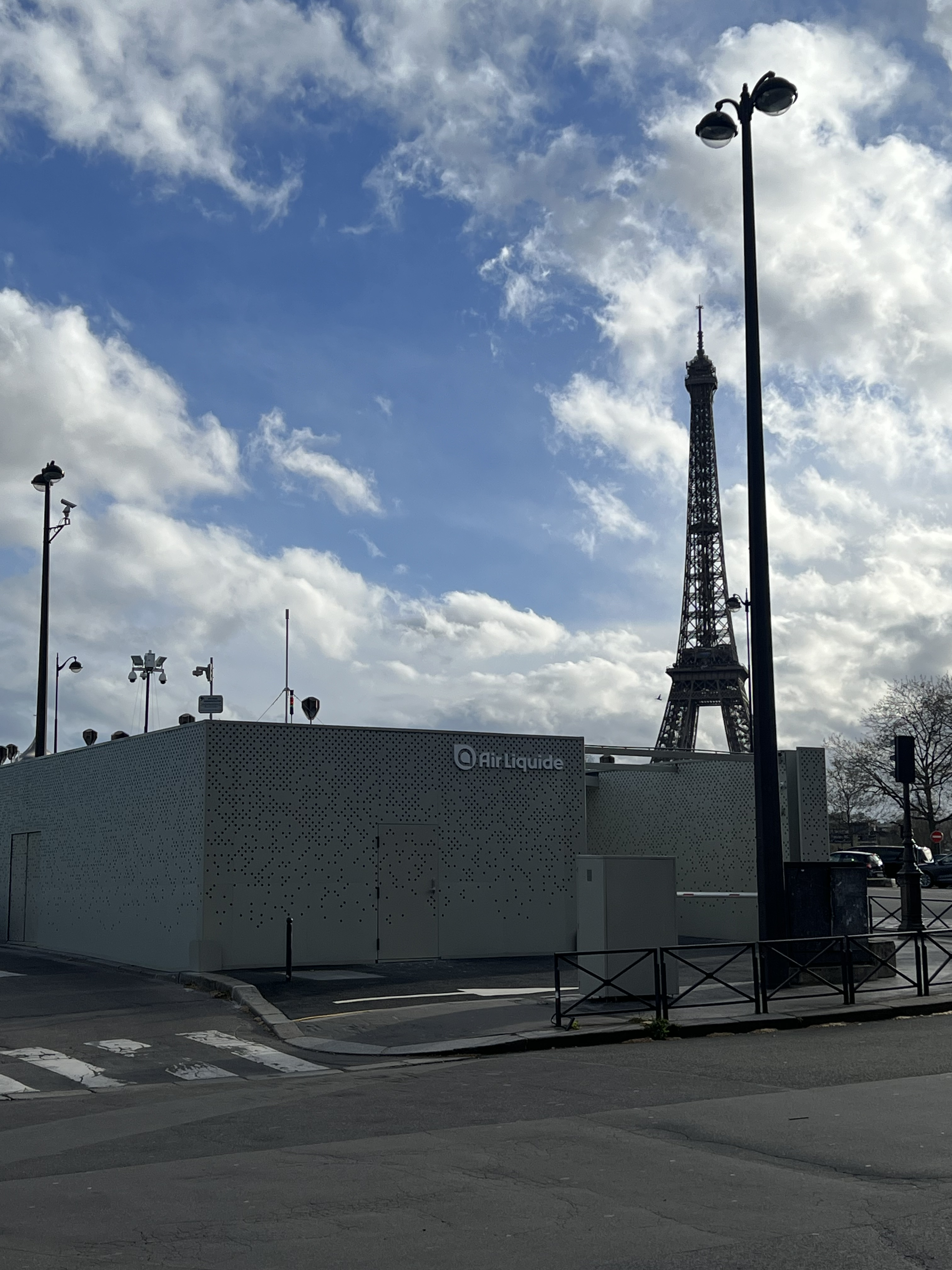
Air Liquide hydrogen station at the Pont de l'Alma

Pont de l'Alma has a length of 153 meters (502 ft) and a width of 42 meters (138 ft).

== Access ==
The Metro station Alma–Marceau is near the north end of the bridge, RER station Pont de l'Alma near the south end.
