= Balbins =

Commune in Isère, France

- Part of Ornacieux-Balbins
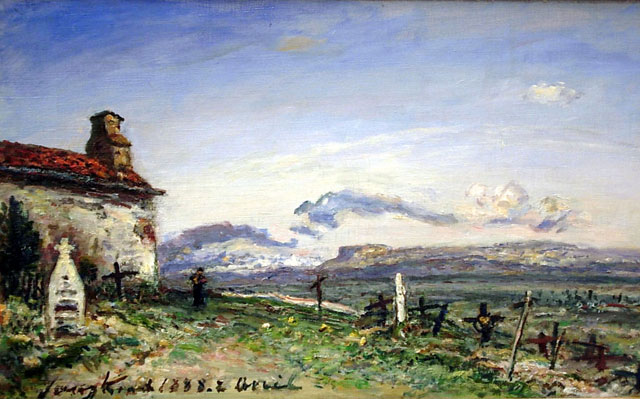
- The Balbins Cemetery oil painting in 1888 by Johan Barthold Jongkind
- Location of Balbins
- Location within France Location within Auvergne-Rhône-Alpes
- Coordinates: 45°23′40″N 5°13′00″E
- Country: France
- Region: Auvergne-Rhône-Alpes
- Department: Isère
- Arrondissement: Vienne
- Canton: Bièvre
- Commune: Ornacieux-Balbins
- Area^{1}: 7.26 km^{2} (2.80 sq mi)
- Elevation: 150 m (490 ft)
- Highest elevation: 530 m (1,740 ft)
- Lowest elevation: 347 m (1,138 ft)
- Population (2022): 458
  - Density: 63.1/km^{2} (163/sq mi)
- Time zone: UTC+01:00 (CET)
  - Summer (DST): UTC+02:00 (CEST)
- Postal code: 38260
- ^{1} French Land Register data, which excludes lakes, ponds, glaciers > 1 km^{2} (0.386 sq mi or 247 acres) and river estuaries.

Balbins (French pronunciation: [balbɛ̃]) is a former commune in the Isère department in the Auvergne-Rhône-Alpes region of south-eastern France. On 1 January 2019, it was merged into the new commune Ornacieux-Balbins.

== Geography ==
Balbins is located some 40 km north-west of Grenoble just west of La Côte-Saint-André. Access to the commune is by the D73 from La Côte-Saint-André which passes through the commune just south of the village and continues west to Penol. The D518A passes through the east of the commune linking the D71 south of La Côte-Saint-André to the D518 north-west of La Côte-Saint-André. The commune is almost entirely farmland with urban area of the village merging with that of Ornacieux.

== Administration ==
List of Successive Mayors

From	To	Name
2008	2019	Anne Marie Amice

== Demography ==
The inhabitants of the commune are known as Balbinois or Balbinoises in French.

Historical population

Year	Pop.	±% p.a.
1793	248	—
1800	250	+0.11%
1806	342	+5.36%
1821	346	+0.08%
1831	386	+1.10%
1836	396	+0.51%
1841	410	+0.70%
1846	415	+0.24%
1851	389	−1.29%
1856	429	+1.98%
1861	403	−1.24%
1866	387	−0.81%
1872	394	+0.30%
1876	392	−0.13%
1881	405	+0.65%
1886	369	−1.84%
1891	335	−1.91%
1896	326	−0.54%

Year	Pop.	±% p.a.
1901	341	+0.90%
1906	327	−0.83%
1911	316	−0.68%
1921	278	−1.27%
1926	272	−0.44%
1931	308	+2.52%
1936	306	−0.13%
1946	285	−0.71%
1954	256	−1.33%
1962	233	−1.17%
1968	205	−2.11%
1975	257	+3.28%
1982	313	+2.86%
1990	363	+1.87%
1999	371	+0.24%
2007	394	+0.75%
2012	394	+0.00%
2022	458	+1.52%

Source: EHESS and INSEE

== Sites and monuments ==
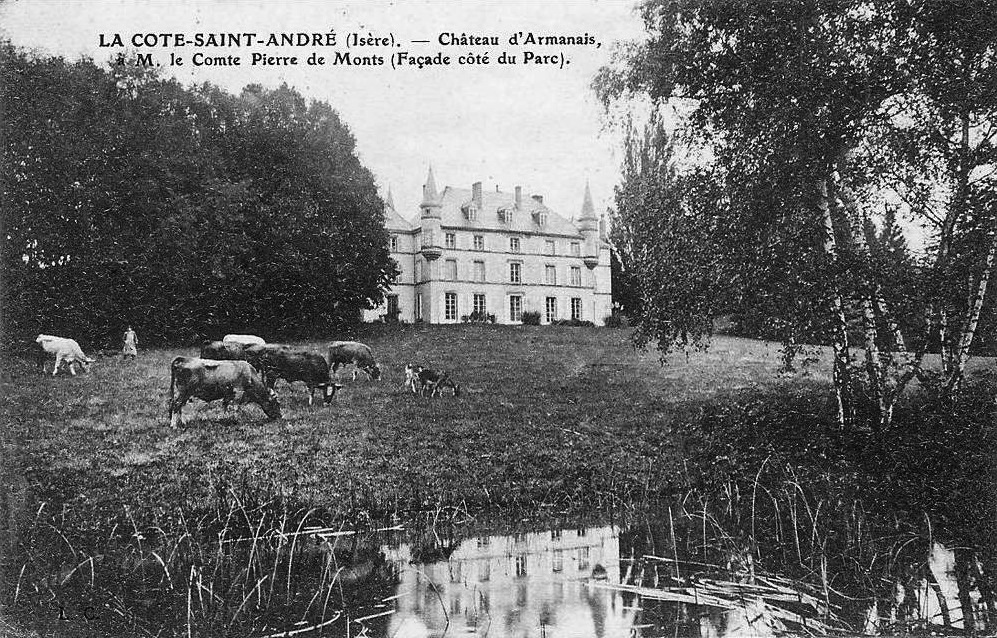
The Chateau of Armanet in 1913

- The Buissonnière Tower is the last vestige of the fortified house that stood there; it was the possession of Miribel, Salignon, and Côte Saint-André.
- The Chateau of Armanet was a former Templar fortified house

== Notable people linked to the commune ==
- Félicien de Mons de Savasse, born in the Chateau of Armanet, Knight and Commander of the Order of Malta in 1760.

== See also ==
- Communes of the Isère department
