= Pont des Invalides =

Bridge in Paris, France

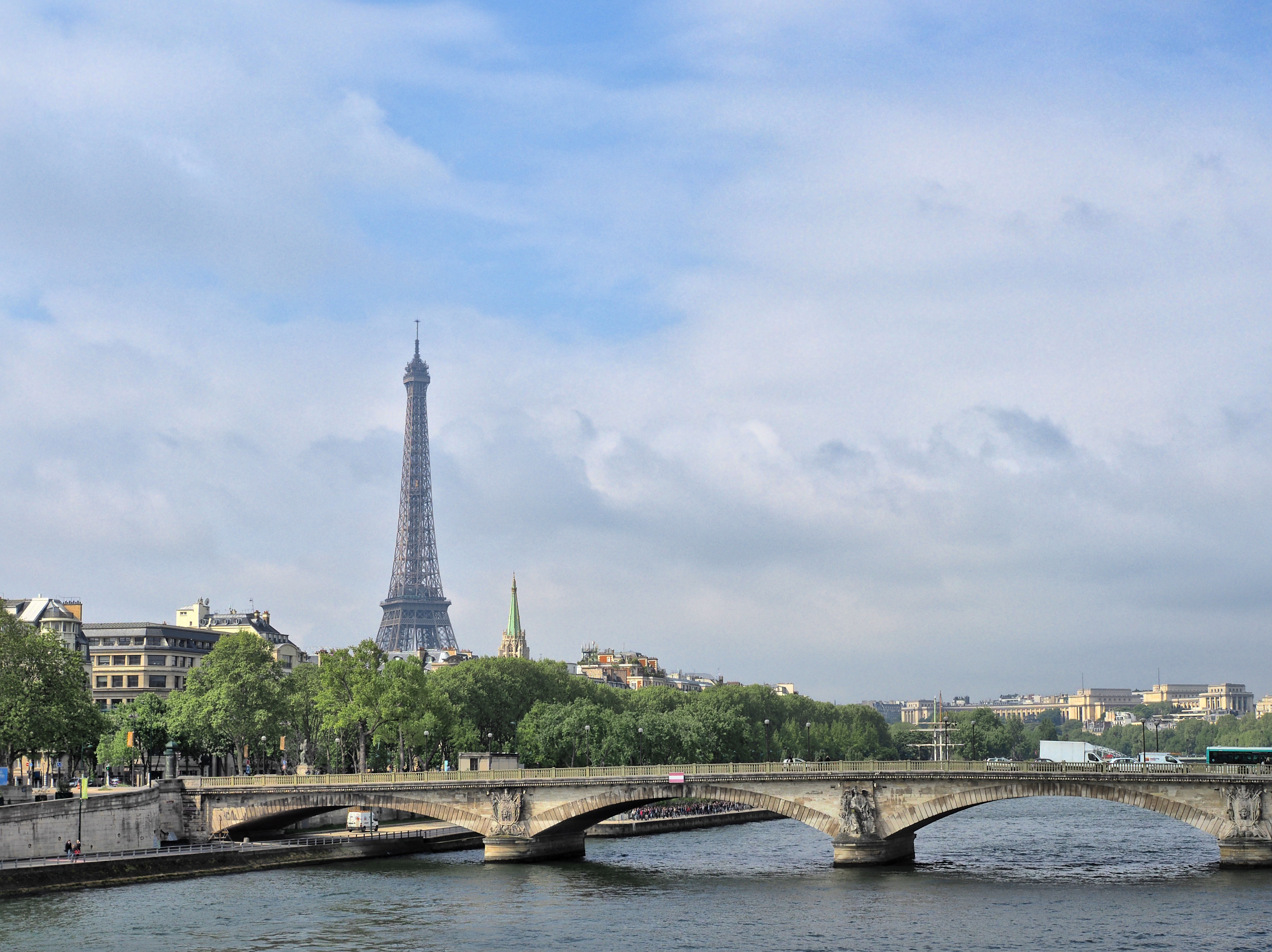
- Pont des Invalides
- Coordinates: 48°51′49″N 02°18′37″E
- Crosses: Seine
- Locale: Paris, France
- Official name: Pont des Invalides
- Maintained by: Civil Service
- Next upstream: Pont Alexandre III
- Next downstream: Pont de l'Alma

Characteristics
- Design: Arch bridge
- Total length: 152 m (499 ft)
- Width: 18 m (59 ft)

History
- Opened: 1855 (current structure)

Location
- Interactive map of Pont des Invalides

The Pont des Invalides (French pronunciation: [pɔ̃ dez‿ɛ̃valid]) is the lowest bridge traversing the Seine in Paris.

== History ==
The story of this bridge started in 1821, when engineer Claude Navier conceived a technologically revolutionary bridge that crossed the Seine in one single reach without any point of support in between. The proposed suspension bridge, the construction of which started in 1824, was meant to be erected opposite to the Hotel des Invalides on the site of the current Pont Alexandre III. Navier failed to leave a safety margin on top of his calculations, and the contract to build the bridge was unusually rigid. After Navier's plan had been approved by the private investment company, the contractor could not make changes without approval, and there was no authorization to suggest improvements. The bridge became unsafe after cracking of the anchorages due to natural settling and additional movement after a water main break near the buttresses. The bridge had to be dismantled, and Navier was chastised by a government committee for relying too much on mathematics. He was even compared unfavorably to the accomplishments of (French rival) British bridge builders. After a settlement between the contractor and investors was reached, the raw materials were reused for other bridges, with designs to be provided by the head investor Alain Desjardins, which were widely seen as less elegant.

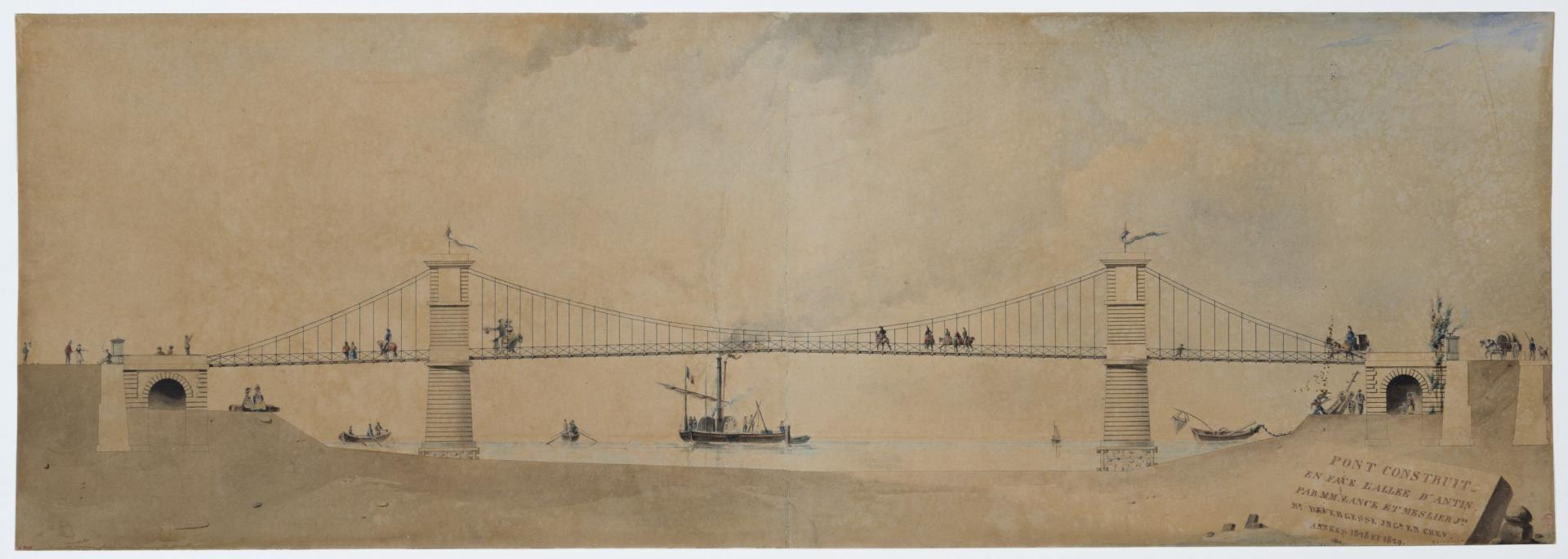
The 1829 bridge

In response to complaints from the defenders of the Invalides perspective, the Public Services decided to shift the bridge site downriver. Therefore, in 1829, two engineers, de Verges and Bayard de la Vingtrie, completed the construction of a proper suspension bridge supported by two piers in the Seine and three porticos, each 20 m in height. Unfortunately, due to rapidly growing wear on the bridge, its access had to be regulated in 1850.

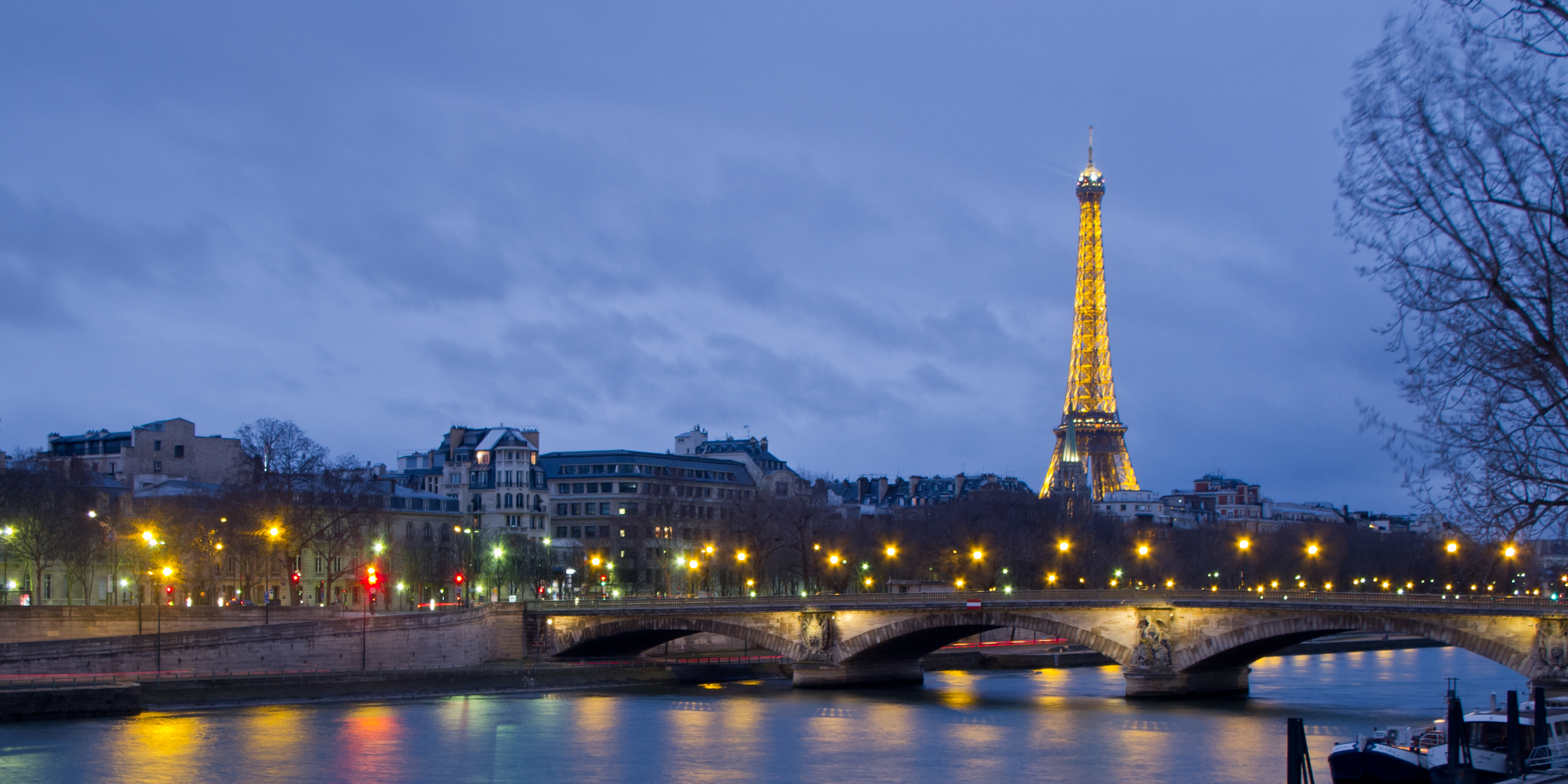
The bridge illuminated at night

In 1854, the bridge was demolished to be replaced by a new one in time for the upcoming Exposition Universelle (1855) in Paris. Paul Gallocher de Lagalisserie and Jules Savarin used the existing piers of the former suspension bridge and a newly added central pier to build an arch bridge in masonry on the same site. The new pier was adorned with sculptures in two allegorical themes: the Land Victory by Victor Vilain upriver; the Maritime Victory by Georges Diébolt downstream, whereas the two old piers were adorned with sculptures of military trophies bearing the imperial coat of arms, both the work of Astyanax-Scévola Bosio.

Despite being stronger, the new bridge still sustained a subsidence between 25 and 30 cm in 1878, and lost two arches during the winter of 1880 (restored by the end of the year). The bridge has been quite secure since then and the only modification made in the 20th century was the expansion of its pavement in 1956.

After the 2024 Summer Olympics, one of the two lanes for general traffic has been converted into a second bus lane.

== Access ==
Location on the Seine

Located near the Metro station: Champs-Élysées - Clemenceau.

Located near the Metro station: La Tour-Maubourg.

Located near the Metro station: Alma - Marceau.
