= Petit Pont =

Petit-Pont
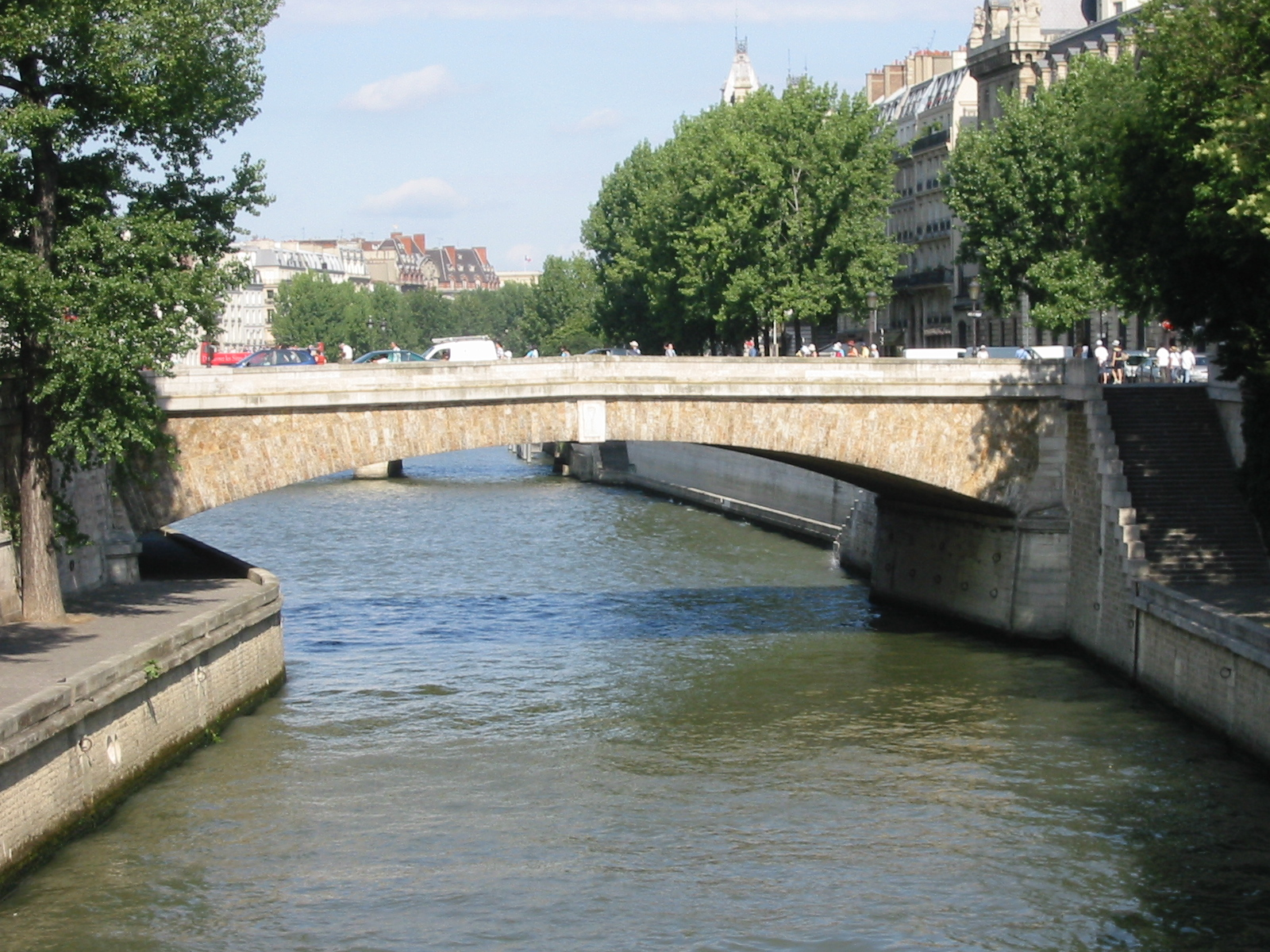
- Petit-Pont seen from pont au Double
- Coordinates: 48°51′12″N 02°20′49″E
- Crosses: River Seine
- Locale: Paris, France
- Next upstream: Pont au Double
- Next downstream: Pont Saint-Michel

Characteristics
- Design: Michal (architect); Gariel (constructor)
- Total length: 32 metres (105 ft)
- Width: 20 metres (66 ft)

History
- Construction start: 1853
- Construction end: 1853
- Opened: 1853

Location
- Interactive map of Petit-Pont

The Petit Pont (French pronunciation: [pəti pɔ̃], Little Bridge; since 2013 Petit-Pont-Cardinal-Lustiger) is an arch bridge crossing the River Seine in Paris, built in 1853, although a structure has crossed the river at this point since antiquity. The present bridge is a single stone arch linking the 4th arrondissement and the Île de la Cité, with the 5th arrondissement, between quai de Montebello and quai Saint-Michel. The Petit Pont is notable for having been destroyed at least thirteen times since its original inception during Gallo-Roman times to the mid-19th century.

== History ==
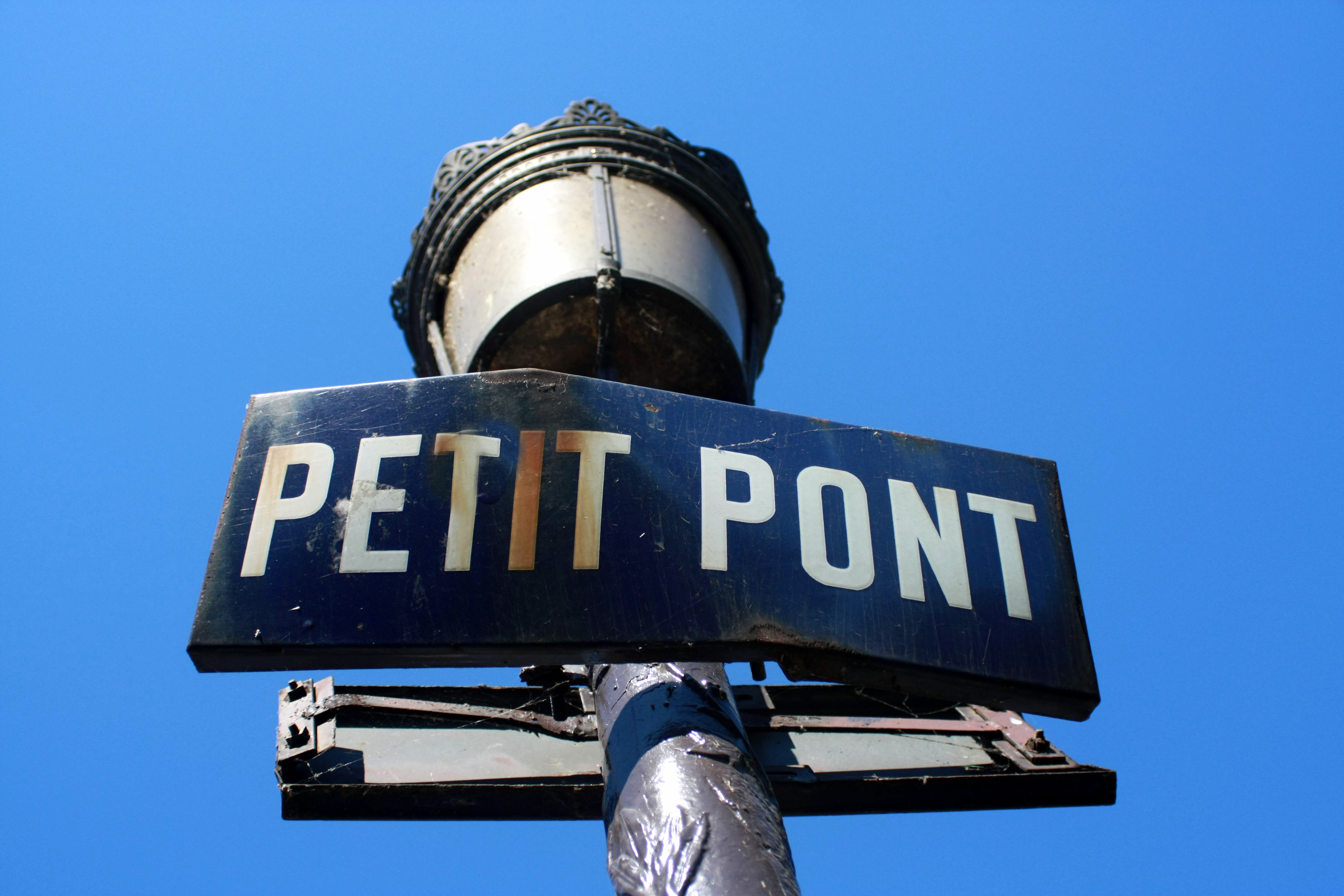
Petit Pont sign

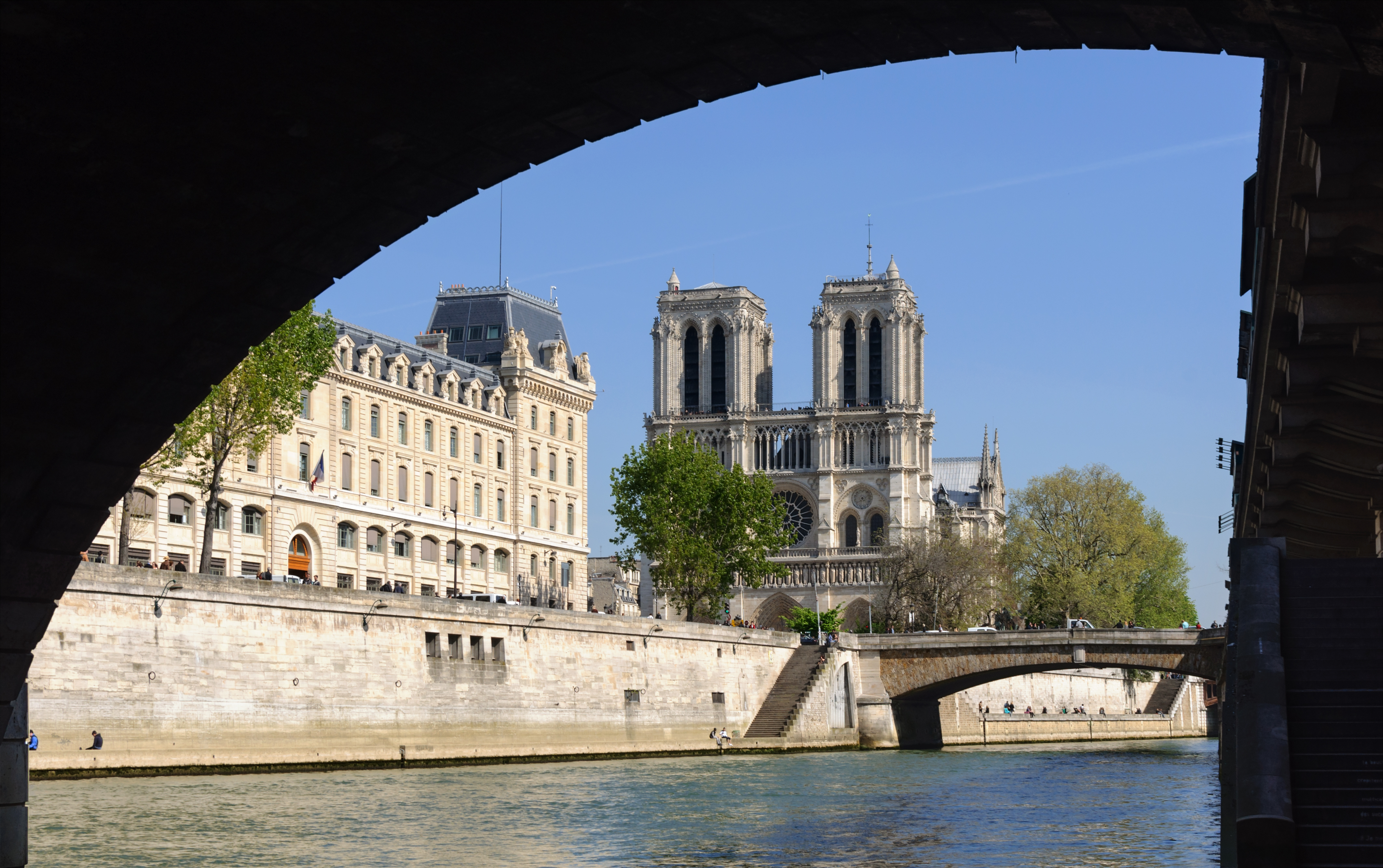
Notre-Dame de Paris and the Petit-Pont as seen from under the Pont Saint-Michel

A bridge linking the Île de la Cité with the southern bank of the Seine has existed on this spot since early history. In the Roman predecessor to Paris, Lutetia Parisiorum, a bridge was built to utilize the convenient ford of the Seine, today's Île de la Cité. Often a victim of floods, the structure has been repeatedly rebuilt. The first known flood destroying this bridge was in 885 AD. The bridge subsequently was carried away by successive floods at least thirteen times between 885 and 1658, and at least eleven times before it was built in stone. In 1175, following yet another flood, the bishop of Paris Maurice de Sully gave his support for a new reconstruction, this time in stone. Further, after a flood destroyed the structure again in 1393, the construction of another stone bridge on the site was funded by a tax of 9,500 livres on the Jews living in Paris.

The bridge rebuilt under the reign of Charles VI consisted of three arches and lasted from 1398 until 1408, when it was swept away by the river and had to be re-established beginning in 1409. However, funds were difficult to attain, and the bridge was not finished until 1416. Upon completion, houses were constructed atop the bridge, many erected later by the Italian architect Fra (friar) Giovanni Giocondo, who also worked on the Pont Notre-Dame, while in the service of the king of France between 1496 and 1499. Again, the overflowing river caused the bridge to collapse in 1649, 1651, 1658, and 1659. The 1659 reincarnation contained an inscription detailing the high cost the bridge's frequent destructions had caused the city.

In 1718, two boats loaded with hay attempted to pass beneath the Petit Pont. At that time, the structure was a solid stone structure, but the stone arches rested on large wooden piles. On an April night, a woman who had lost her child to drowning in the Seine that morning went out in a boat in search of the body. To light the area, she used a wooden taper, burning at one end. Her boat collided with a barge laden with hay, the hay caught on fire, and the boat floated into the Petit Pont, burning it down. It was replaced by another in 1719, with no houses on it.

Designed by the architect Alexandre Michal, and built by Ernest Gariel, the present Petit Pont was begun in 1852 to provide more adequate clearance between the water and the bridge. Thus, the three arches were reduced to one. This new bridge was opened to traffic in 1853.

== Location ==
Location on the Seine

The Petit Pont is centrally located in Paris' 4th and 5th arrondissements, connecting the Île de la Cité, one of the two natural islands on the Seine within the city limits, to the Rive Gauche (French: Left Bank.) It is near the Saint-Michel station on the Paris Metro.
