= Ornacieux-Balbins =

- Commune
- Location of Ornacieux-Balbins
- Location within France Location within Auvergne-Rhône-Alpes
- Coordinates: 45°24′05″N 5°12′42″E
- Country: France
- Region: Auvergne-Rhône-Alpes
- Department: Isère
- Arrondissement: Vienne
- Canton: Bièvre
- Intercommunality: Bièvre Isère

Government
  - Mayor (2020–2026): Anne-Marie Amice
- Area^{1}: 12.15 km^{2} (4.69 sq mi)
- Highest elevation: 540 m (1,770 ft)
- Lowest elevation: 347 m (1,138 ft)
- Population (2023): 876
  - Density: 72.1/km^{2} (187/sq mi)
- Time zone: UTC+01:00 (CET)
  - Summer (DST): UTC+02:00 (CEST)
- INSEE/Postal code: 38284 /38260
- ^{1} French Land Register data, which excludes lakes, ponds, glaciers > 1 km^{2} (0.386 sq mi or 247 acres) and river estuaries.

Ornacieux-Balbins (French pronunciation: [ɔʁnasjø balbɛ̃]) is a commune in the Isère department in southeastern France. It was established on 1 January 2019 by merger of the former communes of Ornacieux (the seat) and Balbins.

== See also ==
- Communes of the Isère department
