= Pont au Double =

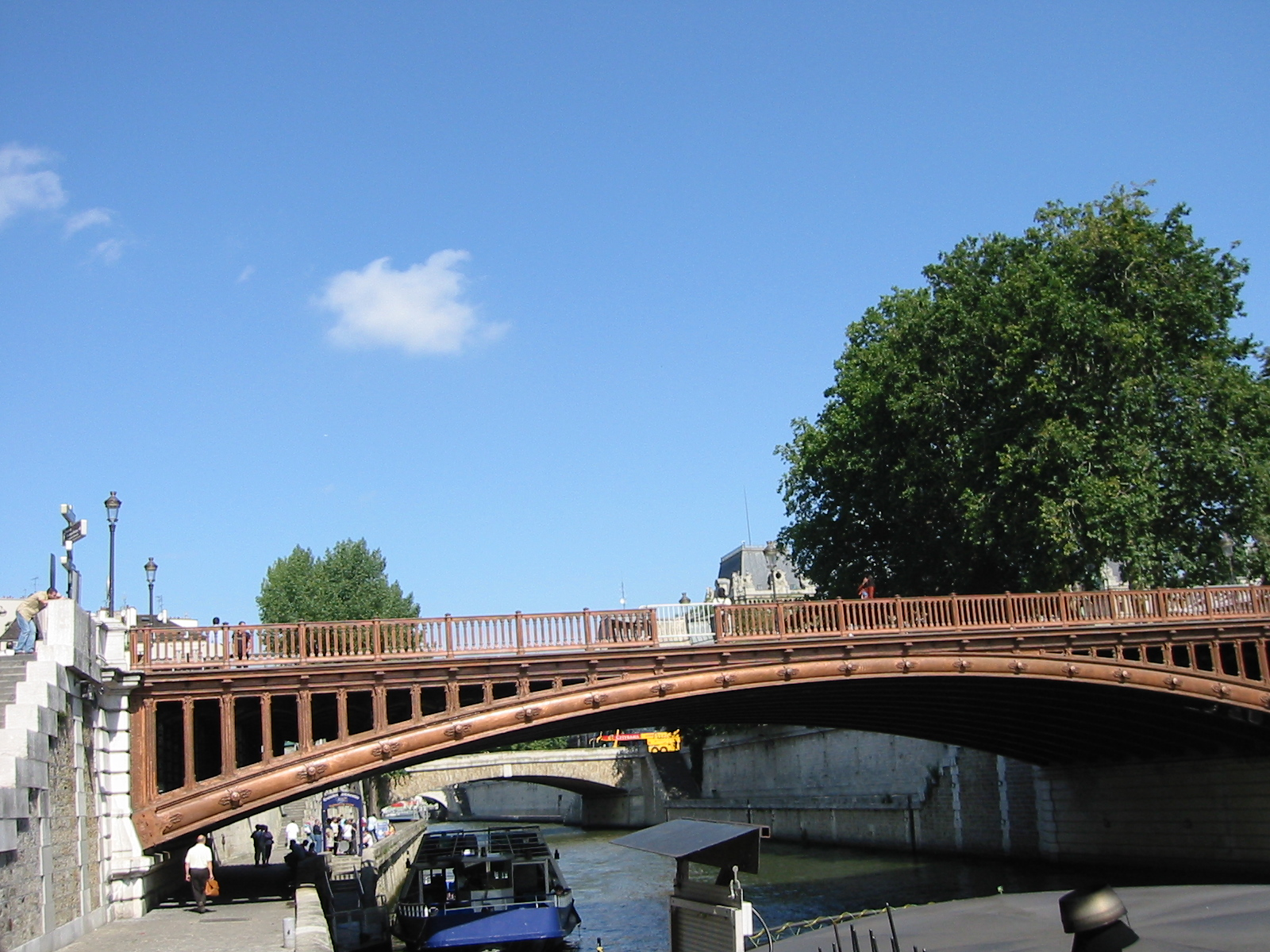
- A photograph of the Pont au Double.
- Coordinates: 48°51′09.49″N 02°20′54.56″E
- Carries: Motor vehicles, pedestrians, and bicycles
- Crosses: Seine River
- Locale: Paris, France
- Next upstream: Pont de l'Archevêché
- Next downstream: Petit Pont

Characteristics
- Design: Arch Bridge
- Total length: 45 metres (148 ft)
- Width: 20 metres (66 ft)
- Clearance below: ?

History
- Construction start: 1881
- Construction end: 1883

Statistics
- Toll: Free both ways

Location
- Interactive map of Pont au Double

The Pont au Double (French pronunciation: [pɔ̃t‿o dubl]) is a bridge over the Seine in Paris, France.

== Location ==
The bridge links the 4th and 5th arrondissements of Paris, from the Île de la Cité to the quai de Montebello.

Located near the Metro stations: Cité, Maubert-Mutualité and Cluny - La Sorbonne.

== History ==
In 1515, Francis I was asked to build a bridge over the small branch of the Seine in order to carry patients to the Hôtel-Dieu hospital on the Île de la Cité. Construction began in 1626 and in 1634 the two sides were connected.

The Pont au Double derives its name from the toll amount which was charged, a "double" denier, money used to pay for the construction of the bridge.

In 1709, the bridge collapsed. It was rebuilt and remained in place until 1847. In 1883, the Pont au Double was replaced by a one arch cast-iron bridge.

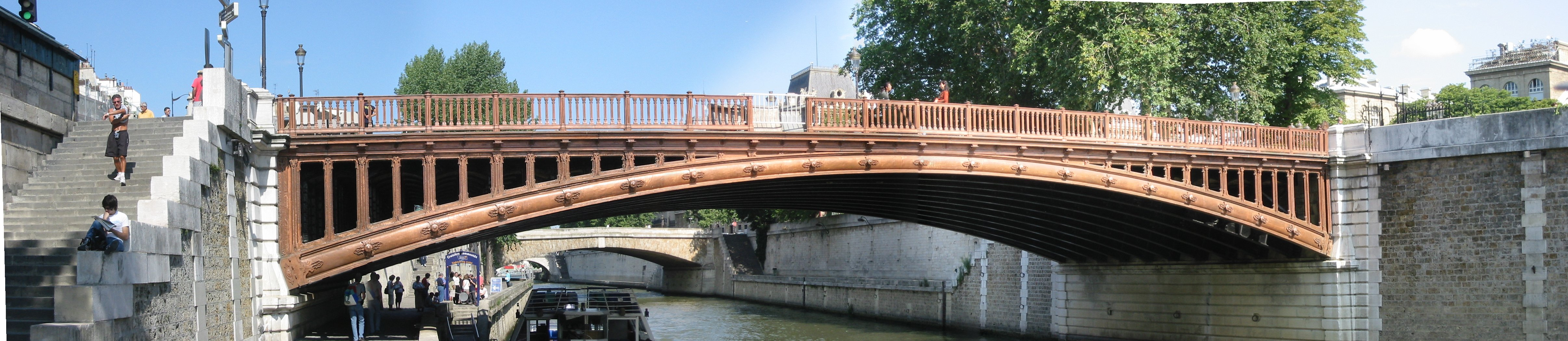
Pont au Double
