= Pont Saint-Michel =

Bridge between the Place Saint-Michel and Île de la Cité, Paris, France

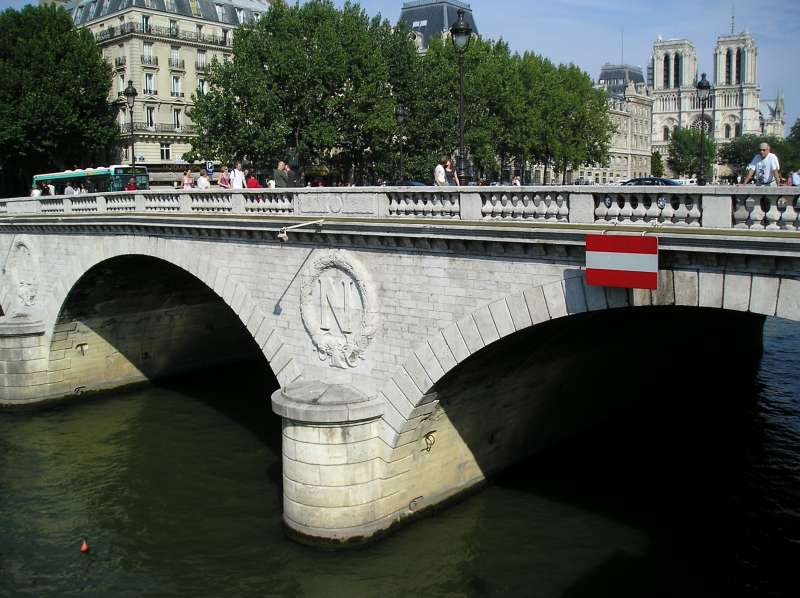
- Pont Saint-Michel with Notre-Dame de Paris in the background
- Coordinates: 48°51′15″N 02°20′41″E
- Carries: rue Saint-Denis
- Crosses: River Seine
- Locale: Paris, France
- Next upstream: Petit-Pont
- Next downstream: Pont Neuf

Characteristics
- Design: Arch bridge
- Total length: 62 metres (203 ft)
- Width: 30 metres (98 ft)

History
- Designer: Vaudrey, de Lagalisserie, Audrand, Rosier
- Opened: 1857

Location
- Interactive map of Pont Saint-Michel

Pont Saint-Michel (French pronunciation: [pɔ̃ sɛ̃ miʃɛl]) is a bridge linking the Place Saint-Michel on the left bank of the river Seine to the Île de la Cité. It was named after the nearby chapel of Saint-Michel. It is near Sainte Chapelle and the Palais de Justice. The present 62-metre-long bridge dates to 1857.

== History ==
First constructed in 1378, it has been rebuilt several times, most recently in 1857.

=== The medieval bridge ===
The construction of a stone bridge was decided upon in 1378 by the Parlement of Paris after an accord with the chapter of the cathedral of Notre-Dame de Paris, the provost of Paris, and the city's merchants. A location downstream of Petit-Pont was chosen, on the line of Rue Saint-Denis, from the Grand-Pont on the right bank and of Rue de la Harpe on the left bank. This allowed for a direct route across Île de la Cité.

The provost, Hugues Aubriot, was charged with overseeing the project, which was funded by the king. Construction lasted from 1379 to 1387. Once complete, the Parisians named the bridge Pont-Neuf (New Bridge, but it should not be confused with the present-day Pont-Neuf), Petit-Pont-Neuf (Little New Bridge) or Pont Saint-Michel dit le Pont-Neuf (St. Michael's Bridge, known as the 'New' Bridge).

As was common in the Middle Ages, the bridge's sides were quickly filled with houses. During the 1407–1408 winter, one of the longest and most severe known in the Middle Ages, ice carried by the frozen Seine hit the bridge, causing it to collapse on 31 January, together with its houses. Due to France's difficulties in the Hundred Years' War, the bridge was immediately rebuilt in wood.

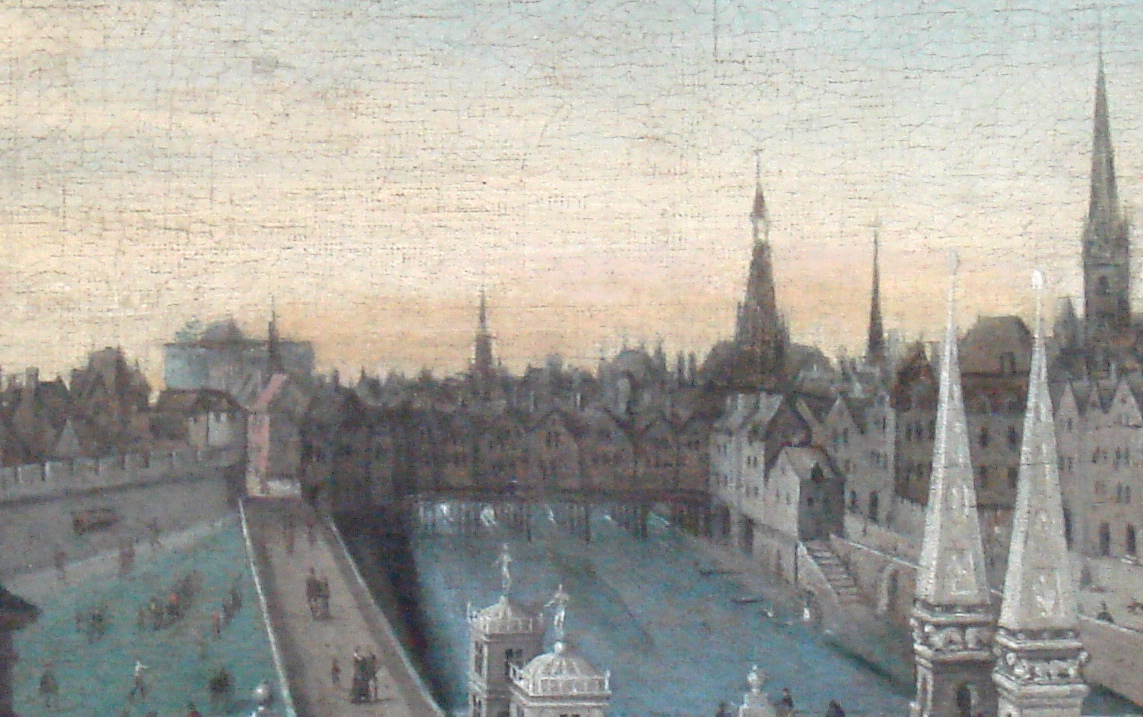
Pont Saint-Michel in 1577.

The bridge finished in 1409 stood until 1547; the third version of the bridge was finished in 1549 and stood until 1616. The appearance of this third bridge is known from one miniature painting in the Hours of Étienne Chevalier, painted by Jean Fouquet. This shows a bridge resting on high wooden piers, as well as wattle-and-daub or wood-and-plaster houses with a single level roofline along the whole length of the bridge.

=== The Renaissance bridge ===
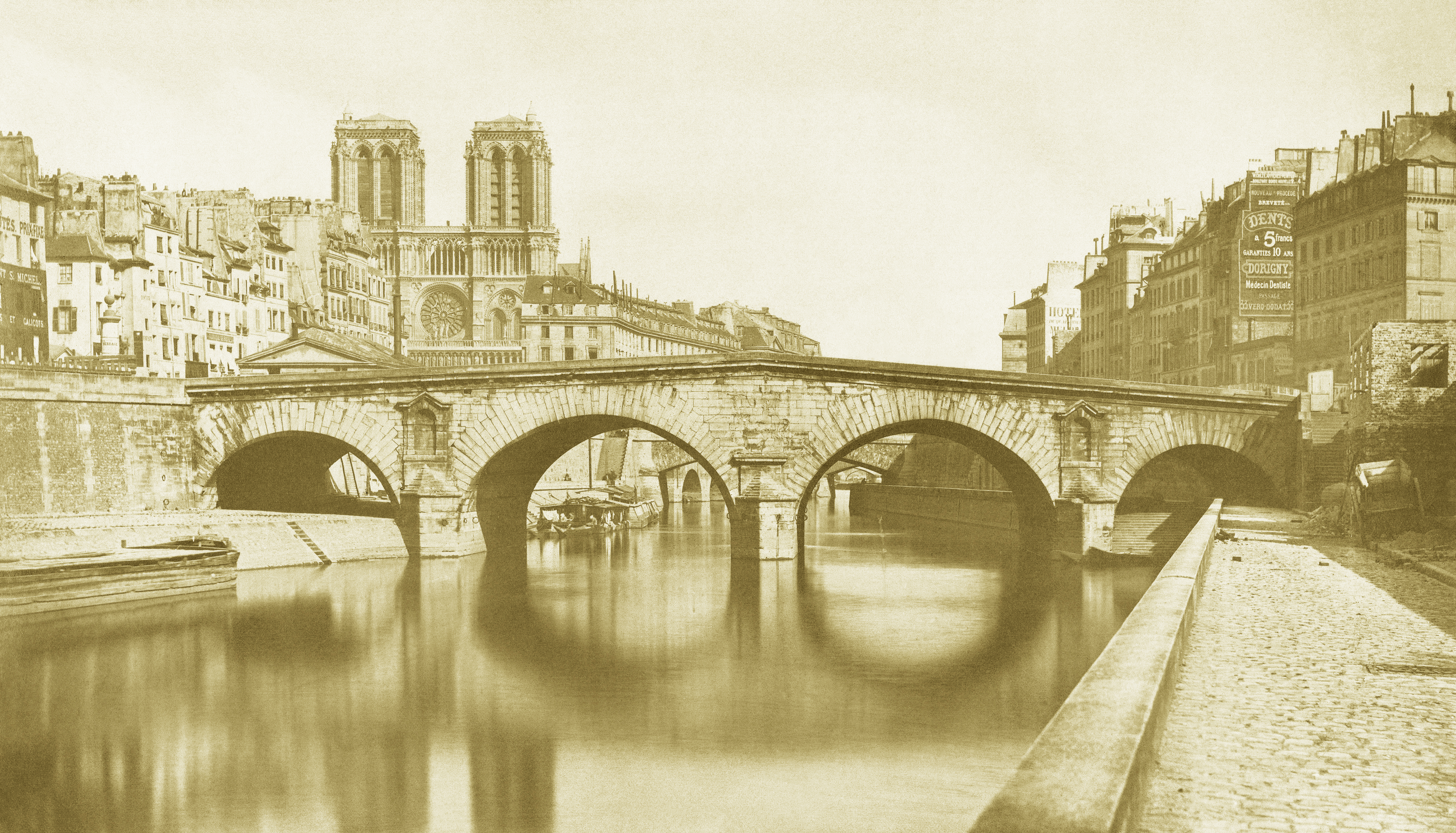
Pont Saint-Michel in 1857.

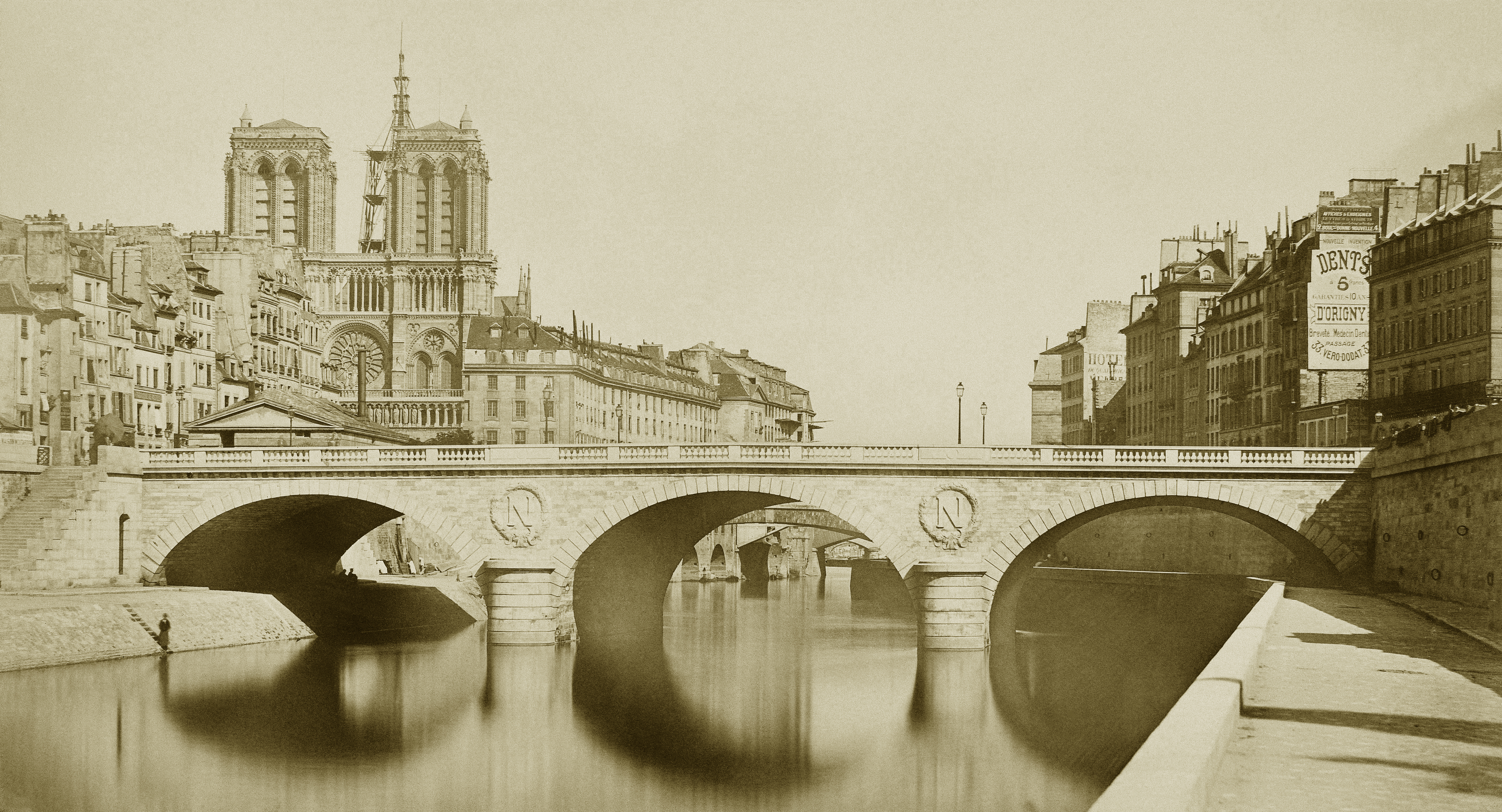
Pont Saint-Michel in 1859.

A replacement bridge was built at the same time the Pont Marie was under construction. Owned by the king, it was more substantial than the Pont Marie and never ran into the kind of structural troubles both the Pont Marie and the Pont Neuf encountered.

The work started in 1617 and was completed in 1623, using foundations similar to the ones used in the Rialto Bridge and the Pont des Boucheries. These foundations used wooden piles topped by a wooden platform over which the specifications required lower stone courses of 5 feet (1.5 m) to 6 feet (1.8 m) long by 3 feet (0.91 m) to 4 feet (1.2 m) thick.

Built with four spans in the form of circular arcs, the roadway sloped up to the center of the bridge with a grade of over 6%. The two larger spans were approximately 46 feet (14 m) long, while the two shorter spans, on either side, were approximately 33 feet (10 m) long. The widest of the old Paris bridges, it was designed to hold two rows of houses. An order was issued in 1786 to remove all houses from Paris bridges, but the ones on this bridge remained until 1808.

=== The modern bridge ===
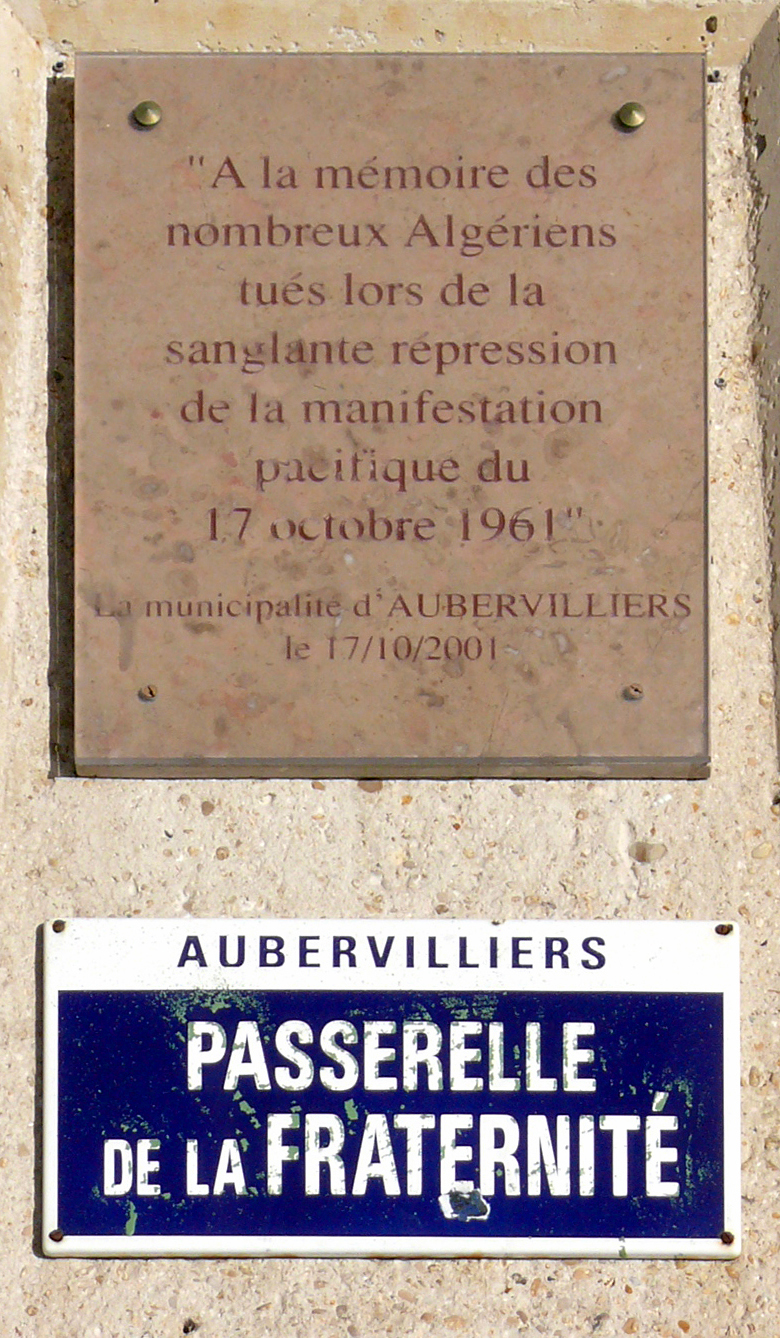
A memorial plaque for the many Algerians killed on 17 October 1961, many were thrown from Saint-Michel bridge into the seine by Parisian police officers who were acting under orders of the Prefect of Police, Maurice Papon.

The present 62-metre-long bridge dates to 1857, requiring only seven months for construction, from the date the older bridge was closed to traffic, and was designed on three 17.2m arches by Paul Gallocher de Lagalisserie and Paul Vaudrey. It was the site of many of the killings of protesters by the police, in the 1961 Paris massacre, and a commemoration plaque on the bridge was unveiled by the mayor of Paris in 2001.

== Location ==
Location on the Seine

The entrances to two underground stations are located next to the bridge in Place Saint-Michel. Saint-Michel is on line 4 of the Paris Métro, whilst Saint-Michel-Notre-Dame is on line B and line C of the Paris Réseau Express Régional (RER).

== Gallery ==
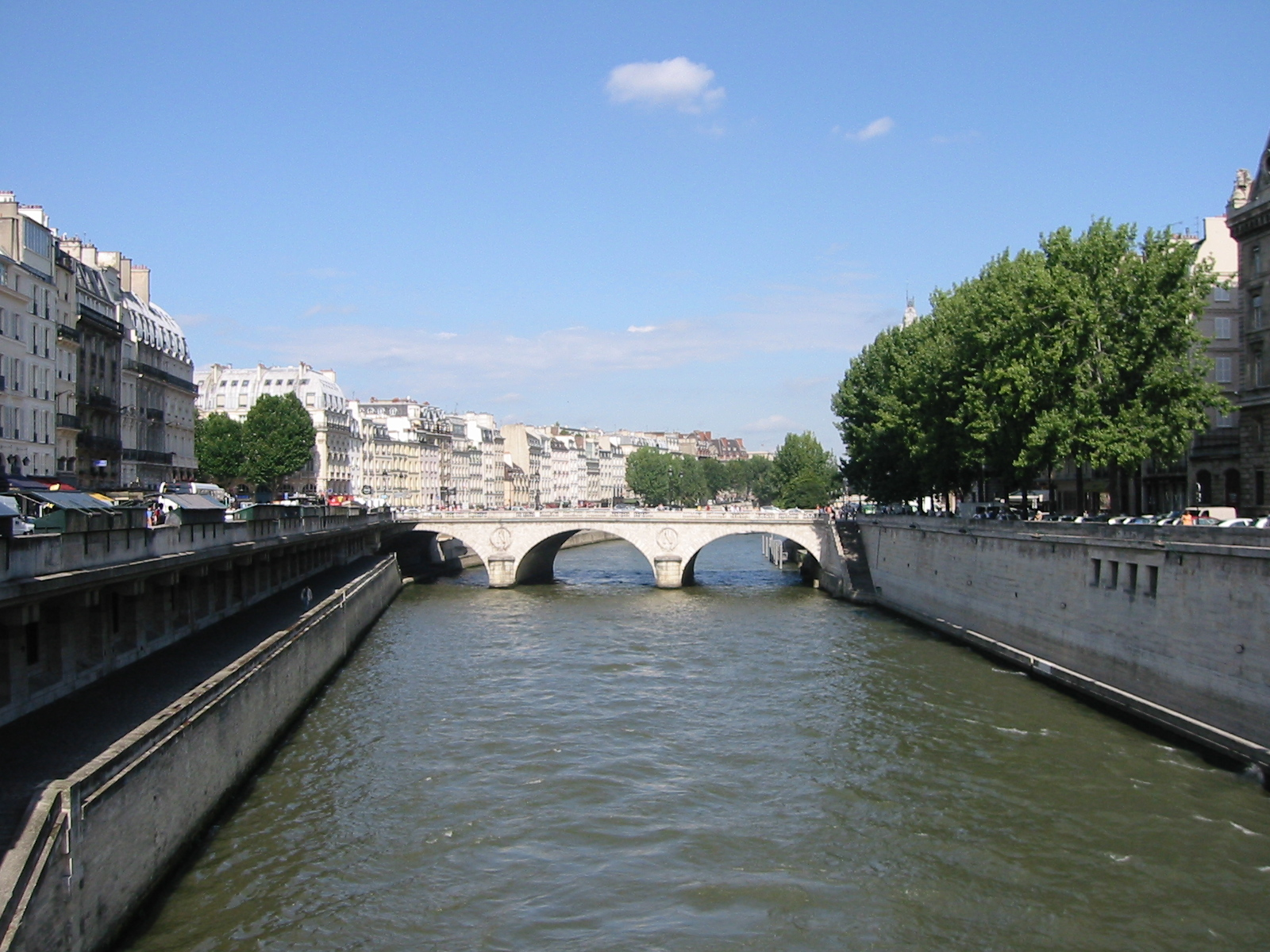
View from Petit-Pont

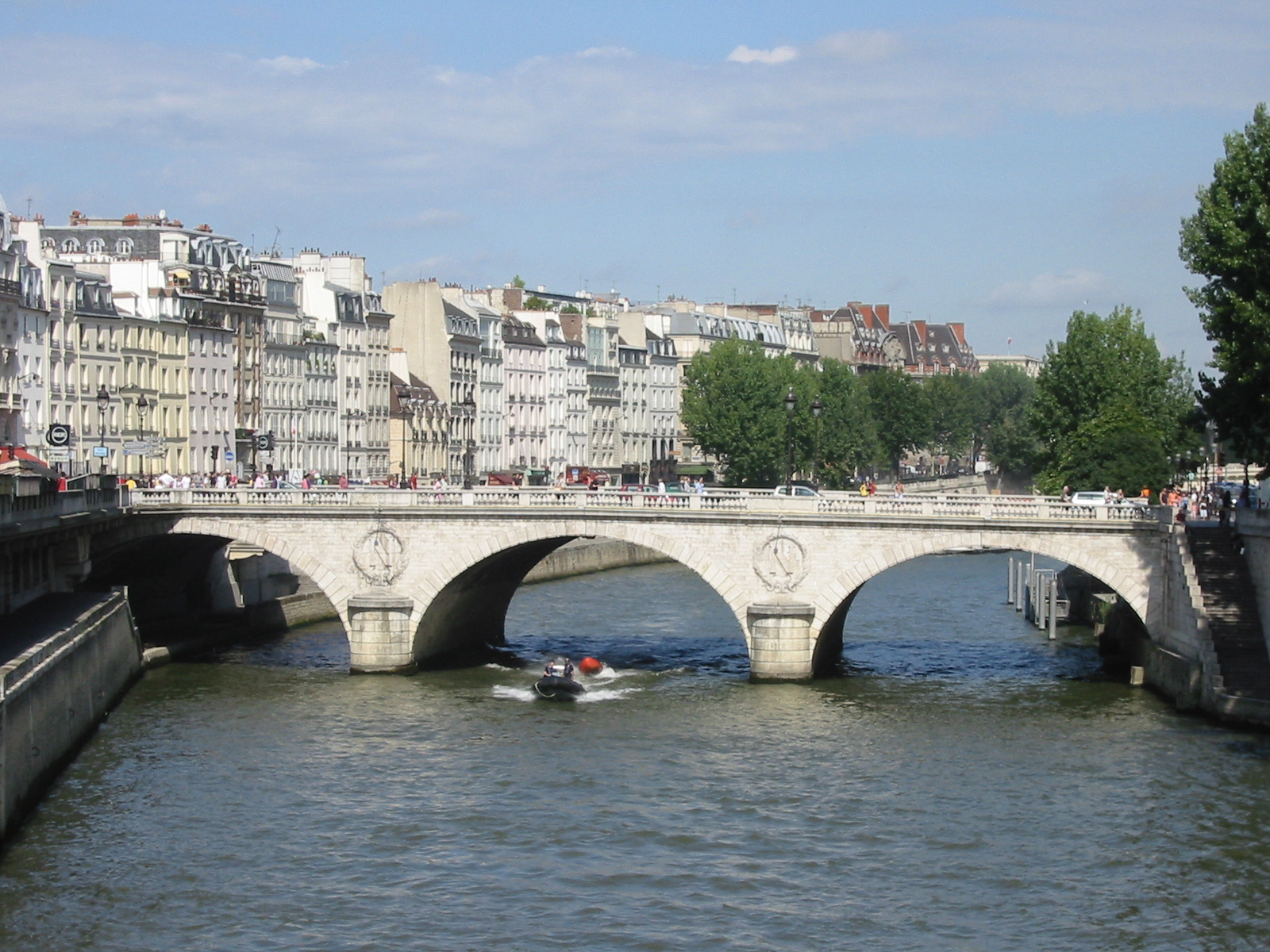
View from Petit-Pont

== Bibliography ==
- (in French) P. Lorentz et D. Sandron, Atlas de Paris au Moyen Âge, Paris, 2006, Parigramme.
- (in German with English summary) Miron Mislin (2011). "Der Pont St. Michel in Paris und die Mühlendammbrücke in Berlin. Planungs- und Bauprozess von überbauten Brücken im 14.–19. Jahrhundert" [Pont St. Michel in Paris and Mühlendammbrücke in Berlin – The Planning and Building Processes of Bridges with Houses from 14th–19th century]. In: Bayerische Gesellschaft für Unterwasserarchäologie (ed.). Archäologie der Brücken. Vorgeschichte, Antike, Mittelalter, Neuzeit. Archaeology of Bridges. Prehistory, Antiquity, Middle Ages, Modern Era. Regensburg: Pustet, ISBN 978-3-7917-2331-0, pp. 289–293.
