= Redoute de Gravelle =

Coordinates: 48°49′8″N 2°27′16″E

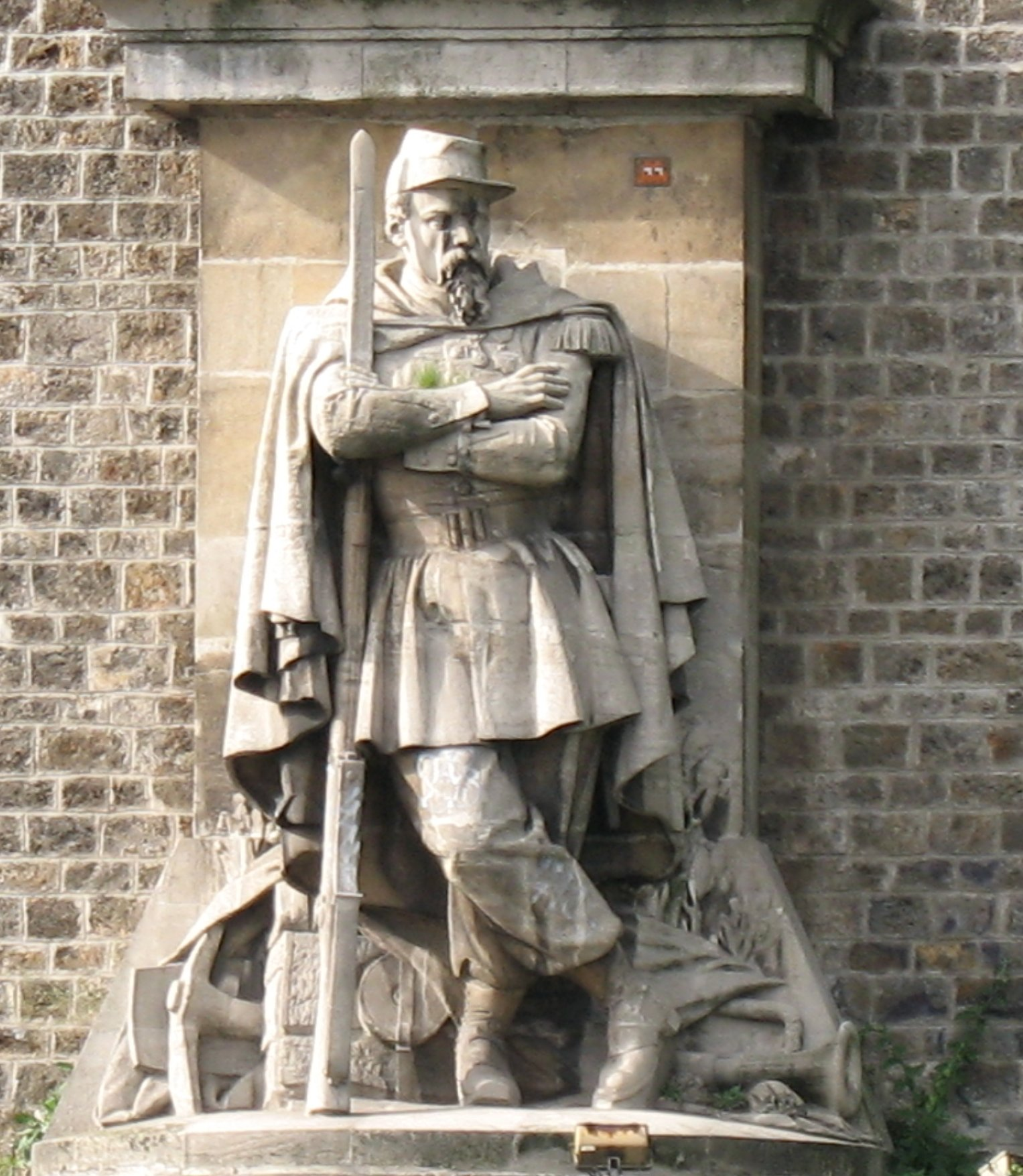
The Skirmisher by Auguste Arnaud at the Redoute de Gravelle. The statue was taken from the Pont de l'Alma in Paris.

The redoute de Gravelle (Gravelle redoubt) is a fort in Joinville-le-Pont, situated to the south-east of Vincennes in Paris. Built in 1846 under Louis-Philippe, from 1968 it housed the École nationale de police de Paris (ENPP), before becoming an illegal immigrants detention centre. Its south face is decorated with Auguste Arnaud's statue of a skirmisher, formerly placed next to one of a zouave on the old pont de l'Alma, but moved to its present position after the construction of the A4 autoroute in 1973. The statue is visible from the A4.
