= Auguste Arnaud =

French sculptor

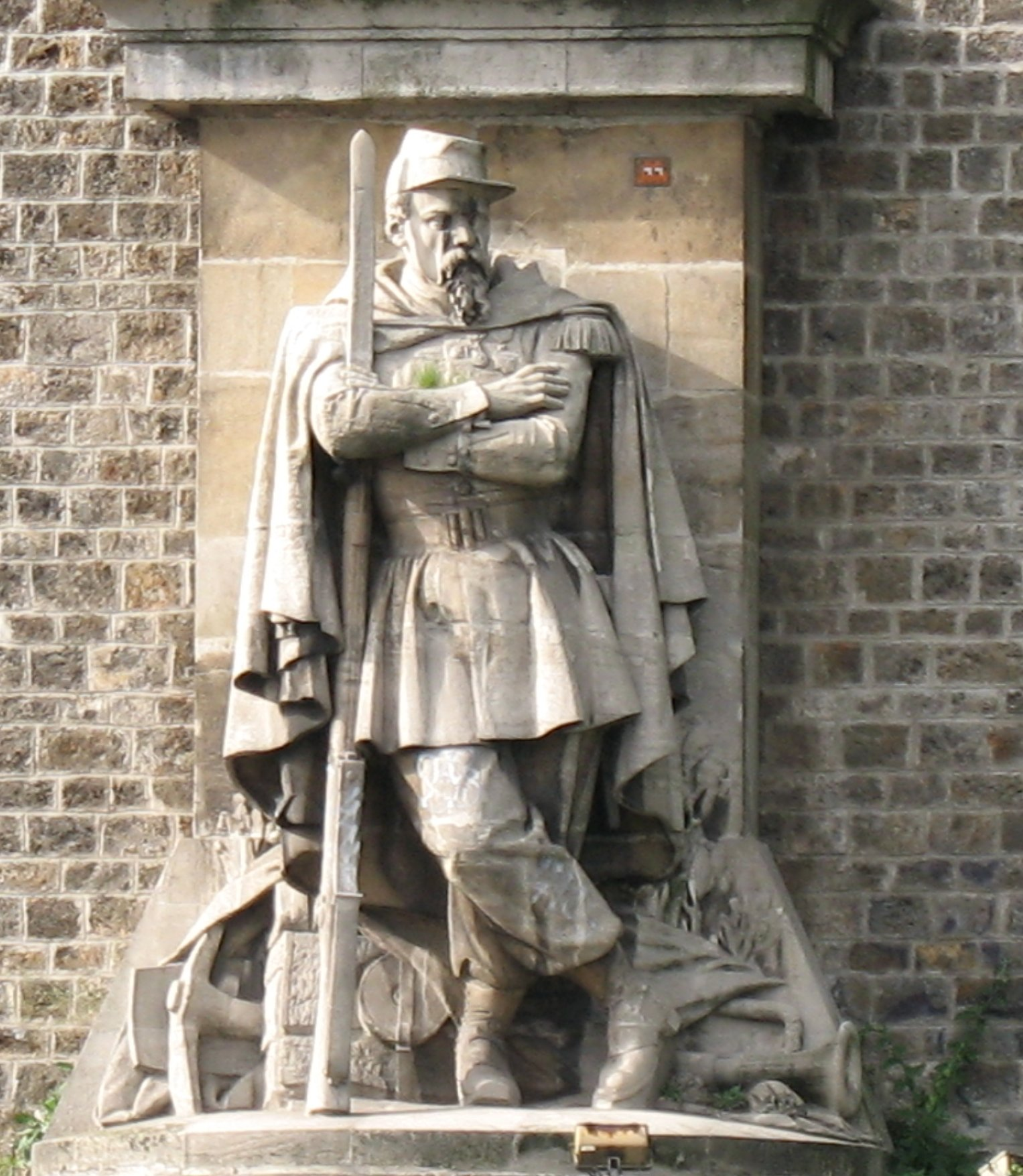
The Skirmisher by Auguste Arnaud at the Redoute de Gravelle, a military redoubt in Joinville-le-Pont. The statue was taken from the Pont de l'Alma in Paris.

Charles Auguste Arnaud (22 August 1825 – 6 September 1883), known as Auguste Arnaud was a French sculptor.

== Life ==
Arnaud was born at La Rochelle. A student of the École des Beaux-Arts at Angers, he first came to Paris thanks to a scholarship for his département, joining the workshop of François Rude. There he exhibited at the entry competition for the Paris École des Beaux-Arts in 1842. He exhibited regularly at the Salon from 1846 to 1865.

Producing several busts, such as those of the Comte de Clarac (commissioned in 1852 for the Louvre), the architect Fontaine (1854–1858), Ferdinand de Lesseps and the composer Halévy, Arnaud also produced monumental works such as the "Le Chasseur à pied" and "L'Artilleur" for the pont de l'Alma in 1856–57 – with "Le Zouave" et "Le Grenadier" by Georges Diebolt, these symbolised the victory of France and her allies at the Battle of the Alma in the Crimean War on 20 September 1854. He conceived the tympanum and 35 statues relating to the life of the Virgin for Sées's cathedral in 1852 and, for his birthplace of La Rochelle, he designed a monument to M. Fleuriau de Bellevue (bust and bas-relief in bronze) in 1853.

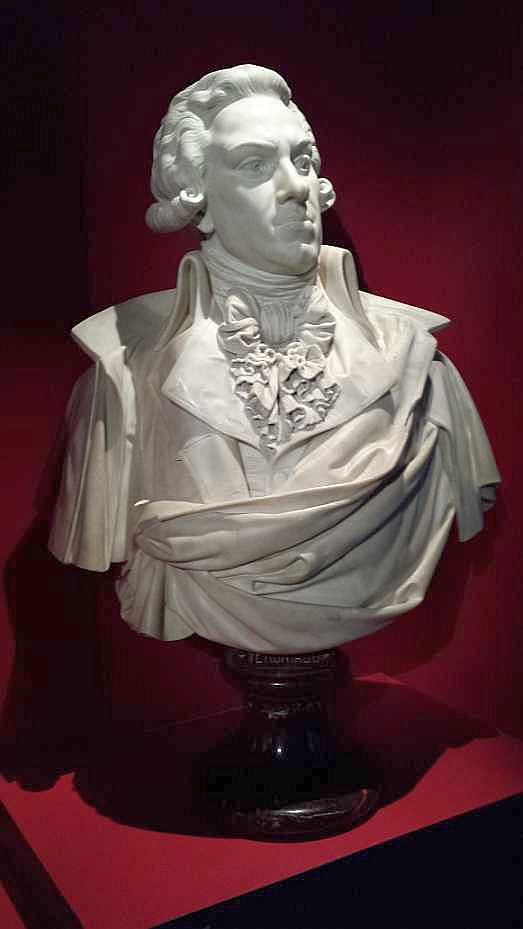
Pierre Victournien Vergniaud, bust of Charles Auguste Arnaud, Bordeaux Musée d’Aquitaine

Having failed to win an 1858 competition for a commission to create a statue of king Don Pedro II of Portugal, and affected by the failure of his Vénus aux cheveux d'or (Golden-haired Venus) at the Salon of 1863 despite its purchase by Napoleon III, Arnaud fell little by little into madness. He died horribly in a railway accident in 1883.

== Works ==
- Portrait of comte Charles Othon Frédéric Jean-Baptiste de Clarac, conservateur of antiquities at the Louvre (1777–1847) (1854), herm bust, marble, Paris, musée du Louvre
- Portrait of Pierre François Léonard Fontaine, architect of the Louvre (1762–1853) (1857), herm bust, marble, Paris, musée du Louvre

== Sources ==
- Geneviève Bresc-Bautier, Isabelle Leroy-Jay Lemaistre (sous la direction de Jean-René Gaborit, avec la collaboration de Jean-Charles Agboton, Hélène Grollemund, Michèle Lafabrie, Béatrice Tupinier-Barillon), Musée du Louvre. département des sculptures du Moyen Âge, de la Renaissance et des temps modernes. Sculpture française II. Renaissance et temps modernes. vol. 1 Adam - Gois, Éditions de la Réunion des musées nationaux, Paris, 1998
