= Ornacieux =

Commune in Isère, France

- Part of Ornacieux-Balbins
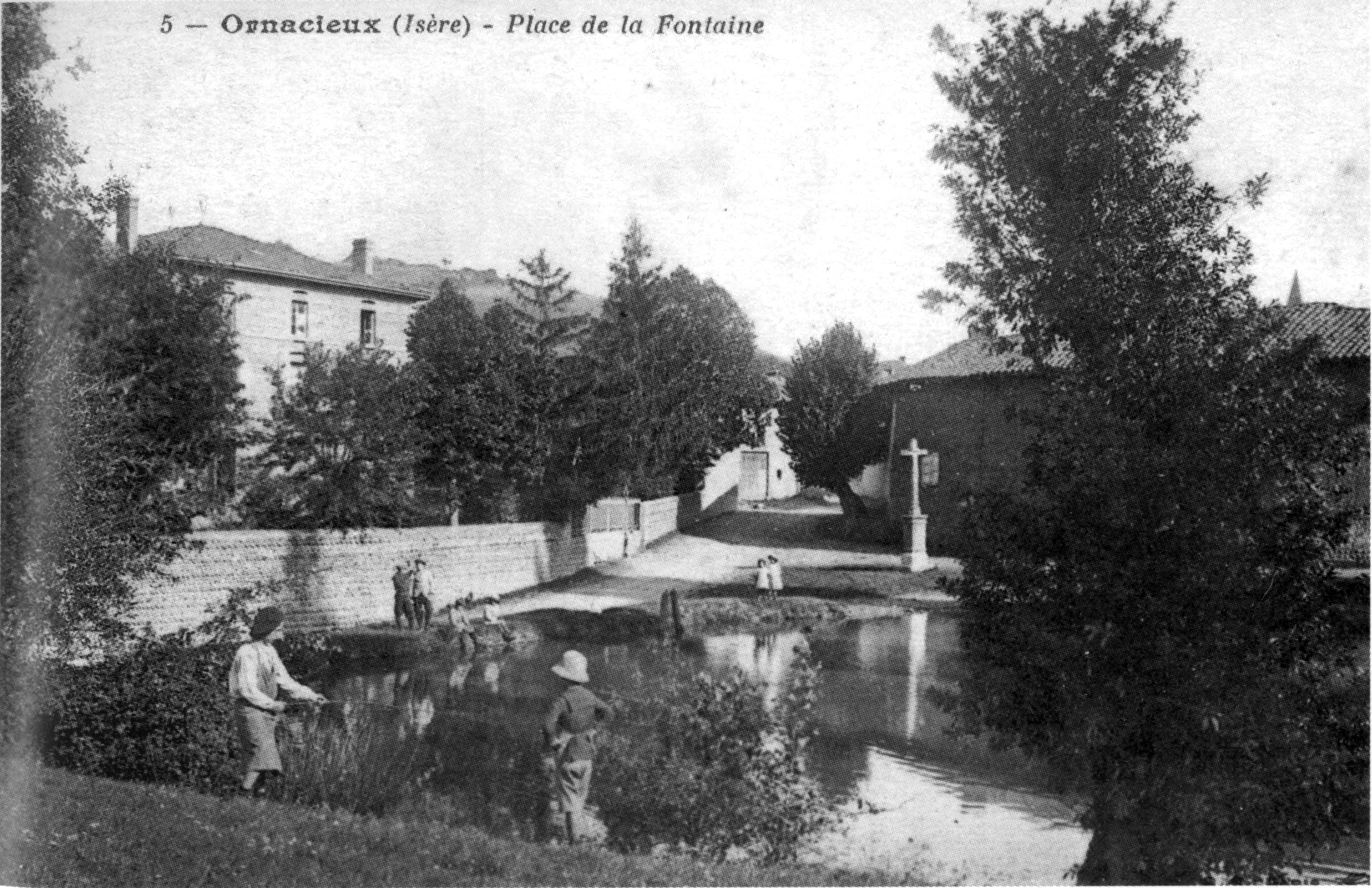
- Ornacieux in 1909

- Coat of arms
- Location of Ornacieux
- Location within France Location within Auvergne-Rhône-Alpes
- Coordinates: 45°24′05″N 5°12′42″E
- Country: France
- Region: Auvergne-Rhône-Alpes
- Department: Isère
- Arrondissement: Vienne
- Canton: Bièvre
- Commune: Ornacieux-Balbins
- Area^{1}: 4.89 km^{2} (1.89 sq mi)
- Elevation: 975 m (3,199 ft)
- Highest elevation: 540 m (1,770 ft)
- Lowest elevation: 371 m (1,217 ft)
- Population (2023): 420
  - Density: 86/km^{2} (220/sq mi)
- Time zone: UTC+01:00 (CET)
  - Summer (DST): UTC+02:00 (CEST)
- Postal code: 38260
- ^{1} French Land Register data, which excludes lakes, ponds, glaciers > 1 km^{2} (0.386 sq mi or 247 acres) and river estuaries.

Ornacieux (French pronunciation: [ɔʁnasjø]) is a former commune in the Isère department in southeastern France. On 1 January 2019, it was merged into the new commune Ornacieux-Balbins.

== See also ==
- Communes of the Isère department
