= Pont d'Austerlitz =

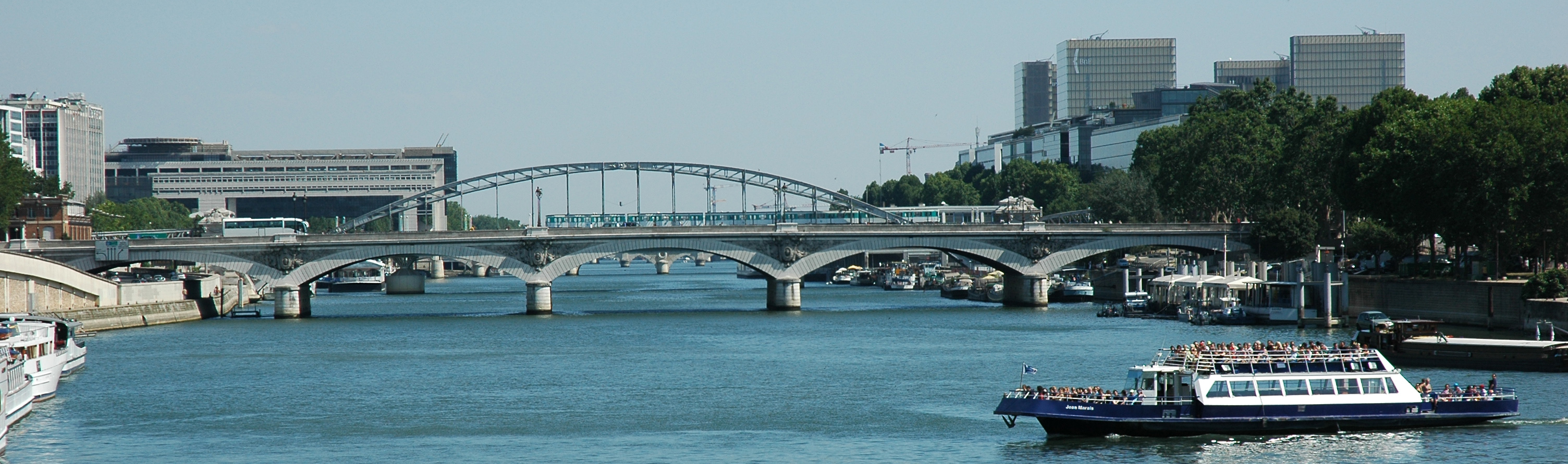
- Coordinates: 48°50′42″N 2°21′58″E
- Carries: Motor vehicles, pedestrians, and bicycles
- Crosses: The Seine River
- Locale: Paris, France
- Official name: Pont d'Austerlitz
- Next upstream: Viaduc d'Austerlitz
- Next downstream: Pont de Sully

Characteristics
- Design: Arch Bridge
- Total length: 174m (571 feet)
- Width: 30m (98 feet)

History
- Construction start: 1801–1805, 1854 and 1884–1885

Statistics
- Toll: Free both ways

The Pont d'Austerlitz is a bridge which crosses the Seine River in Paris, France. It owes its name to the battle of Austerlitz (1805).

== Location ==
The bridge links the 12th arrondissement at the rue Ledru-Rollin, to the 5th and 13th arrondissements, at the Jardin des Plantes.

== History ==
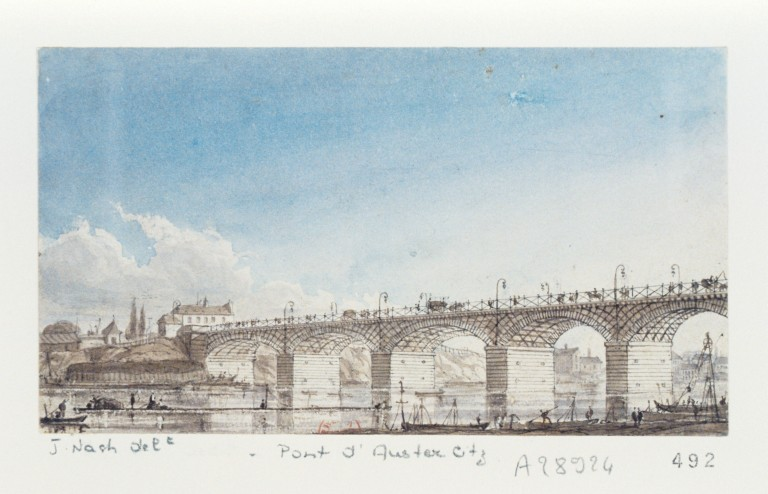

The construction of the bridge came from a necessity to link the Faubourg Saint-Antoine on the right bank to the Jardin des Plantes on the left bank. At the beginning of the 19th century the first bridge was constructed. In 1801, the engineer Becquey de Beaupré proposed a five-arched bridge. In 1854, the bridge was judged dangerous and the width was increased to 18 meters (59 feet) and finally to 30 meters (98 feet).

== Characteristics ==
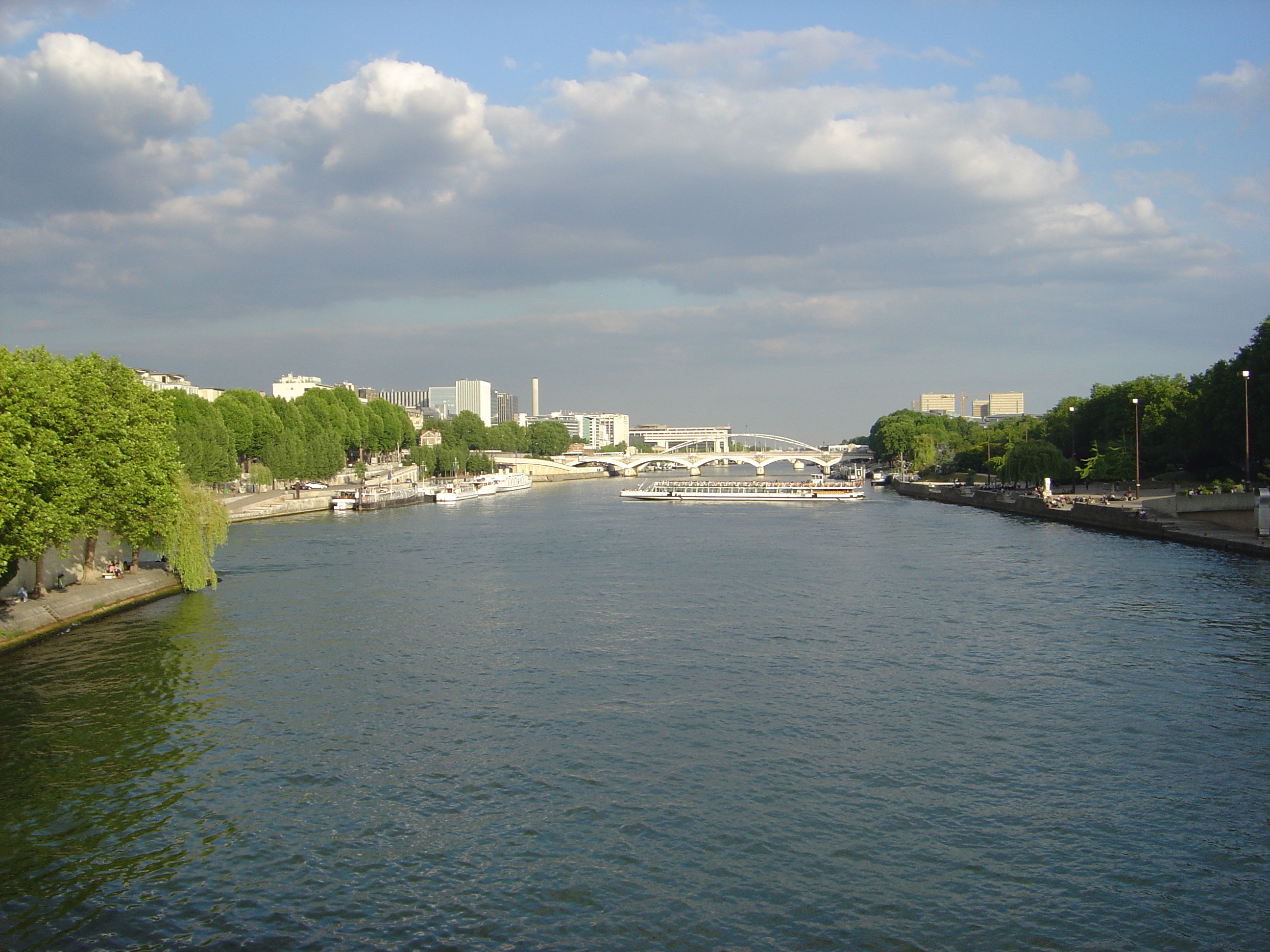
View from the Pont de Sully

- Type : Arch bridge
- Construction : 1801–1805, 1854 and 1884–1885
- Inauguration : 1854 and 1885
- Architects : Alexandre Michal, Jules Savarin (1854) – Jean-Marie-Georges Choquet (1885)
- Material : Stone Masonry
- Total Length : 173,80 m

== Access ==
Location on the Seine

| Located near the Métro station: Quai de la Rapée. |

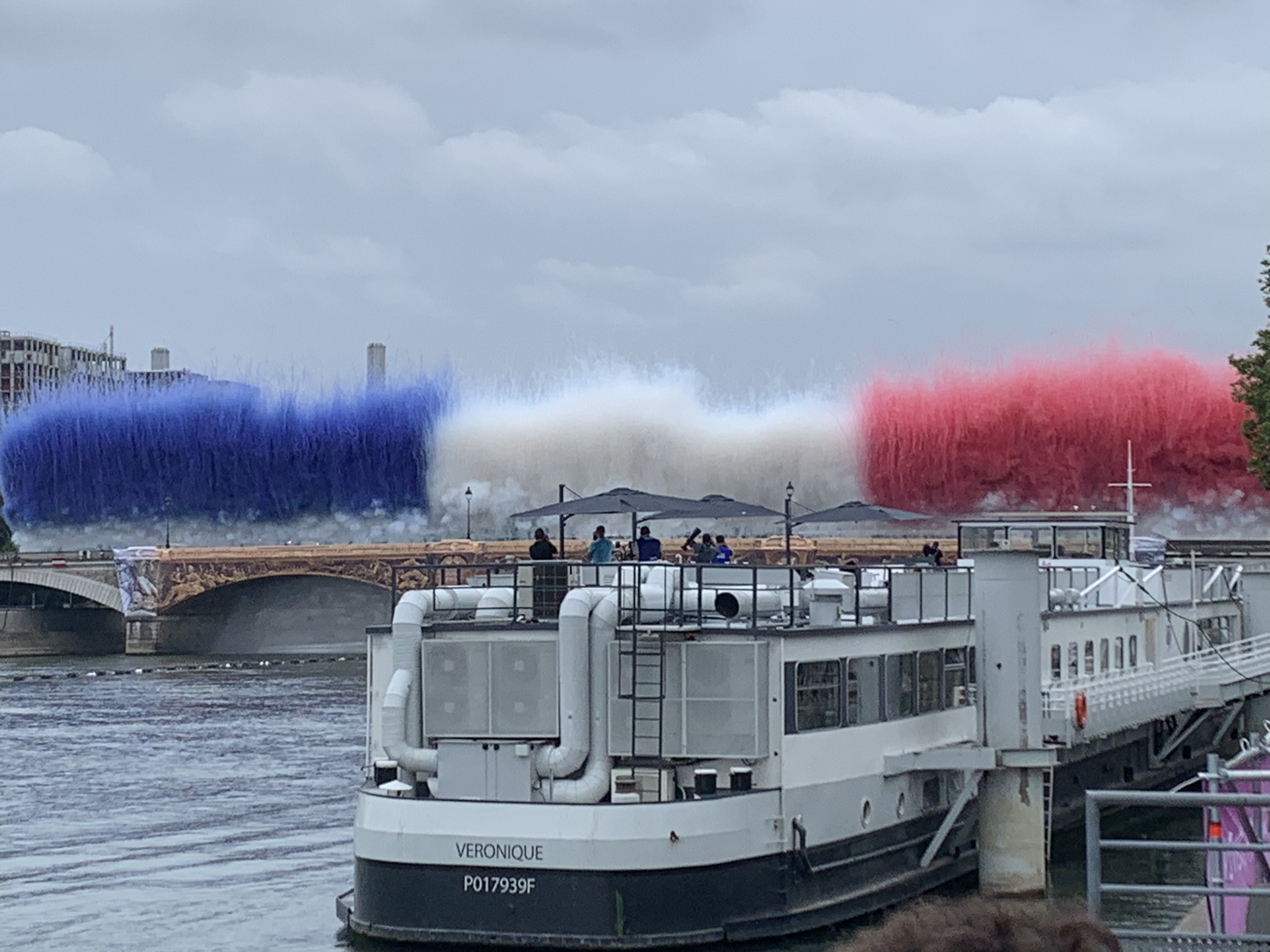
Pont d’Austerlitz during the 2024 Summer Olympics opening ceremony

== See also ==
- List of crossings of the River Seine
- New Bridge, Mitrovica
