= Vareilles =

Vareilles is the name or part of the name of several communes in France:

- Vareilles, Creuse
- Vareilles, Saône-et-Loire
- Vareilles, Yonne

Vareille and Vareilles are surnames of French origin. People with those names include;

- Jérôme Vareille (born 1974), French footballer
- Patrice Vareilles (born 1978), French footballer

== See also ==
- Varilhes, a commune in the Ariège department in southwestern France
