= 1910 Great Flood of Paris =

Flooding of Paris, France in January–March, 1910 by the river Seine

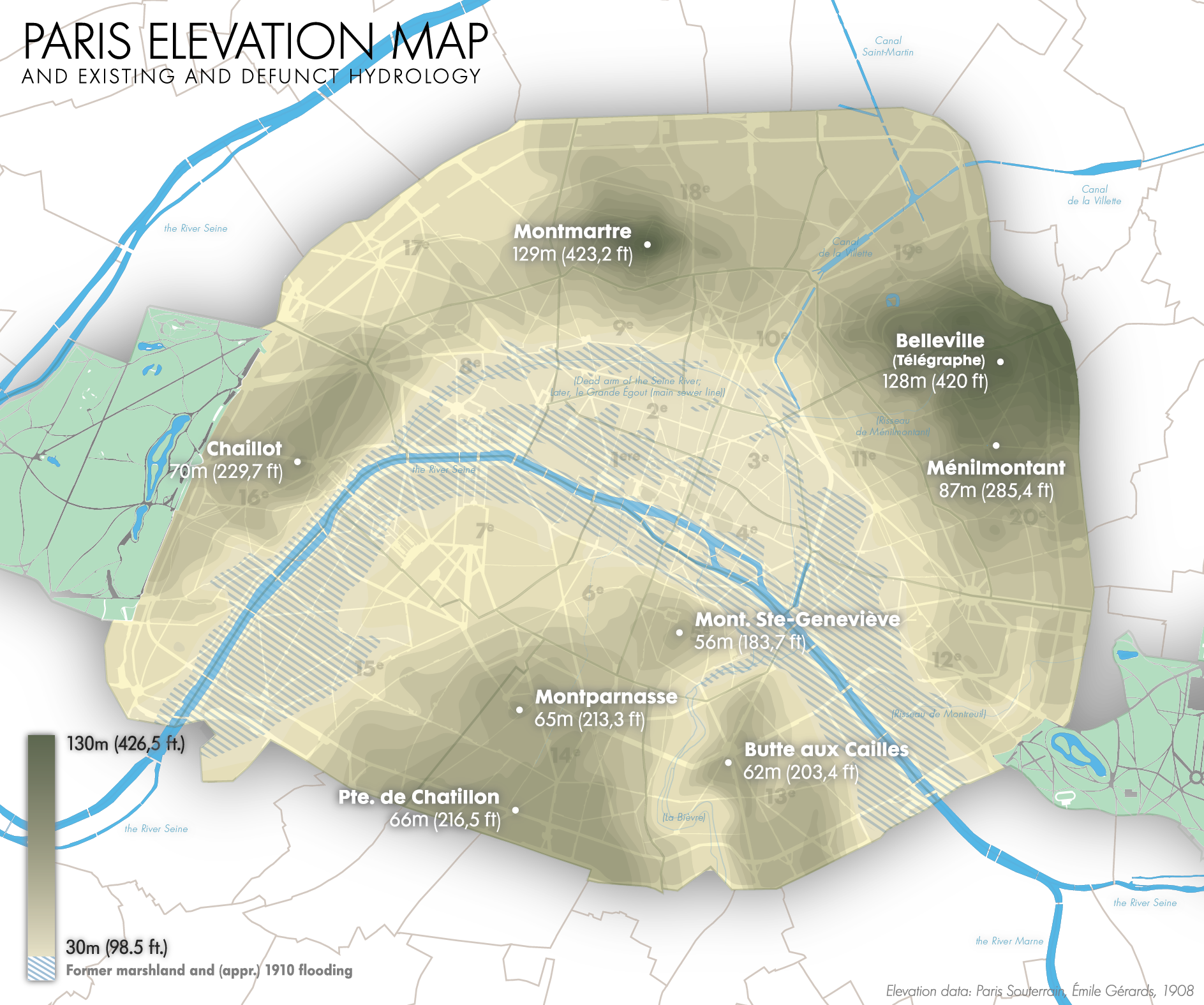
Map of Paris with blue hatched zone representing approximately the floods of 1910.

The 1910 Great Flood of Paris (French: Crue de la Seine de 1910) was a catastrophe in which the Seine River, carrying winter rains from its tributaries, flooded the conurbation of Paris, France. The Seine water level rose eight meters (more than 26 feet) above the ordinary level.

== Chronology ==
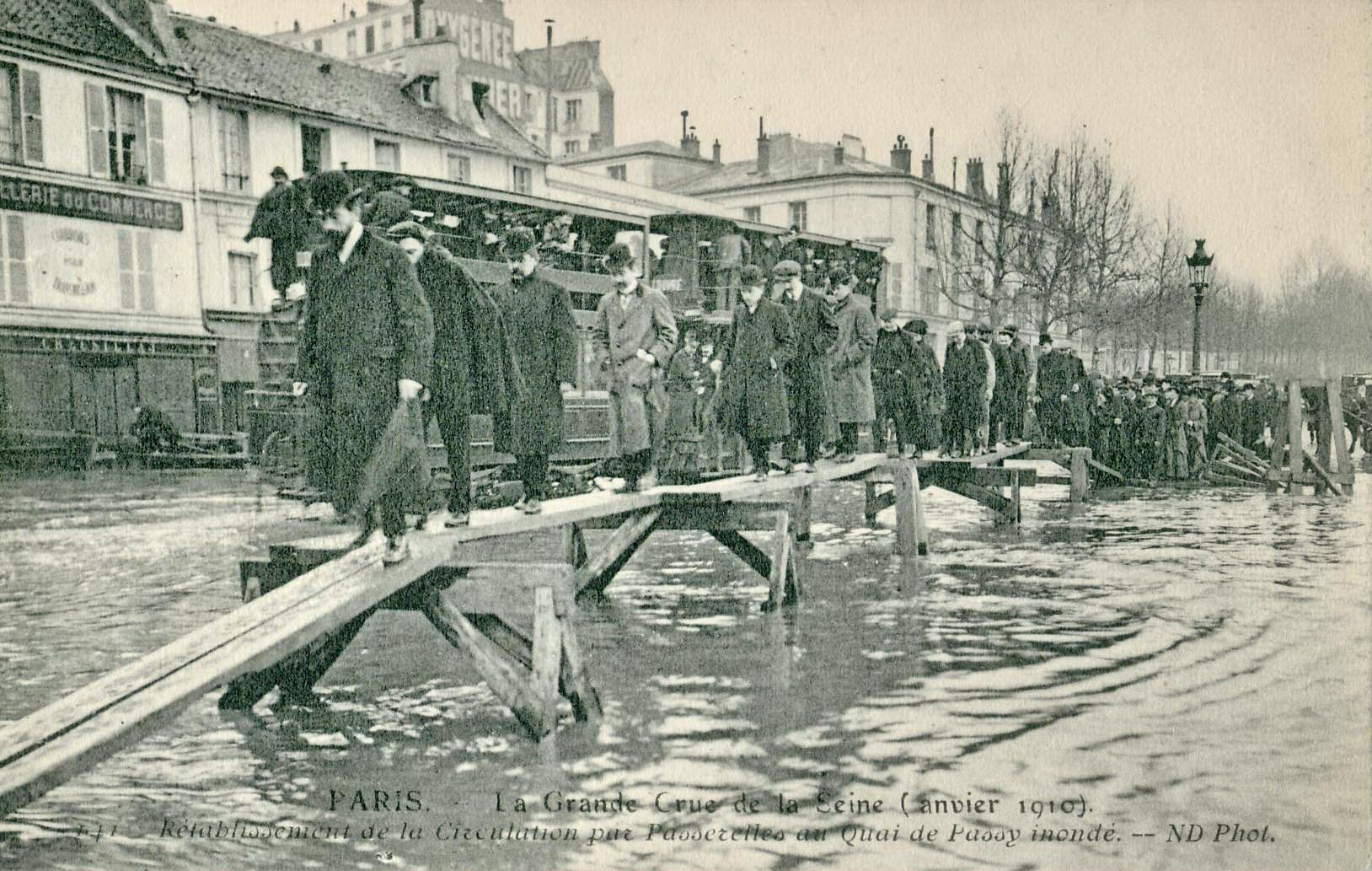
During the flood on Quai de Passy

In the winter of 1909–1910, Paris and the surrounding area experienced higher than normal rainfall, which saturated the ground and caused rivers to overflow. In January 1910, Parisians were focused on daily life and lulled into a false sense of security because the Seine's water level had risen and fallen again in December. As a result, they largely ignored reports of mudslides and flooding occurring upriver. They were also slow to notice warnings signs within the city as the Seine's water level rose eight meters (26 feet) above normal; its water began to flow much faster than usual, and large amounts of debris appeared.

By late January, water pushed upwards from overflowing sewers and subway tunnels, then seeping into basements through fully saturated soil and backed-up sewer systems. This caused damage to the basements of several buildings. The river did not break its banks within the city, but flooded Paris through the tunnels, sewers, and drains. The larger sewer tunnels, which had been engineered by Baron Haussmann and Eugene Belgrand in 1878, worsened the destruction caused by the 1910 floods. In neighboring towns both east and west of the capital, the river rose above its banks and flooded the surrounding terrain directly.

Winter floods were common in Paris, but on 21 January the river began to rise more rapidly than usual. This was treated as a sort of spectacle and people actually stood in the streets watching the water levels climb. Over the course of the following week, thousands of Parisians were evacuated from their homes as water infiltrated buildings and streets throughout the city, shutting down much of the city's basic infrastructure. The infrastructure was more vulnerable to flooding because most of it was built within the sewage system in order to avoid cluttering the streets.

Police, firemen, and soldiers navigated the waterlogged streets by boats to rescue stranded residents from second-story windows and distribute aid. Refugees gathered in makeshift shelters in churches, schools, and government buildings. Although the water threatened to overflow the tops of the quay walls lining the river, workers were able to hold back the Seine with hastily built levees.

After the river invaded the Gare d'Orsay rail terminal, the tracks were submerged under more than a meter (3.28 feet) of water. To continue moving throughout the city, residents traveled by boat or crossed a series of wooden walkways built by government engineers and civilians.

On 28 January, the water reached its maximum height at 8.62 meters (28.3 feet) above normal. The Seine finally returned to its normal levels in March.

== Consequences ==
Estimates of the flood damage reached about four hundred million francs, or roughly $1.5 billion in today's currency. The flooding lasted nearly a week, according to one report. Despite the scale of the damage, no deaths were reported.

There were fears of a disease outbreak after debris from flooded homes piled up in the streets, but no significant outbreak occurred.

== Literature and media ==
- The Knowledge of Water by Sarah Smith, Ballantine, New York (1996) ISBN 0-345-39135-7
- The flood provided the setting for the 2011 animated film A Monster in Paris.
- In Stealing Mona Lisa (2011) by Carson Morton, the flood is the setting of the climax of the novel. ISBN 9780312621711
- In Bertrand Bonello's 2023 film, The Beast, the flood is depicted.

== Image gallery ==
Pont Alexandre III during the flood

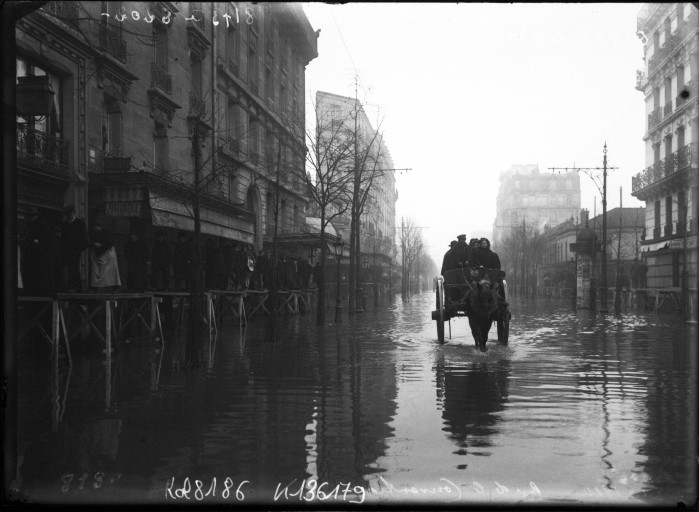
rue de la Convention

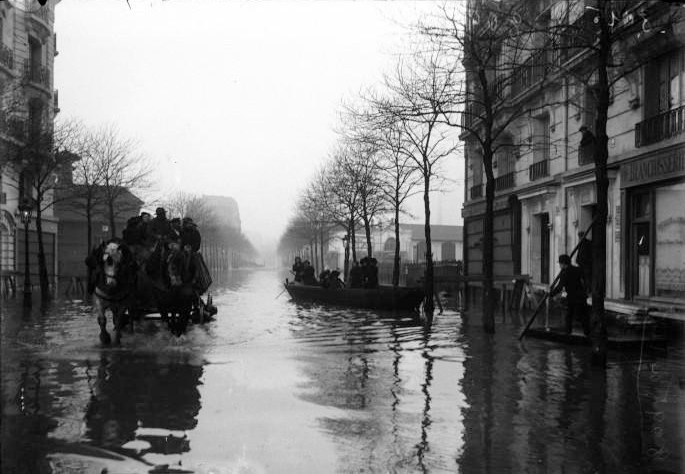
Avenue Félix-Faure

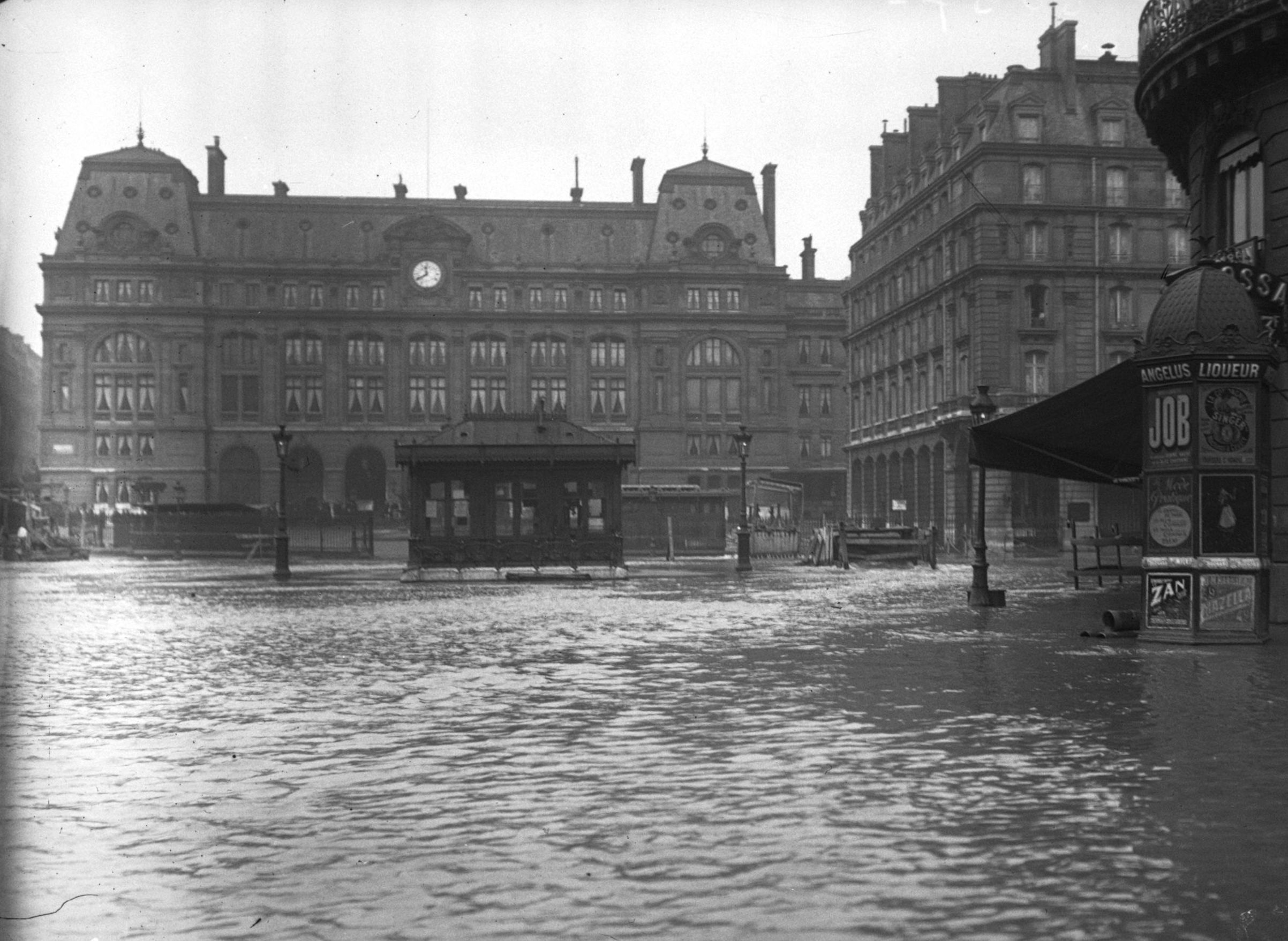
Cour de Rome, gare Saint-Lazare

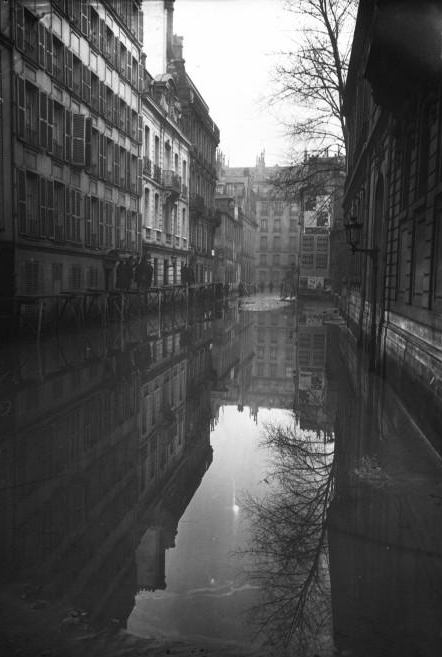
Rue de Poitiers

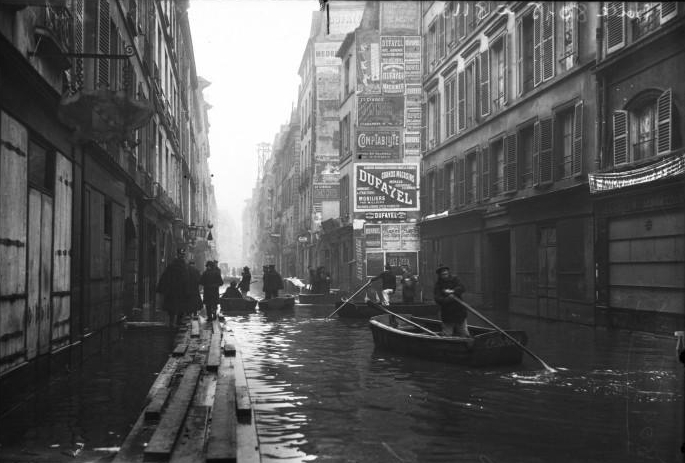
Rue de Seine

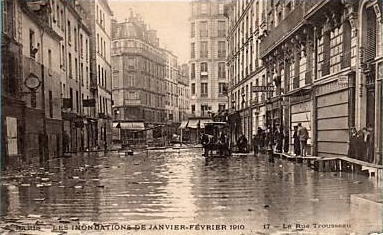
Rue Trousseau

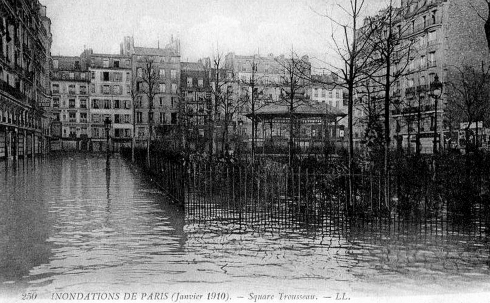
Trousseau Square

== Sources ==
Jeffrey H. Jackson, Paris Under Water: How the City of Light Survived the Great Flood of 1910 (NY: Palgrave Macmillan, 2010)
