= Rue Crémieux =

Street in Paris, France

Coordinates: 48°50′49″N 2°22′16″E

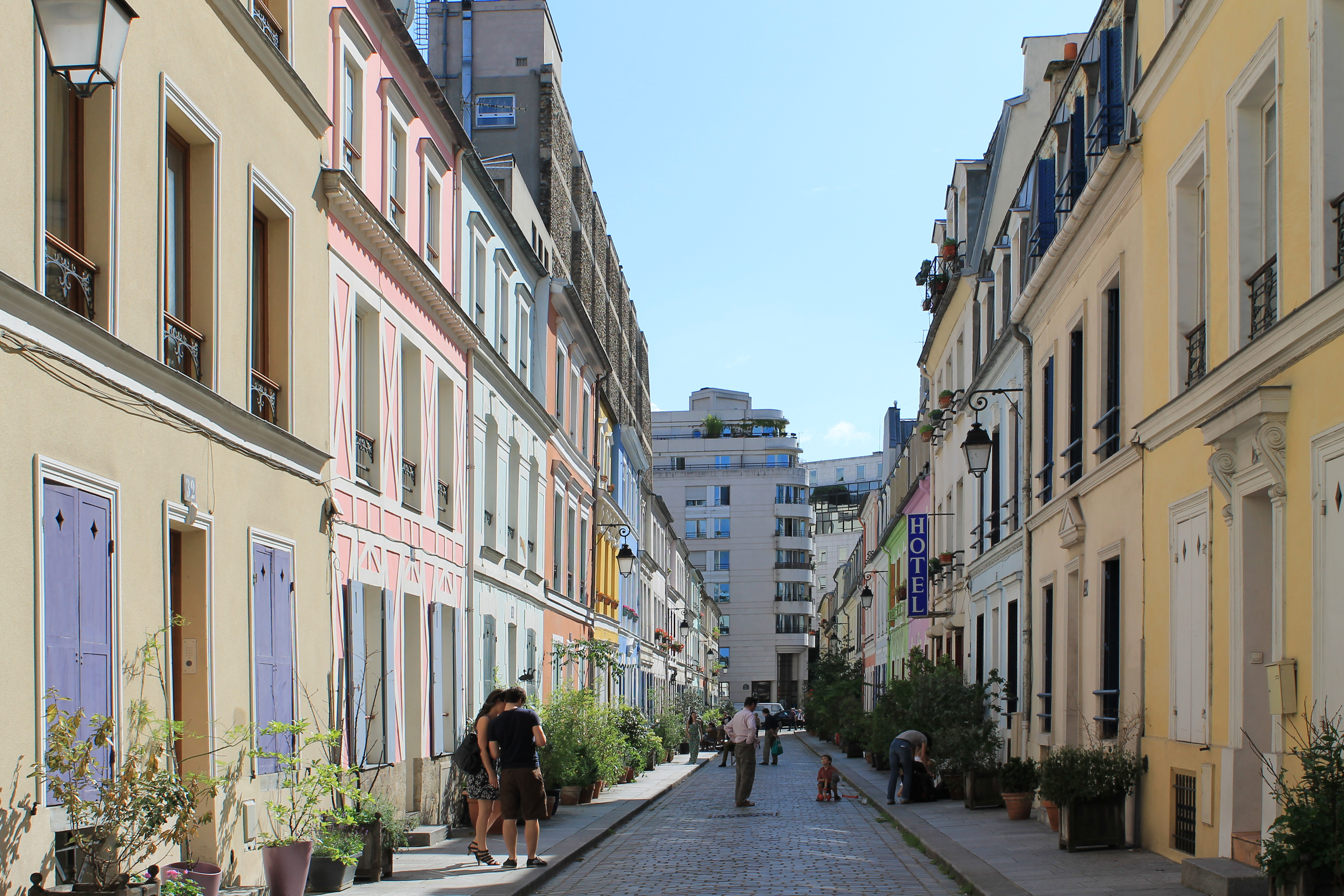
Rue Crémieux in 2012

The Rue Crémieux is a one-block pedestrian street in the 12th arrondissement of Paris, originally built as workers' housing. The street has been widely recommended to tourists for its quaint painted housefronts, and has become a popular destination for filming and for social media photos.

== History ==
The street was planned as the Millaud development in 1857, to provide housing for workers, and almost all the buildings were constructed at that time. It was known as the Rue Millaud from 1865 to 1898, when it was renamed after Adolphe Crémieux. During the 1910 Great Flood of Paris, the water from the Seine reached as high as 1.75 metres (5.7 ft) on one of the buildings. A commemorative plaque marks the location. The street was closed to vehicles in 1993.

== Appearance and popularity ==
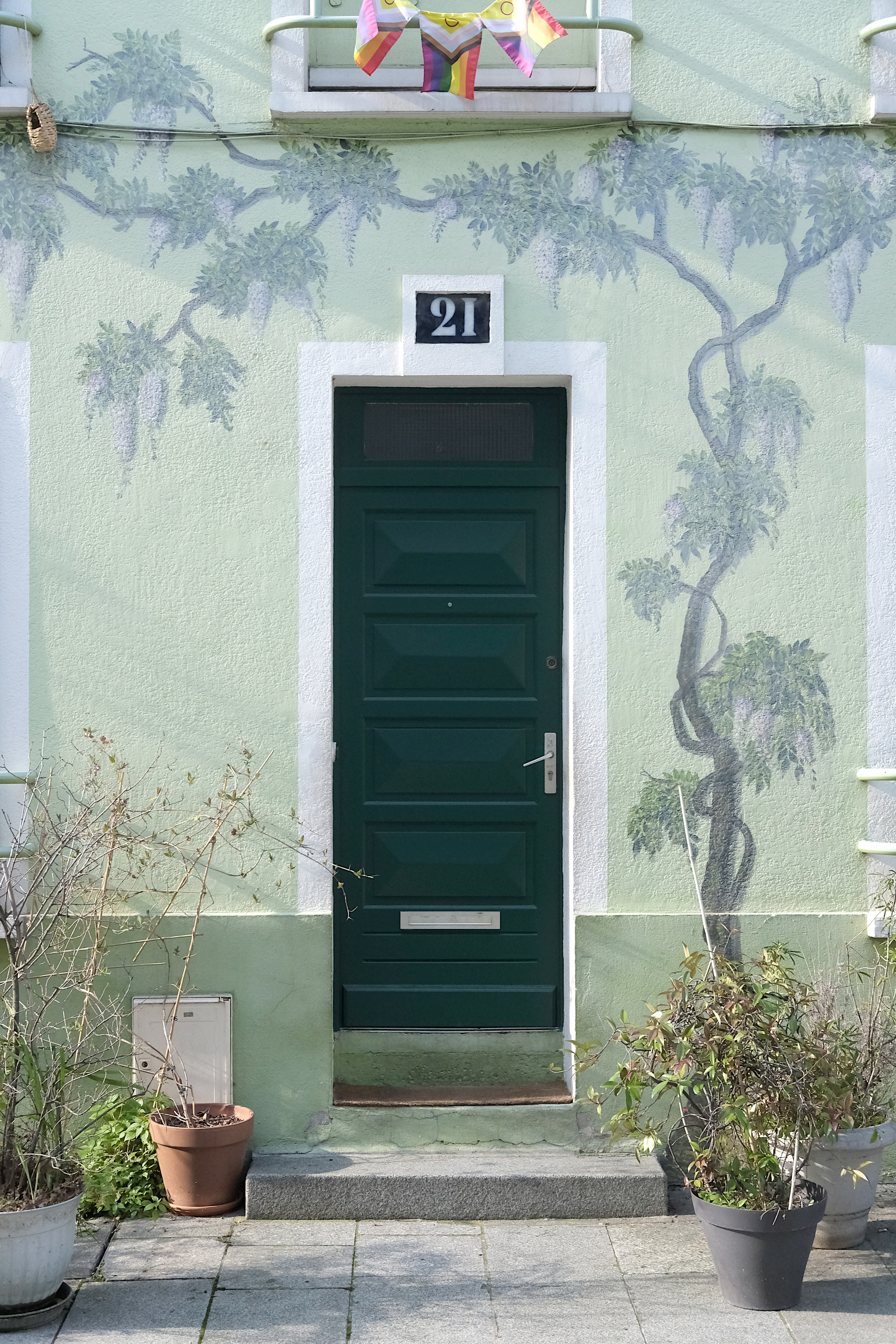
No. 21

The Rue Crémieux is 144 metres (472 ft) long, running between the Rue de Lyon and the Rue de Bercy, and cobbled, lined on both sides with relatively small terraced houses, on one side a little over one room deep. One houses an unmarked hostel, the Hôtel particulier. Most of the house-fronts are painted in pastel colours, described by one writer as "candy-hued", and some also have trompe-l'œil decoration, including lilac trained around an entrance and a cat stalking birds. It has been compared to Portobello Road in London and the Venetian island of Burano and widely recommended for tourist photos and used for fashion shoots.

The street's popularity for selfies, Instagram posts, and video shoots has come to annoy the residents, who have started an Instagram account of their own to depict those taking and posing for photos and asked the city council for a gate to close off the Rue Crémieux on weekends, in the evening, and at the golden hour.
