= Les Vallées de la Vanne =

- Commune
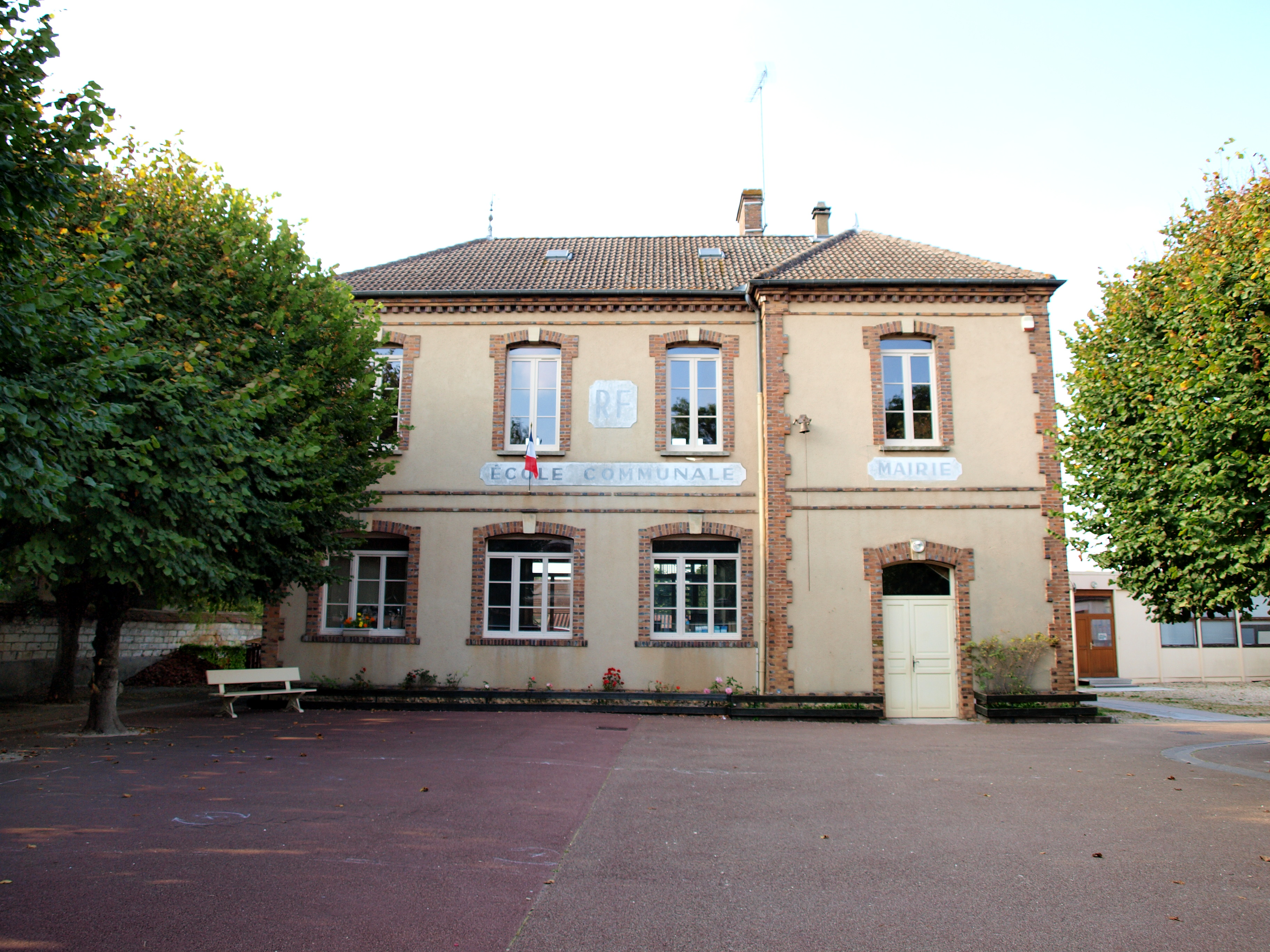
- The town hall in Theil-sur-Vanne
- Location of Les Vallées de la Vanne
- Location within France Location within Bourgogne-Franche-Comté
- Coordinates: 48°10′01″N 3°25′34″E
- Country: France
- Region: Bourgogne-Franche-Comté
- Department: Yonne
- Arrondissement: Sens
- Canton: Brienon-sur-Armançon

Government
  - Mayor (2020–2026): Luc Maudet
- Area^{1}: 33.72 km^{2} (13.02 sq mi)
- Population (2023): 1,021
  - Density: 30.28/km^{2} (78.42/sq mi)
- Time zone: UTC+01:00 (CET)
  - Summer (DST): UTC+02:00 (CEST)
- INSEE/Postal code: 89411 /89320, 89190
- ^{1} French Land Register data, which excludes lakes, ponds, glaciers > 1 km^{2} (0.386 sq mi or 247 acres) and river estuaries.

Les Vallées de la Vanne (French pronunciation: [le vale də la van], literally The Valleys of the Vanne) is a commune in the Yonne department of central France. The municipality was established on 1 January 2016 by merger of the former communes of Theil-sur-Vanne, Chigy and Vareilles.

== See also ==
- Communes of the Yonne department
