= Theil-sur-Vanne =

- Part of Les Vallées de la Vanne
- Location of Theil-sur-Vanne
- Location within France Location within Bourgogne-Franche-Comté
- Coordinates: 48°10′07″N 3°25′49″E
- Country: France
- Region: Bourgogne-Franche-Comté
- Department: Yonne
- Arrondissement: Sens
- Canton: Brienon-sur-Armançon
- Commune: Les Vallées de la Vanne
- Area^{1}: 11.55 km^{2} (4.46 sq mi)
- Elevation: 90 m (300 ft)
- Highest elevation: 222 m (728 ft)
- Lowest elevation: 86 m (282 ft)
- Population (2022): 444
  - Density: 38.4/km^{2} (99.6/sq mi)
- Time zone: UTC+01:00 (CET)
  - Summer (DST): UTC+02:00 (CEST)
- Postal code: 89320
- ^{1} French Land Register data, which excludes lakes, ponds, glaciers > 1 km^{2} (0.386 sq mi or 247 acres) and river estuaries.

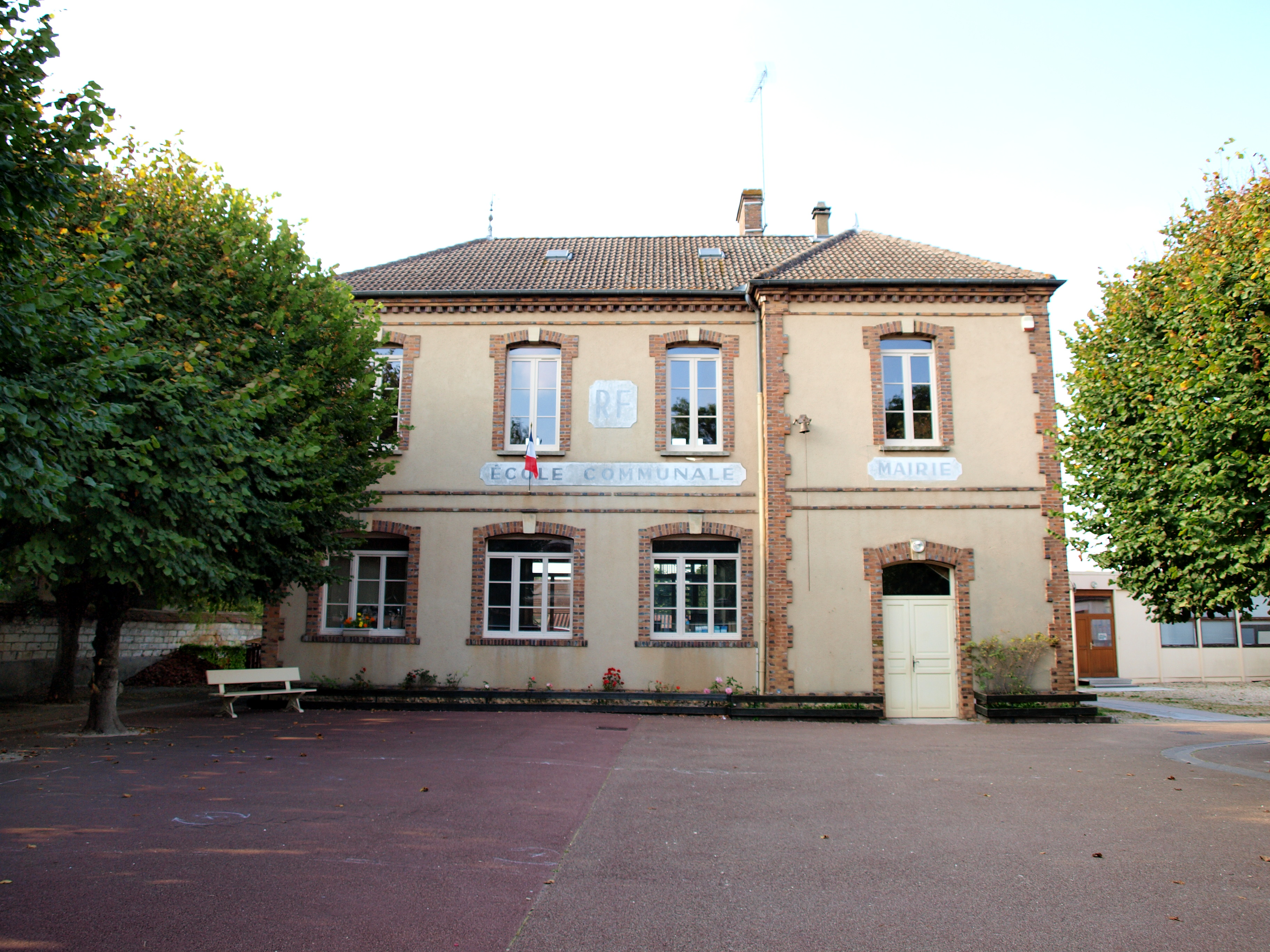
Theil-sur-Vanne

Theil-sur-Vanne (French pronunciation: [tɛj syʁ van], literally Theil on Vanne) is a former commune in the Yonne department in Bourgogne-Franche-Comté in north-central France. On 1 January 2016, it was merged into the new commune of Les Vallées de la Vanne.

== See also ==
- Communes of the Yonne department
