= Hugues Aubriot =

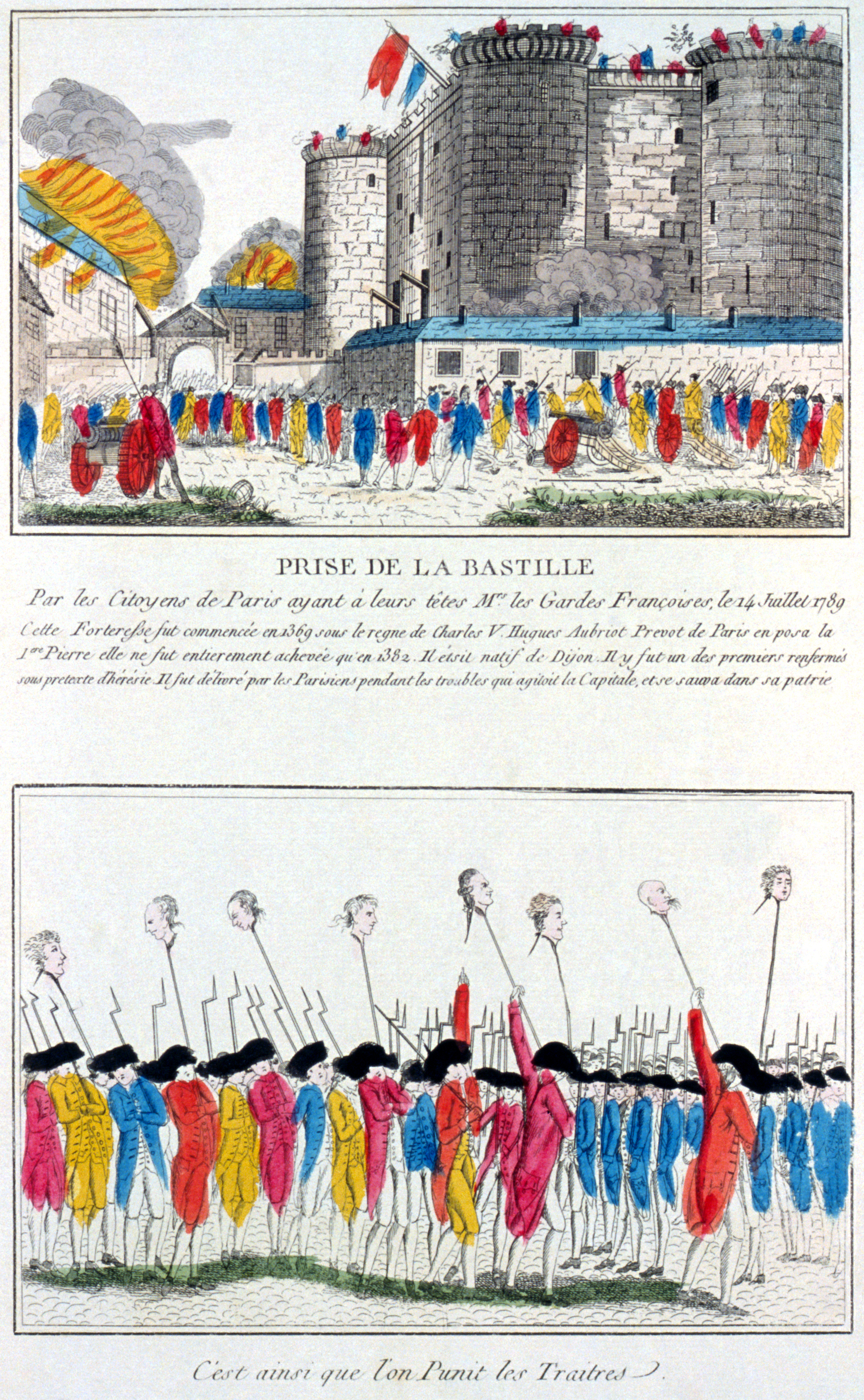
According to the caption of this picture, Aubriot became one of the first prisoners at Bastille under the pretext of heresy.

Hugues Aubriot (born 1300s in Dijon; died c. 1391 in Dijon) was a French administrator and heretic. Aubriot was Provost of Paris under Charles V. He built the Bastille in 1370–1383. He was a capable administrator who built the first sewers in Paris, and strengthened the city's fortifications. He was on very poor terms with both the Church, and the University of Paris, which was dominated by the Clergy. During the course of disturbances, in Paris, after the death of Charles V in 1380, he arrested citizens who had harassed the city's Jews. For this, he was placed on trial, and a variety of trumped-up charges were brought against him, including heresy, sodomy, and extortion. However, he was a strong supporter of Philip the Bold, Duke of Burgundy, who was able to prevent him from being executed. He was instead sentenced to life imprisonment on bread and water. In subsequent disturbances in Paris, he was released by a mob who were rioting against excessive taxation and sought his support. Prudently, he took the opportunity to flee Paris after that.

== See also ==
- Paris Sewer Museum
