= Paris Sewer Museum =

History museum in Paris, France

- Musée des Égouts de Paris
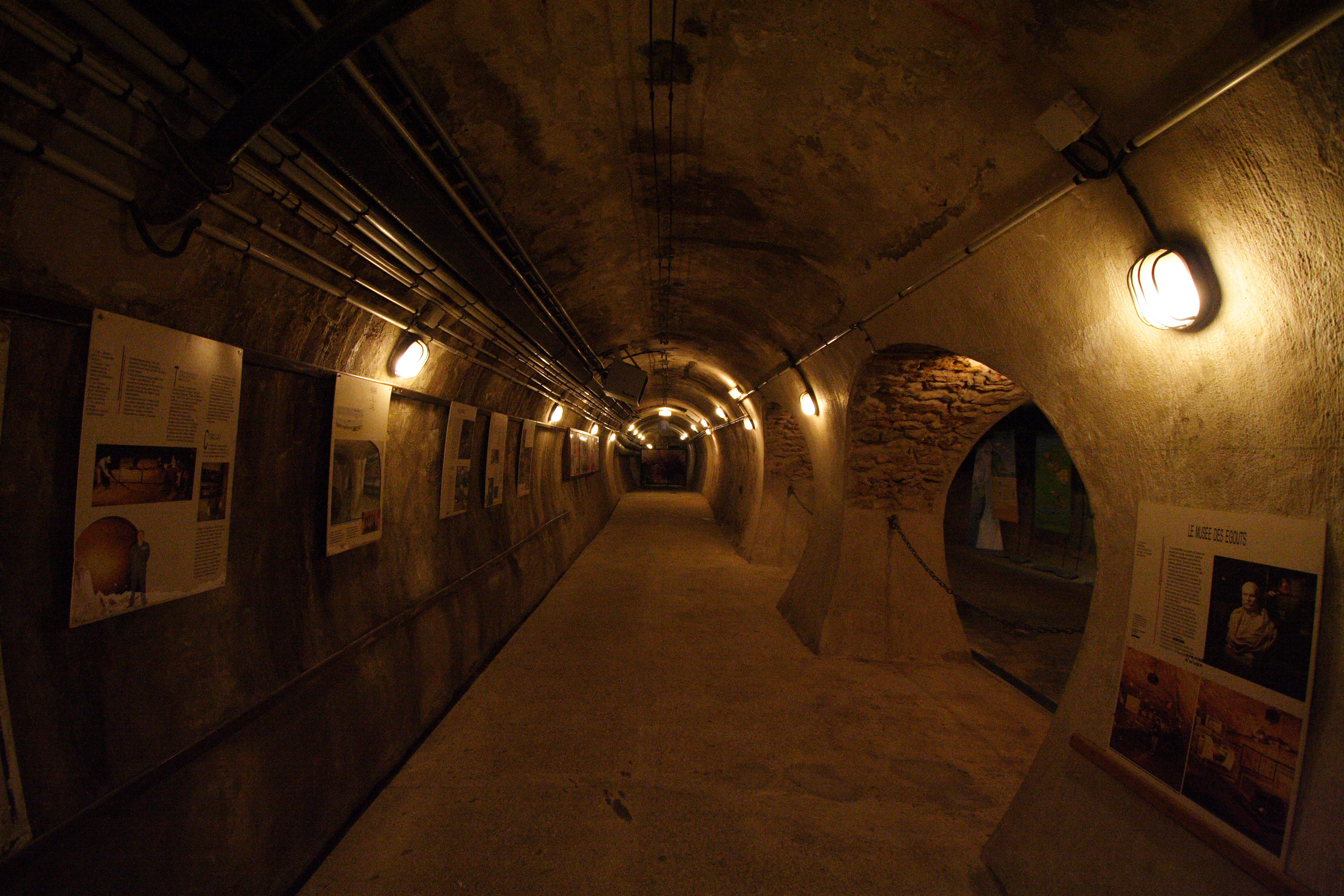
- Inside the Paris Sewer Museum
- Location: Pont de l'Alma, 7th arrondissement, Paris, France
- Coordinates: 48.862642°N 2.302235°E
- Type: History museum
- Website: musee-egouts.paris.fr/en/

The Paris Sewer Museum (French: Musée des Égouts de Paris), is a museum located in the sewers at the esplanade Habib-Bourguiba, near the pont de l'Alma, in the 7th arrondissement of Paris, France. Since October 2021, the museum has been accessible every day except Monday.

== History and description ==
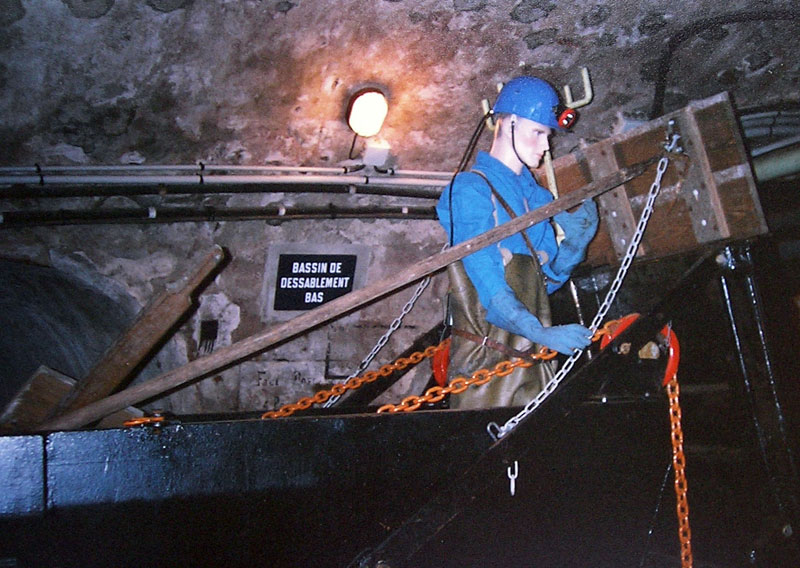
Sewer worker mannequin in the museum tunnel

Organized tours of the sewers were first offered in 1889. Tours were available twice monthly, and visitors were transported through the sewers on boats and wagons.

The museum details the history of the sewers from their initial development by Hugues Aubriot, provost of Paris in the late 14th century, to their modern structure, which was designed in the 19th century by the engineer Eugène Belgrand. The museum also provides information about the role of sewer workers and methods of water treatment.

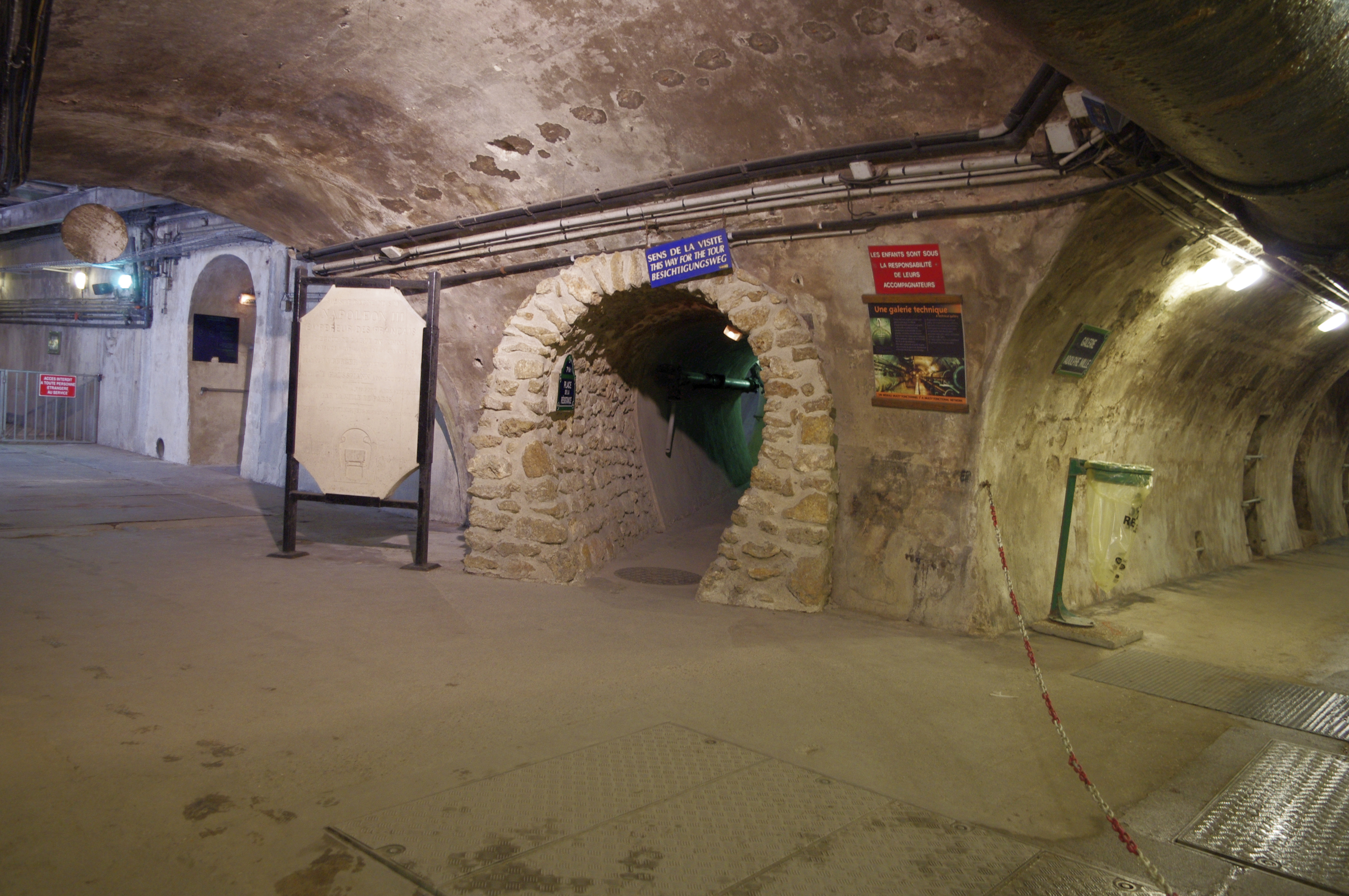
Entrance.

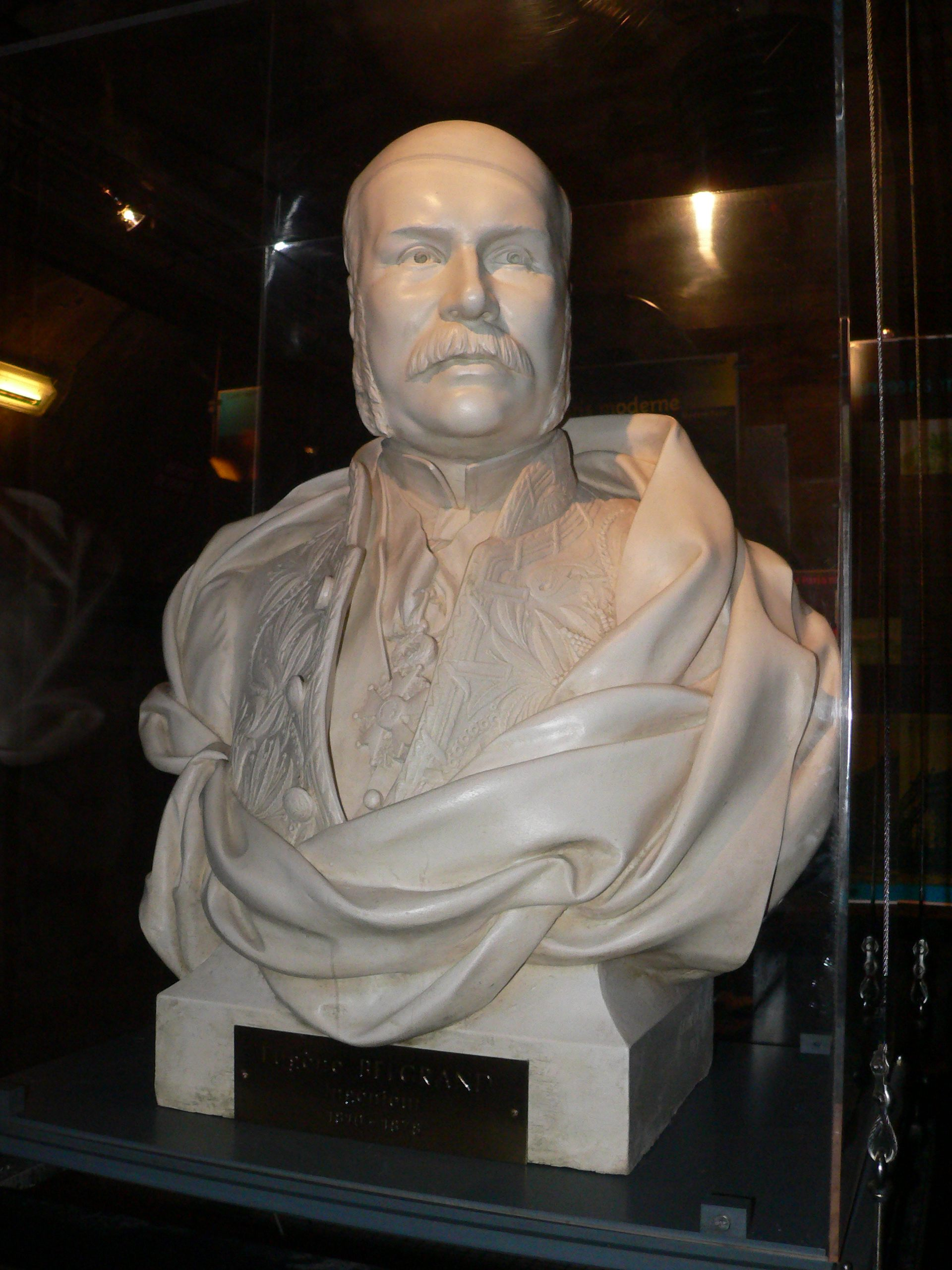
Bust of Eugène Belgrand.

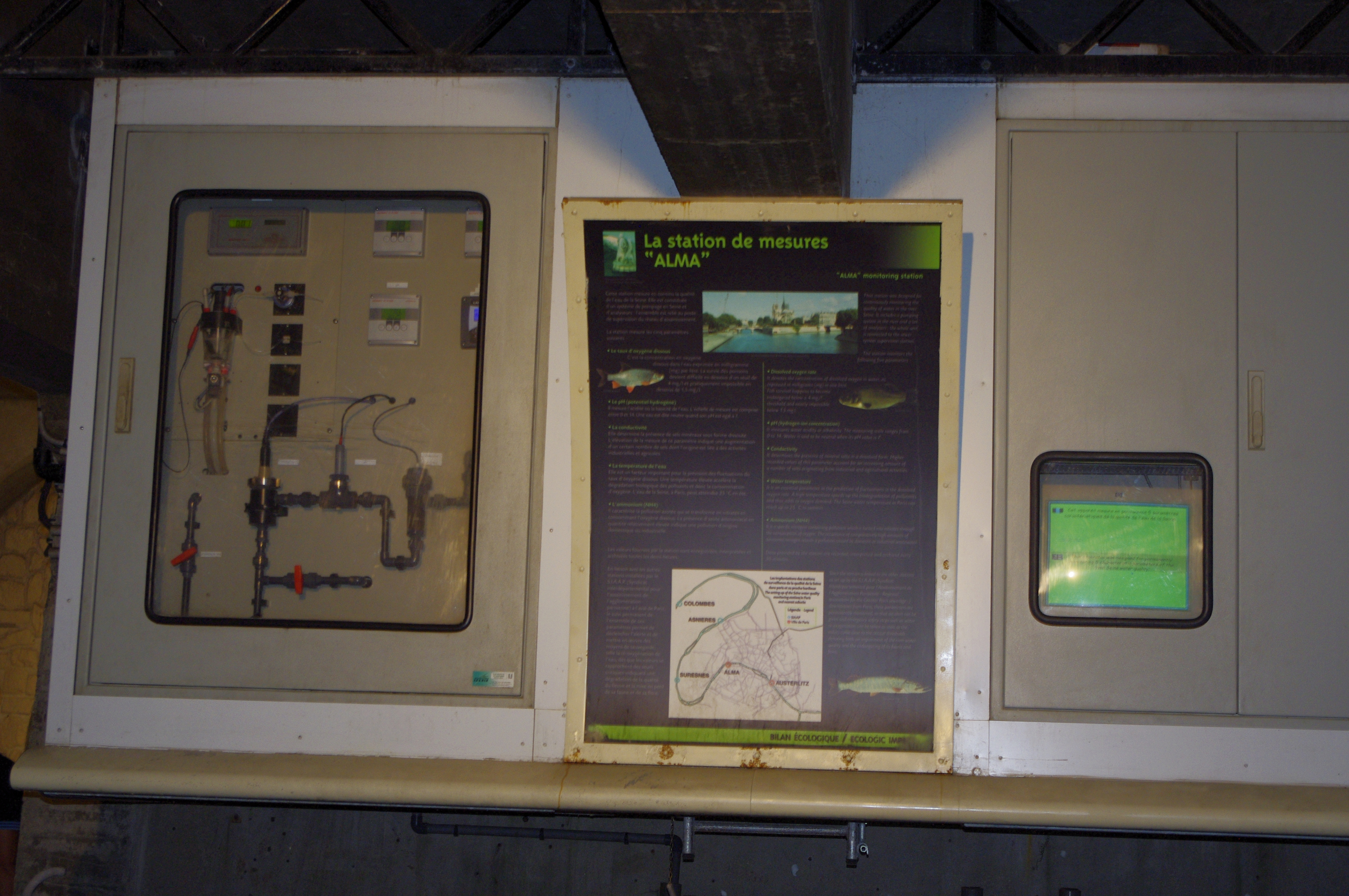
Alma measurements station.

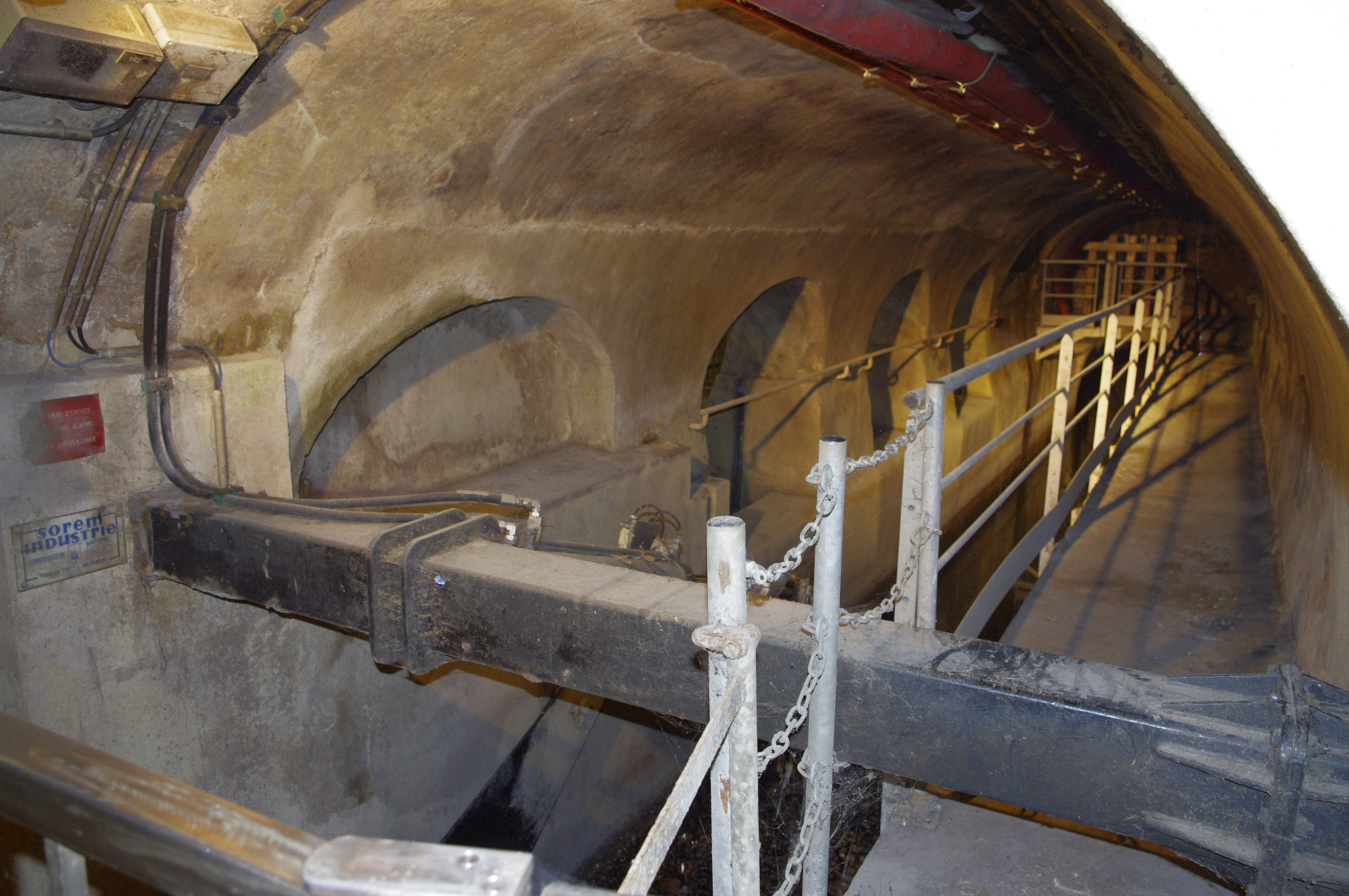
Spillway of Orgae Alma.

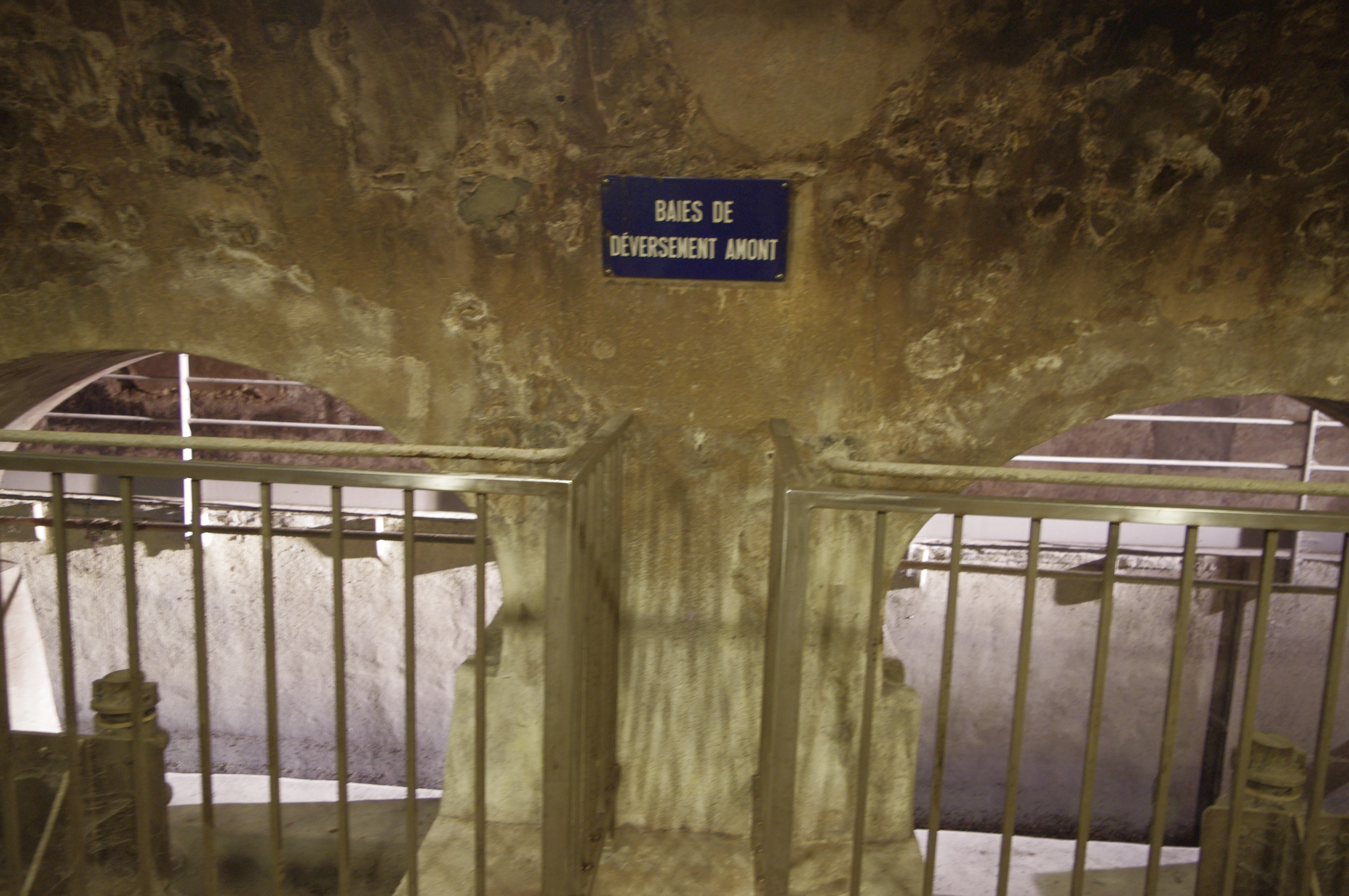
Spillway doors.

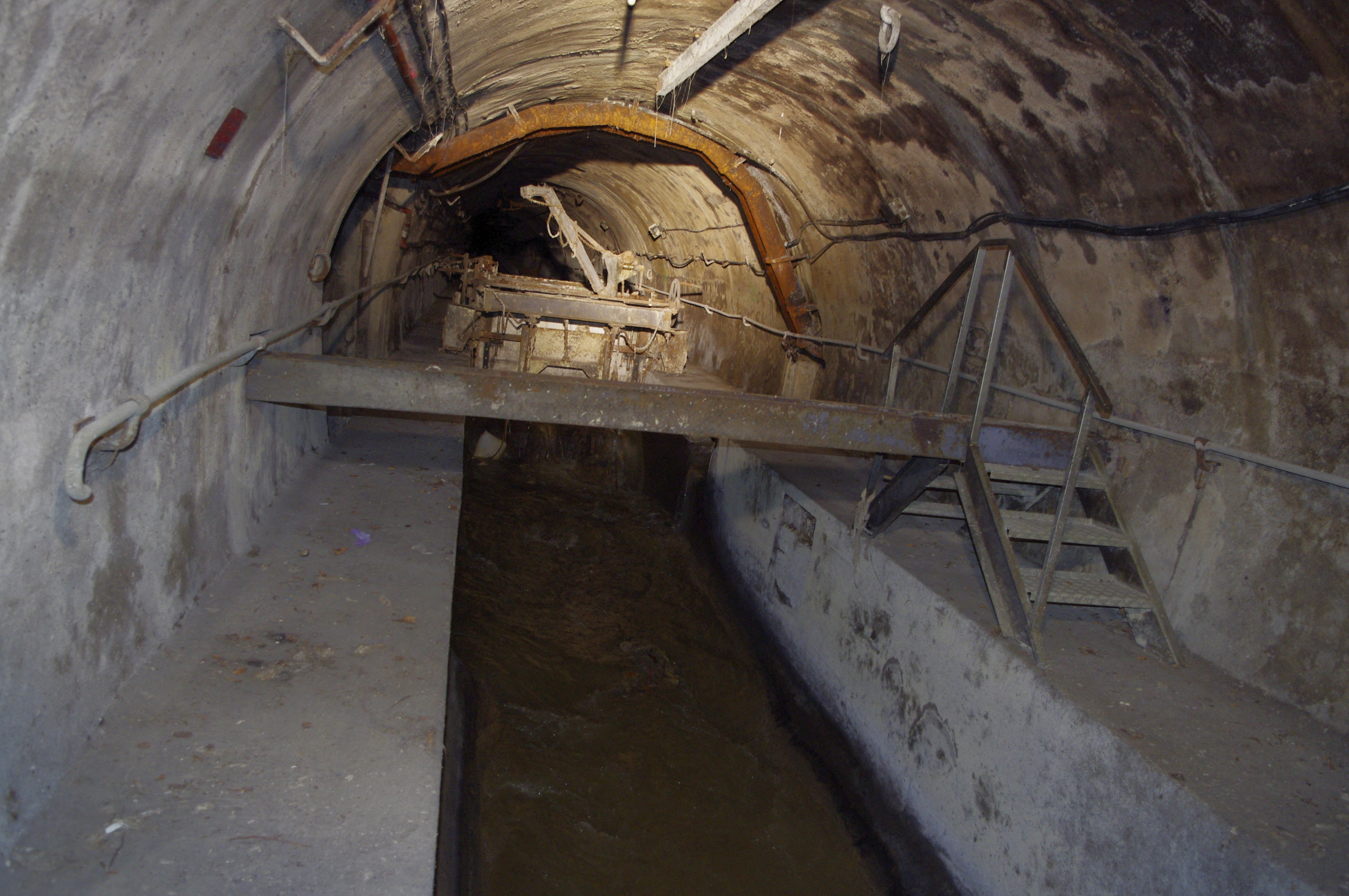
Bi-bowl wagon.

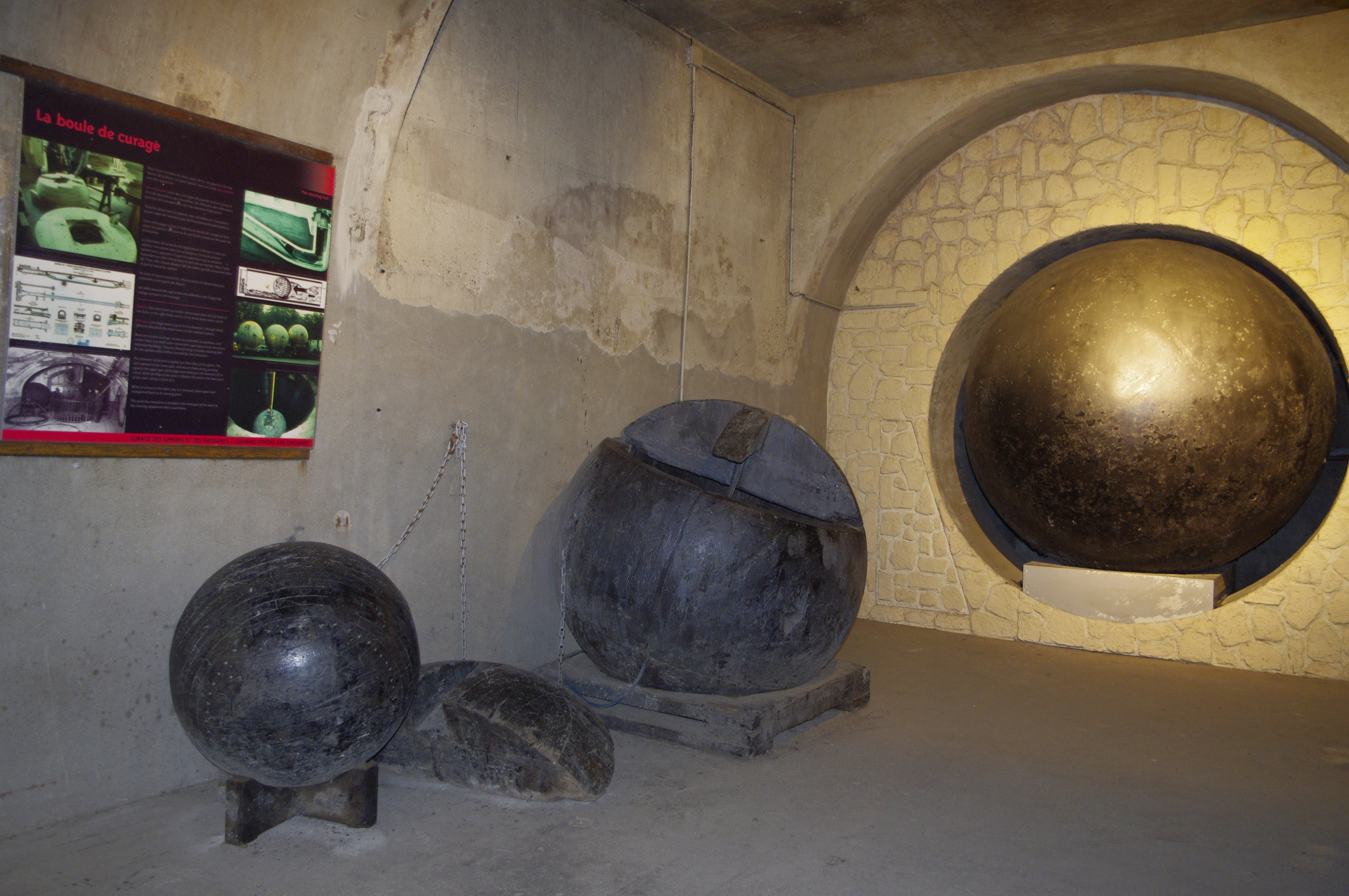
Dredging bowls.

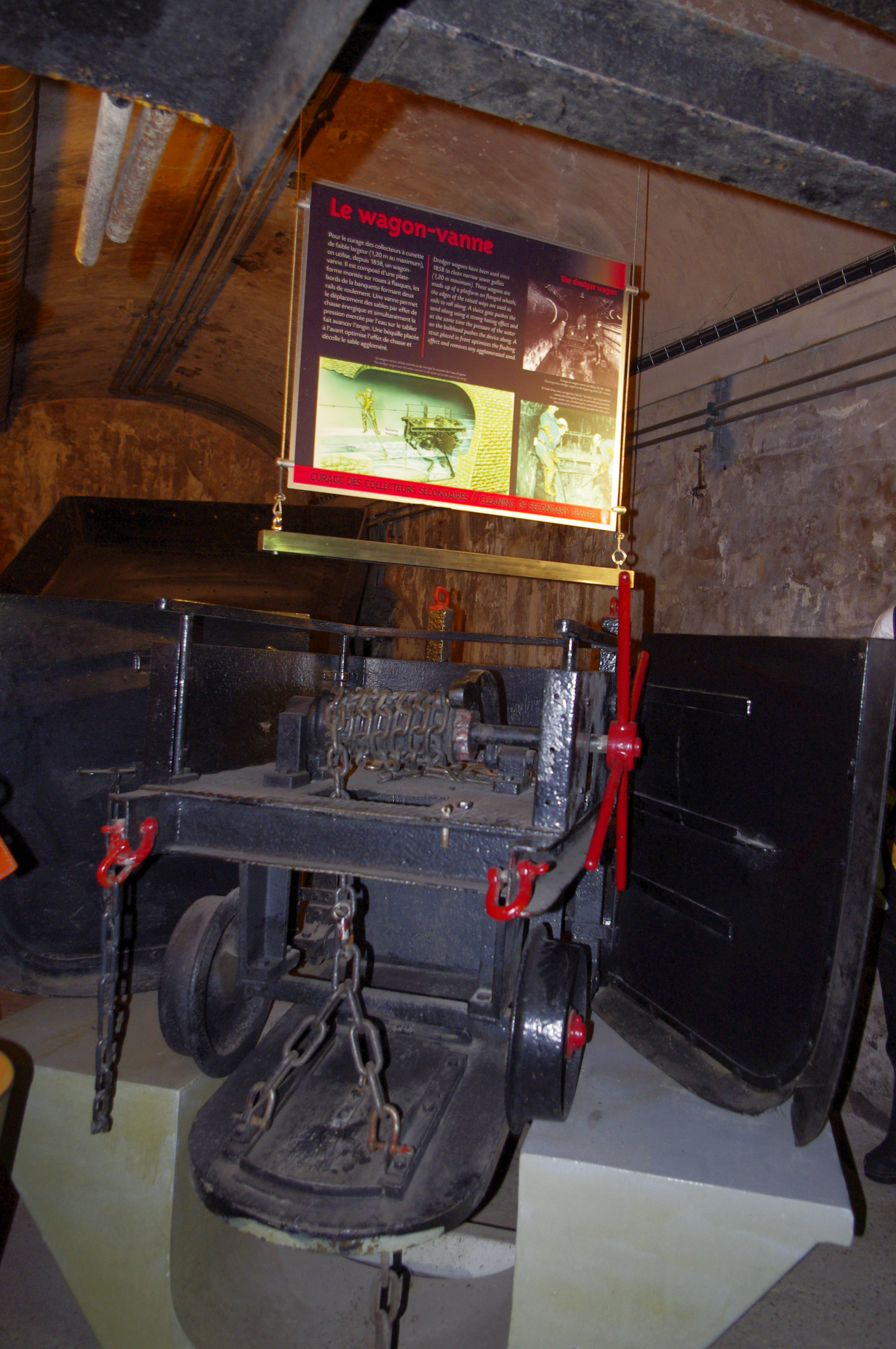
Valve wagon.

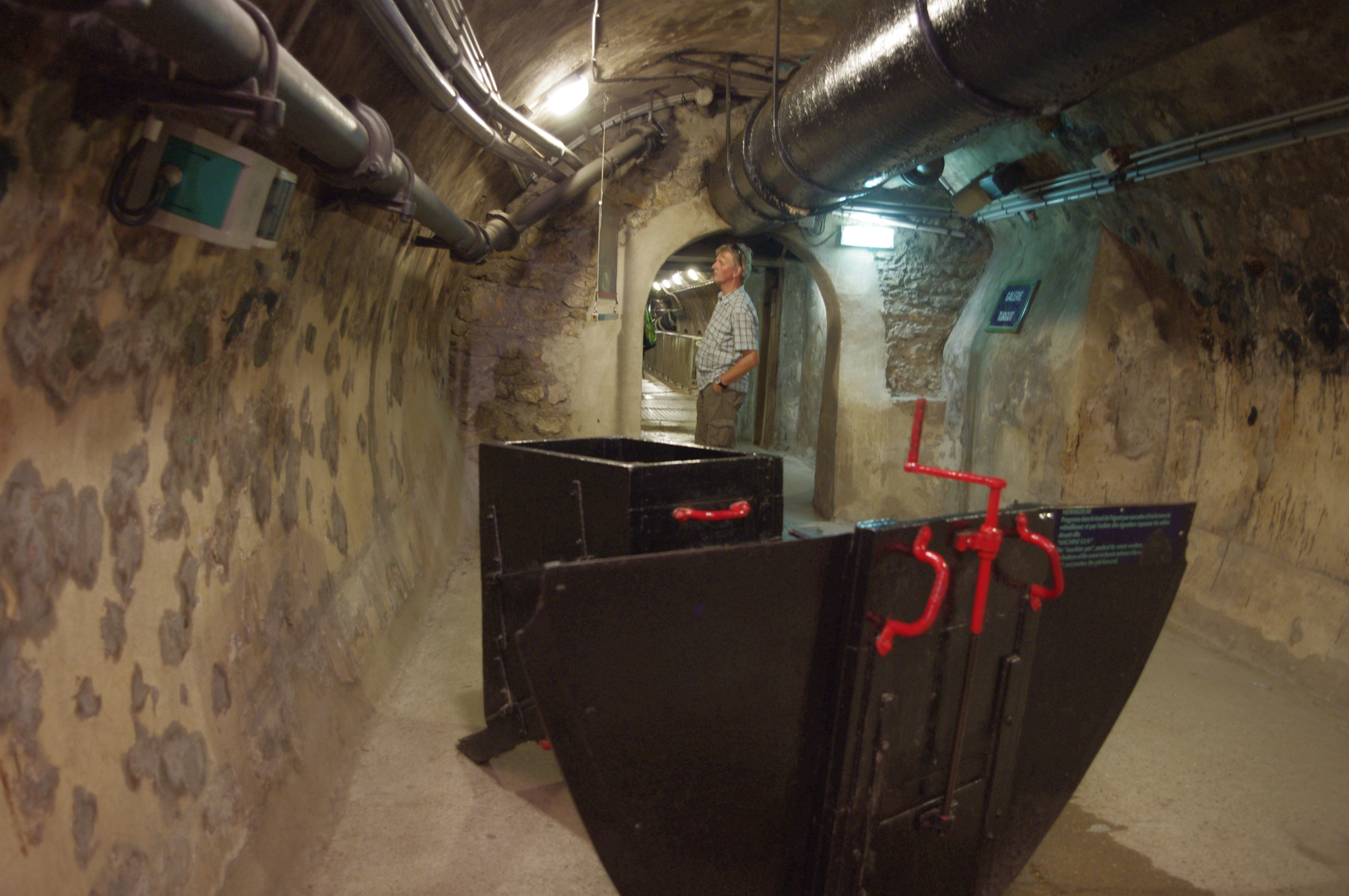
Mitrailleuse KP.

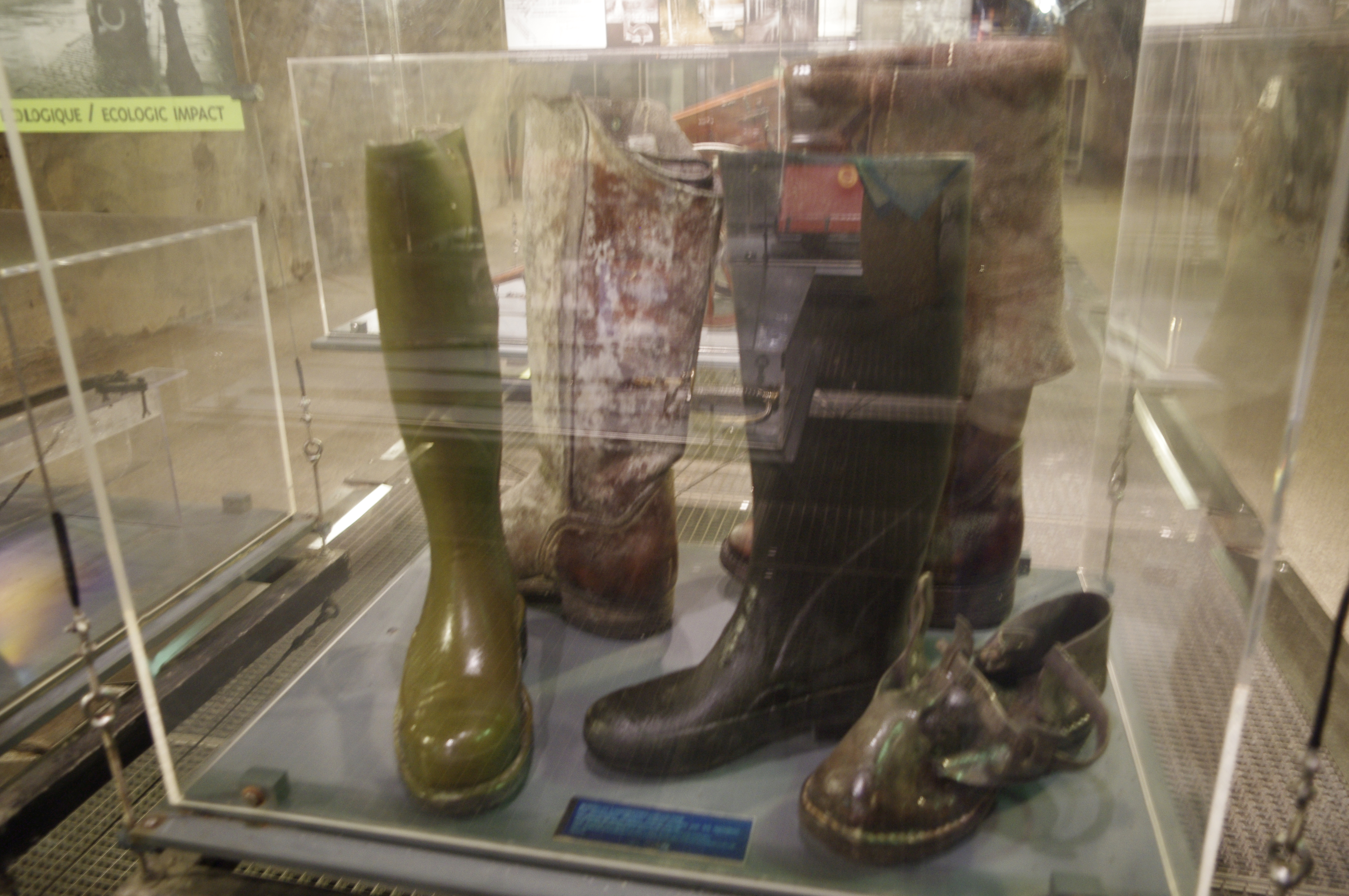
Boots display.

== Location ==
The museum is accessible by metro on line 9 at Alma-Marceau station, by RER train line C at Pont de l'Alma station, and by bus lines 63 and 80 at the Alma-Marceau stop.

== See also ==
- List of museums in Paris
- Paris sewers
