= Vareilles, Yonne =

Vareilles
- Part of Les Vallées de la Vanne
- Location of Vareilles
- Location within France Location within Bourgogne-Franche-Comté
- Coordinates: 48°10′32″N 3°28′21″E
- Country: France
- Region: Bourgogne-Franche-Comté
- Department: Yonne
- Arrondissement: Sens
- Canton: Brienon-sur-Armançon
- Commune: Les Vallées de la Vanne
- Area^{1}: 10.41 km^{2} (4.02 sq mi)
- Highest elevation: 218 m (715 ft)
- Lowest elevation: 91 m (299 ft)
- Population (2022): 232
  - Density: 22.3/km^{2} (57.7/sq mi)
- Time zone: UTC+01:00 (CET)
  - Summer (DST): UTC+02:00 (CEST)
- Postal code: 89320
- ^{1} French Land Register data, which excludes lakes, ponds, glaciers > 1 km^{2} (0.386 sq mi or 247 acres) and river estuaries.

Vareilles (French pronunciation: [vaʁɛj]) is a former commune in the Yonne department in Bourgogne-Franche-Comté in north-central France. On 1 January 2016, it was merged into the new commune of Les Vallées de la Vanne.

== See also ==
- Communes of the Yonne department
