= Patrice Vareilles =

French footballer (born 1978)

Personal information
- Date of birth: 29 November 1978 (age 47)
- Place of birth: Aurillac, France
- Height: 1.79 m (5 ft 10 1/2 in)
- Position: Striker

Team information
- Current team: Étoile Fréjus Saint-Raphaël

Senior career*
Years	Team	Apps	(Gls)
1996–2004	Aurillac FCA	156	(61)
2004–2006	Aviron Bayonnais	72	(29)
2006–2009	US Créteil-Lusitanos	72	(23)
2009–2010	AS Moulins	21	(6)
2010	Étoile Fréjus Saint-Raphaël	-	
- * Club domestic league appearances and goals as of 27 March 2011

Patrice Vareilles (born 29 November 1978) is a French professional football player. Currently, he plays in the Championnat National for Fréjus.

He played on the professional level in Ligue 2 for US Créteil-Lusitanos.
