= Paris sewers =

Sewerage system of Paris, France

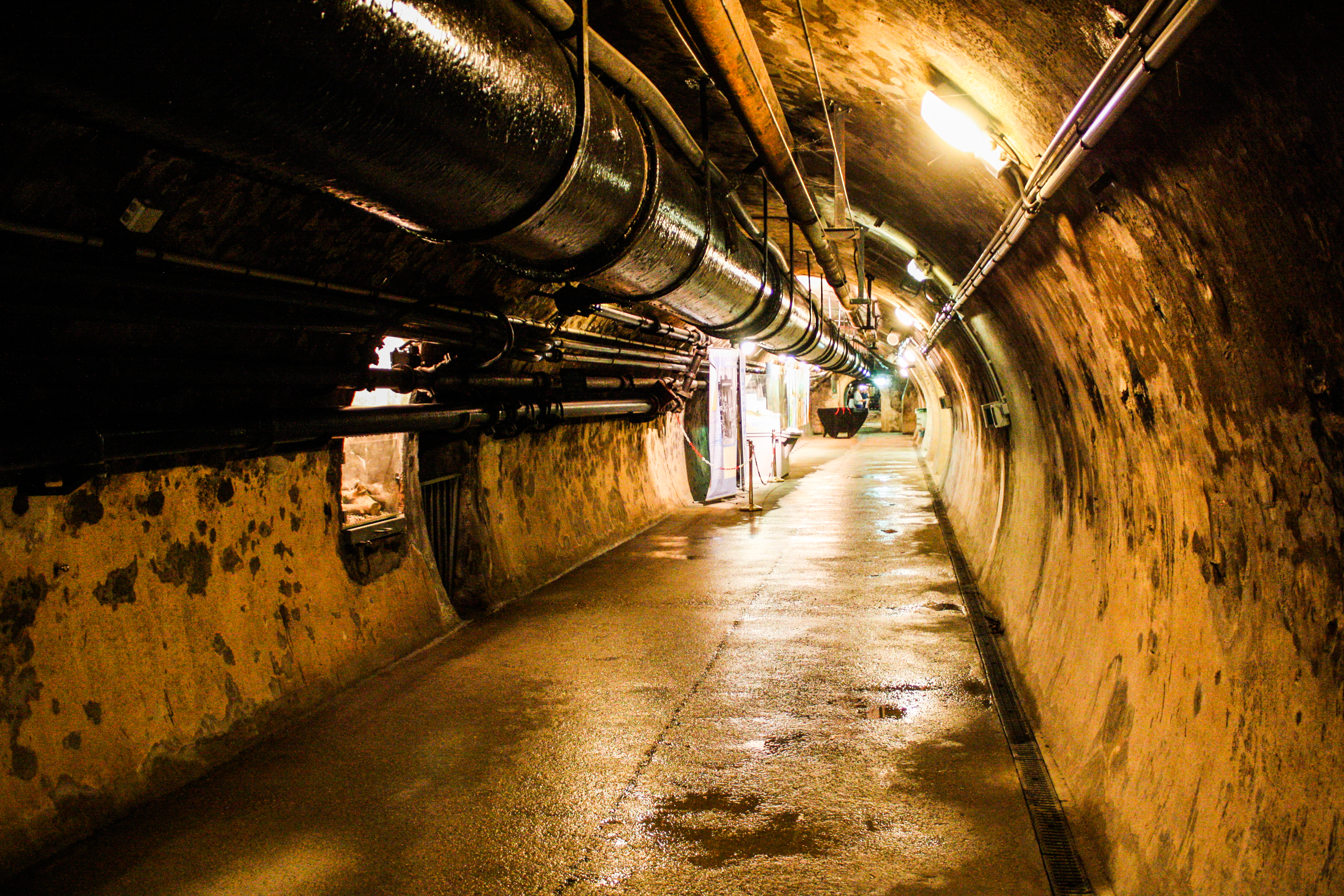
Paris sewers, 2013

Although the Romans built a small number of sewer lines on the Left Bank, the development of the sewers of Paris dates back to the year 1370, when the first underground system was built under Rue Montmartre. Consecutive French governments enlarged the system to cover the city's population, including modernization and expansions under Louis XIV and Napoleon III. These were followed by modernisation programs in the 1990s under Mayor Jacques Chirac. Paris's sewer system has featured in popular culture throughout its existence, including Victor Hugo's 1862 novel, Les Misérables, and H. L. Humes's 1958 novel The Underground City.

== Hydrological context ==
The hydrological context in which Parisians developed their sewer system over the centuries is complex. The ancient system of waterways of the Seine and of local springs resulted in a challenging situation in terms of water volume and circulation (or, more often, water stagnation).

From the Mesolithic period until the Middle Ages, a secondary branch of the Seine cut an uneven semicircle to the north of Paris, starting from what is now the Bercy neighborhood of the eastern 12th arrondissement, then passing approximately through the current Place de la Bastille and the Place de la République, then through the Saint-Lazare train station, before finally joining the main course of the Seine at roughly the site of what is now the Pont de l'Alma (the Alma Bridge).

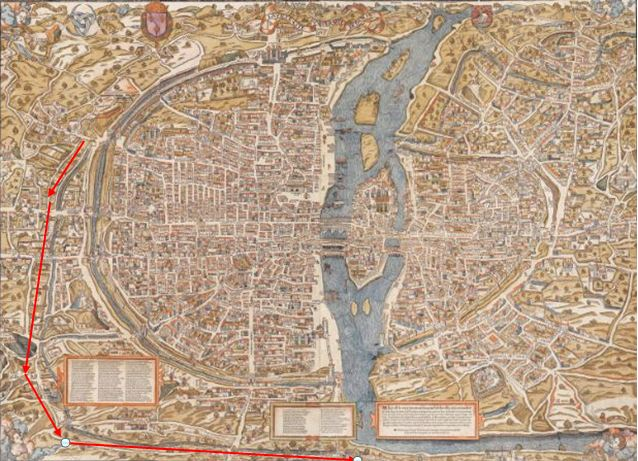
The Ménilmontant stream, superimposed in red on the Paris map created by Truschet and Hoyau, 1550

Though silt and human activity eventually filled in this secondary branch, it nevertheless formed a marshy depression in the northern part of Paris that received runoff from the hills of Belleville, Montmartre, and Roule. This runoff and the numerous natural water sources in the area fed a stream called the Menilmontant brook, which followed the course of the ancient river. This stream rose at the foot of the Ménilmontant hill before emptying into the Seine at current location of the Pont de l’ Alma.

Besides the multitude of watercourses and springs in Paris, the city's topography posed another problem: its lack of slope. With the exception of its south-southeast sector on the southern bank of the Seine, the Parisian landscape at that time ranged from 32 to 40 meters in altitude. This relatively flat topography, combined with the long distances that the sewers had to travel, "made the average slope imperceptible", which greatly complicated the gravity flow of wastewater and explained the structural difficulties encountered when setting up the first sewer systems.

It is presumably because of the abundant supply of water and the flat terrain that the Romans assigned the name of Lutetia — meaning, according to some translations, ‘city of mud’ — to the Gallo-Roman city that preceded Paris.

== History ==
=== Gallo-Roman period ===
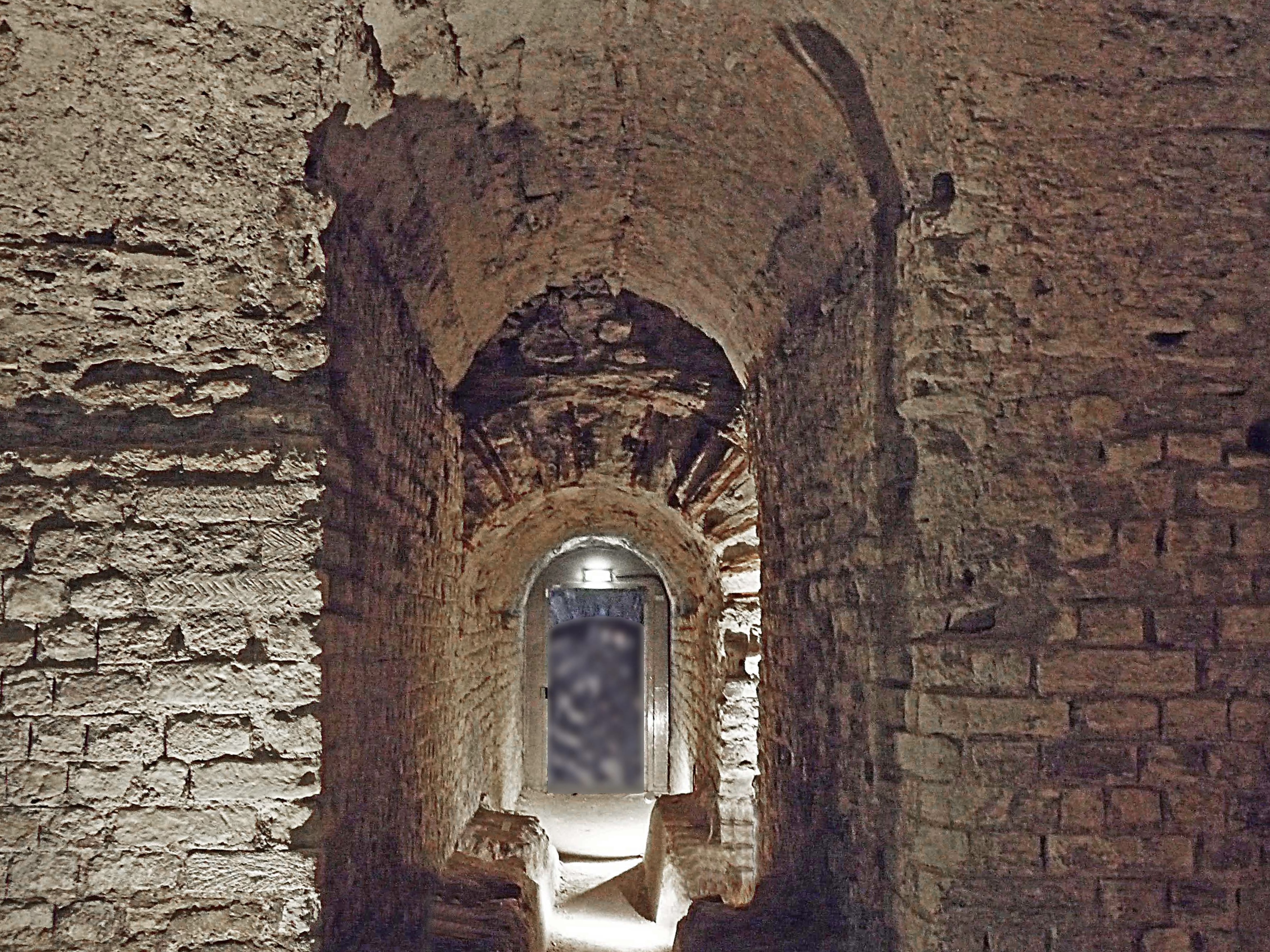
Northern section of the main Roman sewer line

The urban plan of Gallo-Roman city of Lutetia was largely dictated by the need to avoid the swampy terrain that characterized most of the area. Specifically, Lutetia was spread across two separate locations. The first was a raised area of buildable land on the southern bank of the Seine. This part of the city featured the prestigious buildings typical of Gallo-Roman cities (theaters, arenas, baths, villas, etc.). The second location — for more humble buildings — was on the five islands of the Seine that were later consolidated into the two islands of Île de la Cité and Île Saint-Louis. In between the two locations was swampland.

Among other structures, the Romans built systems for supplying and managing drinking and waste water. These included the first sewers in Paris, which connected the Cluny baths on the Rive gauche to the Seine. This small sewage system was underground, solidly built with masonry and was also used to evacuate rain water from the bathing complex. It was designed with elevated paths and high ceilings that facilitated maintenance.

Vestiges of these sewers were discovered under the Cluny baths during the construction of Boulevard Saint-Michel in the 1850s. This is the only Gallo-Roman sewer line in Paris that has been discovered to date, meaning that the sewer system was probably not readily available to a large percentage of the city's population. If other Roman cities’ sanitation systems provide insights into Lutetia inhabitants’ practices, then it is likely that many households simply emptied chamber pots into gardens, streets or waterways.

=== Middle Ages ===
During the Middle Ages, Lutetia's covered sewers gave way to open channels which were often poorly designed and poorly built and maintained. Around 1200, Phillipe Auguste had many of the Parisian streets paved, incorporating an open drain for wastewater in their middle. In 1370 Hugues Aubriot, a Parisian provost, had an underground vaulted, stone-walled sewer built in the "rue Montmartre". This sewer — the first walled and vaulted sewer in medieval Paris — collected wastewater and took it to the "Menilmontant brook", which also served as the grand égout (the big sewer surrounding right bank Paris). Because Aubriot's sewer design did not provide space for maintenance workers, it was frequently blocked and suffered from collapsed masonry. The grand égout was the main sewage collector on the Right Bank of the Seine while the Bièvre river was the main collector on the Left Bank.

These rudimentary sewage systems could not handle the waste generated by the Parisian population. Household wastewater was poured onto gardens and fields as fertilizer or on unpaved streets. Horse manure was omnipresent. Though it was illegal, merchants used the channels as dumps — butchers often disposed of animal carcasses in the sewers, which clogged them.

All of this led to pervasive unpleasant odors in the urban environment, to which most Parisians at the time were accustomed. However, for some, the smell problem became intolerable. Louis XII and Francois I, both of whom lived in the palace of Tournelles in the Marais district of Paris, complained about the odors emanating from the beltway sewer, which passed near their palace. Francois I was so disgusted that he bought the land where the Tuileries were later developed in order to help his family escape the odors.

=== Ancien Régime ===
For most of this period, human waste removal was accomplished by means of sewers or by physical removal by specialised services. For the latter method, human waste was removed by street cleaners who were responsible for cleaning out what was thrown into the middle of the streets and by private services that emptied the pits that were dug in individual houses. This organic matter was delivered to dumps where, for a time, it was mixed with other detritus generated by the city's inhabitants. In 1674, the city government ordered that the two types of detritus should be separated into different waste facilities. In 1758, a decree ordered that all dumps must be moved outside the city walls, with the main city dump being ultimately consolidated in Montfaucon, at the base of what is now Butte-Chaumont. In addition to this method, a mix of public and private or semi-private sewers existed. Under this system, the responsibility for building and maintaining sewers was not clearly defined, and private people sometimes took it upon themselves to clean and repair existing 'public' sewers.

During the 1700s, some clarification of responsibility for sewer construction and maintenance was made. The municipality assumed responsibility for building and maintaining sewers by paying external service providers to do the work. In 1721, the city government required that citizens must pay to clean sewers serving their houses. In 1736, it declared that any citizen caught dumping garbage into the sewers would have to pay a considerable fine and servants caught doing so would be subject to corporal punishment.

Some sewage construction also occurred during the 1700s. The royal family – the Regent and the young Louis XV – decided that they wished to take up residence in Paris and wanted to develop a new quartier to house the royal entourage. However, the chosen site was subject to the overpowering odours of the old beltway sewer. In order to solve this problem, work began in 1737 on a sewer that would ultimately incorporate several innovations (relative to other Parisian sewers). The Provost Michel-Étienne Turgot oversaw the construction of a new sewer that contained, at its head, a reservoir of water that was used to provide a reliable source of water for flushing out the sewer as well as a series of valves that could be used to release water in a distributed manner for sewer cleaning and for fighting fires. At the completion of the new sewer in 1740, Louis XV – showing an unprecedented interest in such matters by a member of the royal family – attended the inaugural flushing of the sewer.

Despite its relatively advanced design, Turgot's sewer did not survive for long. The municipality accorded private parties the right to build over the sewer line as long as they covered it with a vaulted ceiling made of masonry. Furthermore, each individual owner had to have its section of the sewer cleaned by a service provider certified by the municipality. This did not work in a satisfactory manner. The situation was aggravated by illegal connections to the sewer and by the dumping other sorts of waste. Soon the sewer was completely blocked and was abandoned shortly after Turgot's death in 1751. The land upon which the reservoir for flushing was built was sold in 1779.

=== French Revolution and the 19th century ===
Prior to 1850, the water management system in Paris was inadequate for its growing population. Waste water was discharged into the Seine, a primary source of the critically limited supply of drinking water. A cholera epidemic in 1832 carried off more than 18,000 Parisians out of a population of 800,000 and focused the public authorities’ attention on hygiene. At the time, the bacterial cause of the disease was unknown and it was thought to be caused by noxious odors — hence, the renewed interest in building sewers.

Napoleon had several sewers built. During the Bourbon Restauration (1815–1830) some useful innovations were made. Notably, sewers in Paris began to be built with millstone grit walls and the channels in which the sewage flowed had rounded bottoms to facilitate faster movement of water and more efficient cleaning. In earlier periods, sewers were built with cut stone (pierre de taille) and had rectangular bottoms.

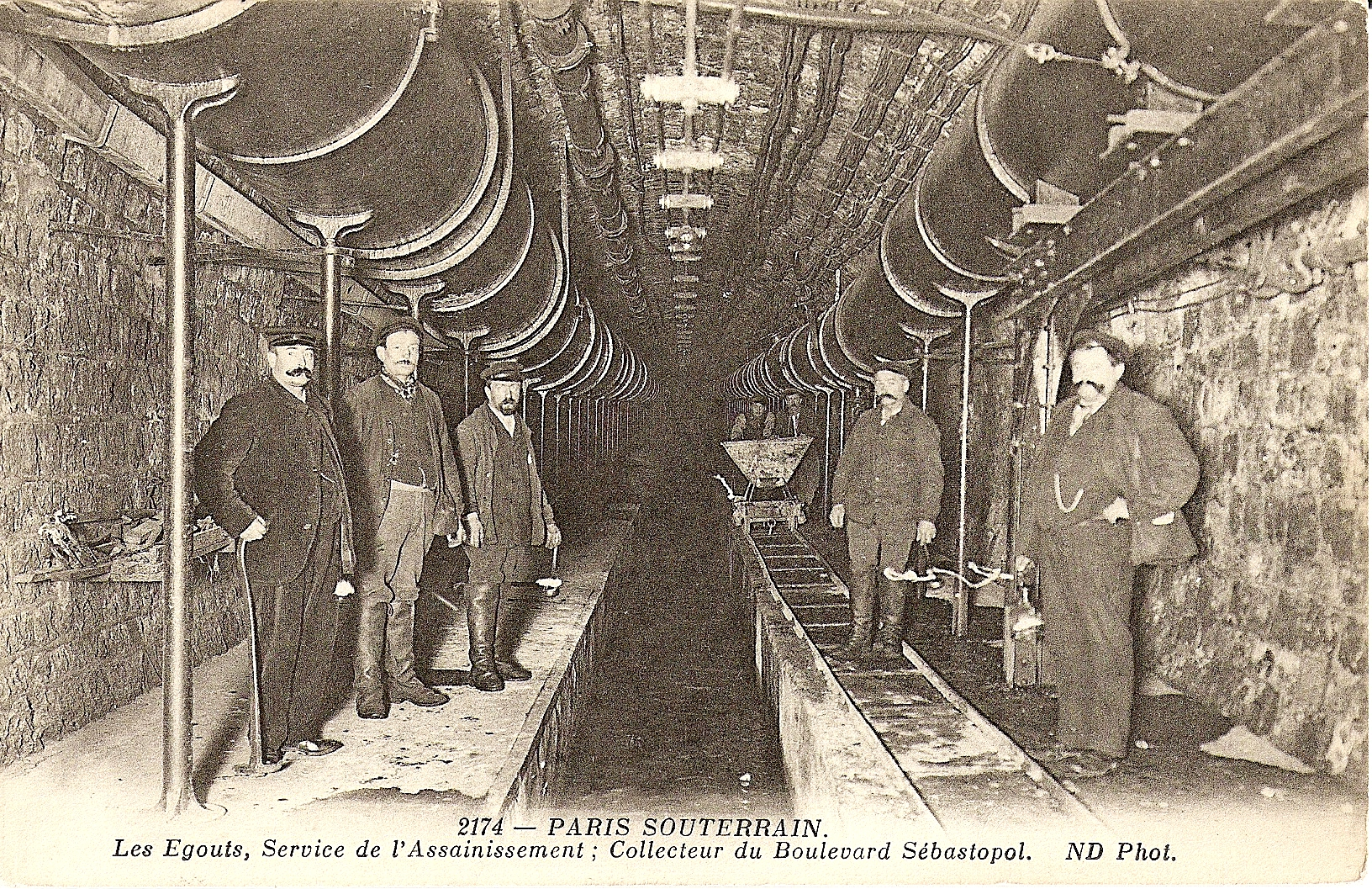
The sewage collector on Boulevard de Sébastopol at the beginning of the 20th century. The large pipes are for drinking water. The design and imposing size of these sewers facilitated on-site maintenance.

Baron Haussmann, who was tasked by Napoléon III to modernize the city, appointed Eugène Belgrand as Director of Water and Sewers of Paris in March 1855. Belgrand embarked on an ambitious project; the fact that Haussmann was demolishing many neighborhoods in Paris and reorganizing the road system offered the ideal occasion for completely rebuilding the sewage system. His plans also included building a system of aqueducts that nearly doubled the amount of water available per person per day and quadrupling the number of homes with running water – but more fresh water also meant more waste water and more demands on the sewage system.

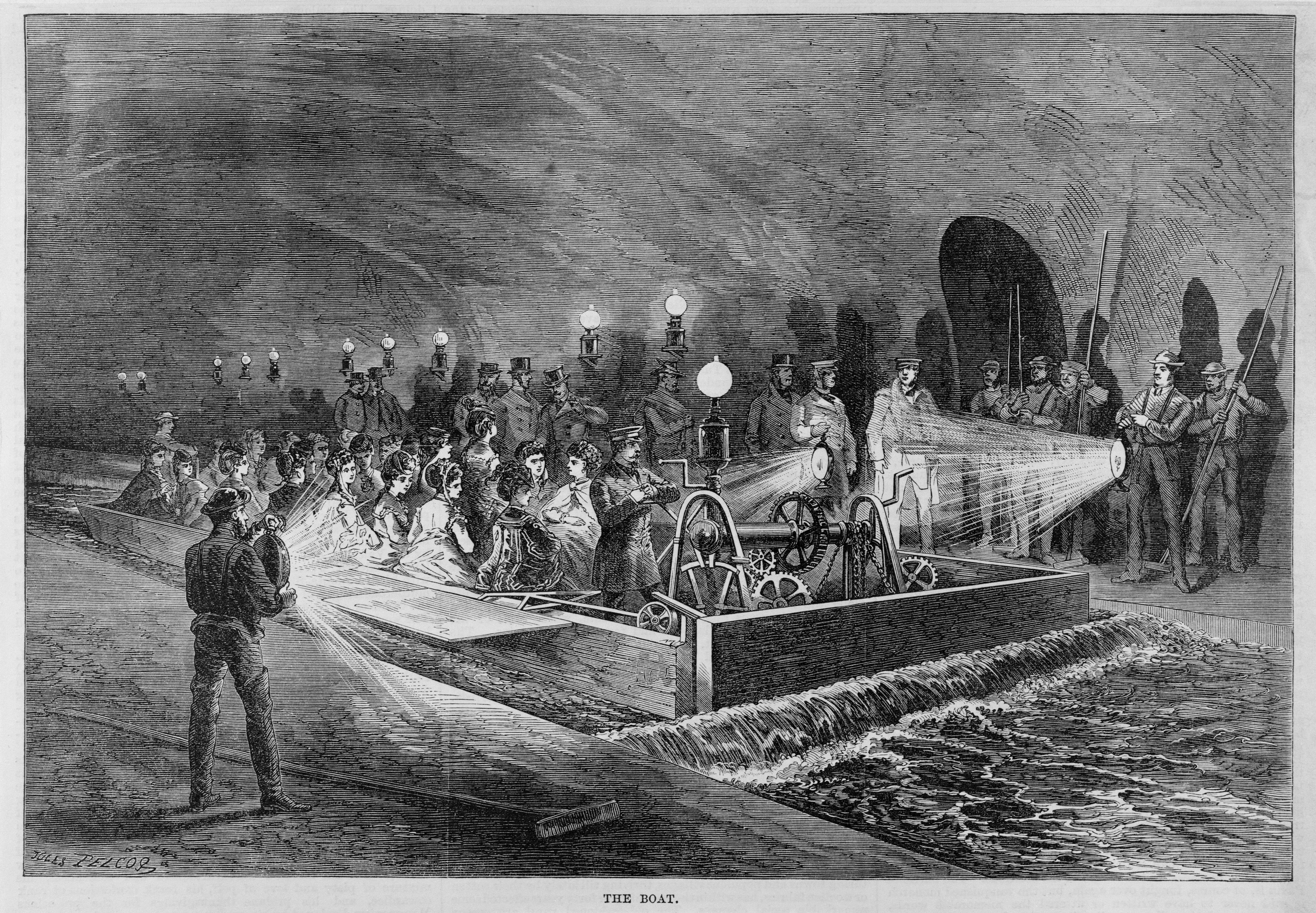
Visitors touring Belgrand's sewers aboard a boat used for cleaning the larger channels. Smaller channels had cleaning wagons.

Belgrand adopted a disciplined, engineering approach to the project. His tunnels were designed to be clean, easily accessible for maintenance, and substantially larger than the previous underground sewers. The slope of the sewers — at 3 cm per meter — was chosen to allow a man to walk safely and sand to be carried by the current. Recognizing that regular, intense bursts of water would be more efficient at flushing than a continuous flow of water, Bertrand designed a system of distributed reservoirs that would periodically release a strong stream of water. Four thousand of these reservoirs had been built by the end of the 19th century. Specially equipped boats and wagons facilitated cleaning of the sewers. The design also featured special depressions in the galleries that served as sand traps, allowing for efficient removal of sand and soil.

Belgrand's overall system consisted of a double water supply network (one for drinking water and one for non drinking water) and a sewer network that had reached a length of 600 km by 1878. From 1880 to 1913, efforts were made to connect all Parisian buildings to the sewers (most at the time were "connected to the city's clean water network and the rest had access to free neighborhood taps (fontaines)").

=== Twentieth century to the present ===
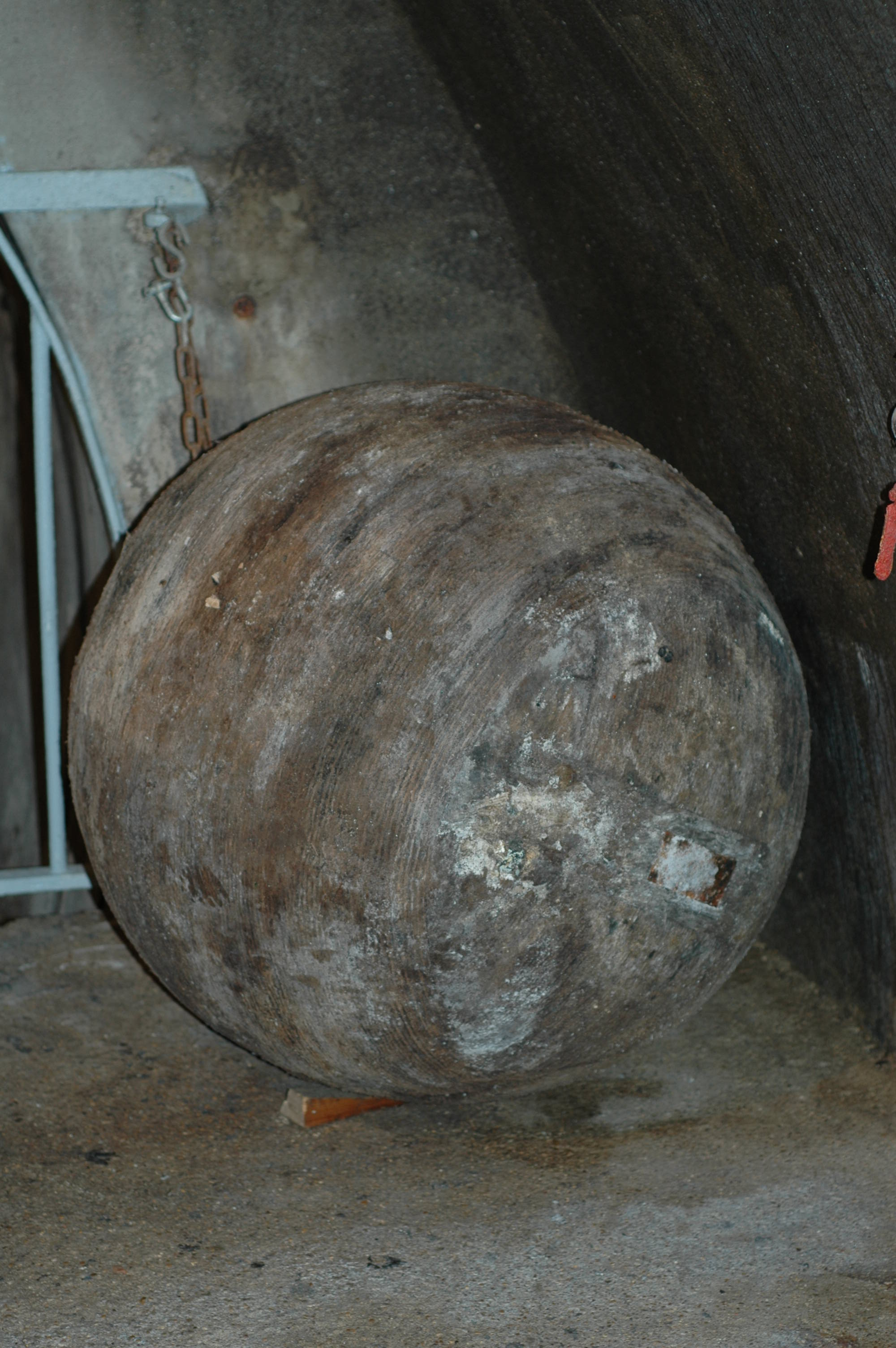
19th century wood and iron boule de curage, used to clean sewer tunnels by being rolled into blockages. Such devices of varying sizes are still used today.

Belgrand's successors continued extending the Parisian network: by 1914, 68% of all buildings in Paris had direct connections to the sewer. Research shows that this contributed to a decline in mortality. From 1914 to 1977, more than 1000 km of new sewers were built.

At the end of World War I, the 50 km^{2} of sewage fields were no longer sufficient to protect the Seine. A general sewage treatment programme, designed to meet the needs for 50 years, was drawn up and became state-approved in 1935: this was the beginning of industrial sewage treatment.

The aim was to carry all the Parisian wastewater to the Achères treatment plant using a network of effluent channels. Since then, the Achères plant has continued to grow. At the end of 1970, it was one of the biggest sewage treatment plants in Europe. Its actual capacity is more than 2 million cubic metres per day.

This programme has been gradually upgraded: modernization of the Achères and Noisy-le-Grand (a small station farther upstream) facilities, construction of a new plant at Valenton, and expansion of the Colombes experimental station.

== Modernization now and in the future ==
The aims of the modernization programme launched by the mayor of Paris in 1991 were to protect the Seine from storm overflow pollution by reducing the amount of untreated water discharged directly into the Seine, to reinforce the existing sewers, and to improve the functioning of the network.

This project, which was reported to have cost about 152 million euros over its first five years, sought to refurbish of the older sewer lines, renovate pumping stations, build new sewer lines and improve the management of solid waste and grit. It also sought to upgrade the sewer technology by installing measuring devices and automated flow control management and by developing a computerized network management system.

== The sewer in fiction ==
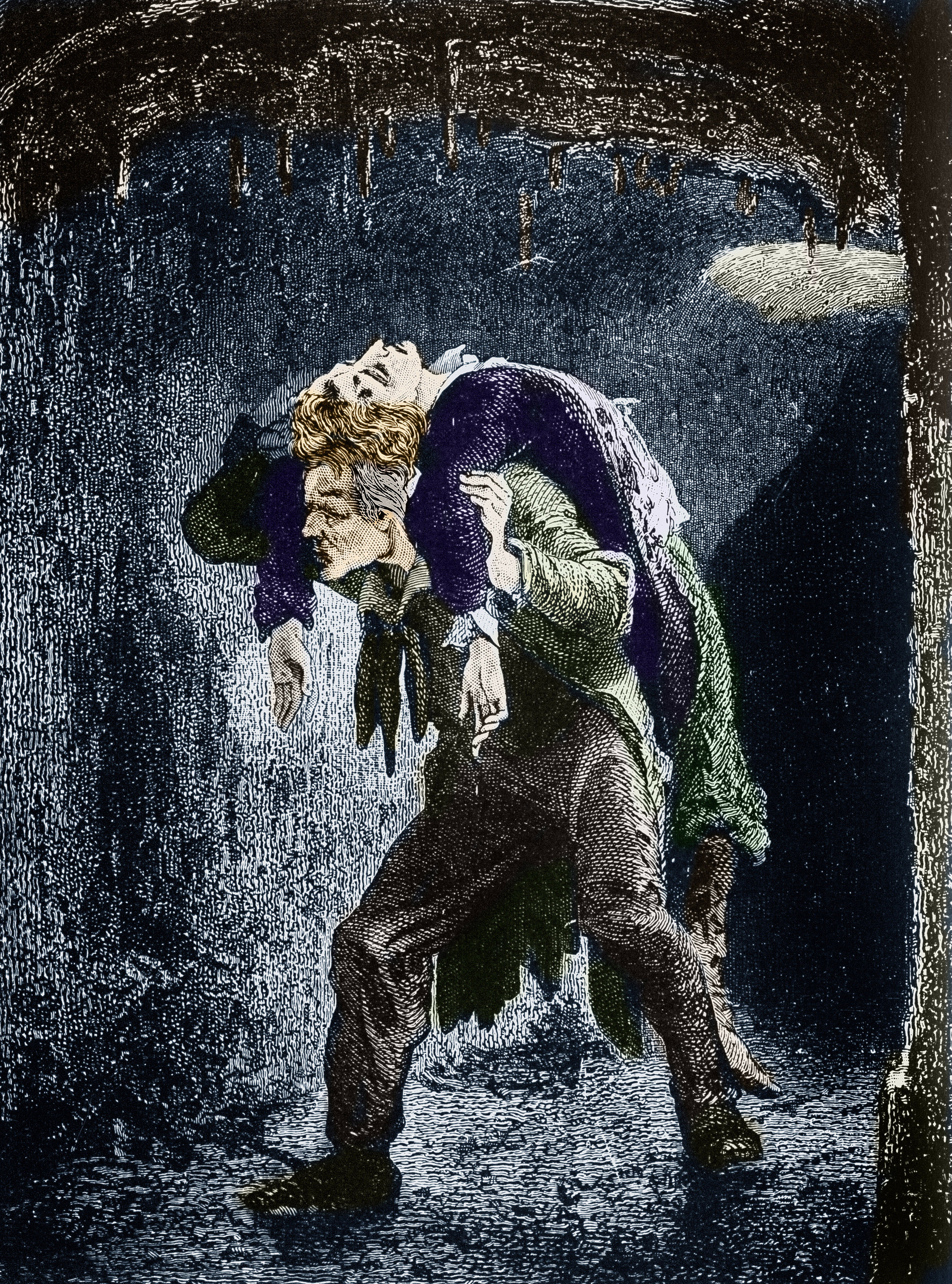
Jean Valjean carries Marius in the Paris sewers in Les Miserables. Etching by Fortuné Méaulle, c. 1880.

The sewer system is described in Victor Hugo's 1862 novel, Les Misérables (Part 5, Jean Valjean; Book II, The Intestine of the Leviathan, ch.1, The Land Impoverished by the Sea): "... Paris has another Paris under herself; a Paris of sewers; which has its streets, its crossings, its squares, its blind alleys, its arteries, and its circulation, which is slime, minus the human form", and also appears in a scene near the end of the musical based on the novel.

The sewer system plays a key part in H. L. Humes's 1958 novel, The Underground City. Humes, an American novelist, was a cofounder of the Paris Review.

The sewer features in a section of Max Brook's World War Z. Many people fled to the sewers to escape the dead, but were followed, giving rise to one of the most dangerous campaigns of the "war".

In the American television show The Honeymooners episode "The Man from Space", broadcast 31 December 1955, sewer worker Ed Norton enters dressed as an 18th-century fop, and announces that he will win the Raccoon lodge costume ball because he is dressed as "Pierre Francois de la Brioski, designer of the Paris sewers." Norton later corrected himself and said he found out that Brioski was the man who "condemned the Paris sewers."

== Museum ==
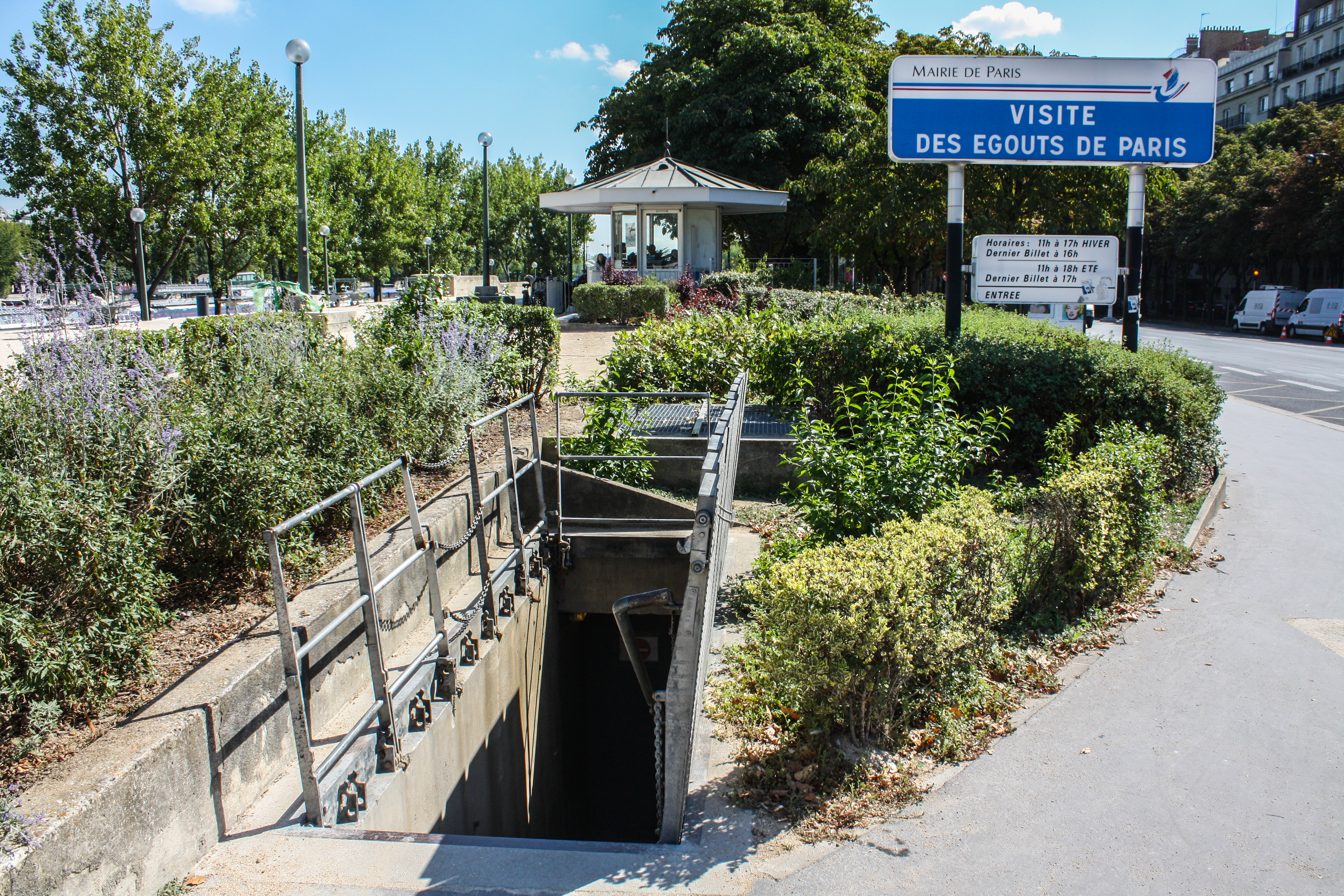
Entry to the Parisian sewer visit

The Paris Sewer Museum (French: Musée des Égouts de Paris) is dedicated to the sewer system of Paris. Tours of the sewage system have been popular since the 1800s and are currently conducted at the sewers. Visitors are able to walk upon raised walkways directly above the sewage itself. The entrance is near the Pont de l'Alma.

== See also ==
- List of museums in Paris
- Catacombs of Paris

== Bibliography ==
- Donald Reid (1991) Paris Sewers and Sewermen: Realities and Representations, Harvard University Press. ISBN 0-674-65462-5
- Donald Reid (2014) Égouts et égoutiers de Paris, Presses Universitaires de Rennes. ISBN 978-2-7535-2931-1
