= Eugène Belgrand =

French civil engineer (1810–1878)

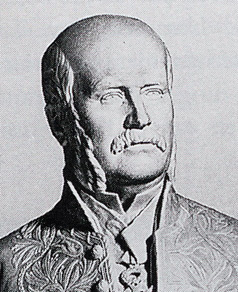
- Born: Marie François Eugène Belgrand; 23 April 1810; Ervy-le-Châtel, France
- Died: 8 April 1878 (aged 67); Paris, France
- Resting place: Montparnasse Cemetery, Paris
- Education: École des Ponts et Chaussées; École polytechnique
- Occupation: Civil engineer

Marie François Eugène Belgrand (French pronunciation: [øʒɛn bɛlɡʁɑ̃]; 23 April 1810 – 8 April 1878) was a French engineer who made significant contributions to the modernization of the Parisian sewer system during the 19th century rebuilding of Paris. Much of Belgrand's work remains in use today.

== Civil engineering ==
Prior to 1850, the water system in Paris was inadequate for its growing population. Waste water was discharged into the Seine, a primary source of the critically limited supply of drinking water. Baron Haussmann, tasked by Napoléon III to modernize the city, appointed Belgrand as Director of Water and Sewers of Paris in March 1855. Hausmann had been impressed by the École Polytechnique graduate's application of geology to water engineering during the design of a fountain in Avallon and he became an engineer from the Ponts et Chaussées School and integrated the Yonne technical services in Avallon in 1849. He studied the ancient languages.

Belgrand embarked on an ambitious project. The tunnels he designed were intended to be clean, easily accessible, and substantially larger than the previous Parisian underground. Eugène Belgrand took part in the renovation of Paris under the leadership of Haussman between 1852 and 1870: he created an innovating network of underground pipes to prevent Paris from being flooded. Under his guidance, Paris's sewer system expanded fourfold between 1852 and 1869. He also addressed the city's fresh water needs, constructing a system of aqueducts that nearly doubled the amount of water available per person per day and quadrupled the number of homes with running water. Belgrand remains famous for his works, consisting of the Paris sewers, the aqueduct on the Vanne river between Arcueil and Cachan, the aqueduct on the Dhuis river (fr: Dhuis (rivière)) and the reservoir of Montsouris (fr: Réservoir de Montsouris) which stores the water underground.

Public reaction to the improvements was overwhelmingly favourable, supported by tours of the newly constructed sewer system and a series of photographs taken by Nadar, pioneering the use of artificial lighting for photography. Belgrand shared his insights with others, writing "monumental publications" detailing his work and the science behind it.

Belgrand's projects remain "one of the most extensive urban sewer systems in the world" and served as a "transitional phase" leading to modern wastewater processing. Belgrand wrote the history of Paris.

== Commemoration ==
To commemorate his work in Parisian civil engineering, Belgrand's name is one of 72 names engraved on the Eiffel Tower, opposite the École Militaire. The main gallery of the Paris Sewer Museum is also named in his honor, as is a street in Paris.

Now his name is a school's name in the small town of Ervy-le-Châtel.
