= Vanne (river) =

River in France

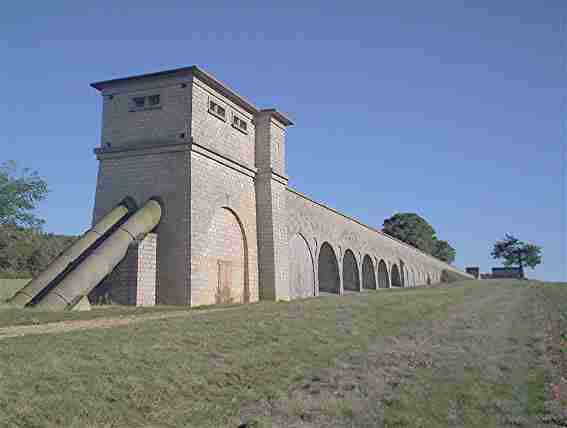

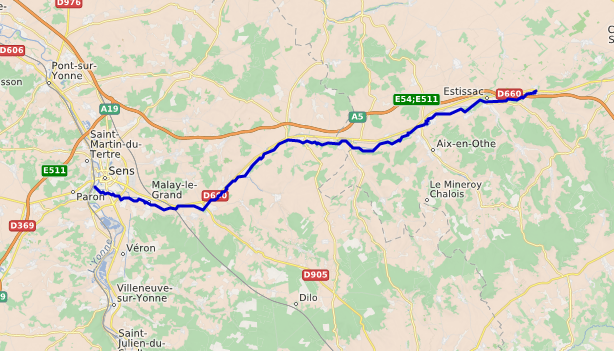

Location
- Country: France

Physical characteristics
- Source
  - location: Aube department
- Mouth
  - location: Yonne
  - coordinates: 48°11′24″N 3°16′8″E
- Length: 59 km (37 mi)
- Basin size: 990 km^{2} (380 sq mi)

Basin features
- Progression: Yonne→ Seine→ English Channel

The Vanne (French pronunciation: [van]) is a 58.8 km (36.5 mi) river in France, a right tributary of the Yonne. Its drainage basin area is 990 km^{2} (380 sq mi). It rises in the Aube department, in the village of Fontvannes, west of Troyes and flows into the Yonne at Sens.

The Vanne flows through the following departments and towns:

- Aube: Estissac
- Yonne: Villeneuve-l'Archevêque, Malay-le-Grand, Sens

== Aqueduct on the Vanne ==
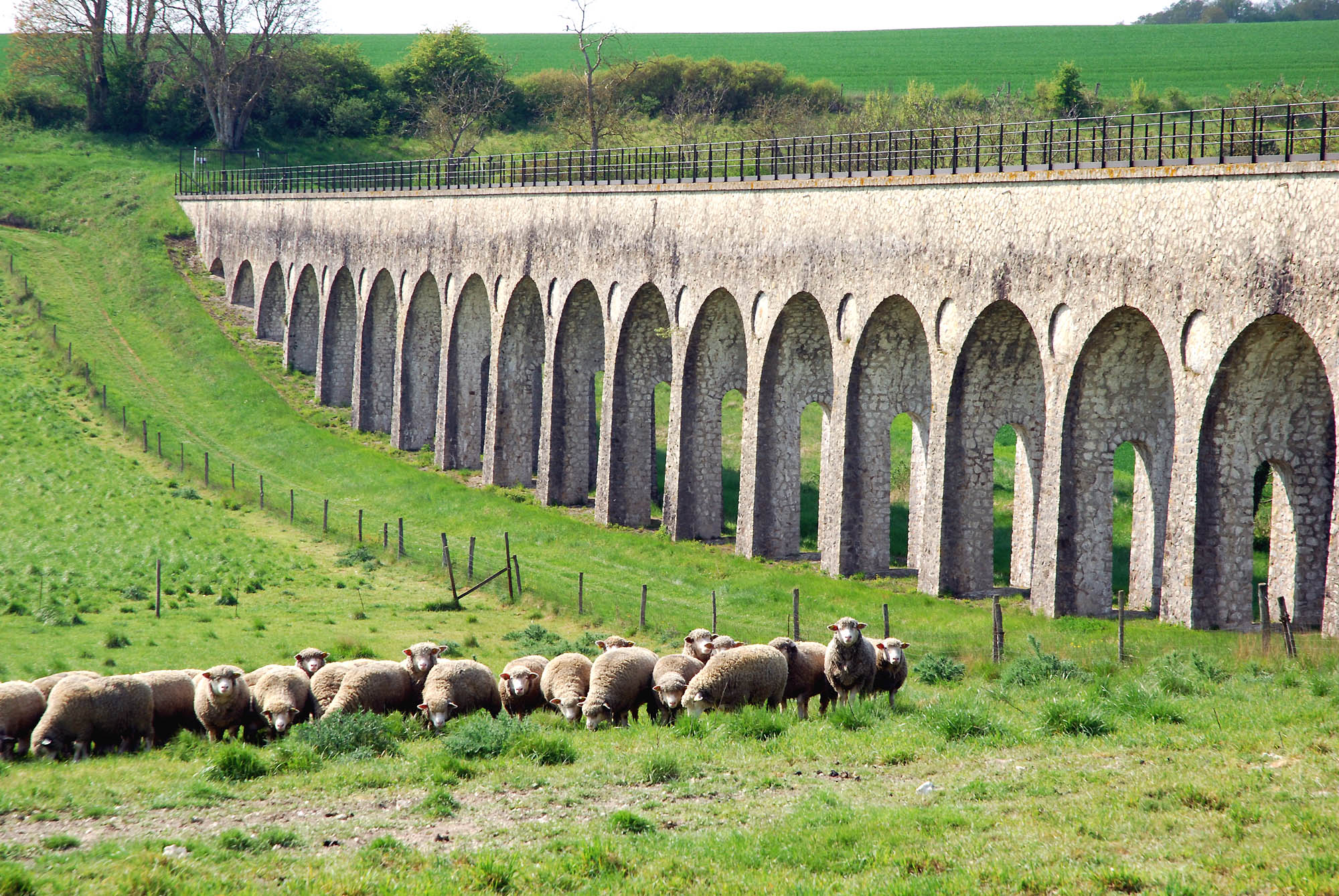
Aqueduc de la Vanne towards Villiers-Louis.

The Aqueduct on the Vanne was designed by Eugène Belgrand to fill the underground Montsouris reservoir (fr) and thus provide potable water to the city of Paris.
