= Torch =

Stick with a flaming end used as a source of light

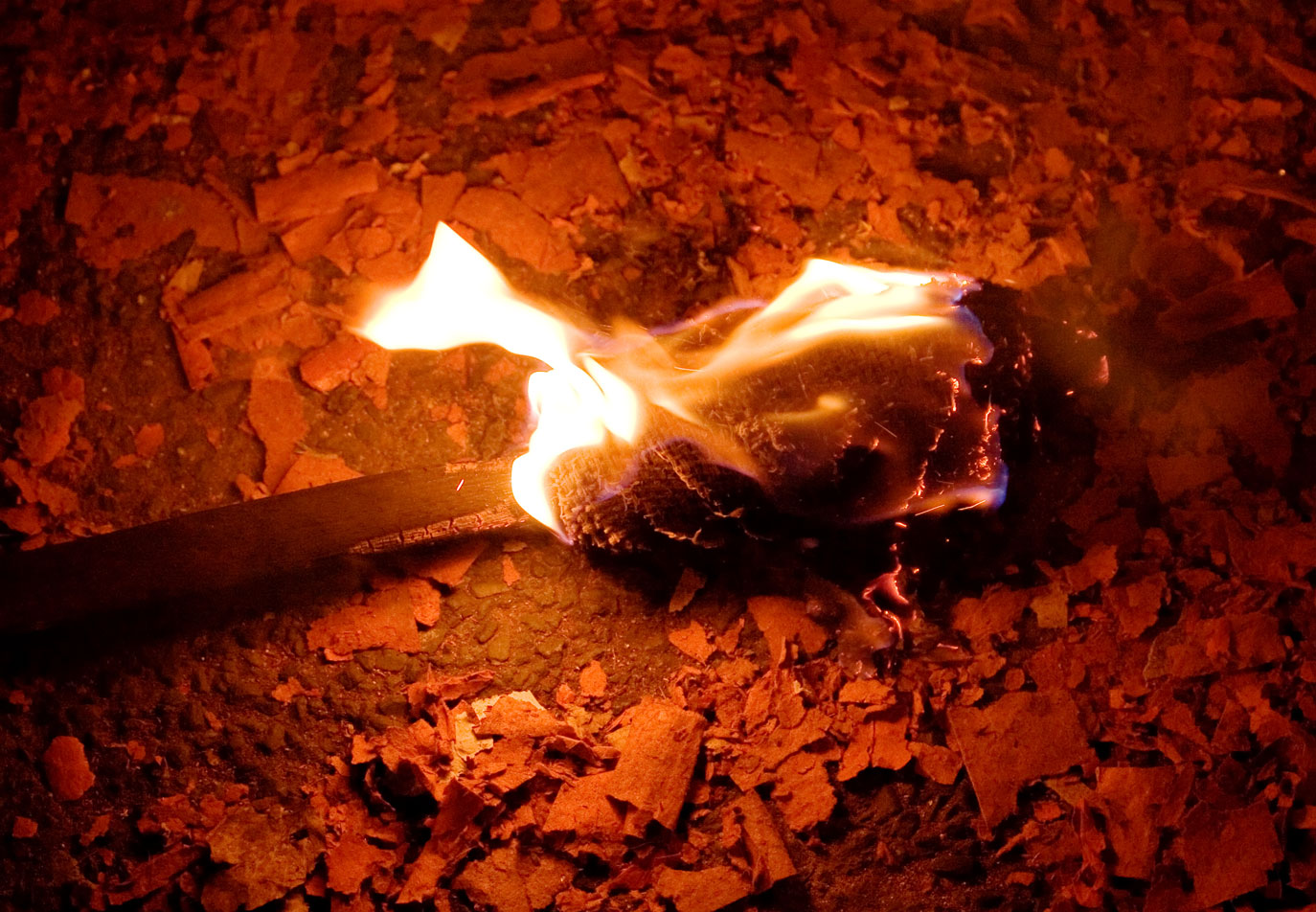
A burning torch, discarded on the road in the wake of the Lewes Bonfire Night celebrations

A torch is a stick with combustible material at one end which can be used as a light source or to set something on fire. Torches have been used throughout history and are still used in processions, symbolic and religious events, and in juggling and entertainment. In some countries, notably the United Kingdom and Australia, "torch" in modern usage is also the term for a battery-operated portable light.

== Etymology ==
From the Old French "torche" meaning "twisted thing", hence "torch formed of twisted tow dipped in wax", probably from Vulgar Latin *torca, alteration of Late Latin torqua, variant of classical Latin torques "collar of twisted metal", from torquere "to twist".

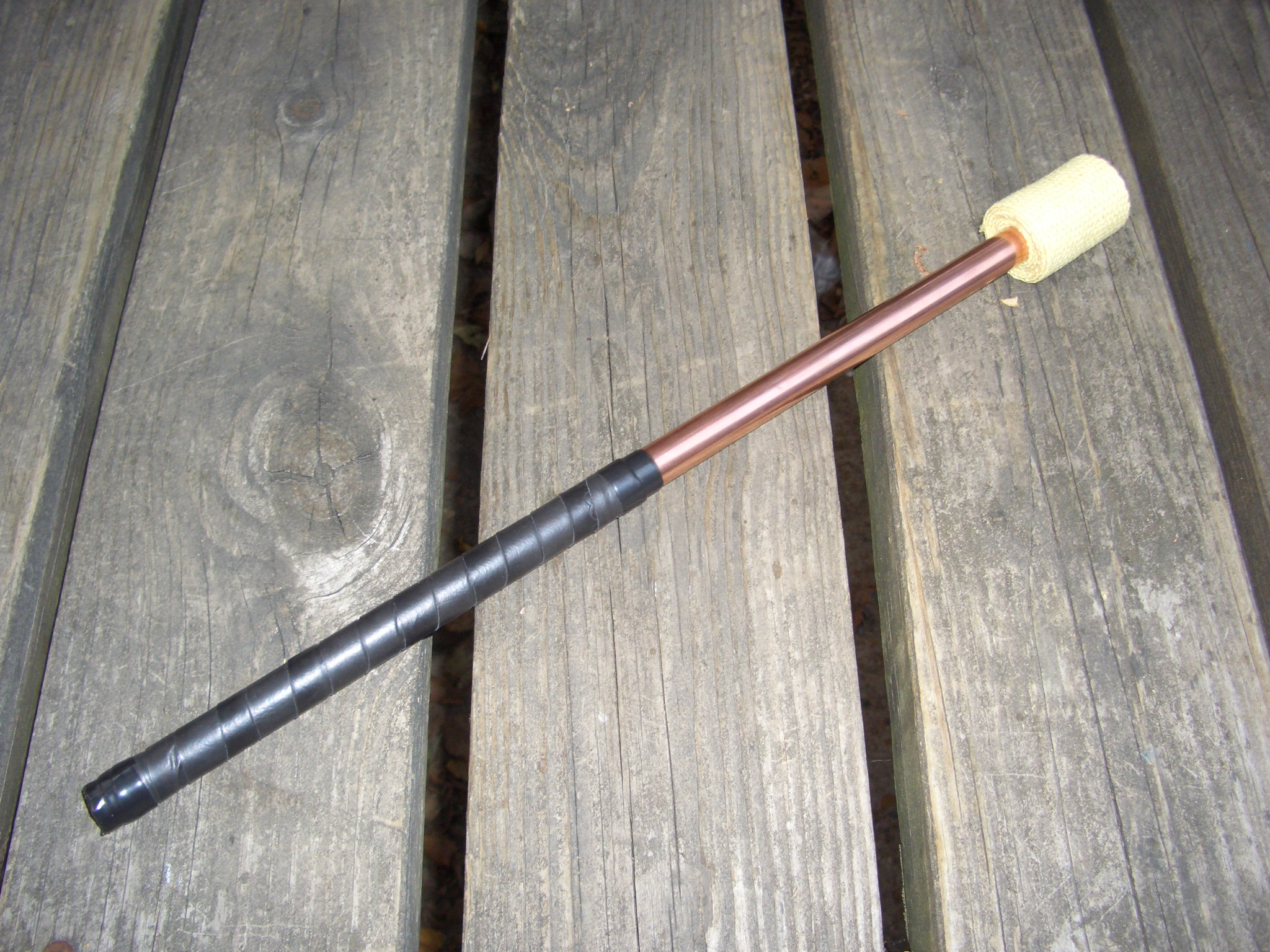
An unlit torch as used for fire breathing

== Torch construction ==
Torch construction has varied through history depending on the torch's purpose. Torches were usually constructed of a wooden stave with one end wrapped in a material which was soaked in a flammable substance. In the United States, black bear bones may have been used. Modern procession torches are made from coarse hessian rolled into a tube and soaked in wax. A wooden handle is usually used, and a cardboard collar is attached to deflect any wax droplets. They are an easy, safe and relatively cheap way to hold a flame aloft in a parade or to provide illumination in any after-dark celebration.

Modern torches suitable for juggling are made of a wooden-and-metal or metal-only stave with one end wrapped in a Kevlar wick. This wick is soaked in a flammable liquid, such as kerosene.

== Symbolism ==

The torch is a common emblem of both enlightenment and hope, thus the Statue of Liberty, formally named Liberty Enlightening the World, lifts her torch. Crossed reversed torches were signs of mourning that appear on Greek and Roman funerary monuments—a torch pointed downwards symbolizes death, while a torch held up symbolizes life, truth and the regenerative power of flame. The torch is also a symbol used by political parties, for instance by both Labour (from 1918 to 1980) and the Conservatives (from 1983 to 2006) in the UK, and by the Malta Labour Party. In the seals of schools in the Philippines, the torch symbolizes the vision of education to provide enlightenment to all the students.

The torch is also associated with the Greek goddess of witchcraft known as Hecate in some works of art.

Ancient Greeks used torches in some of their festivals. For example, the Athenians held at least five festivals featuring torches, including the Panathenaea, the Hephaistia, and the Prometheia. According to Istros the Callimachean, the torch race was first introduced by the Athenians during sacrifices to Hephaestus, in honor of him as the one who mastered the use of fire and taught it to others. The origin of the custom may also lie in honoring Prometheus, the bringer of fire. Torch races were celebrated in many different Greek cities in honour of various deities.

Detail of frieze of winged half figures with torch of learning in the Library of Congress Thomas Jefferson Building, Washington, D.C.

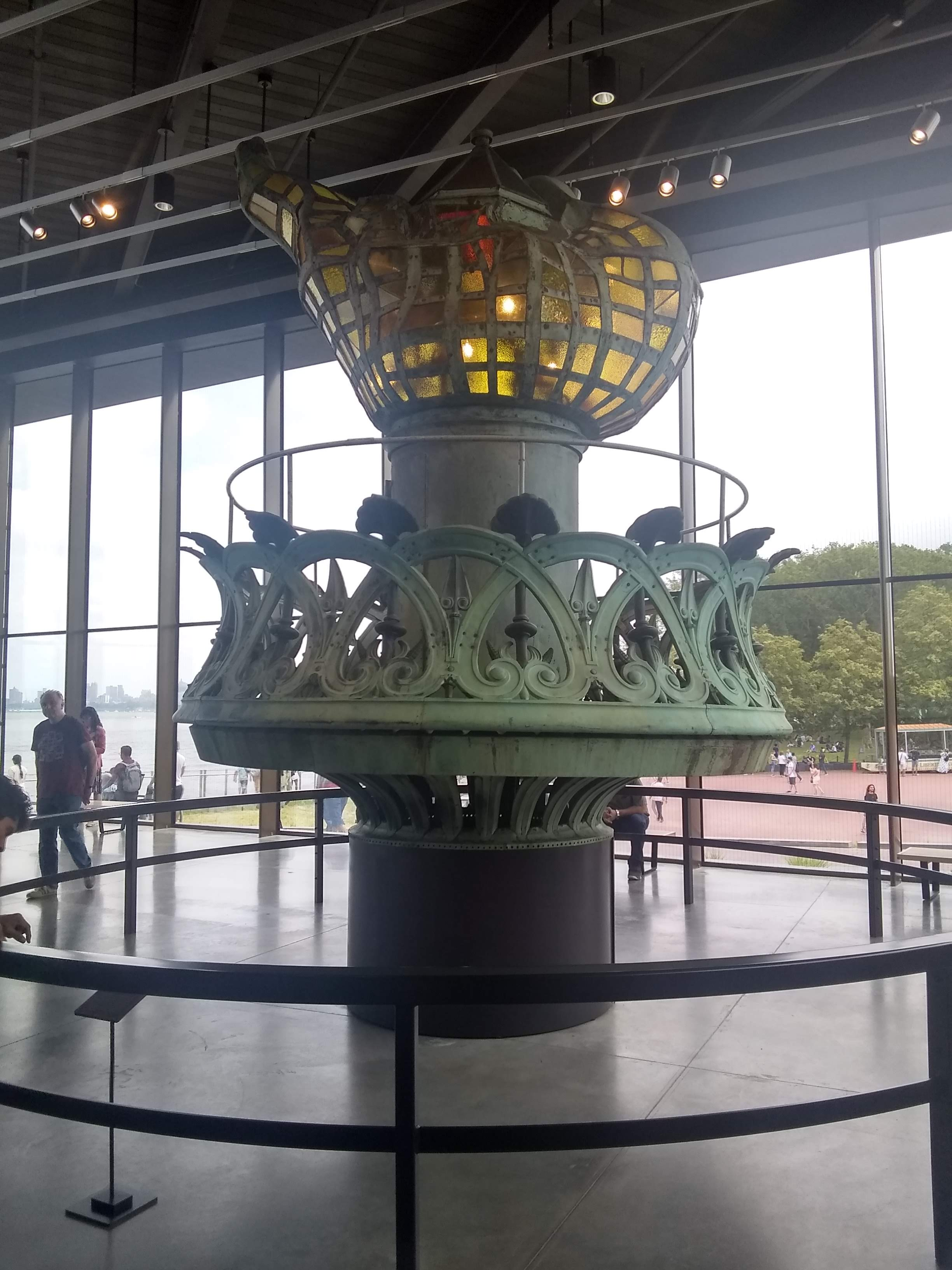
The original 1886–1984 torch of the Statue of Liberty (Liberty Enlightening the World) is housed in the Statue of Liberty Museum on Liberty Island, New York City

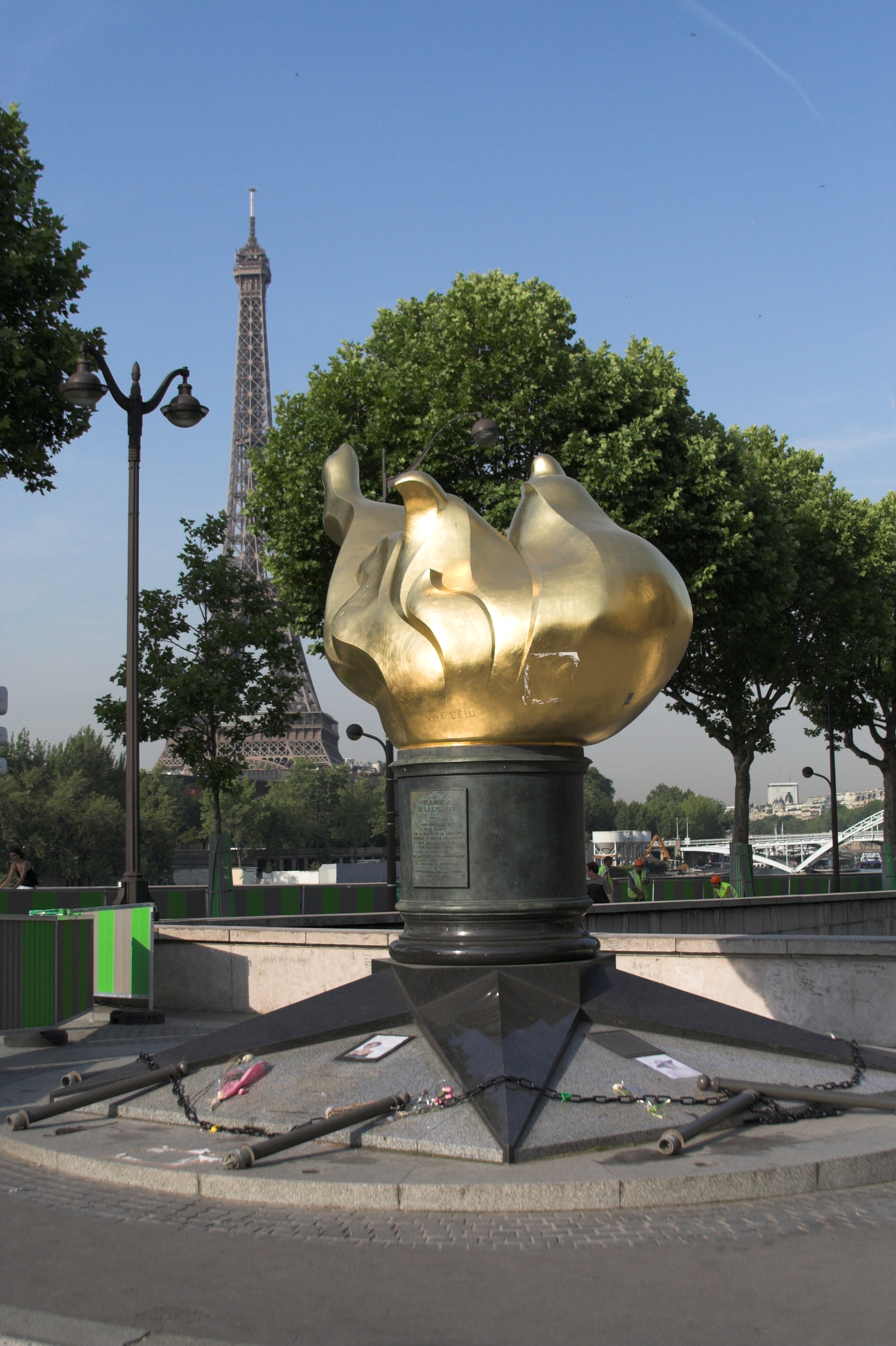
Flame of Liberty, Place Diana, Paris

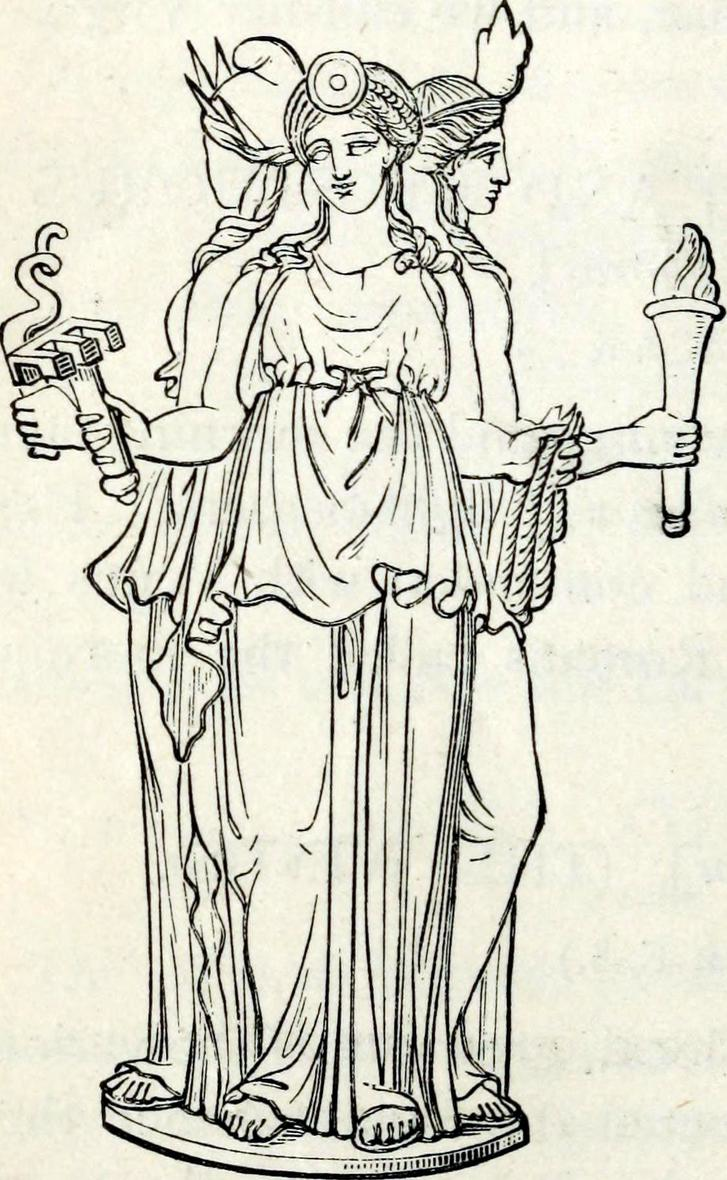
The goddess Hecate holding a torch to her right

== Uses ==
=== Olympics ===
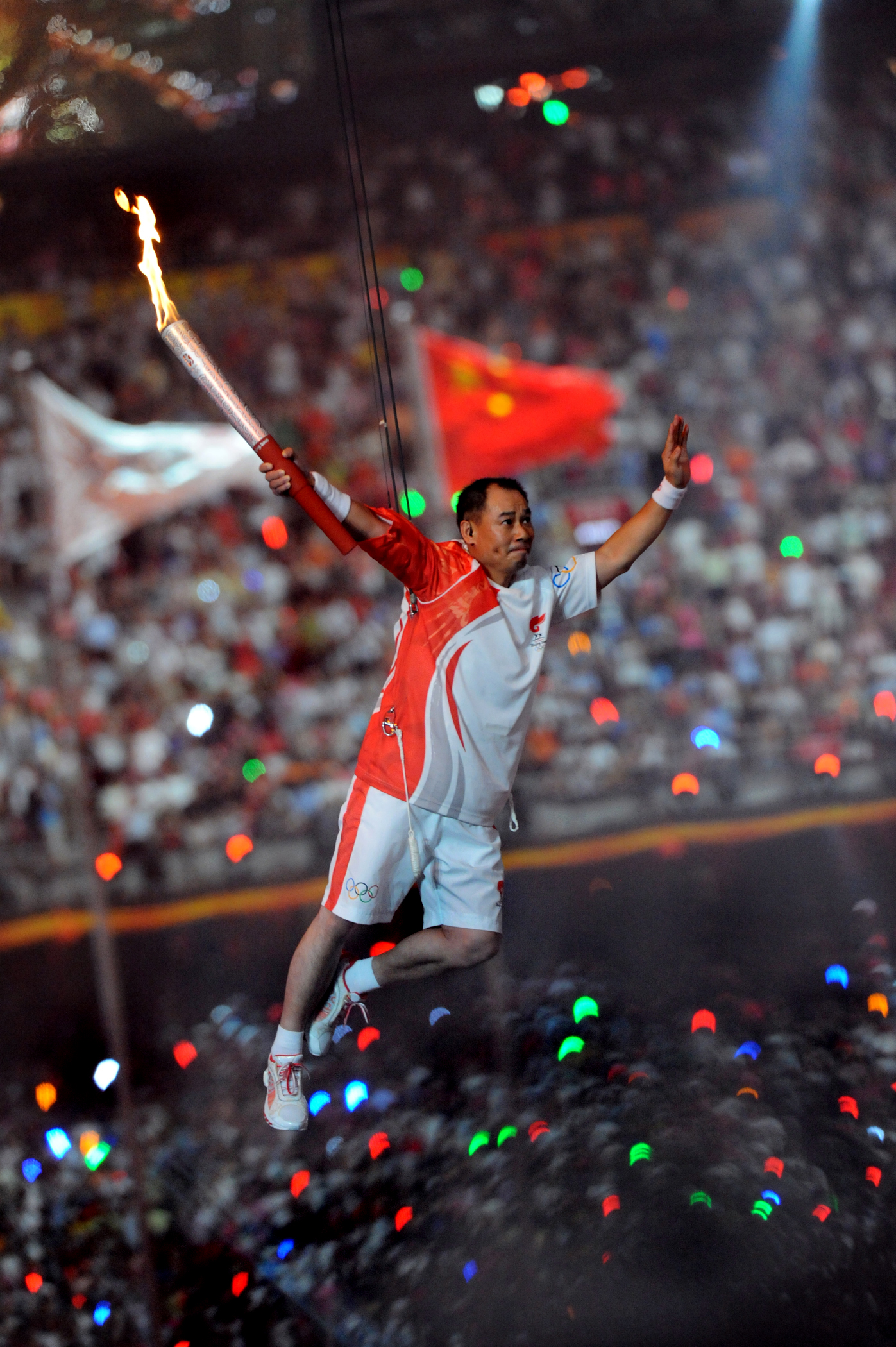
Li Ning lighting the Olympic flame at the 2008 Summer Olympics

The torch carried in relay by runners is used to light the Olympic flame which burns without interruption until the end of the Games. These torches and the relay tradition were introduced in the 1936 Summer Olympics by Carl Diem, the chairman of the event because during the duration of the Ancient Olympic Games in Olympia, a sacred flame burnt inside of the temple of Hera, kept in custody by her priestess.

=== Juggling ===
Juggling torches are often used as a prop in toss juggling: they can be flipped into the air in an end-over-end motion while being juggled, in the same manner as juggling clubs or juggling knives, but because of their sound and 'trail of flame', they can appear much more impressive to audiences. To a skilled juggler, there is only a slight chance of being burned, but they are still dangerous.

=== In Roman Catholic liturgy ===
In former times, liturgical torches were carried in Eucharistic processions simply to give light. The Church eventually adopted their use for Solemn High Masses.

According to Adrian Fortescue, the more correct form of liturgical torches are non-freestanding (i.e. cannot stand up on their own). However, today, even in the Vatican, freestanding, tall candles in ornate candle-stick holders have replaced the former type. The torches are carried by torchbearers, who enter at the Sanctus and leave after Communion.

Anglicans of the High Church and some Lutherans use torches in some of their liturgical celebrations as well.

=== Torchlight march ===
Torchlight march is a type of illuminated procession which is held after dark so that torches carried by the participants form a spectacle (other types of an illuminated procession involve candles, lanterns etc).

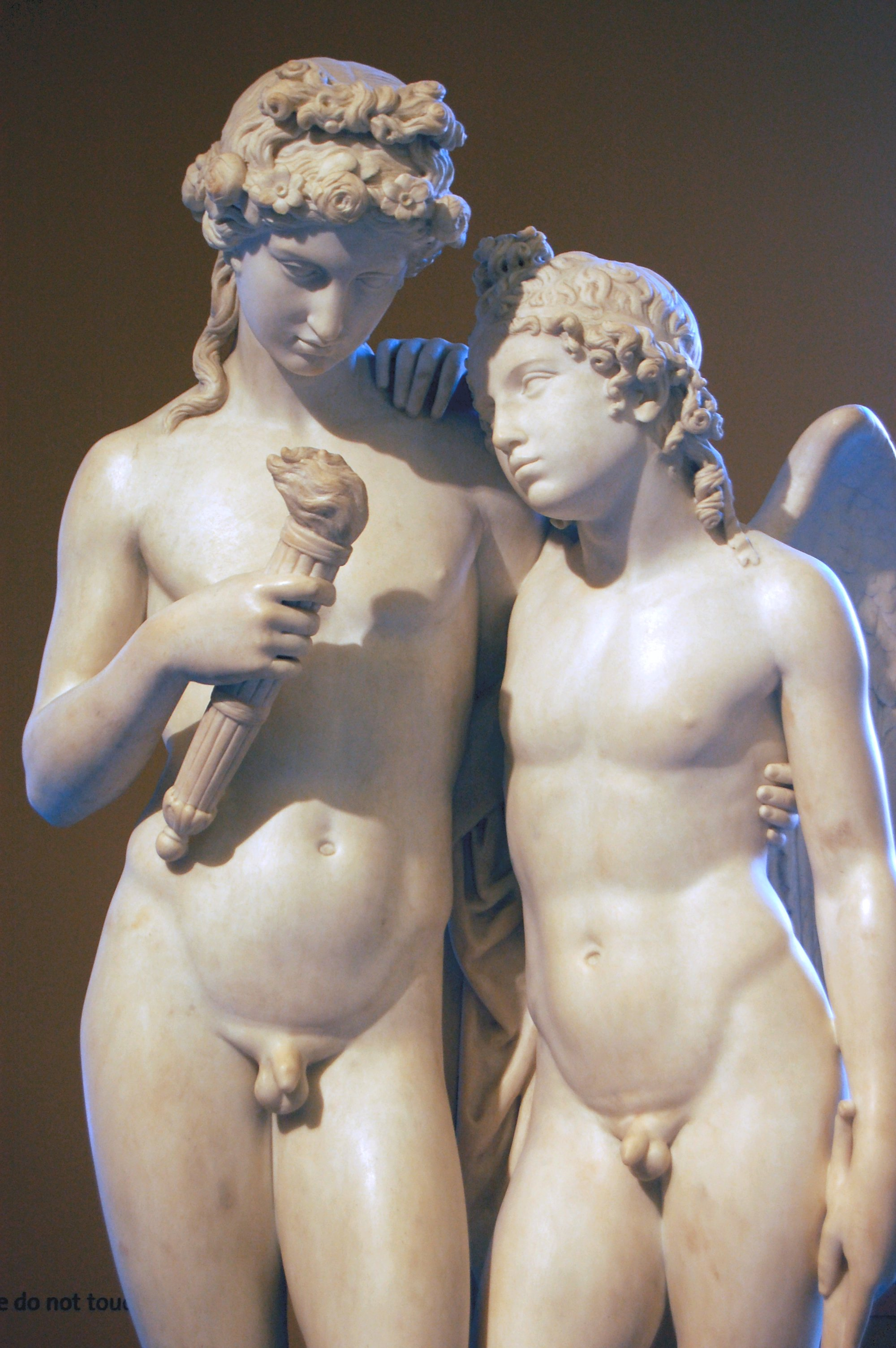
Cupid Rekindling the Torch of Hymen by George Rennie

=== Underwater diving ===
Magnesium torches were used commonly in the 1950s and 1960s as a means of underwater illumination. Magnesium burns with a bright white light, and burns underwater also.

== Associations ==
=== Love ===
The association of a torch with love may date to the Greek and Roman tradition of a wedding torch, lit in the bride's hearth on her wedding night, then used to light the hearth in her new home. Such a torch is associated with the Greek god of marriage Hymen.

The idiom to carry a torch (for someone) means to love or to be romantically infatuated with someone, especially when such feelings are not reciprocated. It is often used to characterize a situation in which a romantic relationship has ended, but where one partner still loves the other. It is considered by some to be dated, but still in wide usage. A torch song is typically a sentimental love song in which a singer laments an unrequited love.

== Gallery ==
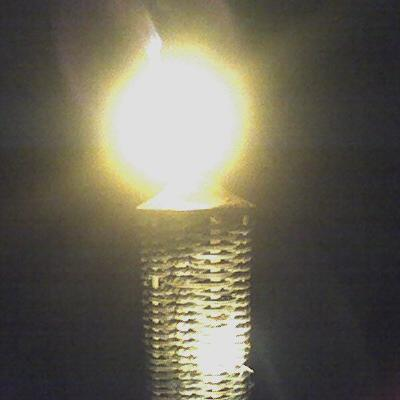
A tiki torch

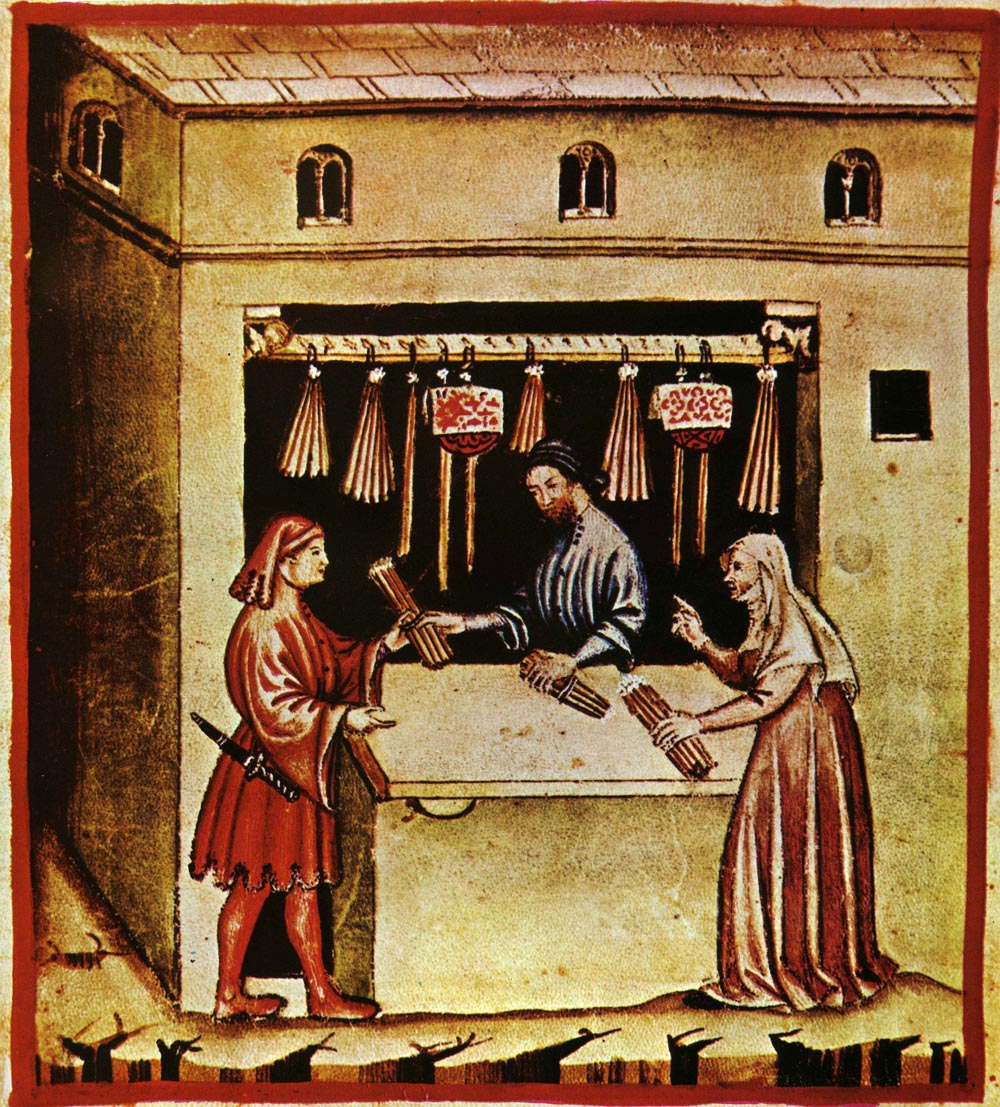
Torch seller, tacuinum sanitatis casanatensis (14th century)

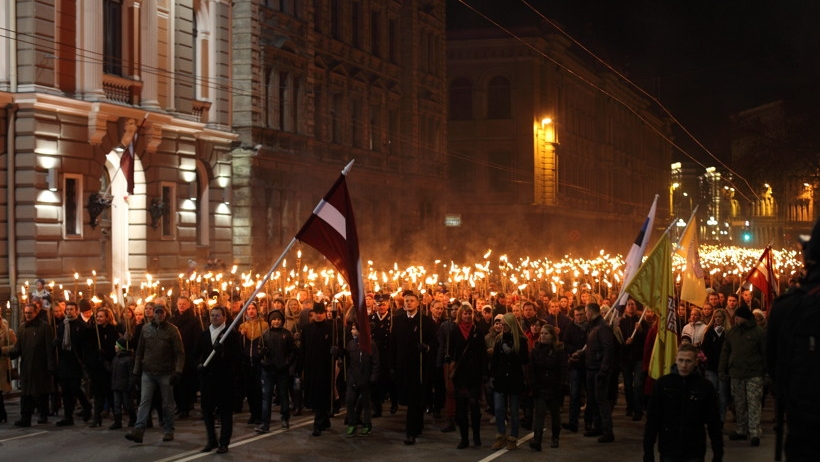
18 November Torchlight procession 2013 in Riga, Latvia

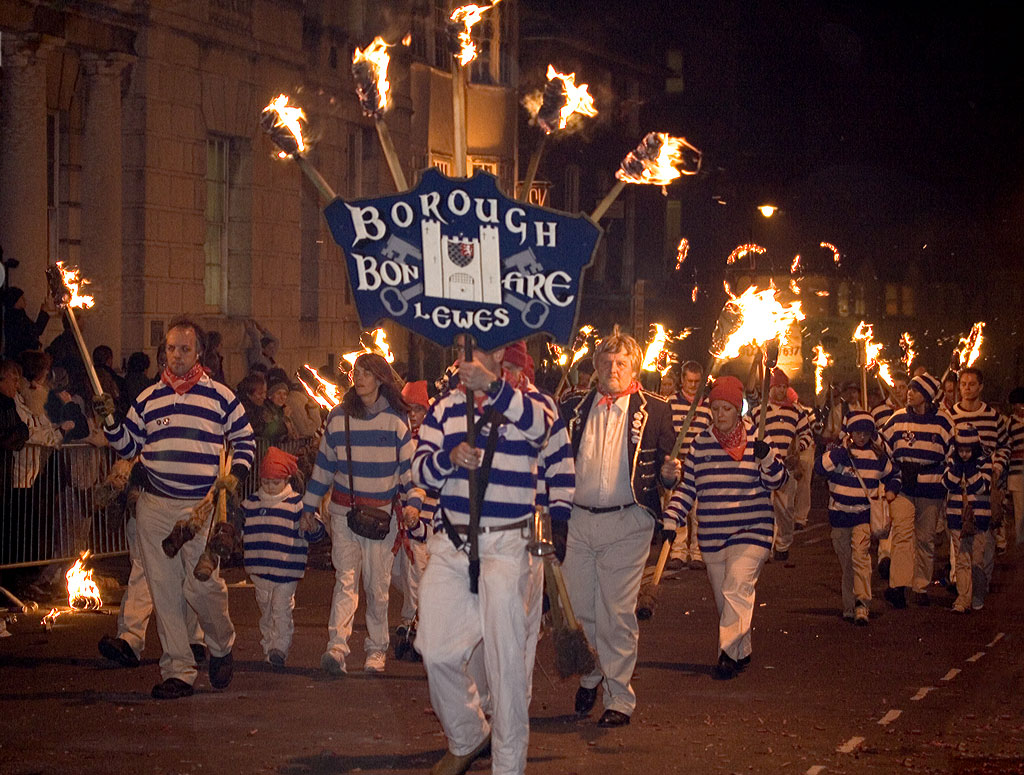
Bonfire Night celebrations in Lewes, Sussex on 5 November

Two torches in the coat of arms of Hartola

A torch on the Flag of Zaire, 1971–1997

== See also ==
- Blowtorch
- Cresset
- List of light sources
- Sconce (light fixture)
