= Flare =

Pyrotechnic light source

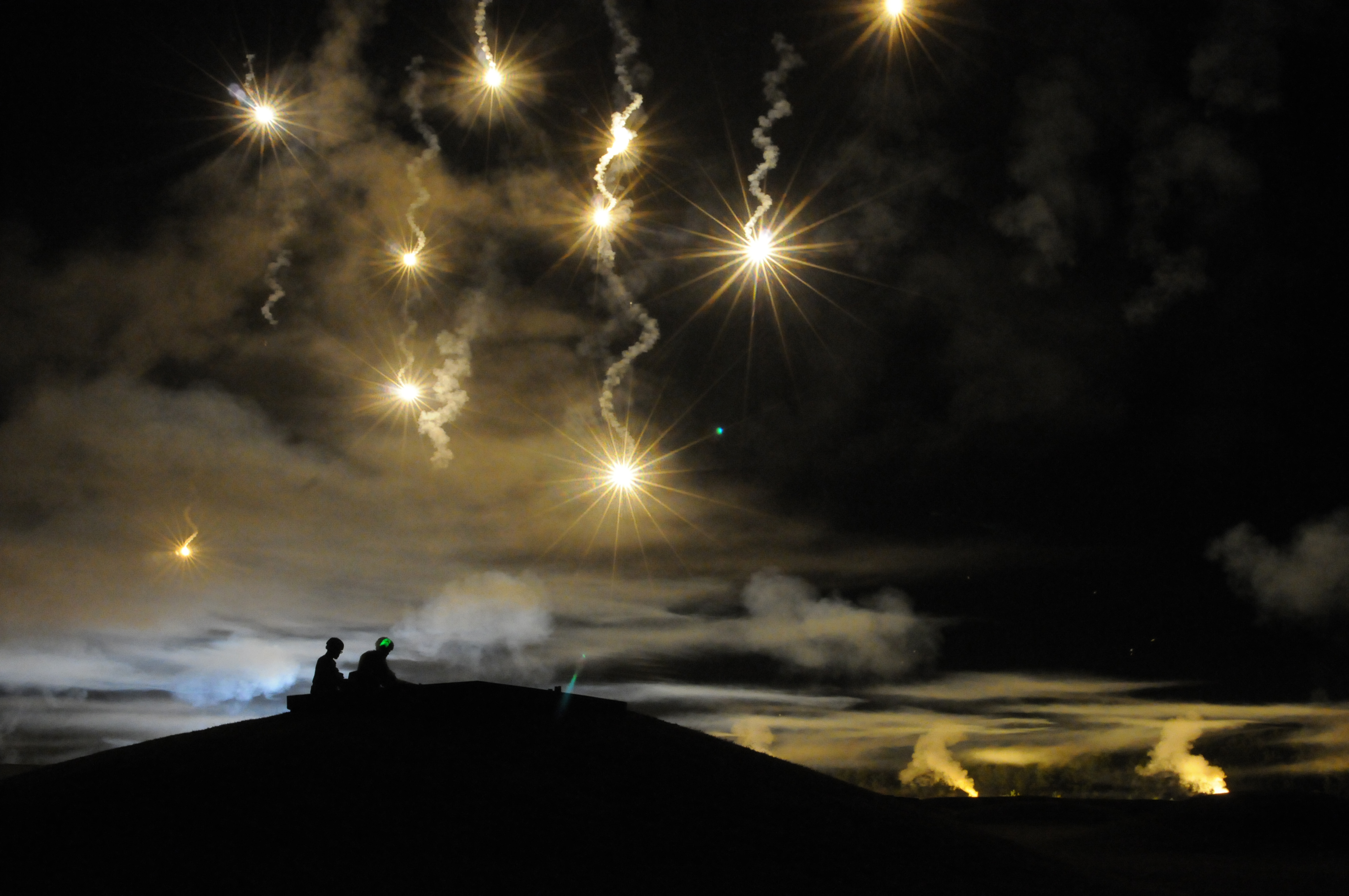
Illumination flares being used during military training exercises

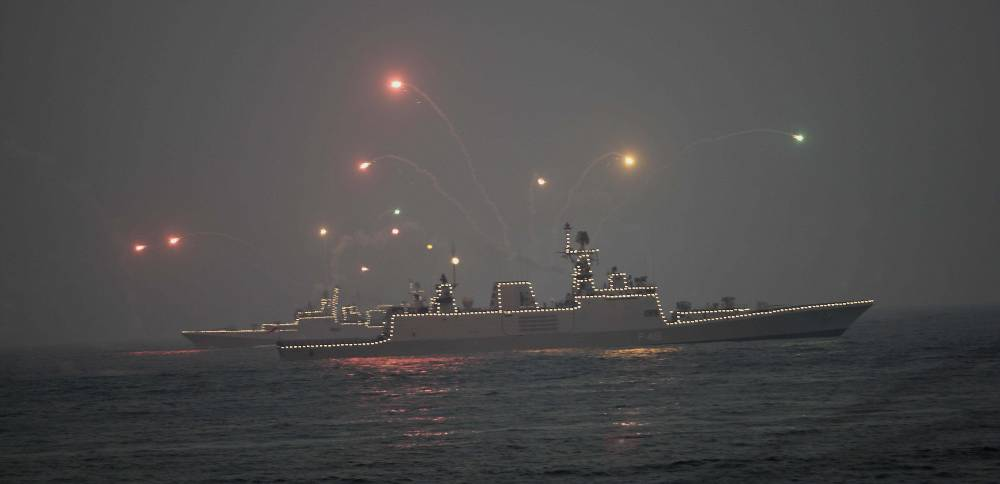
Flares being fired from a ship during a fleet review

A flare is a type of pyrotechnic that produces a bright light or intense heat without an explosion. Flares are used for distress signaling, illumination, or defensive countermeasures in civilian and military applications. Flares may be ground pyrotechnics, projectile pyrotechnics, or parachute-suspended to provide maximum illumination time over a large area. Projectile pyrotechnics may be dropped from aircraft, fired from rocket or artillery, or deployed by flare guns or handheld percussive tubes.

== Origin ==
The earliest recorded use of gunpowder for signaling purposes was the 'signal bomb' used by the Chinese Song Dynasty (960–1279) as the Mongol-led Yuan Dynasty (1271–1368) besieged Yangzhou in 1276. These soft-shelled bombs, timed to explode in midair, were used to send messages to a detachment of troops far in the distance. Another mention of the signal bomb appears in a text dating from 1293 requesting their collection from those still stored in Zhejiang. A signal gun appears in Korea by 1600. The Wu I Thu Phu Thung Chih or Illustrated Military Encyclopedia, written in 1791, depicts a signal gun in an illustration.

== Transition ==
Chinese fireworks and other pyrotechnic technologies accompanied the spread of gunpowder to European countries. Countries like Italy and Germany adopted fireworks as both a form of art and science, fostering chemical and technological advancements. However, European pyrotechnicians known as "fire masters", fell short on developing effective signal flares as they relied on a mix composed of gunpowder, saltpeter, and colorant metals that cause quick combustion. These were nicknamed blue lights, and despite shining a bright white light, colors were difficult to make out and were deemed unreliable for communication purposes. This was the closest known signal flare developed by Europeans. It was not until 1859 that American inventor Martha Jane Coston continued Benjamin Franklin Coston's (her husband) work and developed a patented "Pyrotechnic Night Signal" that utilizes oxidizers, fuel, and colorants (see Chemistry) to create bright, long-lasting flares. Alongside the invention of the Pyrotechnic Night Signal, Coston developed a code system for maritime use, creating an effective communication method out at sea. Her advancements in the chemical and technical composition of signal flares were applied to roadside, rail, military, and maritime safety devices and became the standard for modern flares across all applications today.

== Civilian use ==
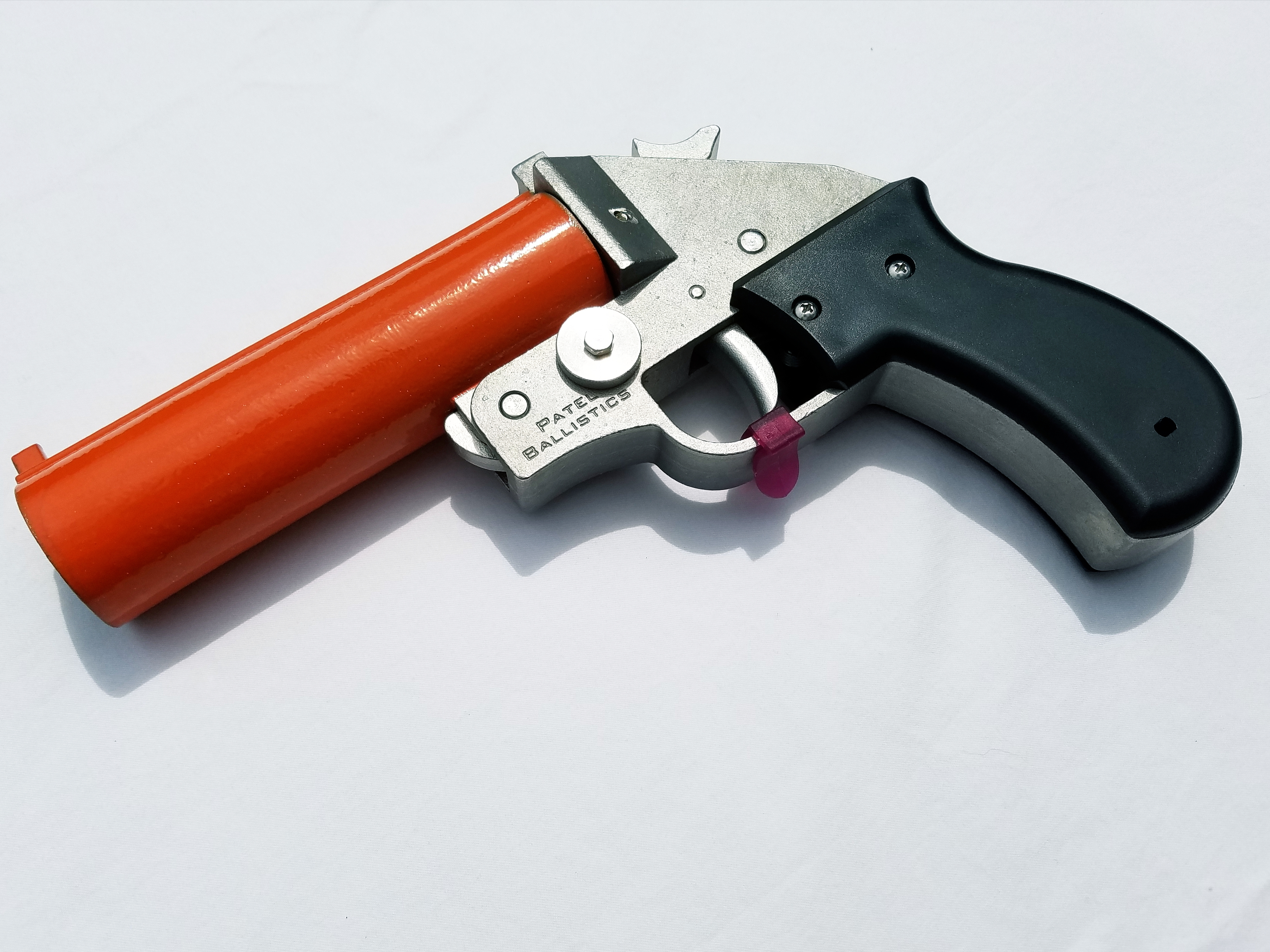
A conventional flare pistol. This particular model uses 26.5-millimeter (1.04 in) flares (manufactured by Patel Ballistics).

In the civilian world, flares are commonly used as signals, and may be ignited on the ground, fired as an aerial signal from a pistol-like flare gun, or launched from a self-contained tube. Flares are commonly found in marine survival kits.

=== Maritime distress signal ===
Distress rockets (aka "rocket-propelled parachute flares") have been mentioned in the modern era for civilian maritime emergencies since at least 1856. The U.S. Nautical Magazine of that year mentions the use of "rocket stations" for ship related emergencies. White rockets were solely used until 1873, when commander John Yorke of the Royal Navy suggested that rockets for distress should have a distinctive color. The request was made to help ease confusion between ships in distress and rockets used by pilot ships. By 1875, the UK Board of Trade had issued regulations for captains in regards to night signals. Rockets containing at least 16oz of composition were only to be used as a sign for a ship in distress. Passenger ships at the time were required to carry 12 of these rockets. The Merchant Shipping Act 1894 further stated that these rockets were to be fired one at a time in short intervals of approximately one minute apart. Distress rockets continued to be used in different colors, as was the case with RMS Titanic. At the time shipping companies had "a particular kind of distress rocket (that differed by color)". Each ship was also given a guide of colors to use depending on what signal was to be sent.

Modern red distress signals are mentioned by the United States Bureau of Mines as early as 1959, where they state "12 handheld rocket-propelled parachute red flare distress signals" are to be used by ocean going ships. The color red was eventually incorporated for use in the United States on 17 December 1979 as part of a "Universal color language". Red distress rockets and/or flares are now internationally recognized symbols that indicate a ship in distress. The International Convention for the Safety of Life at Sea (SOLAS) has standards for visual signals, including both handheld and aerial flares. Handheld flares must burn for at least one minute at an average luminosity of 15,000 candelas, while aerial flares must burn for at least 40 seconds with a 30,000-candela average luminosity.

While rockets and flares are still an option for signaling distress, they have since been surpassed by improved technology. Distress signals can now be sent using automated radio signals from a search and rescue transponder. Other internationally recognized methods include the radio message SOS, which was used during the 1912 sinking of the Titanic, and the emergency procedure word "Mayday", which dates to the 1920s.

=== Roadside and rail ===
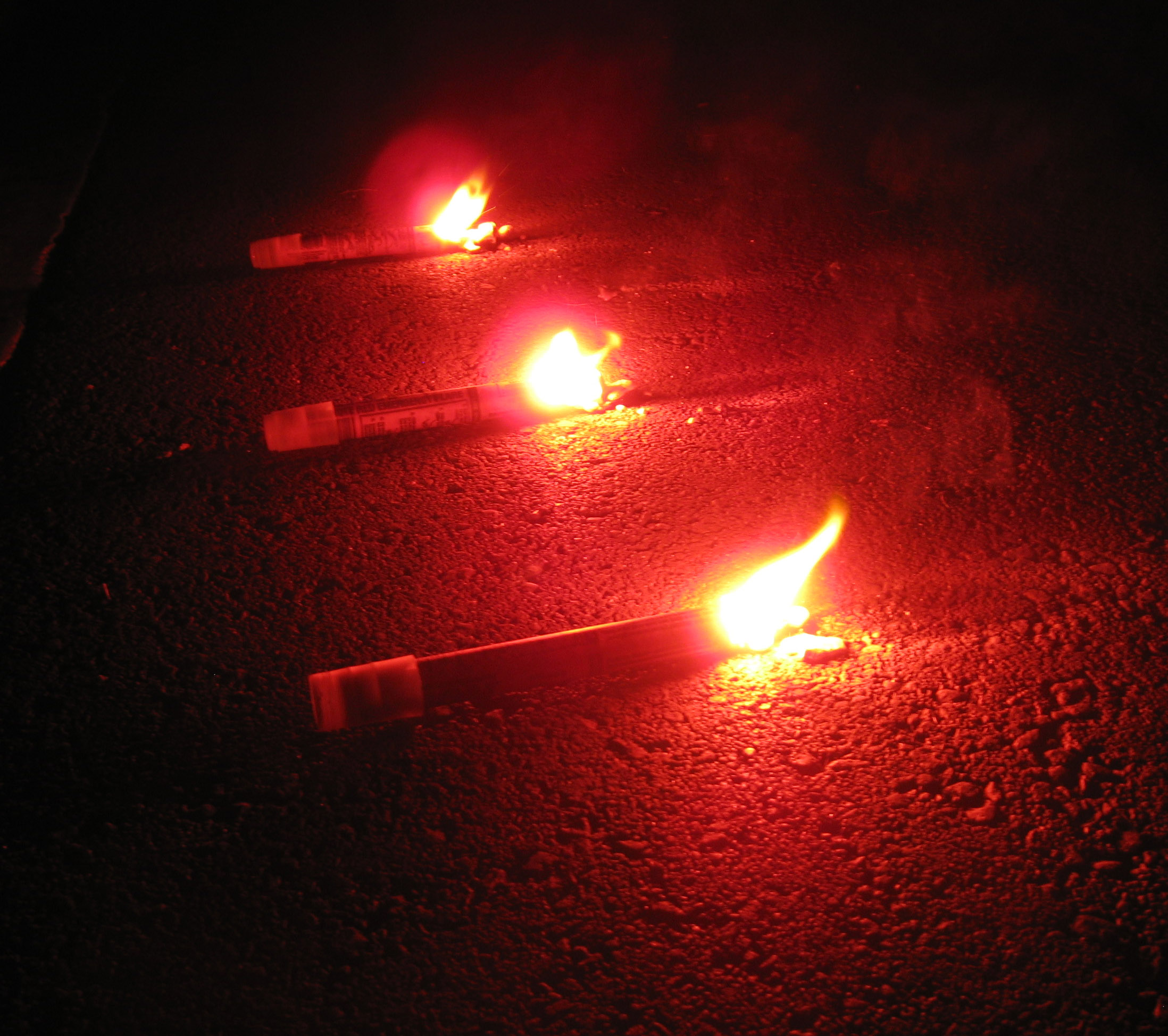
Three road flares burning

Another type of flare is the fusee, which burns with a bright red light. These come in two main types which are used for roadways and rail transportation. The first type are fusees used for roadways which are known as highway flares or road flares. These are commonly used to indicate obstacles or advise caution on roadways at night and are found in roadside emergency kits. Law enforcement also may use these flares (either propped on a biped or laid flat) to signal traffic hazards or that a road is blocked, often as a more visible replacement for traffic cones. Law enforcement in the United States usually use magnesium-based flares that last from 15–30 minutes.

Fusees used for rail are known as railroad flares, they are commonly used to perform hand signals or used as torches in rail transport applications. Railroad flares can burn for at least 10 minutes, are not fastened to train cars, and are handheld by railroad personnel for protection at night. It was argued during an Appeals case that railroad flares are much more visible than lanterns. In general: trains that encounter a lit railroad flare are required to stop until it burns out. Fusees made specifically for railroad use can be distinguished from highway fusees by a sharp steel spike at one end, used to embed the fusee upright in a wooden railroad tie.

=== Forestry and firefighting ===
In forestry and firefighting, fusees are sometimes used in wildfire suppression and in the ignition of controlled burns. They ignite at 191 °C (376 °F) and burn as hot as 1,600 °C (2,910 °F).

=== Protests ===
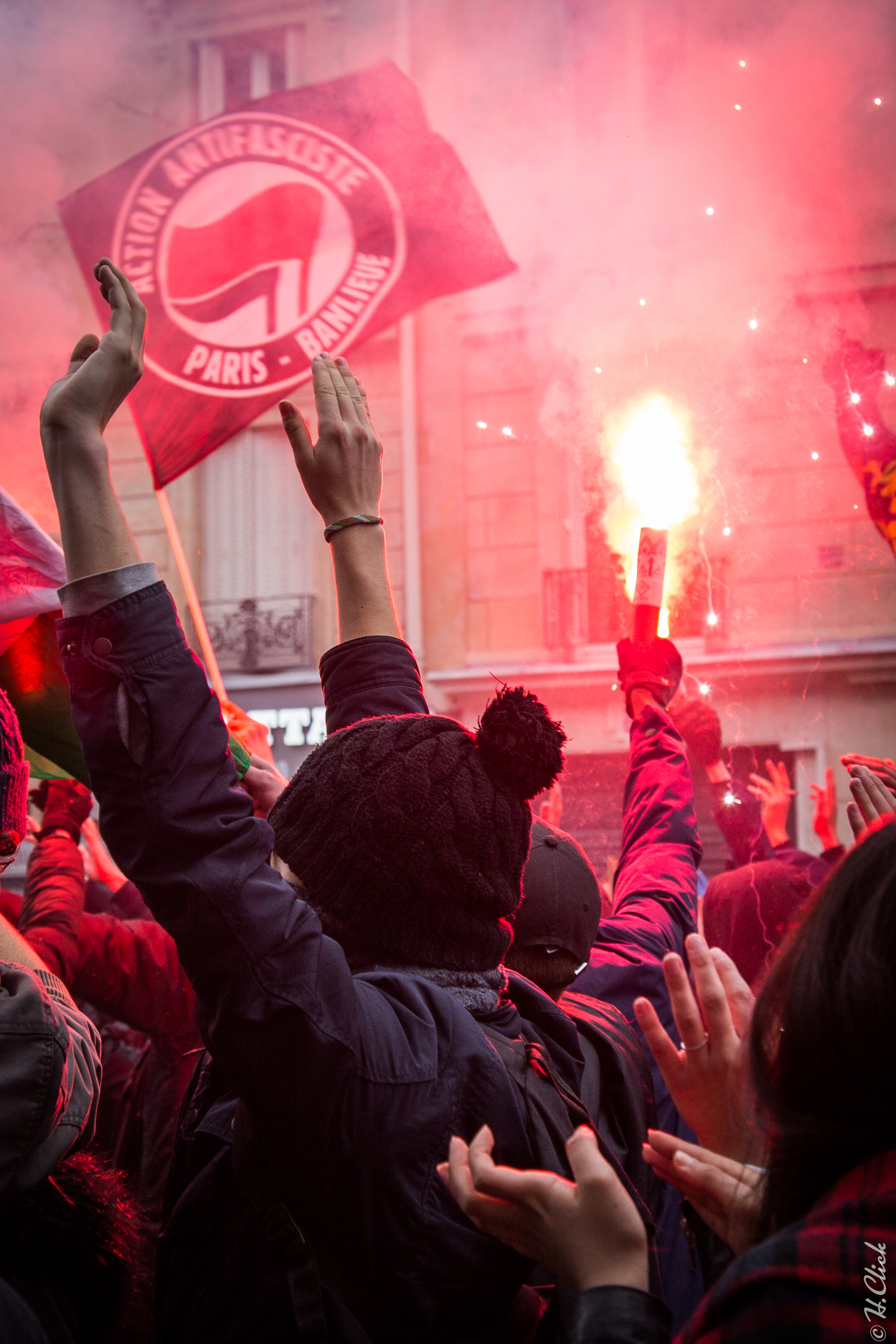
Antifa protestors using flares

Flares are used by law enforcement agencies such as the United States National Guard, and police as a form of riot control. This practice dates back to at least the 1940s where they are mentioned as being "useful in night operations". Handheld flares are also counter used by protestors at demonstrations.

== Military use ==
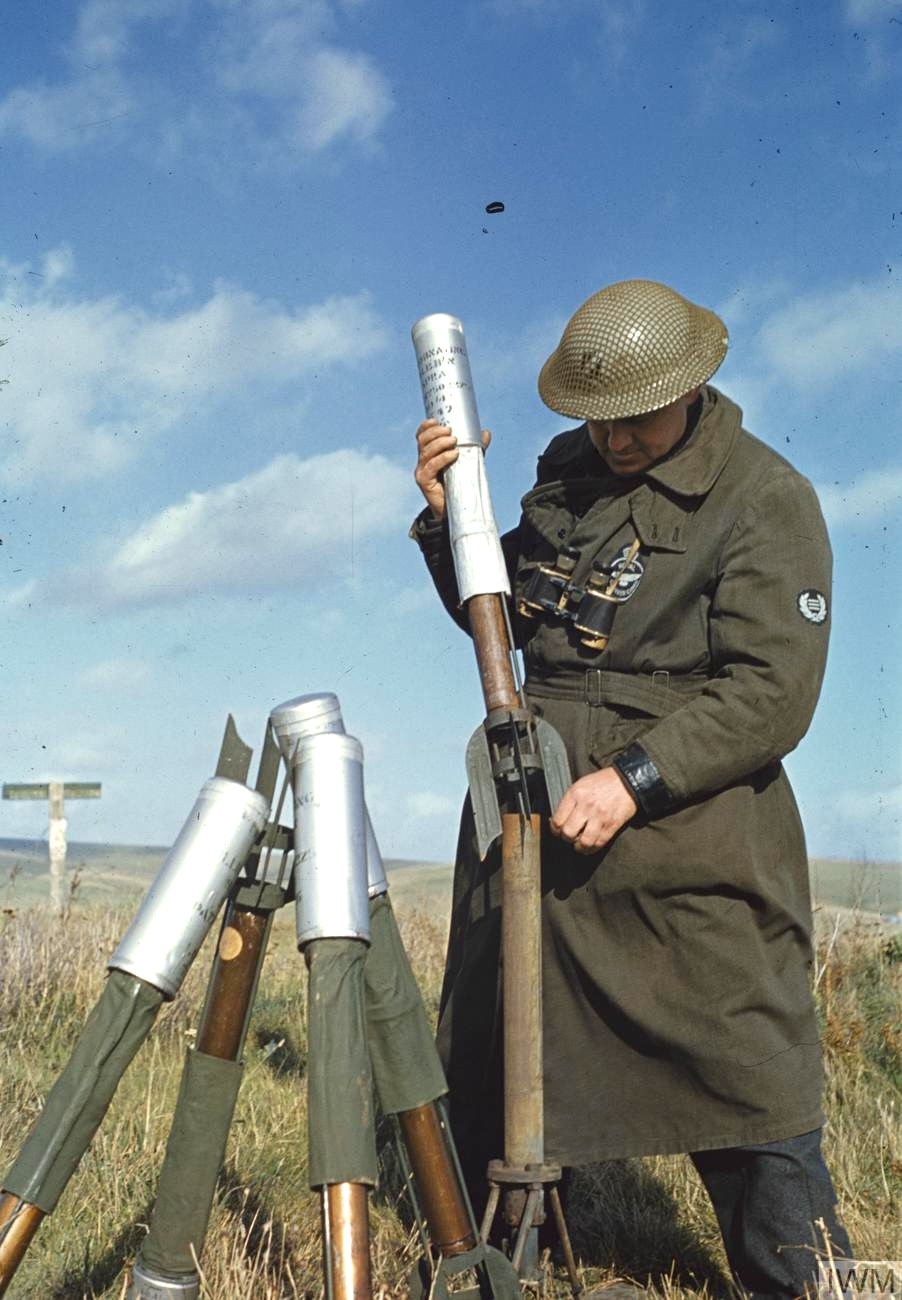
A member of the Royal Observer Corps preparing Snowflake Rocket Flares, 1943

=== Maritime signal flare ===
In 1859, Martha Coston patented the Coston flare based on early work by her deceased husband Benjamin Franklin Coston.

=== Illumination ===
In 1922, a "landing flare" was an aerial candle attached to a parachute and used for landing an airplane in the dark. The flare burned for less than four minutes and the candlepower was about 40,000 lumens. During World War II, the U.S. Navy tested underwater flares for use in detecting submarines.

=== Countermeasure ===
A special variety of flares is used in military aircraft as a defensive countermeasure against heat-seeking missiles. These flares are usually discharged individually or in salvos by the pilot or automatically by tail-warning devices and are accompanied by vigorous evasive maneuvering. Since they are intended to deceive infrared missiles, these flares burn at temperatures of thousands of degrees, incandescing in the visible spectrum as well.

=== Tripflares ===
Flares connected to tripwires are used to guard an area against infiltration. The flare begins burning when the tripwire is triggered, providing both alarm and illumination.

== Regulation ==
Under the UN hazard number system, pyrotechnic flares are designated class 1.4 explosives.

Several U.S. states, including California and Massachusetts, have begun regulating levels of potassium perchlorate, which can be unsafe at certain levels in drinking water. Contaminated drinking water can lead to such symptoms as gastric irritation, nausea, vomiting, fever, skin rashes, and even fatal aplastic anemia (a reduction in all types of blood cells).

== Chemistry ==
Flares produce their light through the combustion of a pyrotechnic composition. The ingredients are varied, but often based on strontium nitrate, potassium nitrate, or potassium perchlorate, mixed with a fuel such as charcoal, sulfur, sawdust, aluminium, magnesium, or a suitable polymeric resin. Flares may be colored by the inclusion of pyrotechnic colorants. Calcium flares are used underwater to illuminate submerged objects.

=== Perchlorate flare health issues ===
Many in-service colored signal flares and spectrally balanced decoy flares contain perchlorate oxidizers. Perchlorate, a type of salt in its solid form, dissolves and moves rapidly in groundwater and surface water. Even in low concentrations in drinking water supplies, perchlorate is known to inhibit the uptake of iodine by the thyroid gland. While there are currently no US federal drinking water standards for perchlorate, some states have established public health goals or action levels, and some are in the process of establishing state maximum contaminant levels. For example, the US Environmental Protection Agency has studied the impacts of perchlorate on the environment as well as drinking water. California has also issued guidance regarding perchlorate use.

US courts have taken action regarding the use of perchlorate in manufacturing pyrotechnic devices such as flares. For example, in 2003, a federal district court in California found that the Comprehensive Environmental Response, Compensation and Liability Act (CERCLA) applied because perchlorate is ignitable and therefore a "characteristic" hazardous waste. Flares manufactured in the United States no longer use potassium perchlorate as an oxidizer and do not contain aluminium or magnesium.

== See also ==
- Blue light (pyrotechnic signal) – Early pyrotechnic signal
- Flare gun – Firearm that launches flares
- Magnesium torch – Bright light source made from magnesium, which burns underwater
- Shell (projectile) – Payload-carrying projectile
- Glow stick – Light source which produces no spark or flame, and no to negligible heat
