= Blue Jacket (clipper) =

Clipper ship, constructed 1854

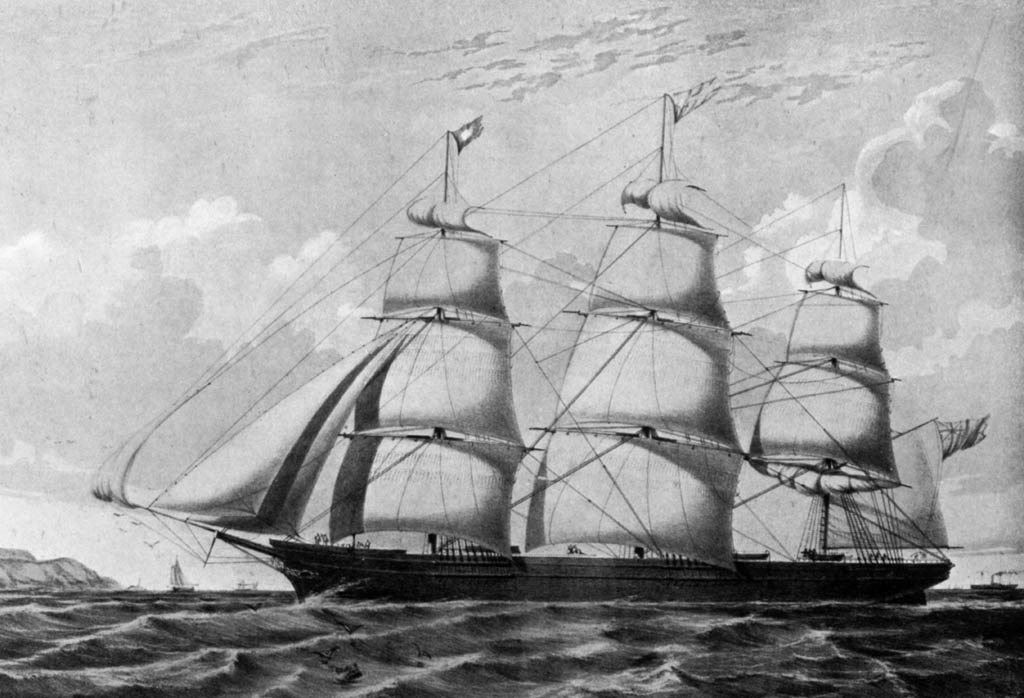

History

United States
- Owner: Seccomb & Taylor, Boston; Sold to John Frost for his Fox Line of Australian packets later that year.
- Builder: Robert E. Jackson, East Boston, MA
- Launched: August 7, 1854 or Aug. 27, 1854
- Fate: Caught fire and sank March 5, 1869

General characteristics
- Class & type: Medium clipper
- Tons burthen: 1790 tons
- Length: 220 ft (67 m). ; 235 ft (72 m). LOA
- Beam: 41 ft 2 in (12.55 m), or 41 ft. 6 in.
- Draft: 24 ft (7.3 m).
- Notes: 2 decks

Blue Jacket was an 1854 medium clipper well known for the lavish decoration of its staterooms and saloon. She served in the Liverpool and Australia trades. The ship was named after the blue jackets, a traditional name for sailors in the US and British navies.

== Figurehead ==
The figurehead was "a man from the waist up, in old sailor's costume, a blue jacket with yellow buttons, the jacket open in the front, no waistcoat, loose shirt, and a large knotted handkerchief round the neck."

== Construction ==
Blue Jacket had a sharp bow, and a full midship section designed for stowing a large cargo. Lubbock describes this fuller style of hull, which created an appearance of "strength and power" rather than "grace and beauty," as being characteristic of ships designed by Donald McKay.

The frame of Blue Jacket was white oak, with planking and ceiling of hard pine. She was diagonally braced with iron, and square-fastened throughout. The interior finish work was quite elegant, according to a contemporary description in the U.S. Nautical Magazine:

Her cabins, of which she has two, are under a poop deck. The saloon is 40 feet long by 14 wide, painted white, and ornamented with papier maché gilt work; in the centre of each panel is a representation of flowers, fruit and game. This saloon contains 20 state-rooms, ventilated and finished in a superior manner; the furniture, carpets, and drapery in each, being different. Each room has a square window on its side, and deck lights above. The after, or ladies' cabin, is 30 feet long by 13 wide, and contains eight state-rooms and a bath-room. This cabin is a miniature palace. It is wainscoted with mahogany, the entablatures are of rosewood, and the pillars of satinwood. The panels are ornamented with flowers, surrounded by gilt scroll work.

== Voyages ==
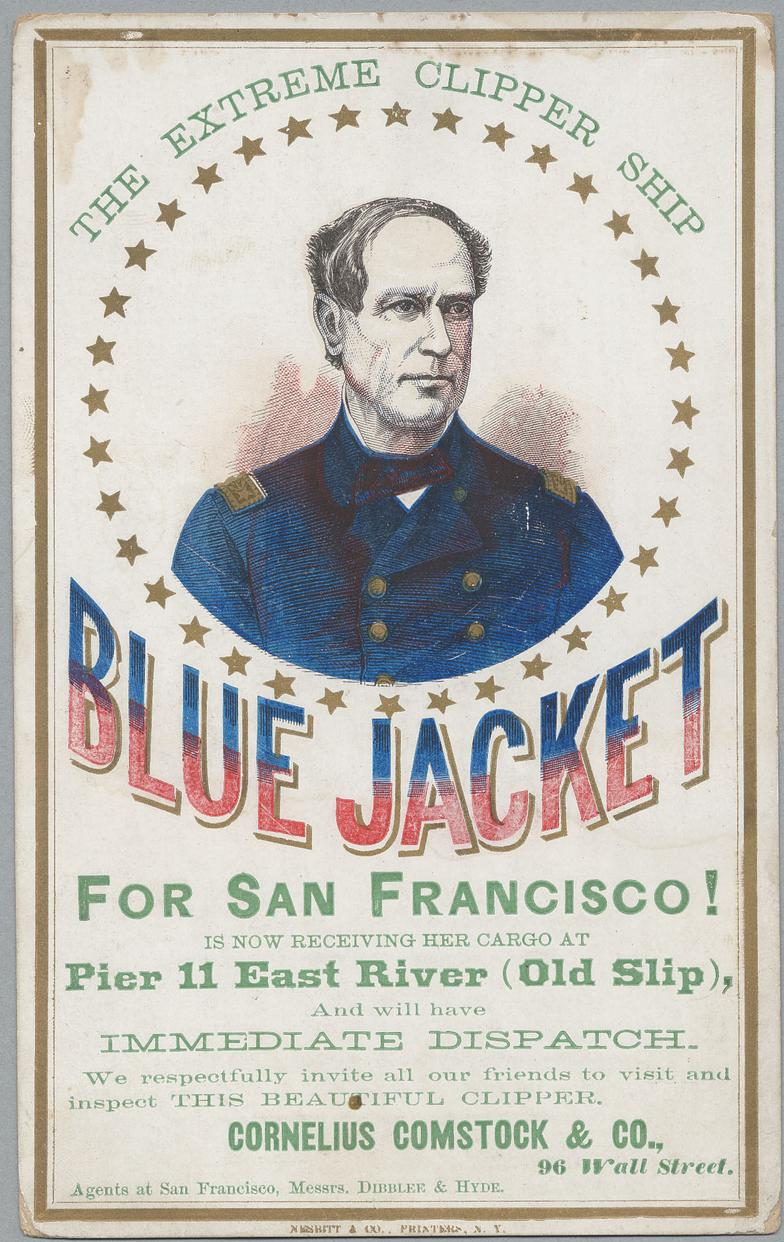
Sailing card for Blue Jacket

The Blue Jacket was chartered by the White Star Line in 1854.

- Boston to Liverpool
  - 12 days, 10 hours, Captain Eldridge, 1854
- Liverpool to Melbourne
  - 68/69 days, Captain Underwood, 1855
- Madras to London
  - 92 days, 1855
- Lyttelton, NZ to London
  - 63 days, Captain James White, 1863
- San Francisco to Honolulu
  - 14 days, Capt. Dillingham, 1865–1866, to load whale oil for New Bedford

== Loss of the ship ==
Blue Jacket left Lyttelton, New Zealand, with a general cargo that included flax. On March 5, 1869, off the Falkland Islands, the flax caught fire. Four days later, on March 9, the ship was abandoned.

The passengers and crew of the burning vessel were divided into three boats, one cutter and two lifeboats. The three boats separated after two days. There is no record of the two lifeboats, but on March 16, the barque Pyrmont of Hamburg rescued the crew on board the cutter. There were nine survivors, who managed to guard £15,000 worth of gold from the ship.

== Recovery of her figurehead ==
After the loss of the ship, "the figurehead of the Blue Jacket was found washed up on the shore of the Rottnest Island, off Fremantle, Western Australia".

The figurehead washed ashore 21 months later, roughly 6,000 miles (9,700 km) from the location where Blue Jacket burned – 53°S 60°W. The average speed of drift for the figurehead was calculated to be 6½ miles per day.

== See also ==
- List of clipper ships
