= Alma–Marceau station =

Metro station in Paris, France

Alma–Marceau
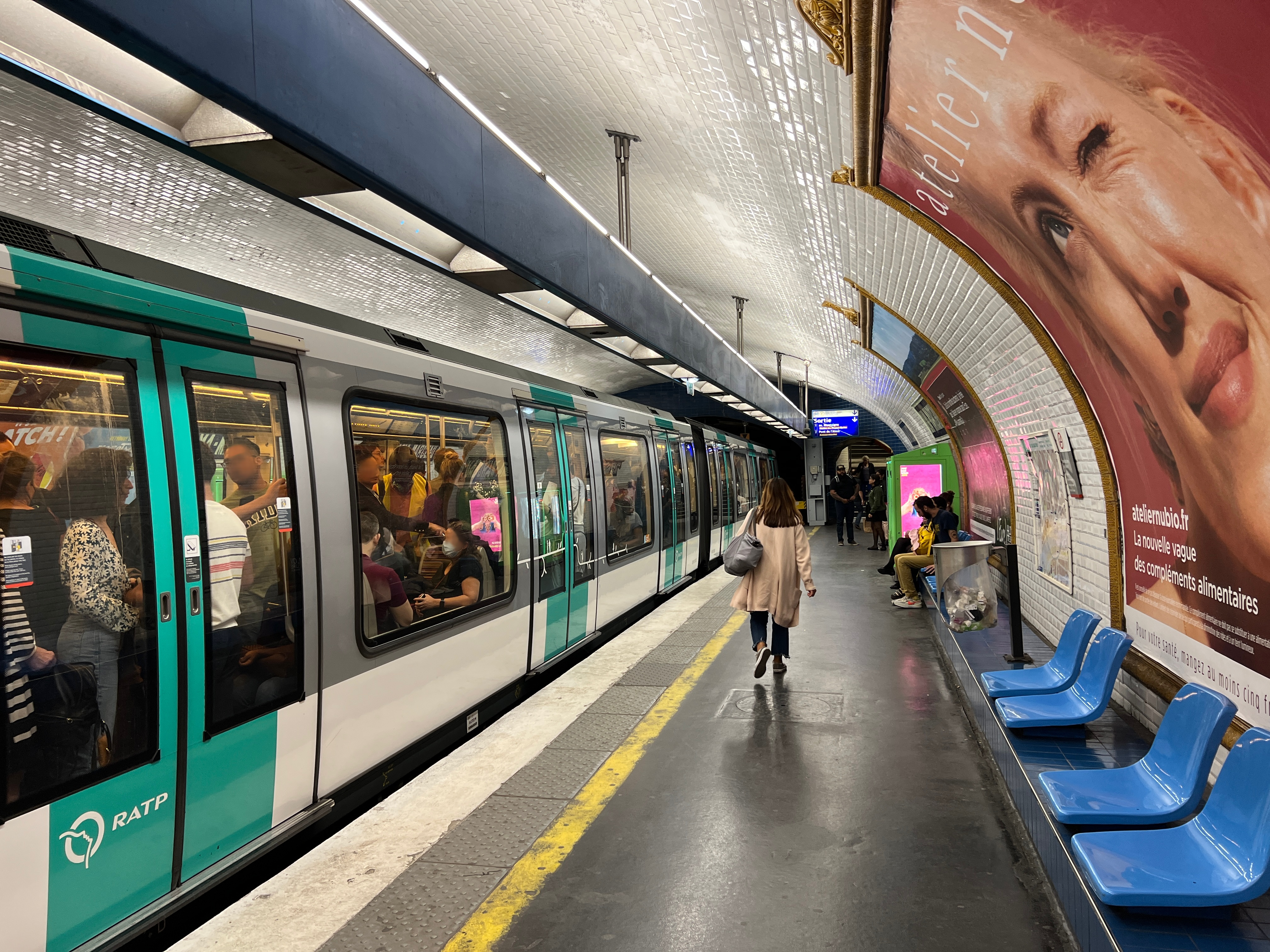

General information
- Location: 8th arrondissement of Paris; Île-de-France; France
- Coordinates: 48°51′54″N 2°18′01″E
- System: Paris Metro station
- Owner: RATP
- Operator: RATP

Other information
- Fare zone: 1

History
- Opened: 27 May 1923

Services
Preceding station	Paris Metro	Following station
Iéna towards Pont de Sèvres	Line 9	Franklin D. Roosevelt towards Mairie de Montreuil
Location
- Location within Paris

Alma–Marceau (French pronunciation: [alma maʁso]) is a station on Line 9 of the Paris Metro, named after the Pont de l'Alma (Alma Bridge) and the Avenue Marceau.

== History ==
The station opened on 27 May 1923 with the extension of the line from Trocadéro to Saint-Augustin.

The Battle of the Alma was a Franco-British victory against the Russians in the Crimean War in 1854. General François Séverin Marceau (1769–1796) fought the War in the Vendée during the French Revolution.

As was the case of a third of the stations in the network between 1974 and 1984, its platforms were modernised in the Andreu-Motte style, in this case in a shade of blue that was not renewed. As part of the RATP's Metro Renewal programme, the station's corridors were opened, after renovation, on 15 March 2002.

== Passenger services ==
=== Access ===
The station has three accesses equipped with Dervaux-type balustrades:

- Access 1 - Avenue Montaigne - Théâtre des Champs-Élysées, consisting of a fixed staircase decorated with two Dervaux lampposts (a rare case for the network which often uses only one signal per entrance), leading to the right of no. 7 Place de l'Alma, at the corner with Avenue Montaigne and Avenue George-V;
- Access 2 - Pont de l'Alma, Bateaux mouches; Musée du Quai Branly - Jacques-Chirac, also consisting of a fixed staircase with two Dervaux masts, facing No. 1 Place de l'Alma, at the corner with Avenue de New-York. It gives direct access to Diana Square;
- Access 3 - Avenue du Président-Wilson - Musée d'Art moderne, Palais de Tokyo, consisting of a fixed staircase doubled by an escalator going up and equipped with a Dervaux totem, located to the right of no. 4 in this avenue.

=== Station layout ===
Street Level

B1	Mezzanine

Line 9 platforms	Side platform, doors will open on the right
Line 9 platforms	Westbound	← toward Pont de Sèvres (Iéna)
Line 9 platforms	Eastbound	toward Mairie de Montreuil (Franklin D. Roosevelt) →
Line 9 platforms	Side platform, doors will open on the right

=== Platforms ===
Alma - Marceau is a standard station. It has two platforms separated by the metro tracks and the vault is elliptical. The decoration is in the Andreu-Motte style with two blue light canopies, benches, tunnel exits, and most of the corridor openings treated in flat blue tiles and Motte seats of the same colour. These fittings are combined with the bevelled white ceramic tiles that cover the walls, the vault, and a corridor threshold on the platform towards Pont de Sèvres. The advertising frames are made of honey-coloured earthenware, and the name of the station is also in earthenware in the style of the original CMP. The station is distinguished, however, by the lower part of its walls, which is vertical and not elliptical, its immediate proximity to the river Seine requiring a reinforced construction resulting in a special profile.

It is one of the few platforms to still present the Andreu-Motte style in its entirety.

=== Other connections ===
The station is connected to the Pont de l'Alma station (on line C of the RER), located on the other side of the Pont de l'Alma. This connection is shown on the RATP map of metro line 9, with a walking symbol. (remote connection).

In addition, it is served by lines 42, 63, 72, 80 and 92 of the RATP bus network.

== Places of interest ==
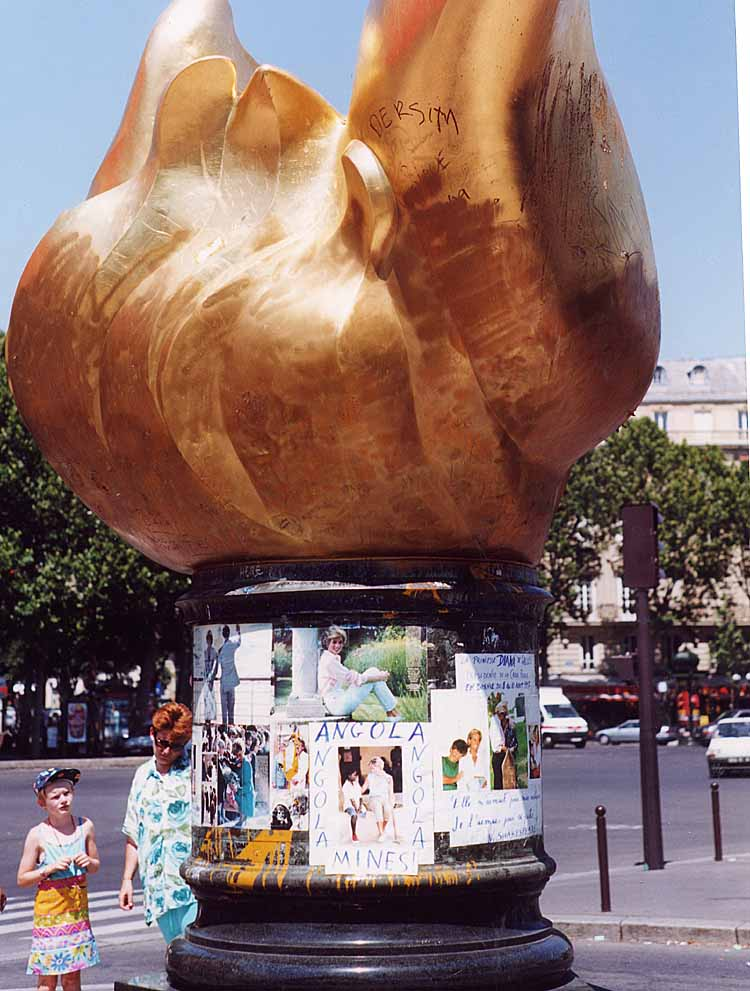
The Flame of Liberty, a counterpart to the flame of the Statue of Liberty, was placed in the Place d'Alma in 1987. The site is officially named Place Diana since 2019.

- Diana, Princess of Wales died as a result of a car crash in the tunnel under the Pont de l'Alma in 1997. The square east of the metro entrance is officially named Place Diana, in her memory.
- The Zouave, a sculpture of a Zouave by Georges Diebolt, is attached to the upstream side of the Pont de l'Alma. Parisians measure the depth of floods by noting the proportion of the statue that is under water.
- Near the station are the cabaret of the Crazy Horse Saloon and the Museum of Modern Art of the City of Paris in the Palais de Tokyo.
- The Place d'Alma is at the western end of the Cours Albert Ier et Cours La Reine, which contain some statues commemorating characters symbolising the relations between France and other countries.
- The starting point of visits to the Paris sewers in the vicinity of the Eiffel Tower is on the left bank of the Seine.

== Gallery ==
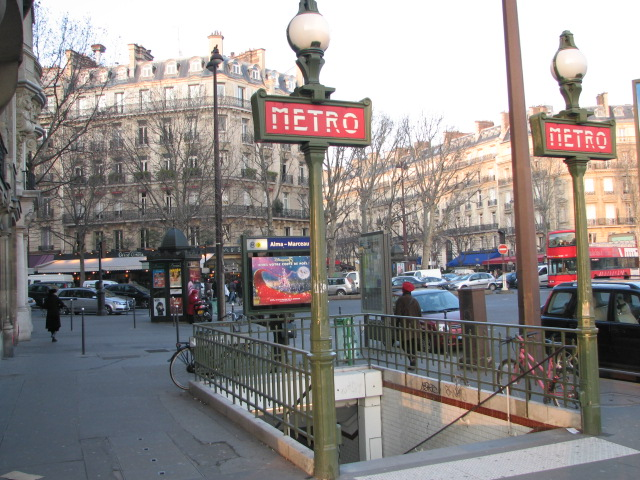
Street-level entrance at Alma–Marceau, towards Place Diana
