= St. Jago Cathedral Prep =

St. Jago Cathedral Preparatory School

Location
- Spanish Town, St. Catherine; Jamaica; 17°59′56″N 76°57′22″W

Information
- Type: Private School
- Motto: "For Life We Learn"
- Religious affiliation: Anglican
- Established: 1957
- Chairman: Collin D. Reid
- Principal: Nadia Guy
- Staff: approx. 20
- Enrollment: approx. 350
- Colours: Green & gold
- Nickname: Jago Prep
- Symbol: Torch

St. Jago Prep School is a co-edueducational school. It is the junior version of St Jago High School.

== Principals ==
Name	Year
Martha Gordon	1988
Paulette Chedda	1999–2007
Andrea Baugh	2007–2022
Nadia Guy	2022–present
