= Water torch =

Water torch can mean:

- Water torch, an oxyhydrogen torch whose gas supply is generated immediately by electrolysis of water
- The water plant Typha latifolia, because its stems when soaked in oil make good burning torches

== Distinguish from ==
- A diver's underwater torch (flashlight) (or a magnesium torch in the 1950s and 1960s).
- An oxy-gas torch designed to be used underwater.
