= John Rutledge (disambiguation) =

John Rutledge may refer to:

- John Rutledge (1739–1800), Governor of South Carolina and second Chief Justice of the U.S. Supreme Court
- John Rutledge Jr. (1766–1819), U.S. Representative from South Carolina
- John Rutledge (a.k.a. Eggsy), a Welsh comedian in the hop-hop comedy group Goldie Lookin Chain
- John Rutledge, a ship sunk by an iceberg in 1856 with the loss of about 140 lives
