= John Rutledge (1851 ship) =

19th-century full-rigged sailing ship

- John Rutledge

History

United States
- Name: John Rutledge
- Owner: William Ravenel
- Builder: J. J. Abrahams
- Launched: August 1851
- In service: October 1851
- Out of service: February 20, 1856
- Home port: Charleston, South Carolina
- Fate: Collided with iceberg and sank

General characteristics
- Tonnage: 1,008 tons burthen
- Length: 175 feet (53 m)
- Beam: 37 feet (11 m)
- Propulsion: Sails
- Sail plan: Full-rigged ship, ~25,000 square feet (2,300 m^{2}) sail area

John Rutledge was a full-rigged ship built in Baltimore, Maryland and launched in August 1851. She struck an iceberg and sank on February 20, 1856 with the loss of all but one of those on board.

== Description ==
John Rutledge was 175 feet (53 m) long, with a beam of 37 feet (11 m). She was assessed at 1,008 tons burthen. She was a full-rigged ship with a sail area of about 25,000 square feet (2,300 m^{2}).

== History ==
John Rutledge was built at Baltimore, Maryland 1851 for William Ravenel of Charleston, South Carolina. She was not named for the former Governor of South Carolina John Rutledge, but a navy captain of the same name. She was launched in August 1851. Her port of registry was Charleston. She is first recorded as arriving at Baltimore on October 18, 1851, being described as "new". Her first captain was E. C. Wambersie.

John Rutledge sailed from Liverpool, United Kingdom on February 20 for Charleston. She was off Charleston on March 27, 1852, having taken 35 days from Liverpool. Having made another voyage, she arrived at Charleston on July 20. She arrived at Charleston on November 5. John Rutledge was at Philadelphia, Pennsylvania for loading on December 14, 1852. At some point after September 1852, she was sold to a New York shipping concern, then resold to an investment group.

John Rutledge sailed from Liverpool for Philadelphia on January 16, 1853. She sailed from New York on May 19, 1853, bound for Antwerp, Belgium. She had arrived by July 22. She arrived at New York from Antwerp on September 13, bringing 255 passengers. She made another voyage to Liverpool before the year was out, arriving at Crookhaven, County Cork, United Kingdom on December 16. Captain Sands was appointed during 1853.

By 1854, John Rutledge was owned by Tapscott's Line. She was advertised as sailing from Liverpool on January 12, 1854. She sailed on January 20. She arrived at New York in March. On April 28, John Rutledge met with the American barque Dirigo in the Atlantic Ocean (47°30′N 38°30′W). John Rutledge supplied Dirigio with provisions; Dirigio had rescued more than 270 people from the sinking American ship Black Hawk eight days previous. John Rutledge was on a voyage from New York to Liverpool. She arrived on May 6. Advertised as sailing on May 18, she sailed for New York on May 31. On June 9 she was at 45°27′N 26°08′W. She did not sail, as on September 3, there was a revolt amongst her crew. Assistance was sought from the shore; five crew members were put in irons and conveyed ashore. They were committed for trial the next day. John Rutledge sailed on September 4, carrying 130 passengers. On arrival at Liverpool on October 5, she ran aground on the East Hoyle Bank, in Liverpool Bay. Thirty bales of cotton were thrown overboard. Some Mersey flats were sent to assist in lightening her. Her passengers and crew were landed. She was refloated the next day. She sailed from Liverpool for New York on December 7.

In February 1855, John Rutledge was reported to be on her beam ends by the American ship Henry Nasmith, which was on a voyage from New Orleans, Louisiana to New York. She was reported to have been righted when Henry Naismith left her. John Rutledge departed from New York on March 9. The next day, her cargo shifted, throwing her on to her beam ends. She lost some sails and others were split. She also lost her starboard anchor. Two crew were lost overboard. On March 12, she was sighted in the Atlantic Ocean by the American ship John Haven. John Rutledge had no sails set and a list to starboard. She made no signal that she required assistance. She arrived at Liverpool on April 6. Having sailed from Liverpool on May 9, she arrived at New York in mid-June. She sailed from New York for Liverpool on August 2. Having sailed from Liverpool to New York, she arrived back at Liverpool on December 25, 1855. Amongst her cargo was 8,433 bushels of wheat, 12,738 bushels of corn, 977 bags of oats and 177 bales of cotton.

== Loss ==
Nye's lifeboat

On January 3, 1856, a labourer was killed when a bar of iron fell on him whilst John Rutledge was being loaded in Waterloo Dock, Liverpool. She sailed for New York on January 16. During the voyage a passenger and crew member were lost overboard. On February 18, she passed an iceberg in the Grand Banks of Newfoundland (45°34′N 46°56′W). Between 9 and 10 a.m. on February 20, John Rutledge collided with an iceberg, springing a plank in her bow. She was abandoned at 6 p.m. Most of the passengers and all of the crew took to five boats, although 30 to 35 passengers were left aboard the ship and were drowned when she foundered. One boat contained thirteen people. Only one of them survived to be rescued on February 29 by the American ship Germania, which was on a voyage from Havre de Grâce, Seine-Inférieure, France to New York. The survivor, Thomas W. Nye, a 19-year old crew member, of New Bedford, Massachusetts, was frostbitten below his knees. This was successfully treated with poultices of bread and milk; Germania was carrying a number of cattle, which supplied the milk. No trace was found of the other four boats. The four deceased in Nye's boat were buried at sea by members of Germania's crew. Having sailed from New York on board the steamship Potomska, Nye arrived home at New Bedford on April 3. He was taken to his father's house in Fairhaven, Massachusetts to continue his recuperation. Nye stated that the first person in the boat died on February 23, followed by another the next day. On that day, they sighted a brig, which did not see their signal of distress and sailed on. Another person had died by the fifth day in the boat. On that day, everyone else started to drink seawater, despite his warning against it. They had all died within two days. He was able to hydrate a little by eating some snow which fell, and ice which formed on the boat. Nye made a distress signal from an oar, shirt and handkerchief and hoisted it. He was rescued two days later. In mid-April, Nye was reported to be making a good recovery.

Accounts vary as to the number of people on board John Rutledge when she left Liverpool. Numbers given are 120 passengers and sixteen crew (total 136),, 120 passengers and 26 crew (total 146), 123 passengers and 23 crew (total 146), and 123 passengers and 22 crew (total 145).

The loss of the John Rutledge led to calls from the U.S. Nautical Magazine and Naval Journal to call for legislation to required ships built in the United States to have watertight compartments, despite resistance from shipowners and insurance underwriters.
