= Lampadephoria =

Torch race in classical Athens

Lampadephoria (Λαμπαδηφορία) and Lampadedromia (Λαμπαδηδρομία), or simply Lampas (Λαμπάς), was an ancient Greek type of torch race. It was also called λαμπαδοῦχος ἀγών (torch-bearer competition), λαμπαδοῦχος δρόμος (torch-bearer race) and ἑορτὴ λαμπάδος (torch festival).

The race was run usually on foot, but sometimes it was also on horses by ephebi (a Greek youth entering manhood). The torches were of two kinds—one a sort of candlestick and the other one of a more conventional kind. There were different methods of the race.

The first was a Relay race. Runners (λαμπαδισταί or λαμποδηφόροι), posted at intervals, the first in each line who receives the torch, or takes it from the altar, running at his best speed and handing it to the second in his own line, and the second to the third, until the last in the line is reached, who runs with it up to the appointed spot. The winner was the first team to pass the torch over the finish line. If a torch went out the team would lose the race.

In the second type the competition was individual, there was no handing of the torch from one to another, but several torch-bearers started and the first who reached the goal with his torch alight won.
