= Martha Coston =

American inventor of Coston flare

Martha Jane Coston
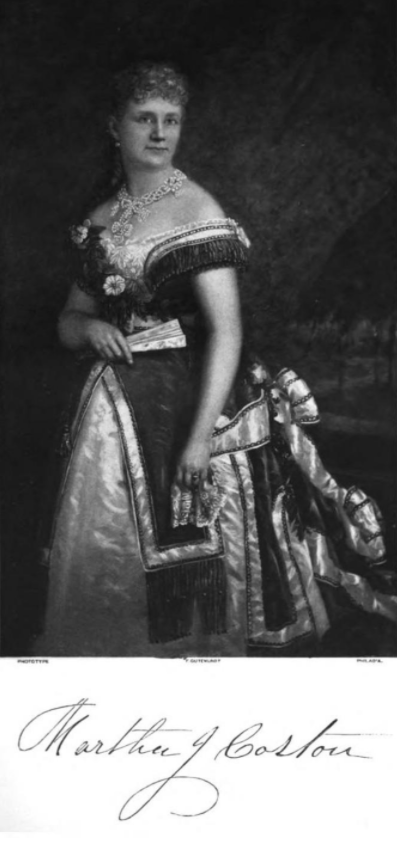
- Martha Coston
- Born: December 12, 1826; Baltimore, Maryland, U.S.
- Died: July 9, 1904 (aged 77)
- Resting place: Laurel Hill Cemetery, Philadelphia, Pennsylvania, U.S.
- Occupation: Owner of the Coston Signal Company

Martha Jane Coston (December 12, 1826 – July 9, 1904) was an American inventor and businesswoman who invented the Coston flare, a device for signaling at sea, and the owner of the Coston Manufacturing Company.

== Early life ==
Martha Jane Coston was an American inventor, entrepreneur, and manufacturer best known for developing the Coston night signaling flare system. This system was a color-based method of communication used at sea. She was born in Baltimore, Maryland, and moved with her family to Philadelphia while still a child. As a teenager, she married Benjamin Franklin Coston, an inventor who later worked with the United States Navy on scientific and military projects. After his death in 1848, Martha Coston was left a widow with children and faced both personal and financial hardship.

While going through her husband’s papers after his death, she found notes related to a naval signaling system. These notes gave her a starting point, but they were not a finished invention. The system still needed major development, testing, and practical improvement before it could be used effectively. Coston took on that work herself and eventually transformed the idea into a functioning maritime signaling technology.

== Flare design and business ==
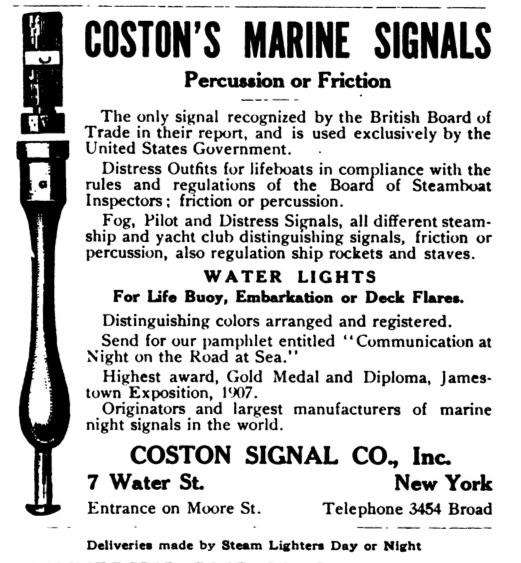
1913 advertisement for Coston flares.

The years following Benjamin Coston's death were filled with more tragedy for Martha Coston; two of her children and her mother died in the next two years, leaving her in poor condition emotionally as well as in difficult financial straits. While searching through her husband's papers, she discovered the notes he had written on night signaling at the Navy Yard. Her husband's incomplete work needed substantial additional effort before it could be turned into a practical signaling system.

For nearly ten years, Martha Coston worked to develop a system of flare signaling based on her husband's earlier work. With a limited knowledge of chemistry and pyrotechnics, she relied on the advice of hired chemists and fireworks experts, with mixed results. A breakthrough came in 1858, while she was witnessing the fireworks display in New York City celebrating the completion of the transatlantic telegraph cable; she realized that her system needed a bright blue flare, along with the red and white she had already developed. she established the Coston Manufacturing Company to manufacture the signal flares, and entered into a business relationship with a pyrotechnics developer to provide the necessary blue color.

On April 5, 1859, she was granted U.S. Patent number 23,536 for a pyrotechnic night signal and code system. (The patent was granted to her as administratrix for her deceased husband, who is named as inventor.) Using different combinations of colors, it enabled ships to signal to one another, and to signal to shore. Captain C.S. McCauley of the U.S. Navy recommended the use of her flares to Secretary of the Navy Isaac Toucey in 1859. After extended testing, which demonstrated the effectiveness of the system, the U.S. Navy ordered an initial set of 300 flares, and later placed an order for $6000 worth of the flares.

== International successes and the Civil War ==
Coston then obtained patents in England, France, Italy, Denmark, Sweden, and the Netherlands, and sailed to England to begin marketing her invention there and in other parts of Europe. She remained in Europe until 1861, when she returned to the U.S. on the outbreak of the Civil War. She went directly to Washington, where she petitioned Congress to purchase the patent so that the flares could be used in the approaching conflict. After some delay, Congress passed an act on August 5, 1861, authorizing the U.S. Navy to purchase the patent for $20,000, though less than the $40,000 she had originally demanded.

Coston flares were used extensively by the U.S. Navy during the Civil War; they proved particularly effective in the discovery and capture of Confederate blockade runners during the Union blockade of southern ports. Coston flares also played an important role in coordinating naval operations during the battle of Fort Fisher in North Carolina on January 13–15, 1865.

In 1871, Coston obtained a patent in her own name - Patent No. 115,935, Improvement in Pyrotechnic Night Signals. In addition to working on improvements to the signaling system, she continued to press claims for additional compensation from the U.S. government. Due to wartime inflation, the Coston Manufacturing Company supplied flares to the U.S. Navy at less than cost, and Coston estimated that the government owed her $120,000 in compensation. Although she pursued her claims for over ten years, she was offered only $15,000 additional reimbursement.

== Use of the Coston flare in the United States Life-Saving Service ==
Eventually every station of the United States Life-Saving Service was equipped with Coston flares, which were used to signal ships, warn of dangerous coastal conditions, and summon surfmen and other rescuers to a wreck scene. Many accounts of wrecks and rescues describe the use of the Coston flare, which was instrumental in saving thousands of lives. While Martha Coston died in 1904, her company, later called the Coston Signal Company and the Coston Supply Company, remained in business until at least 1985.

== Legacy ==
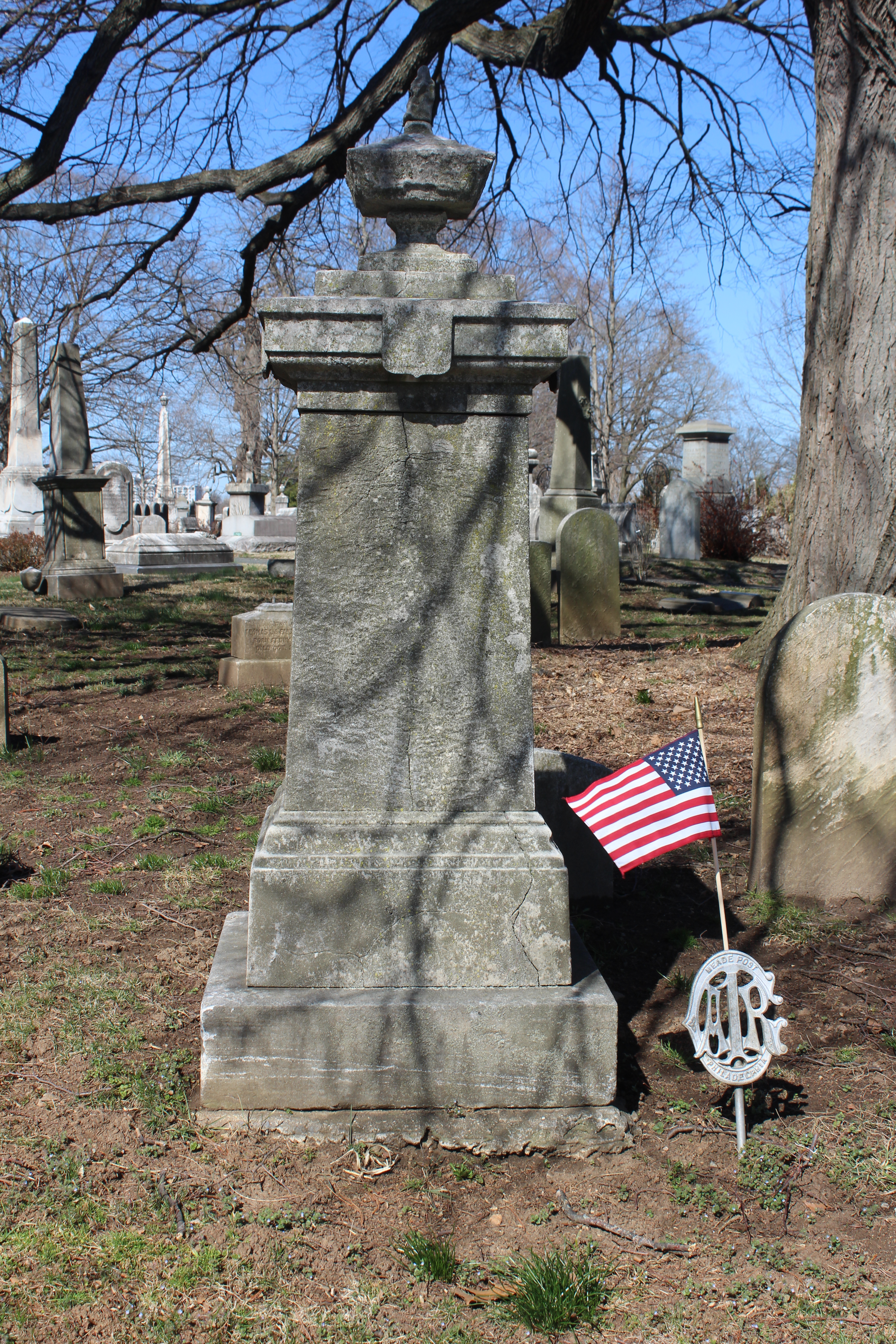
Martha Coston gravestone in Laurel Hill Cemetery

In 2006 Coston was inducted into the National Inventors Hall of Fame.

Coston was interred in Section D, Lot 62 in Laurel Hill Cemetery in Philadelphia.
