= Flame of Liberty =

Monument in Paris, France

Coordinates: 48°51′51″N 2°18′3″E

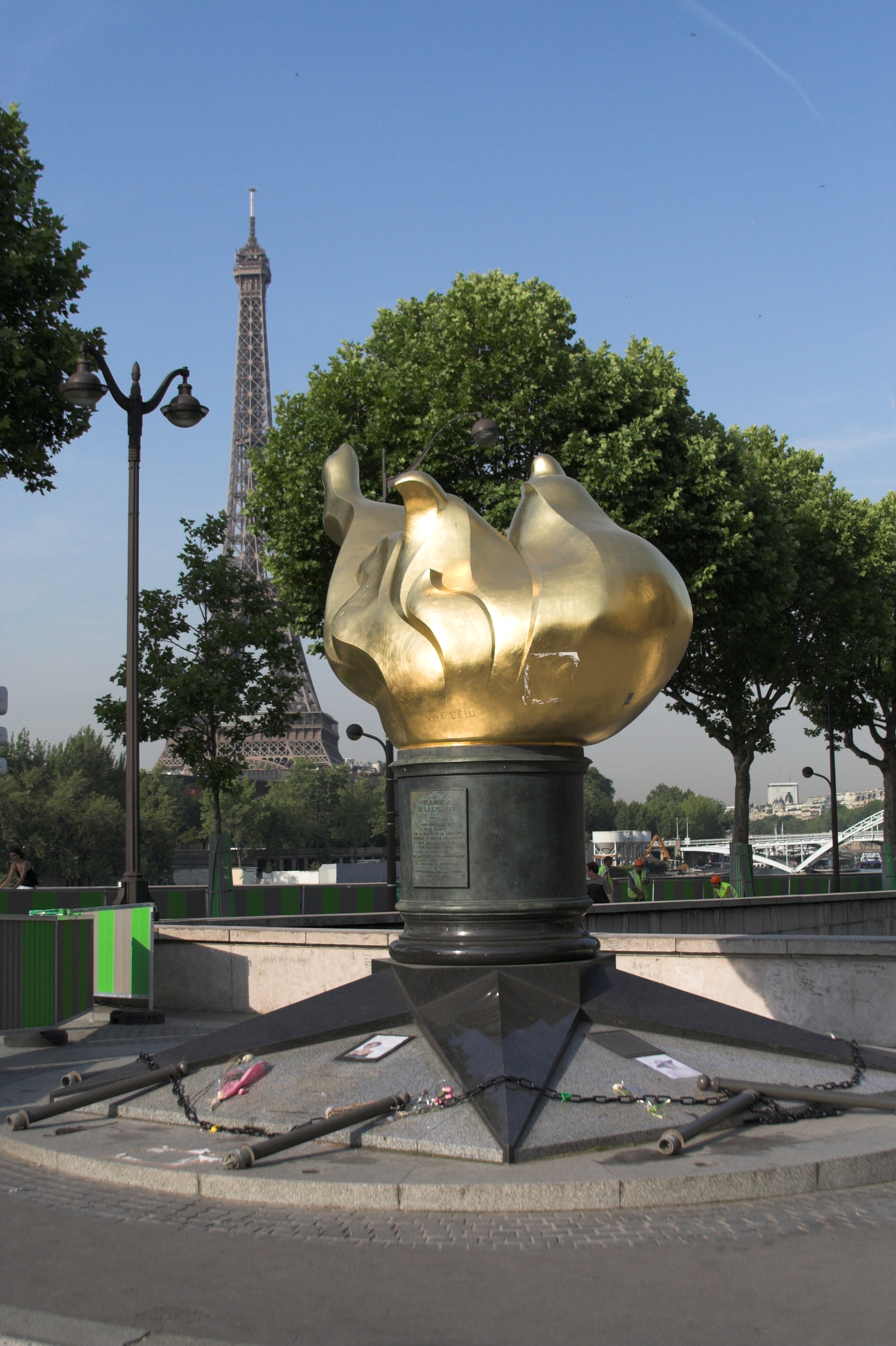
The Flame of Liberty, which was offered to the people of France by donors throughout the world as a symbol of the Franco-American friendship. In the background, the Eiffel Tower.

The Flame of Liberty (Flamme de la Liberté) in Paris is a full-sized, gold-leaf-covered replica of the flame of the torch from New York City's Statue of Liberty (Liberty Enlightening the World). The monument, which measures about 3.5 metres in height, is a sculpture of a flame, executed in gilded copper, supported by a pedestal of gray-and-black marble. It is located near the northern end of the Pont de l'Alma on the Place Diana, in the 16th arrondissement.

== Background ==
It was offered to Paris in 1989 by the International Herald Tribune on behalf of donors who had contributed approximately $400,000 for its fabrication. It represented the culmination of that newspaper's 1987 celebration of its hundredth anniversary of publishing an English-language daily newspaper in Paris. More importantly, the Flame was a token of thanks for the restoration work on the Statue of Liberty accomplished three years earlier by two French businesses that did artisanal work on the project, namely Métalliers Champenois, which did the bronze work, and the Gohard Studios, which applied the gold leaf. While the gift to France was prompted by the centennial of the newspaper, the Flame of Liberty, more broadly, is a lasting symbol of the friendship uniting the two countries, just as the statue itself was when it was given to the United States by France.

This project was overseen by the director of the French craft unions at that time, Jacques Graindorge. He foresaw an installation of the Flame of Liberty in a public square called Place des États-Unis (United States Square) in the 16th arrondissement, but the mayor of Paris at the time, Jacques Chirac, was opposed to it. After a protracted period of negotiations, it was decided that the Flame would be placed in an open area near the intersection of l'Avenue de New-York (New York Avenue) and the Place de l'Alma. The monument was dedicated on 10 May 1989 by Chirac.

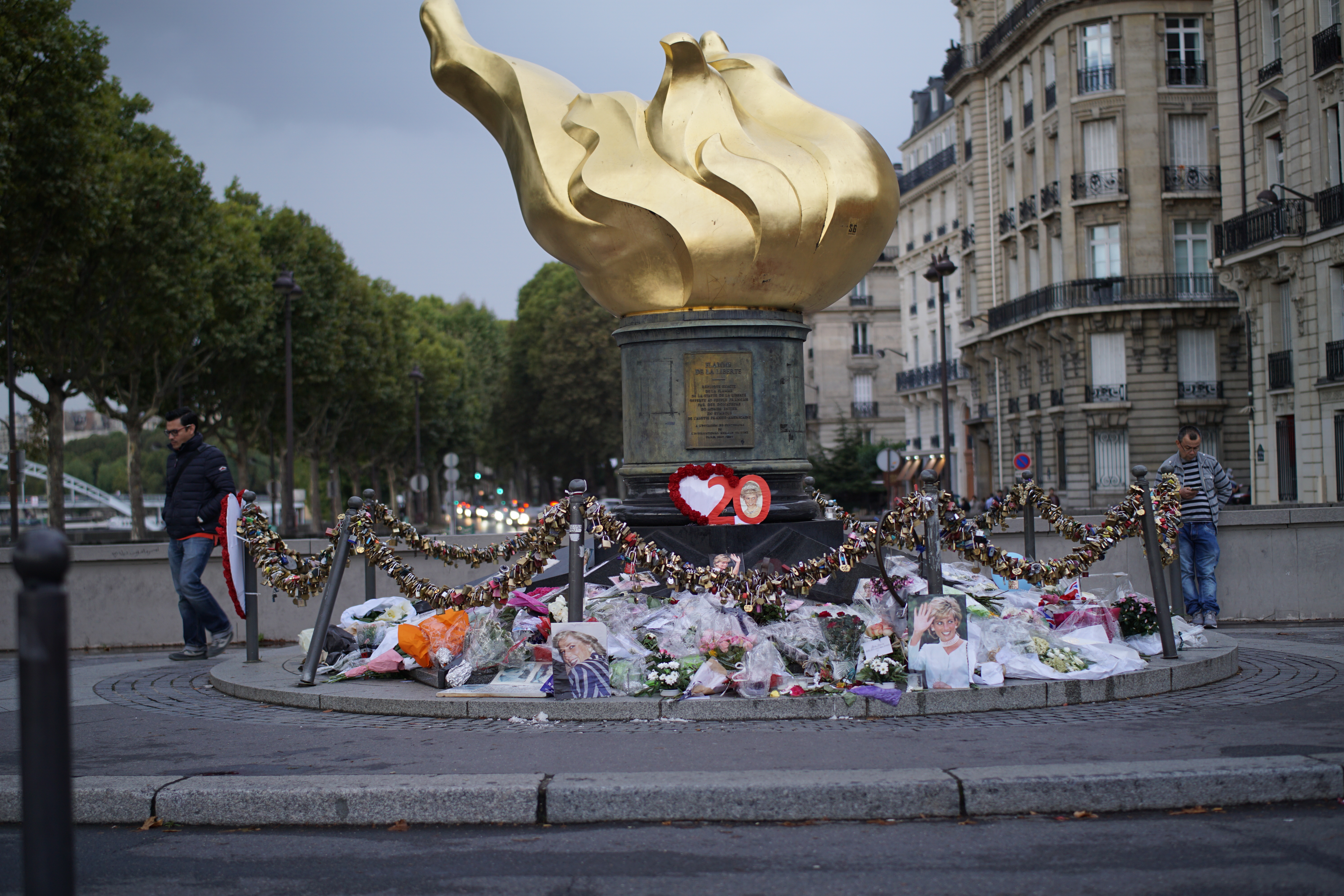
The Flame of Liberty on the 20th anniversary of the death of Diana

On the base of the monument, a commemorative plaque recounts the following story:

"The Flame of Liberty. An exact replica of the Statue of Liberty's flame offered to the people of France by donors throughout the world as a symbol of the Franco-American friendship. On the occasion of the centennial of the International Herald Tribune. Paris 1887–1987."

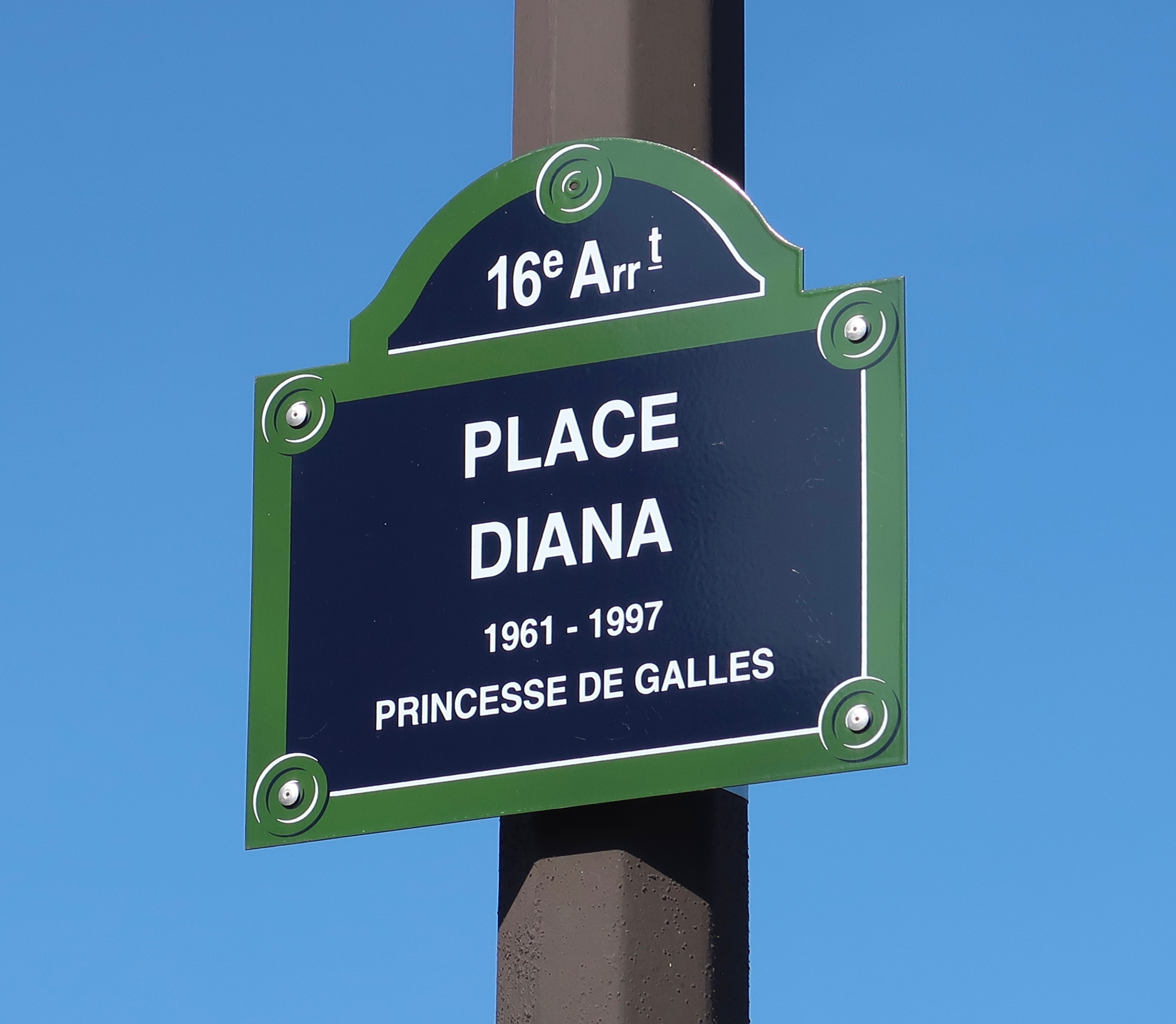
Place Diana street sign

The Flame of Liberty became an unofficial memorial for Diana, Princess of Wales, after her 1997 death in the tunnel beneath the Pont de l'Alma. The flame became an attraction for tourists and followers of Diana, who fly-posted the base with commemorative material. Anthropologist Guy Lesoeurs said, "Most people who come here think this was built for her." In 2019, the site was officially named Place Diana (Diana Square).

The site of the monument is served by the Métro de Paris station Alma-Marceau on Line No. 9 and by the RER commuter rail station, Pont de l'Alma, on its 'C' Line, as well as by buses numbered 42, 63, 72, 80, 92, and the Balabus sightseeing buses.
