= Magnesium torch =

Bright light source made from magnesium, which burns underwater

Jacques Cousteau wields a magnesium torch in each hand while scuba diving in an underwater cave.

A magnesium torch is a bright light source made from magnesium, which can burn underwater and in all weather conditions. They are used for emergency illumination for railroad applications. They were also used from the 1950s to the early 1970s as a light source for scuba diving, and were featured occasionally in television shows. A relay of magnesium torches has been used to transfer the Olympic flame from Greece to the site of the Olympic Games several times since the first occasion at the 1936 Summer Olympics.

== Function ==
Magnesium is highly flammable, burning at a temperature of approximately 3,100 °C (3,370 K; 5,610 °F), and the autoignition temperature of magnesium ribbon is approximately 473 °C (746 K; 883 °F). It produces intense, bright, white light when it burns. Once ignited, magnesium fires are difficult to extinguish, because combustion continues in nitrogen (forming magnesium nitride), carbon dioxide (forming magnesium oxide and carbon), and water (forming magnesium oxide and hydrogen).

=== Structure ===
Details may vary depending on the application. For railway emergency lighting and signalling purposes, the torch may consist of a rolled cardboard structural tube with plastic end covers, one of which may be the ignition device. The fuel is inside and exposed by removing the top end cap. This type of construction may be unsuitable for underwater use.

== Uses ==
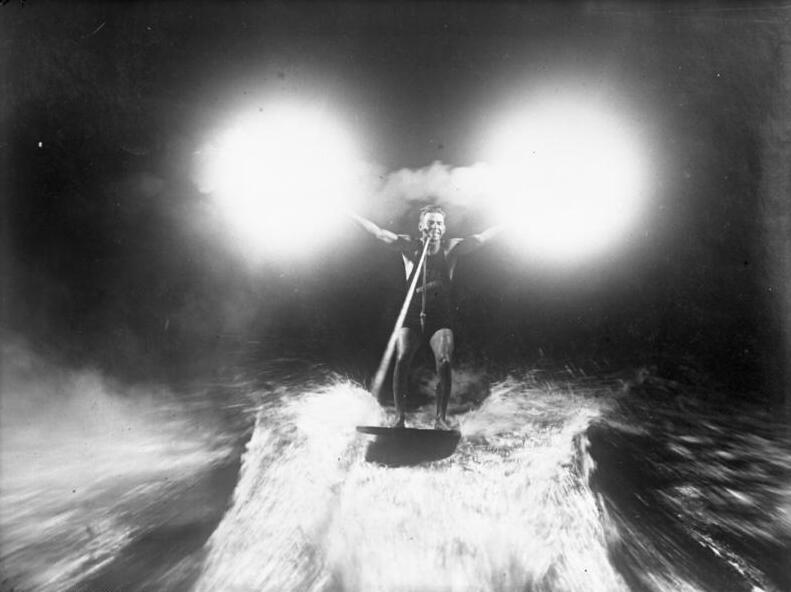
An unusual application of magnesium torches as an illumination source while wakeskating in 1930

- All-weather emergency lighting
- Carrying the Olympic Flame from 1930 to at least 1984
- Underwater light source (obsolete) from the 1950s to the early 1970s.
- Photographic illumination (historical), using a somewhat different form of torch.

== Hazards and safety precautions ==
Underwater use produces large volumes of hydrogen gas, which if trapped in a confined space with exhaled breathing gas, which typically contains more than 17% oxygen by volume, can form a flammable or explosive gas mixture. The range of explosive mixtures of hydrogen and air or oxygen is unusually wide, but varies with temperature, pressure and other factors. A magnesium torch does not necessarily give warning of an atmosphere that cannot support life or consciousness, as it continues to burn underwater, or in an oxygen free atmosphere if sufficient nitrogen or carbon dioxide are present.

== See also ==
- Dive light – Light used underwater by a diver
- List of light sources – Devices and processes that produce light
- Flare – Pyrotechnic light source
