= Place Diana =

Square in Paris, France

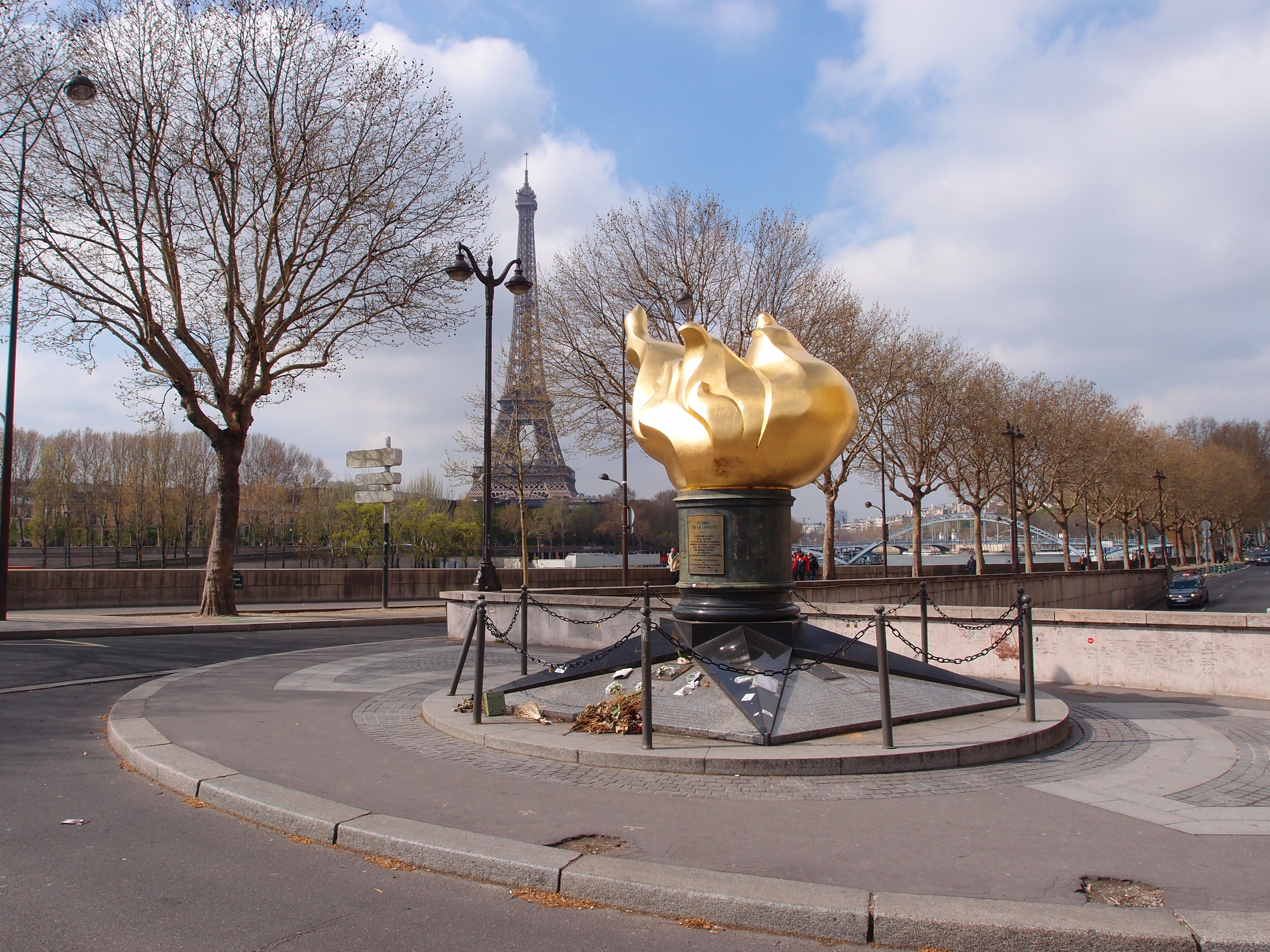
- The Place Diana with the Flame of Liberty

- Location within Paris
- Arrondissement: 16th
- Quarter: Chaillot
- Coordinates: 48°51′51″N 2°18′3″E

Construction
- Completed: 2019

The Place Diana (English: Diana Square) is a public square situated in the 16th arrondissement of Paris, near the Seine river.

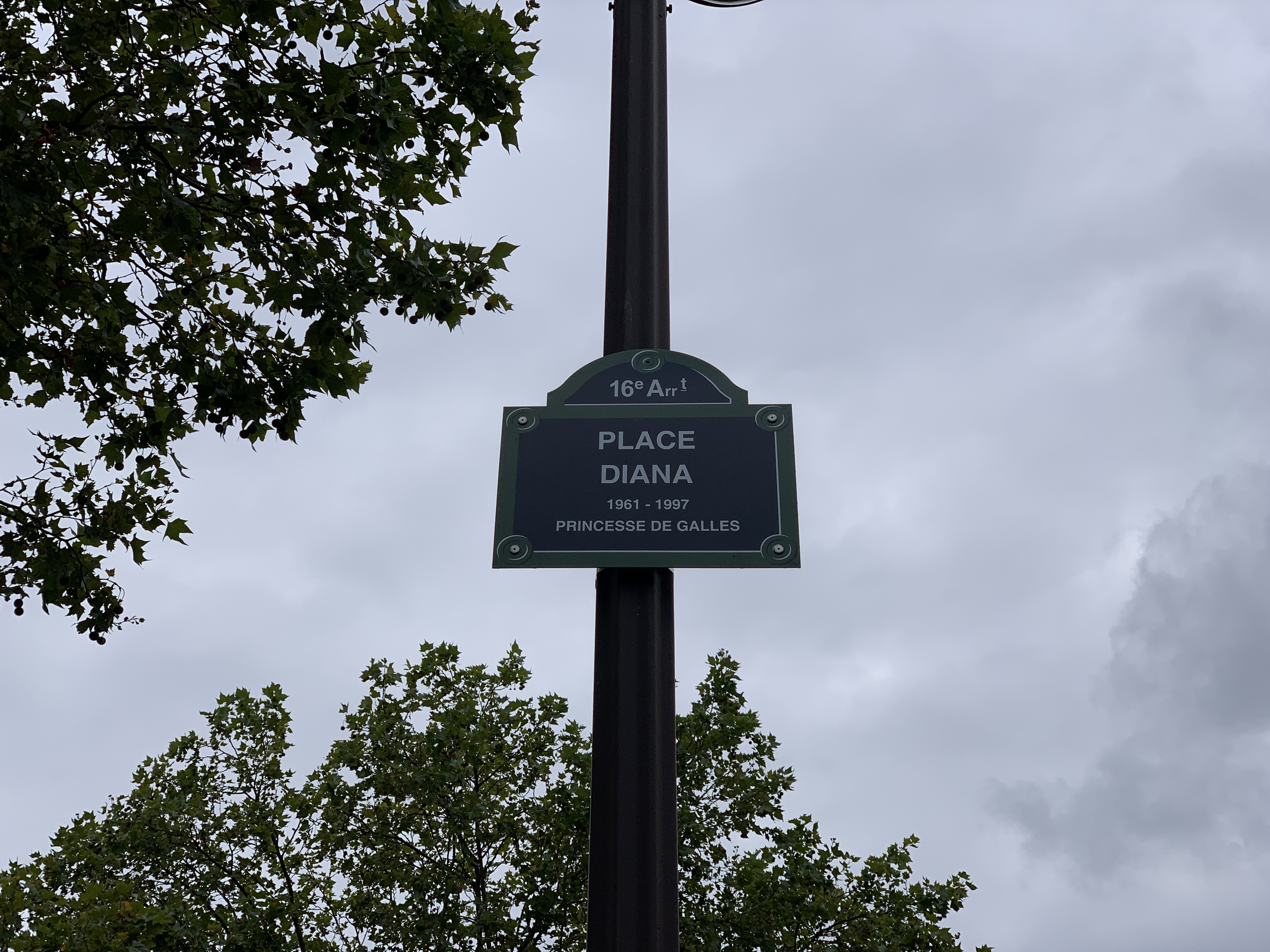
Place Diana plaque

== History ==
The place is named in memory of Diana, Princess of Wales, by vote of the Council of Paris in 2018. The place is just north of the Pont de l'Alma tunnel, where Diana died in a high-speed car crash in 1997.

== Features ==
On this space rises the Flame of Liberty, a replica of the torch of the Statue of Liberty (Liberty Enlightening the World) in New York City. The statue was erected in 1989 to celebrate the Franco-American friendship. Somewhat forgotten, the Flame benefited from a renewed interest when Diana, Princess of Wales, died on 31 August 1997, during a road accident in the tunnel of Pont de l'Alma, located below the monument.
