= U.S. Nautical Magazine =

US Naval Magazine

Commonly known as U.S.Nautical magazine, the U.S. Nautical magazine and Naval Journal was a monthly nautical newsletter published by Griffiths & Bates (New York City) in the 19th century.

== History ==
The U.S.nautical Magazine was first published as the Monthly Nautical Magazine and Quarterly review by Griffiths & Bates (a publishing house in New York). Volume 1 of the U.S. Nautical magazine covered the period October 1854 to March 1855.

== Contents ==
The U.S.Nautical magazine carried articles on seamanship, naval architecture, lists of ship builders in America, descriptions of ships / clippers constructed (like the Sunny South, and Blue Jacket) and their voyages, and often, discoveries of islands and reefs made by ships. It also contained articles on disasters at sea, collisions and financial articles related to shipping.
