= Javel =

Javel may refer to:

- Javel, Paris, a neighborhood of Paris
- Javel–André Citroën station, a Paris Metro station
- Javel station, a train station in the 15th arrondissement of Paris, by the Pont Mirabeau

== See also ==
- Eau de Javel, literally "Javel water" or Sodium hypochlorite (known in English as bleach), product named after a quarter in Paris where it was produced
