= Lycée Jean-Baptiste-Say =

Collège-Lycée Jean-Baptiste-Say
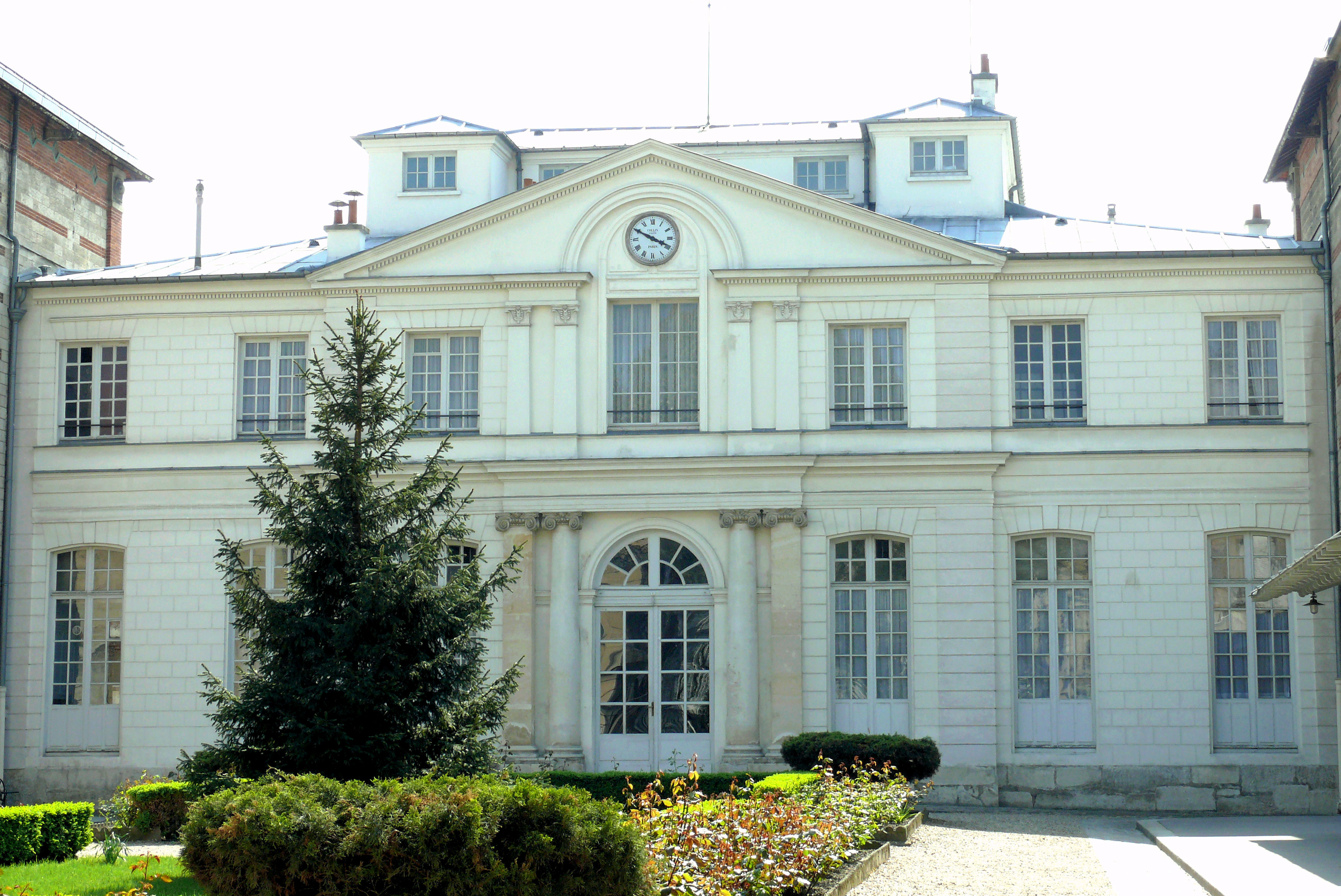
- Central pavilion, former hôtel Galpin, work of the architect Nicolas Dulin.

Location
- 11 bis, rue d’Auteuil, Paris; France
- Coordinates: 48.8474794°N 2.2674849°E

Information
- Type: Établissement public local d'enseignement (EPLE)
- Established: 1895
- Principal: Marie-Claude Puigdemont-Proust
- Enrollment: ~1,600 students
- Website: lyc-jb-say.scola.ac-paris.fr

The collège-lycée Jean-Baptiste-Say is a French public school built in 1895, operating as a collège and lycée as well as offering preparatory classes. It is located at 11 bis, rue d'Auteuil in Paris, in the 16th arrondissement of Paris and bears the name of French classical economist Jean-Baptiste Say (1767–1832). It is often known as JBS, and its students as "Sayens". The lycée is served by the Métro stations Michel-Ange – Auteuil (Paris Métro) and Église d'Auteuil (Paris Métro). In 2016, it was named best public lycée in France by the newspaper Le Monde ahead of Lycée Henri IV.

== Architecture ==
Part of the building at 11 bis rue d'Auteuil is classed as a Monument historique, by decree of 19 October 1928. The protection covers one of the façades of the building, as well as the interior of two rooms. Since 1954, most of the rooms of the lycée have been named in honour of illustrious people, including alumni who were members of the French Resistance, great scientists, and other famous people.

The lycée has three playgrounds and a small square, as well as an amphitheatre, a "courtyard", and an "honour pavilion", as well as classrooms (numbered 1 to 77). In addition, for a number of years there has been a prefabricated building in the centre of one of the courtyards, containing six classrooms (B1 to B6).

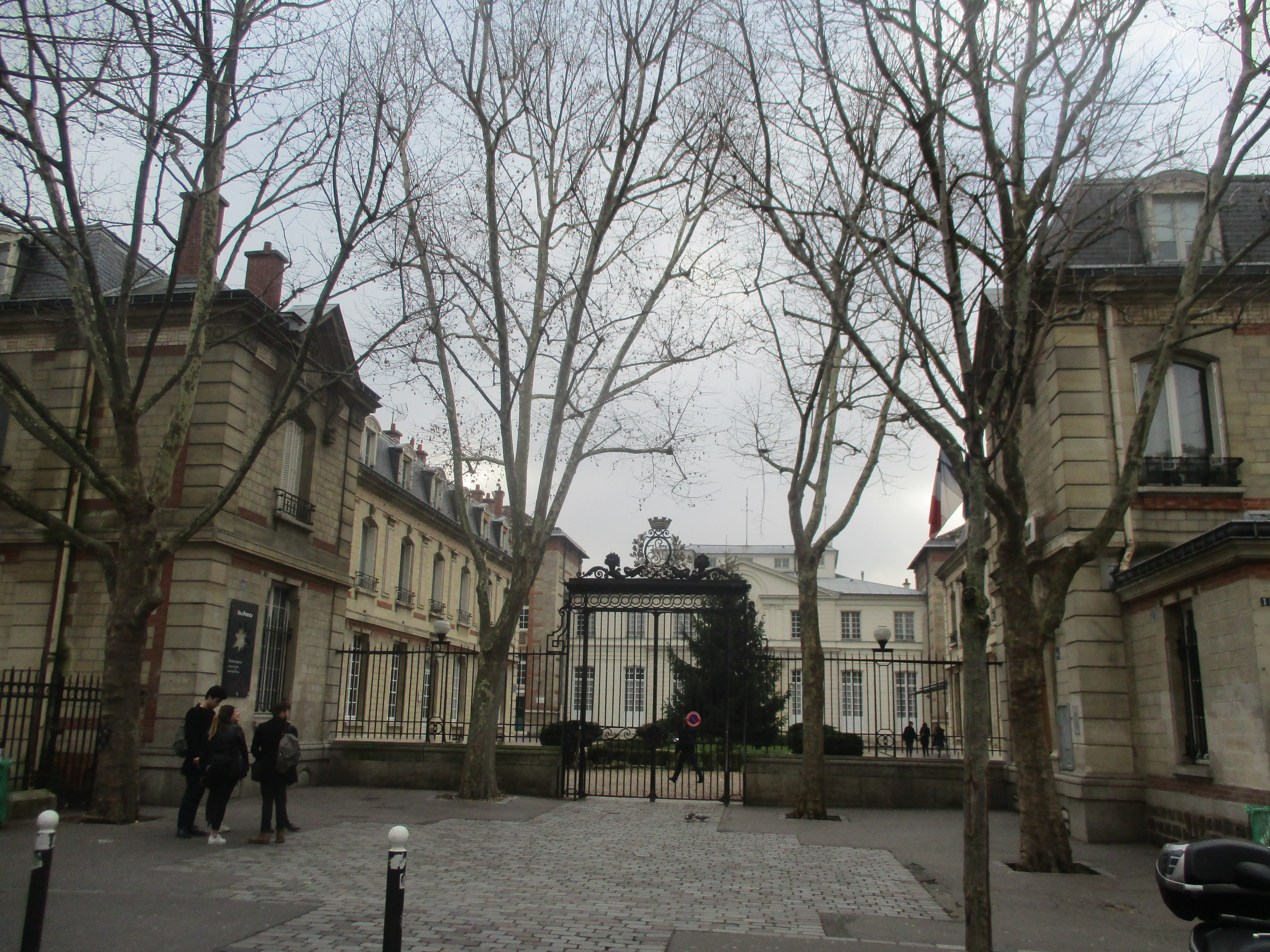
Façades

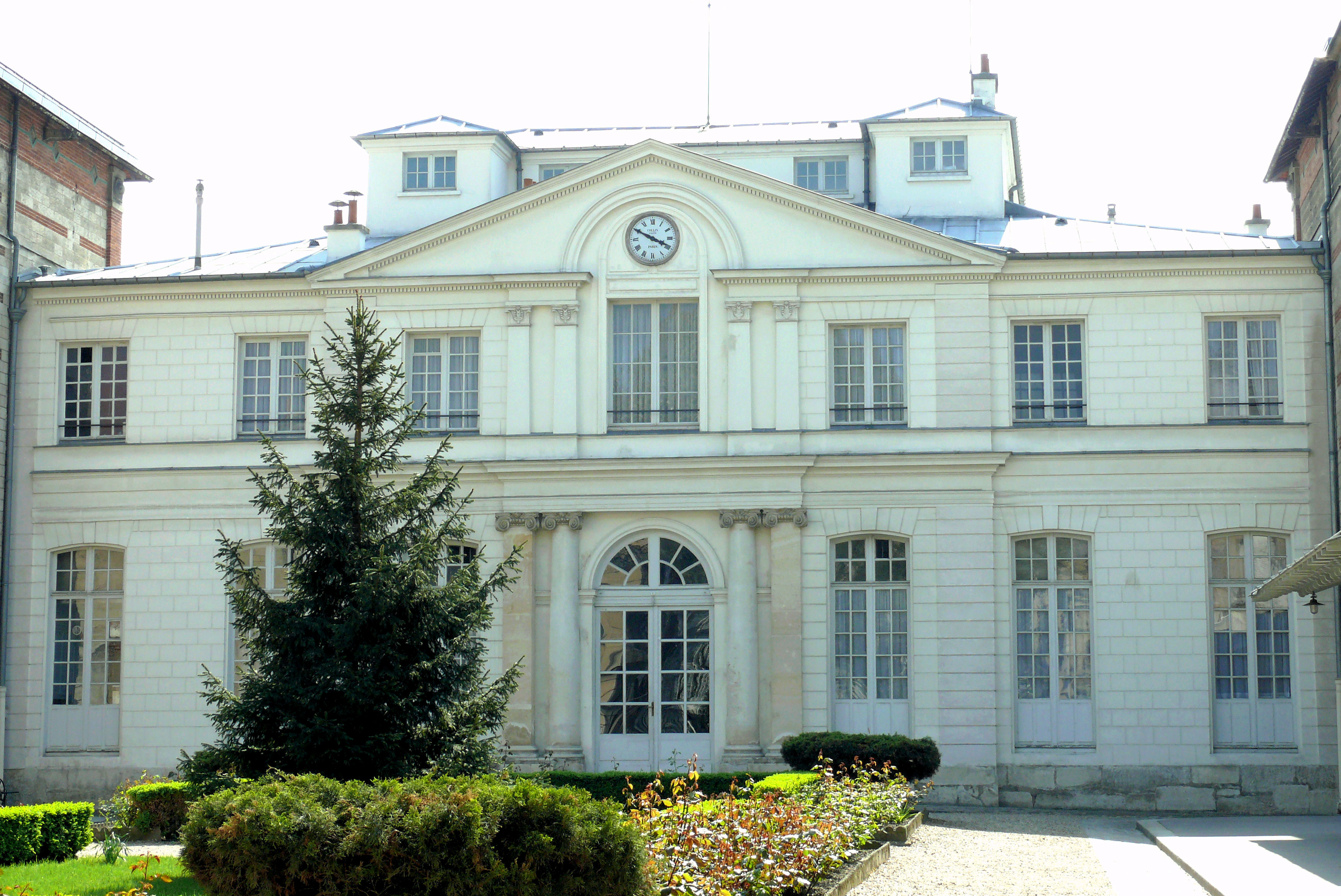
Central pavilion, classed as a historic monument

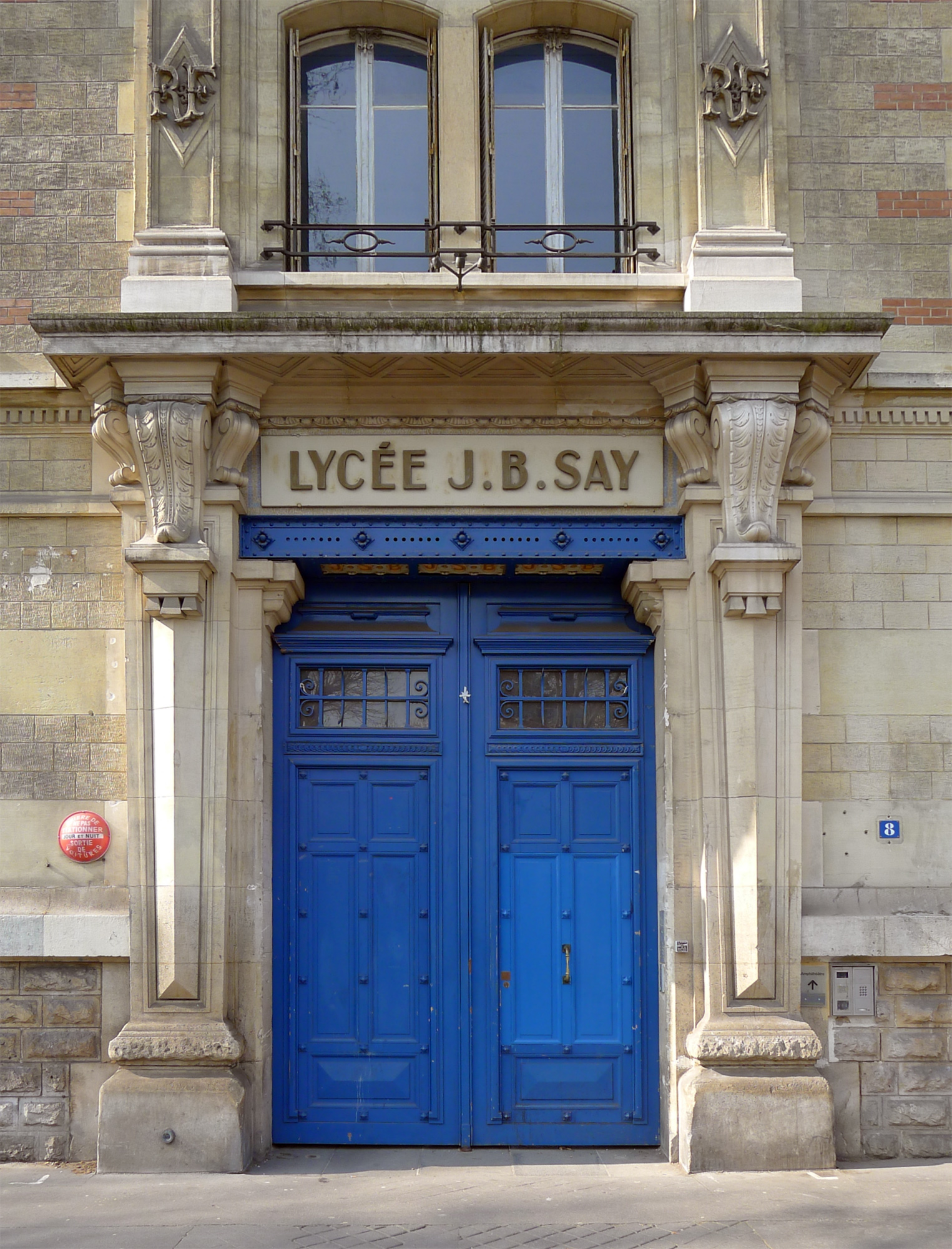
Entrance, rue Chardon-Lagache

== Results ==
=== Baccalauréat ===
In 2015, the lycée was ranked 29th out of 109 at départemental level in terms of teaching quality, and 255th at national level. The ranking was based on three criteria: the level of bac results, the proportion of students who obtain their baccalauréat results having spent the last two years at the establishment, and added value (calculated based on the social origin of the students, their age, and their national diploma results).

=== Preparatory classes ===
The lycée Jean-Baptiste-Say offers three scientific preparatory classes : PSI, PT, BCPST.

In 2017, L'Étudiant gave the following results for the courses of 2016 :

Stream	Students admitted to a grande école*	Admission rate*	Average rate over 5 years	National ranking	Rate year-on-year
PSI / PSI*	5 / 34 students	17.2%	14.9%	28th out of 120	=
PT / PT*	34 / 39 students	83.3%	85.4%	2nd out of 62	▼1
BCPST	24 / 39 students	61.5%	45.9%	11th out of 53	▲3
Source : Classement 2017 des prépas – L'Étudiant (Concours de 2016). * the rate of admission depends upon the grandes écoles used in the study. For the scientific stream, it is a group of 11 to 17 engineering schools chosen by L'Étudiant for the streams (MP, PC, PSI, PT or BCPST).

== List of headteachers ==
- 1875–1880 : M. Marguerin (director)
- 1880–1888 : M. Coutant (director)
- 1888–1909 : M. Lévêque (director)
- 1909–1915 : M. Boitel (director)
- 1915–1927 : M. Haudié (director)
- 1927–1940 : M. Laudet (director)
- 1940–1941 : M. Place (director)
- 1941–1944 : M. Béjean (principal)
- 1944–1952 : M. Place (principal)
- 1952–1954 : M. Place
- 1954–1988 : M. Laye
- 1988–1994 : Madame Marceau
- 1995–2002 : Anny Duchêne – Forestier
- 2002–2008 : Gérard Patenotte
- 2008–2013 : Jacqueline Marguin-Durand
- 2013–2016 : Sylvain Gressot
- Since 2016 : Marie-Claude Puigdemont – Proust

== Alumni ==
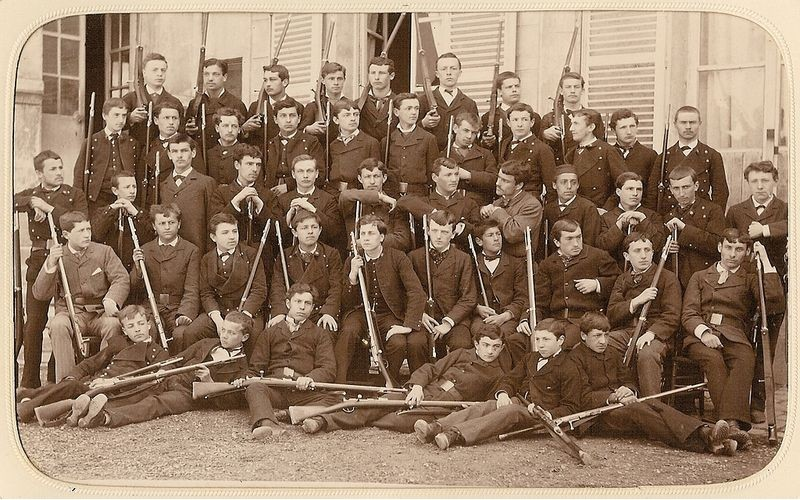
Photo from 1881.

- Pierre Bézier, engineer
- Thomas Gomart, historian
- Pierre Lafue, teacher and writer
- Yvon Palamour, Breton cabinetmaker, luthier, musician
- Laure Saint-Raymond, mathematician
- Jean-François Revel, philosopher and essayist
- Georges Normandy, writer and literary critic

== The lycée in cinema and television ==
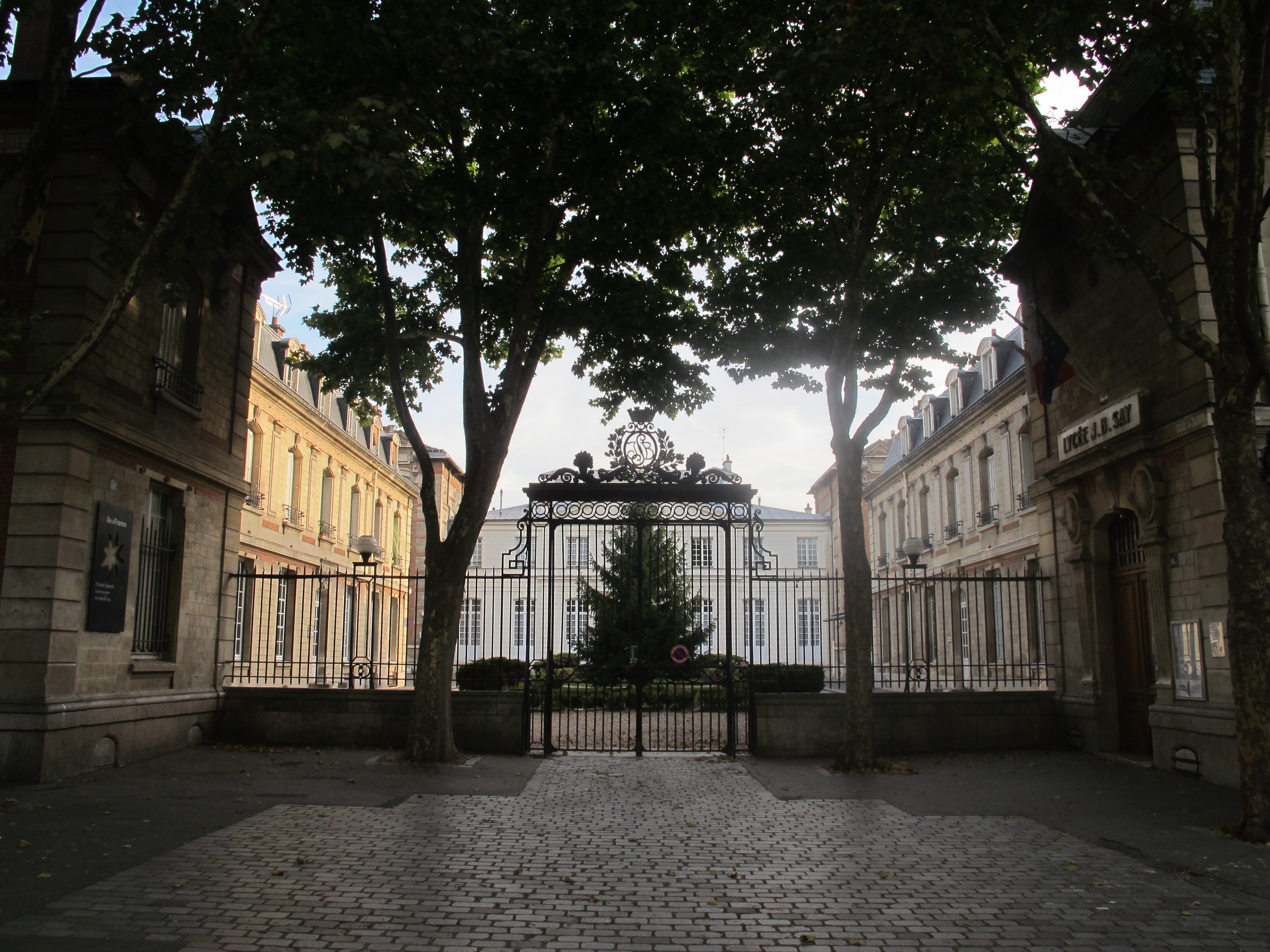

- 1978 : Le Pion
- 1994–2006 : Madame le Proviseur
- 1980 : Au bon beurre, telefilm by Édouard Molinaro (lycée in which Léon Lécuyer teaches after the war)
- 1995 : Les allumettes suédoises, trilogy of telefilms, after the eponymous novel by Robert Sabatier
- 2006 : Paris 2011, La Grande Inondation, docu-fiction by Bruno-Victor Pujebet
- 2007 : Le Cœur des hommes 2, film by Marc Esposito.
- 2009 : LOL, film by Lisa Azuelos.
- 2010 : The Round Up, film by Rose Bosch
- 2010 to now: Clem, TV series by Joyce Buñuel
- 2012 : L'Homme de ses rêves, telefilm by Christophe Douchand
- 2014 : Joséphine, ange gardien, episode 69 : "Double Foyer"

== See also ==
- Lycée Paul-Valéry
