= Pont Mirabeau =

Bridge in Paris, France

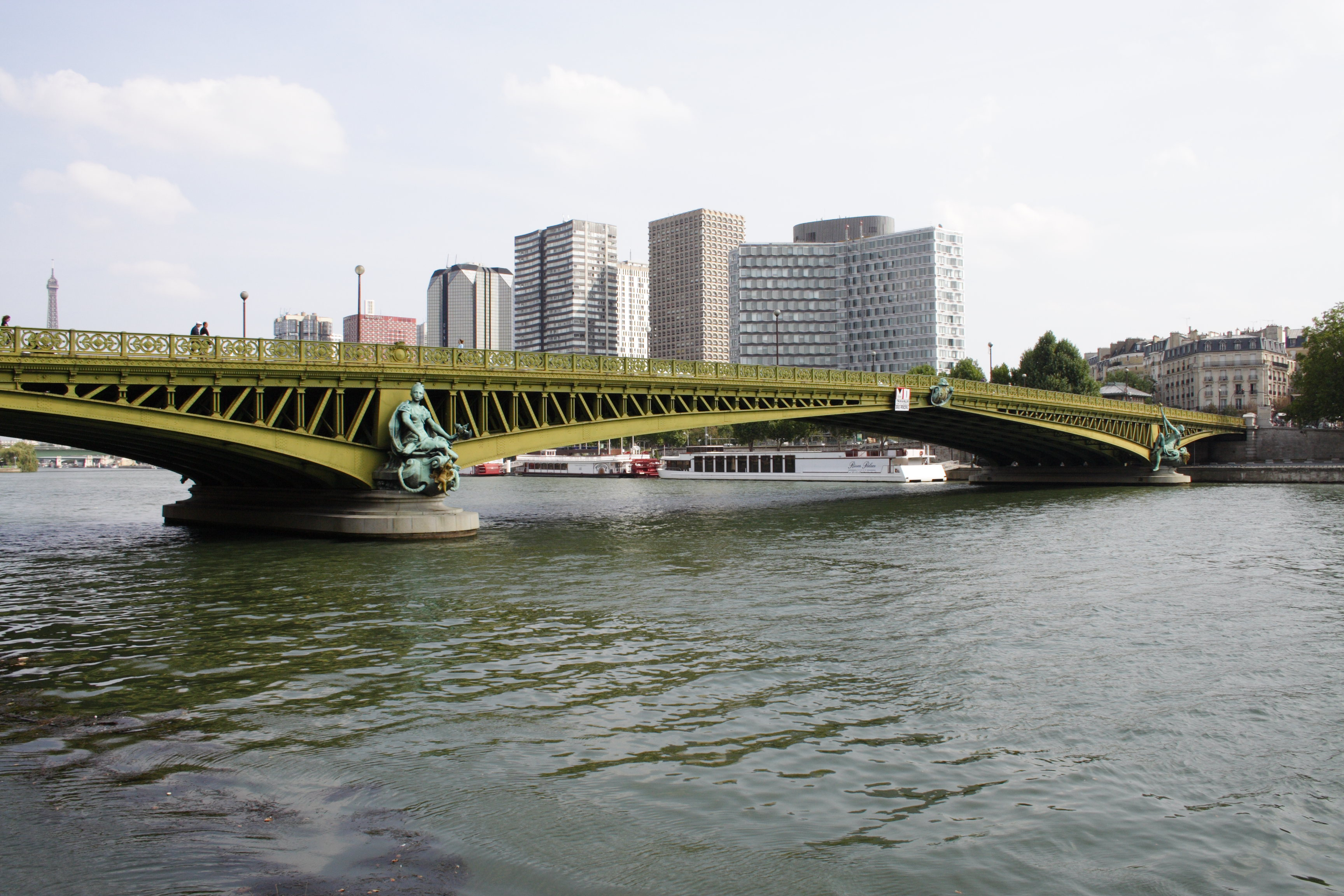
- Coordinates: 48°50′48.09″N 02°16′31.85″E
- Crosses: Seine
- Locale: Paris, France
- Next upstream: Pont de Grenelle
- Next downstream: Pont du Garigliano

Characteristics
- Design: arch bridge
- Total length: 173 m
- Width: 20 m

History
- Construction start: 1893
- Construction end: 1896

The pont Mirabeau (French pronunciation: [pɔ̃ miʁabo]) is an arch bridge which spans the Seine in Paris. It was built between 1895 and 1897 and named after Honoré Gabriel Riqueti de Mirabeau. It was listed a historical monument in 1975.

== Location ==
The bridge spans the Seine, connecting the quarter of Javel in the 15th arrondissement (left bank) to Auteuil in the 16th arrondissement. It links rue de la Convention and place Mirabeau, on the left bank, to rue de Rémusat. On the left side, upstream, is the gare de Javel of the RER, line C. The bridge is served by the Paris Metro stations Mirabeau and Javel–André Citroën.

== History ==
The decision to create a new bridge to the right of the junction created by avenue de Versailles and rue Mirabeau was taken by the French President Sadi Carnot on 12 January 1893. The bridge was designed by the engineer Paul Rabel, responsible for the bridges of Paris, assisted by the engineers Jean Résal and Amédée d'Alby, and built by Daydé & Pillé. The bridge was officially opened by the then French President Félix Faure at a ceremony conducted on 13 July 1897.

== Architecture ==
Location on the Seine

The principal arch has a span of 93 meters, and the two lateral arches 32,4 m. The one on the right bank spans the road, while that on the left bank spans the quay and extends the link over the RER railway. At the time of its construction, this was the longest and highest bridge in Paris. The bridge is 173 meters long, 20 m wide (the roadway measures 12 m, and the two pavements 4 m each).

The two piles represent boats. The one closest to the right bank shows the Seine flowing downstream, while the one on the left shore shows her going upstream. These boats are decorated with four allegorical statues by Jean Antoine Injalbert (named an officer of the Légion d'honneur on the day of the bridge's inauguration) : "The City of Paris" (prow of the boat on the right bank), "Navigation" (stern), "Abundance" (prow of the boat of the left bank) and "Commerce" (stern). The two allegories on the prow ("Paris" and "Abundance") face the Seine, while the two stern allegories ("Navigation" and "Commerce") face the bridge.

The four statues are surmounted, at the level of the parapet, by the coat of arms of the City of Paris.

At its end on the Rive Droite, one can descend towards the road on bank by two stairways (one downstream, one upstream), while on the left bank one can descend towards the Port autonome de Paris by two ramps (one downstream, one upstream).

== In the arts ==
- Le Pont Mirabeau is a poem by Guillaume Apollinaire, in the anthology Alcools. To hear a 1913 reading by the author, click here
- This poem was later set to music by Lionel Daunais and also The Pogues.
- Brassens refers to it in his song Les Ricochets.
- Galway Kinnell references it in his poem "Little Sleep-Heads Sprouting Hair in the Moonlight"
- Sam Larkin's song "Mirabeau Bridge" (1974) inspired by Apollinaire's poem, has been covered by James Keelaghan on his CD "Roads".
- Jem Finer composed music for an English translation of the poem. It appears on The Pogues' album Pogue Mahone (1996).
- Le Pont Mirabeau is a song by Marc Lavoine that came out in 2001.
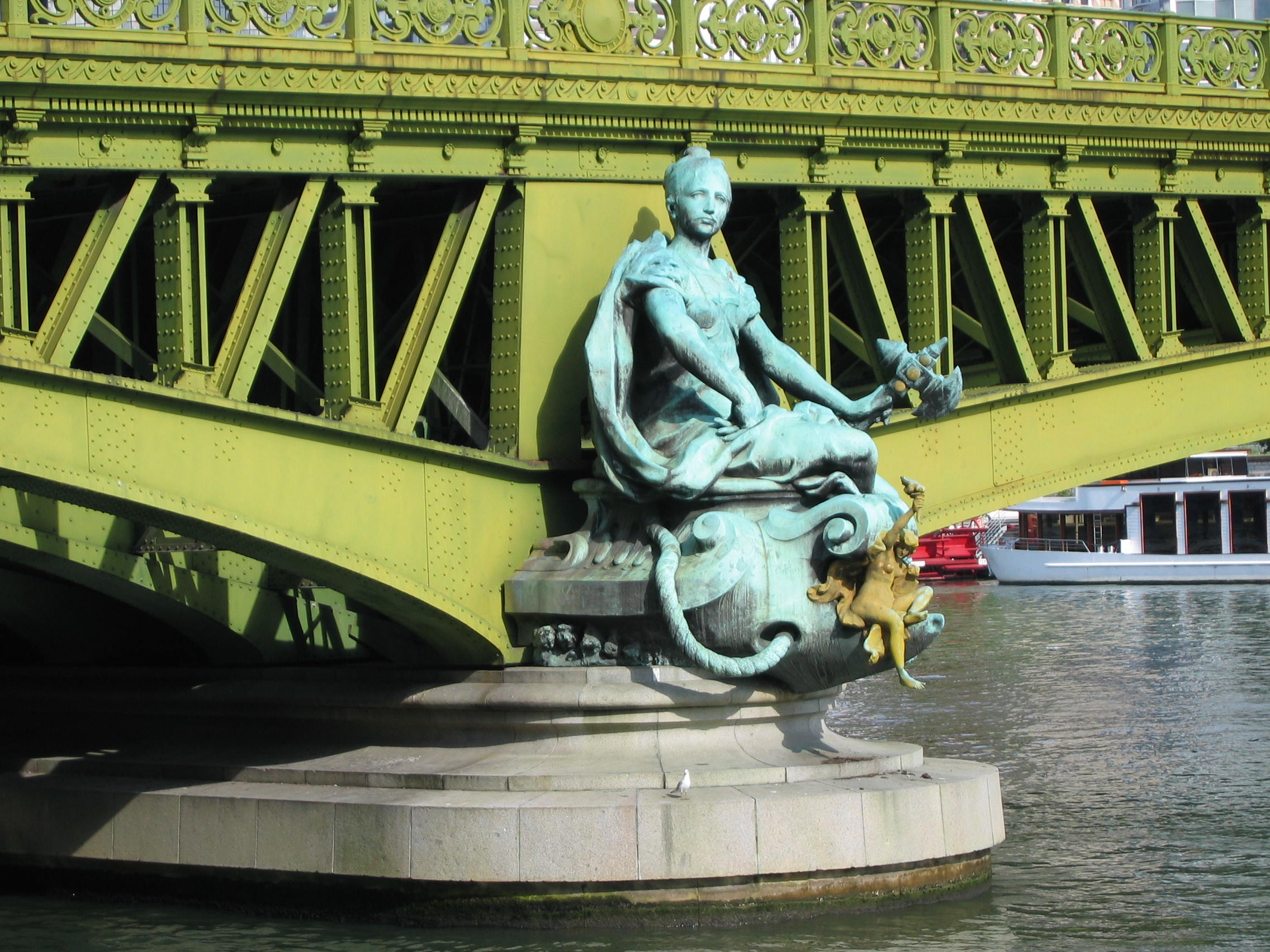
The Ville de Paris, descending into the Seine guided by Navigation, armed with a francisque, symbol of France

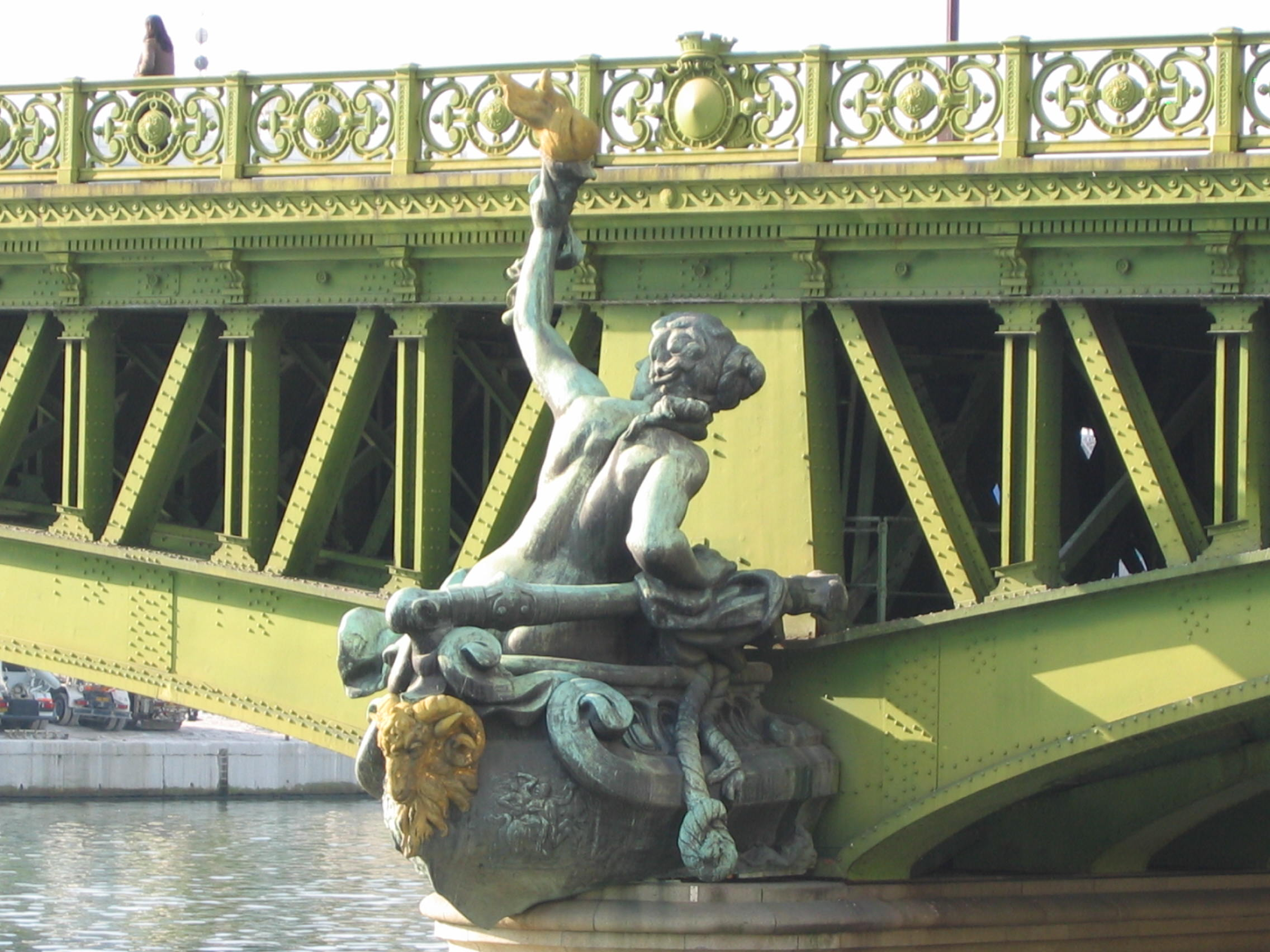
Navigation, representing Parisian inland water transport

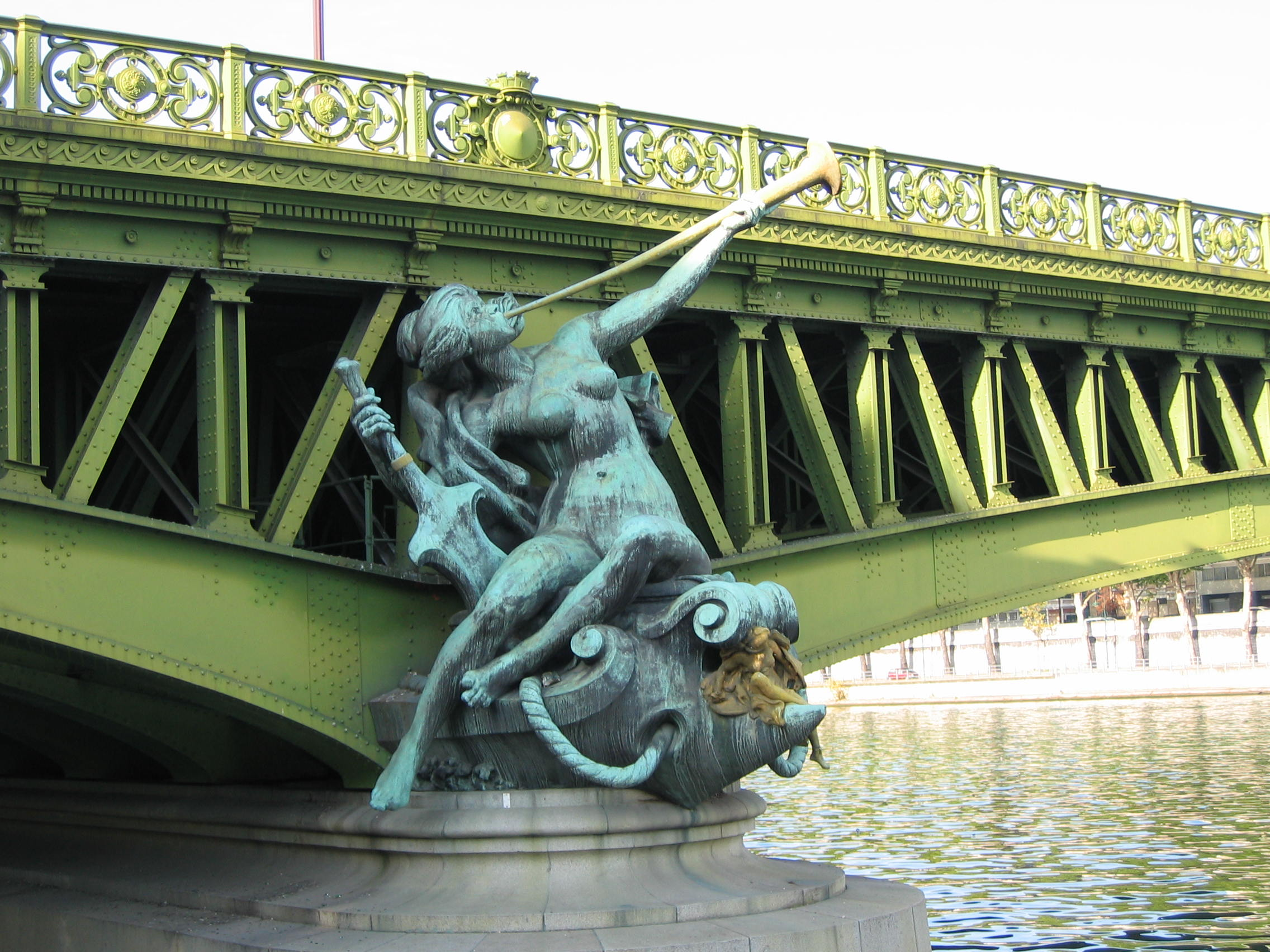
Abundance, on the prow of a trading ship

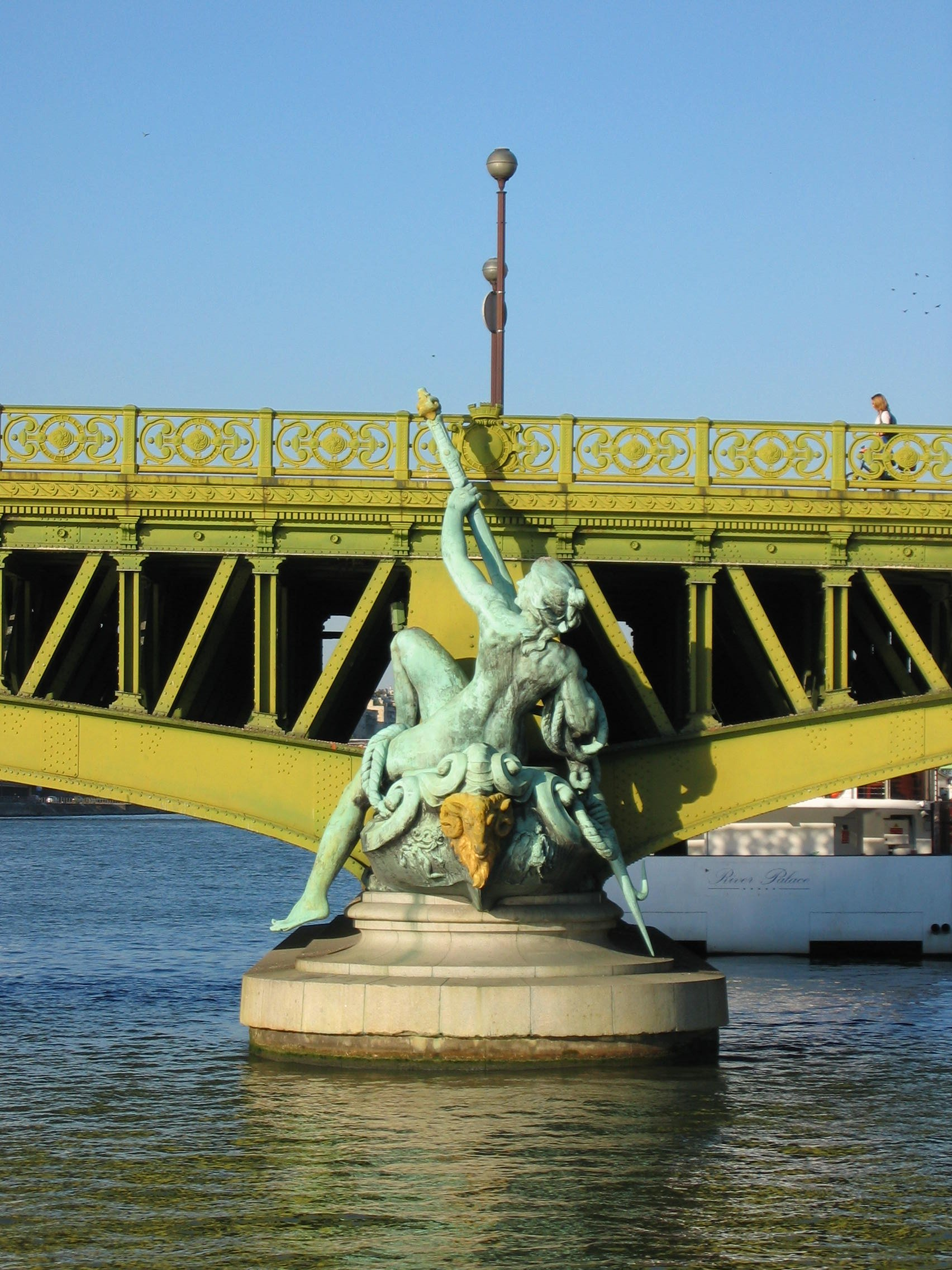
Commerce, holding rigging, at the stern of an abundant boat

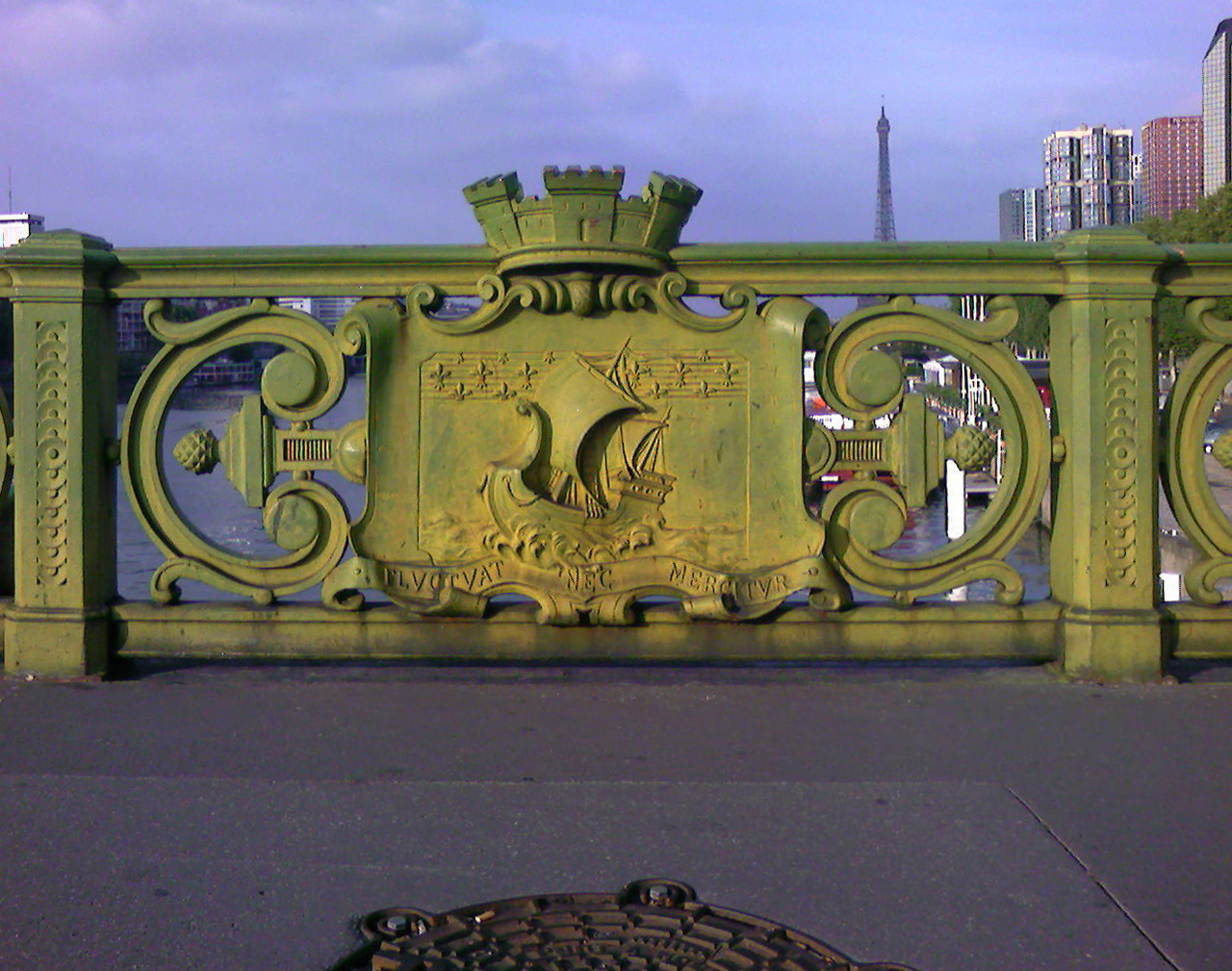
The arms of the city of Paris, on the back of each pile

== See also ==
- Listing of the work of Jean Antoine Injalbert-French sculptor
