= Square Paul-Gilot =

Garden square in Paris, France

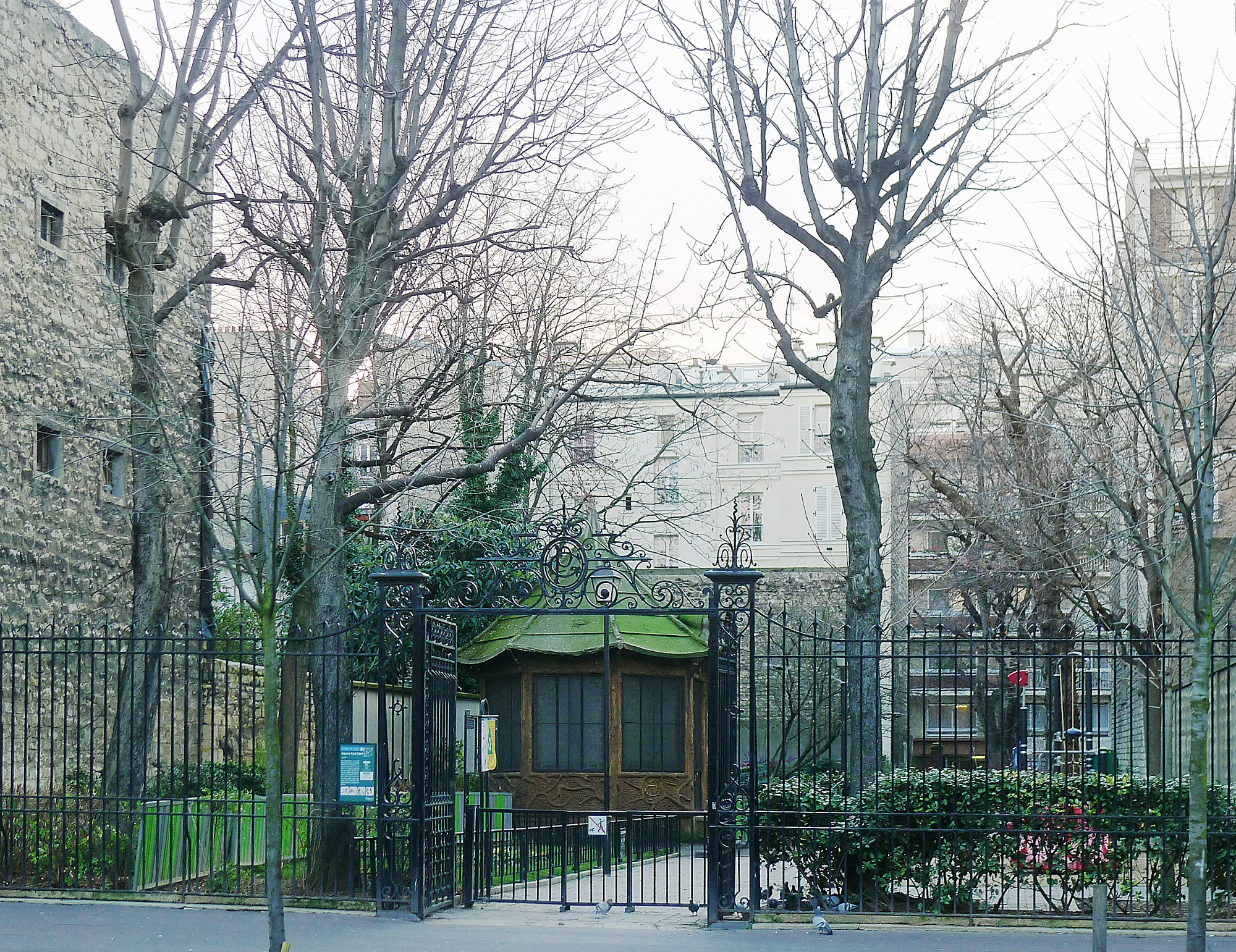
- The Square Paul-Gilot seen from Rue de la Convention

- Location within Paris
- Arrondissement: 15th
- Quarter: Saint-Lambert; Javel
- Coordinates: 48°50′39″N 2°16′50″E

Construction
- Completion: 1926

The Square Paul-Gilot is a garden square in the Saint-Lambert and Javel quarters in the 15th arrondissement of Paris, France.

== Location ==
It is located at 38 bis, Rue de la Convention, in front of the former Paris National Printing Works, now the headquarters of the General Inspection of Foreign Affairs. The garden square can also be reached from Rue Sébastien-Mercier.

It is served by the station Javel–André Citroën of the Métro Line 10.

== History ==
The garden square was established in 1926. It was left to the Paris city council by the mother of Paul Gilot (1888–1938), an engineer of the Compagnie des glaces et verres spéciaux de France, after whom the street was named.

== Features ==
The garden has a small pagoda-like pavilion.
