= Mirabeau station =

Metro station in Paris, France

Mirabeau
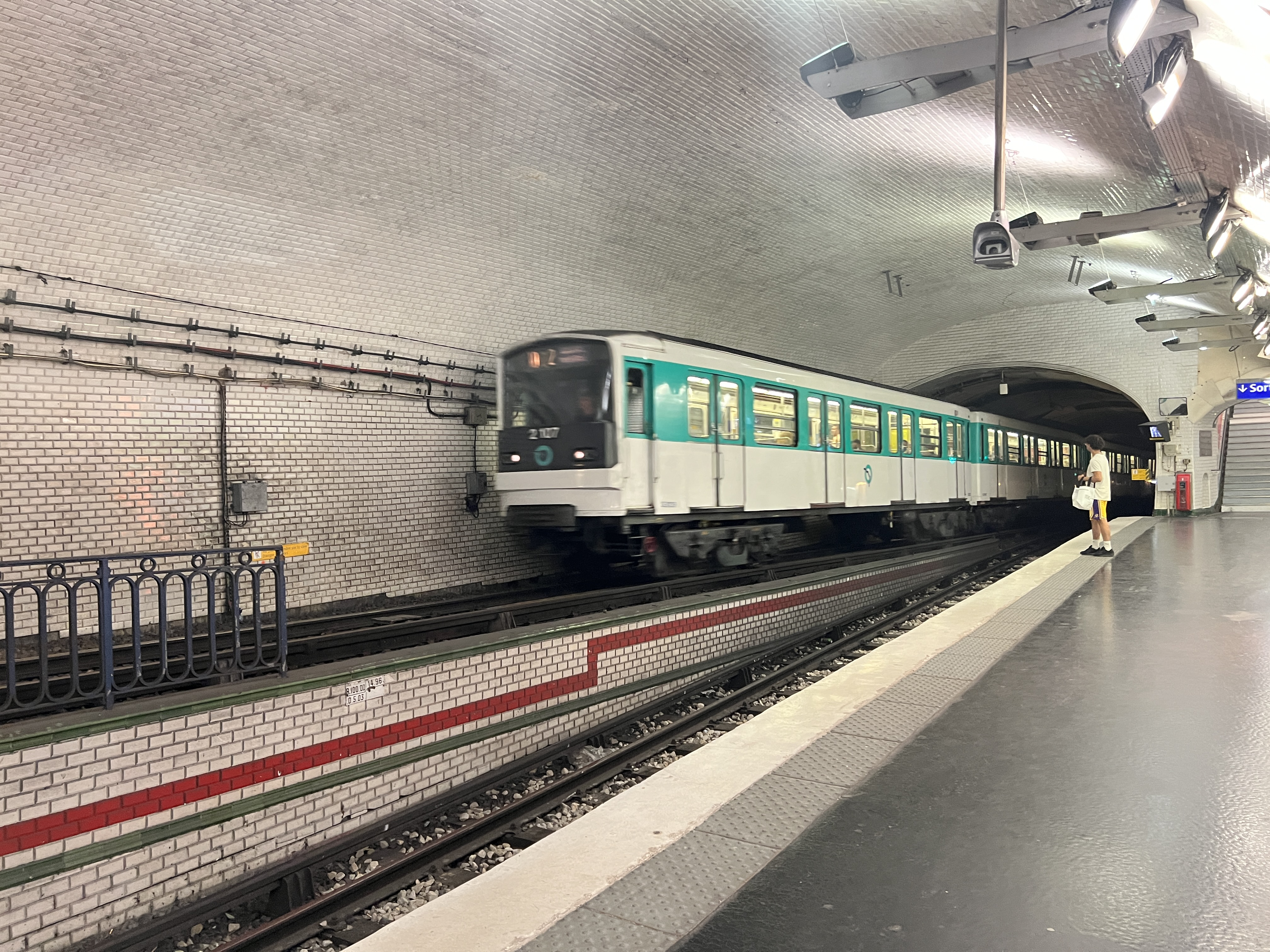
- MF 67 at Mirabeau heading towards Église d'Auteuil

General information
- Location: Place de Barcelone; 75016 Paris
- Coordinates: 48°50′49″N 2°16′20″E
- System: Paris Métro rapid transit station
- Owner: RATP
- Operator: RATP
- Line: Paris Metro Paris Metro Line 10
- Platforms: 1 (1 side platform)
- Tracks: 2

Construction
- Accessible: no

Other information
- Station code: 0712
- Fare zone: 1

History
- Opened: 30 September 1913

Passengers
- 1,001,302 (2021)
- Rank: 284th of 305

Services
| Preceding station | Paris Metro | Following station |
|---|---|---|
| Chardon Lagache One-way operation | Line 10 Eastbound only | Javel–André Citroën towards Gare d'Austerlitz |
Location

Mirabeau (French pronunciation: [miʁabo]) is a rapid transit station on Line 10 of the Paris Métro system. Located in the 16th arrondissement of the city, it is served solely by eastbound trains to Gare d'Austerlitz. It is located near Église d'Auteuil (with their accesses are less than 100 m apart), and as such, the two stations can be considered twins, with Mirabeau serving eastbound traffic and Église d'Auteuil serving westbound traffic, albeit with separate entrances and exits. The station is named after the nearby rue Mirabeau, under which it runs. It was in turn named after Honoré Gabriel Riqueti, the Count of Mirabeau, a leader during the early stages of the French Revolution. The station is near the Pont Mirabeau.

== History ==
The station opened on 30 September 1913 as part of the extension of line 8 from Charles Michels (then known as Beaugrenelle) to Porte d'Auteuil. On 27 July 1937, the section of line 8 between La Motte-Picquet–Grenelle and Porte d'Auteuil, including Mirabeau was transferred to line 10 during the reconfiguration of lines 8, 10, and the old line 14. However, service between Porte d'Auteuil and Jussieu was not provided until two days later, on July 29, with service initially limited to La Motte-Picquet-Grenelle.

As part of the "Renouveau du métro" programme by the RATP, the station's corridors was renovated and modernised on 15 September 2006.

In 2019, the station was used by 1,377,611 passengers, making it the 281st busiest of the Métro network out of 302 stations.

In 2020, the station was used by 724,167 passengers amidst the COVID-19 pandemic, making it the 277th busiest of the Métro network out of 305 stations.

In 2021, the station was used by 1,001,302 passengers, making it the 284th busiest of the Métro network out of 305 stations.

== Passenger services ==
=== Access ===
The station has 2 accesses divided amongst 3 access points:

- Access 1: avenue de Versailles (with a Guimard entrance – it was listed as a historical monument on 12 February 2016)
- Access 2: rue Mirabeau (with a rare Val d'Osne totem)

=== Station layout ===
Street Level
| B1 | Mezzanine |
| Platform level | Westbound | ← does not stop here (Église d'Auteuil) |
| Platform level | Eastbound | toward Gare d'Austerlitz (Javel – André Citroën) → |
| Platform level | Side platform, doors will open on the right |

=== Platforms ===
The station has a unique configuration in which it only has a single side platform that serves only one track – the eastbound track for trains heading towards Javel–André Citroën. The westbound track, however, does not have a platform that serves it. Instead, it has an ascending ramp for trains heading towards Église d'Auteuil and diverges at the western end of the station. This ramp enables the westbound track to stay near the surface to reach Église d'Auteuil as Mirabeau is relatively deep underground due to the tunnels between it Javel–André Citroën needing to pass under the Seine.

=== Other connections ===
The station is also served by lines 22, 62 and 72 of the RATP bus network, and at night, by lines N12 and N61 of the Noctilien network.

== Gallery ==
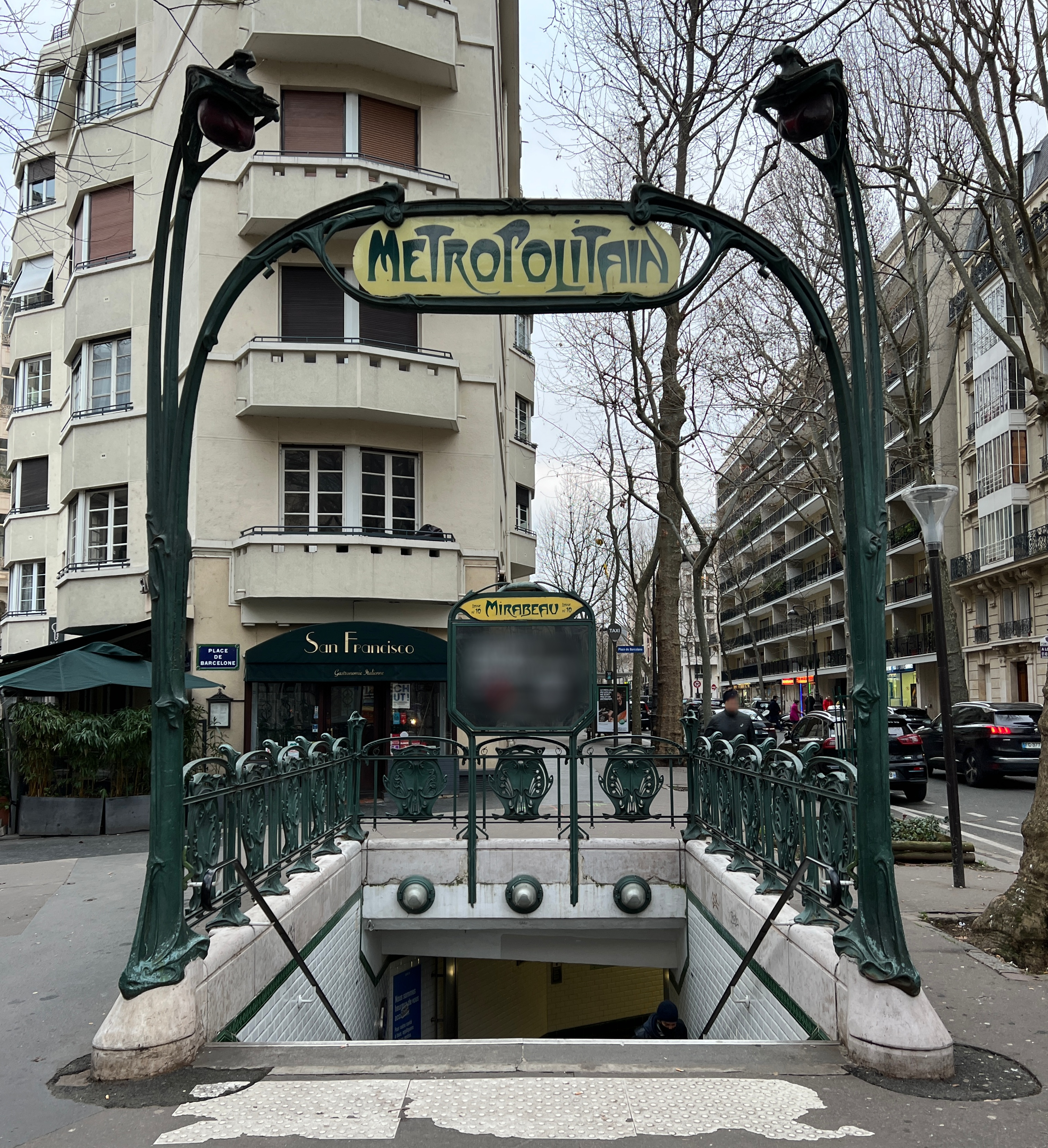
Access 1

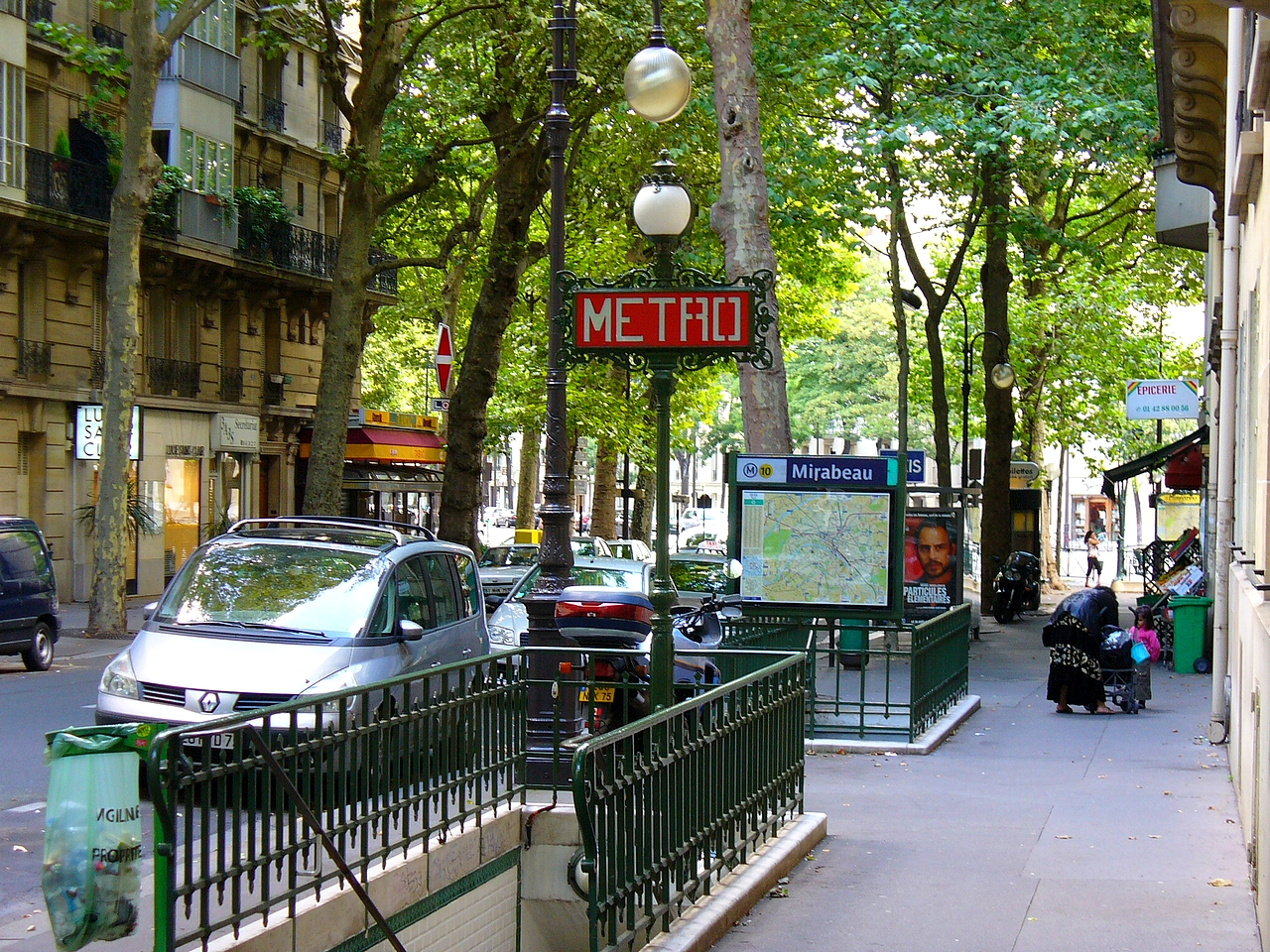
Access 2

Metro passing at station, heading towards Église d'Auteuil station.
