= Javel–André Citroën station =

Paris Métro station

Javel–André Citroën
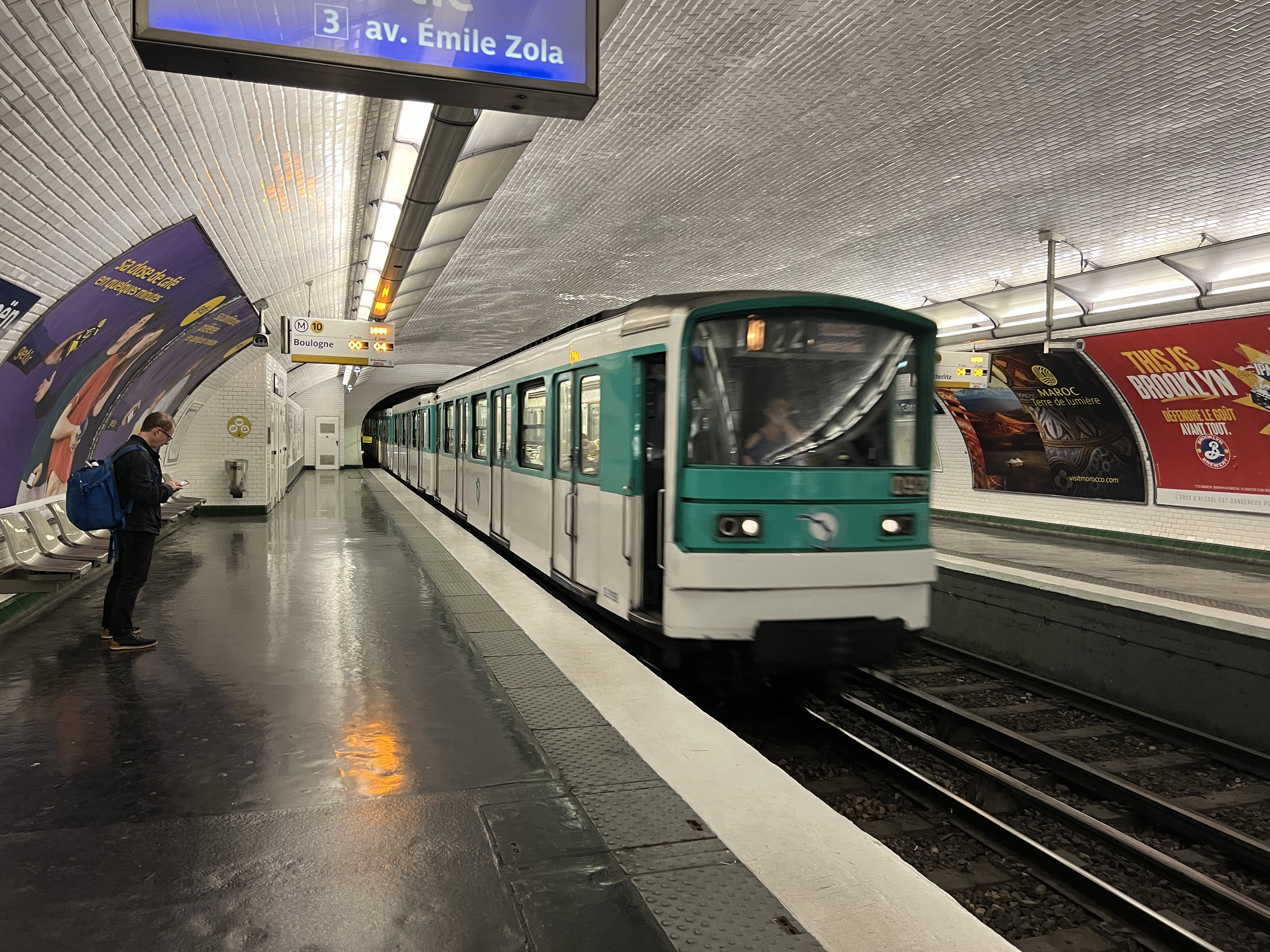
- MF 67 at Javel–André Citroën

General information
- Location: 15th arrondissement of Paris; Île-de-France; France
- Coordinates: 48°50′46″N 2°16′43″E
- System: Paris Métro station
- Owner: RATP
- Operator: RATP
- Line: Paris Metro Paris Metro Line 10
- Platforms: 2 (2 side platforms)
- Tracks: 2

Construction
- Accessible: no

Other information
- Station code: 1614
- Fare zone: 1

History
- Opened: 30 September 1913
- Former names: Javel (30 September 1913 - 8 June 1959)

Passengers
- 1,589,561 (2021)
- Rank: 222nd of 305

Services
Preceding station	Paris Metro	Following station
Église d'Auteuil towards Boulogne–Pont de Saint-Cloud	Line 10 Westbound only	Charles Michels towards Gare d'Austerlitz
Mirabeau One-way operation	Line 10 Eastbound only	Charles Michels towards Gare d'Austerlitz
Connections to other stations
Preceding station	RER	Following station
Pont du Garigliano towards Versailles Château Rive Gauche or Saint-Quentin-en-Yvelines	RER C transfer at Javel	Champ de Mars–Tour Eiffel towards Massy-Palaiseau, Dourdan-la-Forêt or Saint-Martin-d'Étampes
Location
- Location within Paris

Javel–André Citroën (French pronunciation: [ʒavɛl ɑ̃dʁe sitʁɔɛn]) is a station of the Paris Métro, serving line 10 and offering transfer to the RER C via Javel RER station in the 15th arrondissement. West of this station, line 10 splits into separate eastbound and westbound sections until Boulogne–Jean Jaurès (although both lines pass through Mirabeau, it is only served by eastbound trains; the point where the lines actually diverge is located west of that station).

== History ==
Front de Seine as seen from Pont Mirabeau

The station opened as Javel on 30 September 1913 as part of the extension of line 8 from Beaugrenelle (now Charles Michels) to Porte d'Auteuil. It was named after the nearby Quai de Javel, which parallelled the bank of the Seine where it adjoined the district of Javel. In 1785, Claude Louis Berthollet discovered the active ingredient in household bleach, sodium hypochlorite, and in 1789 built a factory at Javel. Bleach came to be called eau de Javel in French.

On 27 July 1937, the section of line 8 between La Motte-Picquet–Grenelle and Porte d'Auteuil, including Javel, was transferred to line 10 during the reconfiguration of lines 8, 10, and the old line 14. On 8 June 1959, the station was renamed Javel–André Citroën, a year after the Quai de Javel was renamed Quai André-Citroën. André Citroën (1878-1935), an engineer and businessman, founded the automobile firm Citroën in 1919. His factory in Paris occupied much of the area adjoining the Quai from 1915 until the late 1970s.

Until the 2000s, an exhibition was set up on the platforms to commemorate the life and business dealings of André Citroën through posters and photographs placed on the walls. This was, however, removed as part of the "Renouveau du métro" programme by the RATP. Since June 2018, an exhibition dedicated to Citroën was installed, including a timeline retracing its history and touch screens allowing travelers to access its website directly on the platforms.

In 2019, the station was used by 2,969,444 passengers, making it the 177th busiest of the Métro network out of 302 stations.

In 2020, the station was used by 1,331,833 passengers amidst the COVID-19 pandemic, making it the 194th busiest of the Métro network out of 305 stations.

In 2021, the station was used by 1,589,561 passengers, making it the 222nd busiest of the Métro network out of 305 stations.

== Passenger services ==
=== Access ===
The station has 3 accesses on either side of avenue Émile-Zola:

- Access 1: quai André-Citroën (with a rare Val d'Osne totem)
- Access 2: rue de la Convention
- Access 3: avenue Émile-Zola (with an escalator)

=== Station layout ===
Street Level
B1	Mezzanine
Platform level	Side platform, doors will open on the right
Platform level	Westbound	← toward Boulogne – Pont de Saint-Cloud (Église d'Auteuil)
Platform level	Eastbound	toward Gare d'Austerlitz (Charles Michels) →
Platform level	Side platform, doors will open on the right

=== Platforms ===
The station has a standard configuration with 2 tracks surrounded by 2 side platforms.

=== Other connections ===
The station is also served by the RER C line across the road at Javel station as well as lines 30, 62, and 88 of the RATP bus network.

== Nearby ==
- Église Saint-Christophe-de-Javel
- Front de Seine
- Jardin des Cévennes
- Jardin des Mères-et-Grands-Mères-de-la-Place-de-Mai
- Parc André Citroën
- Piscine Keller
- Pont Mirabeau
- Port of Javel-Bas
- square Paul-Gilot

== Gallery ==
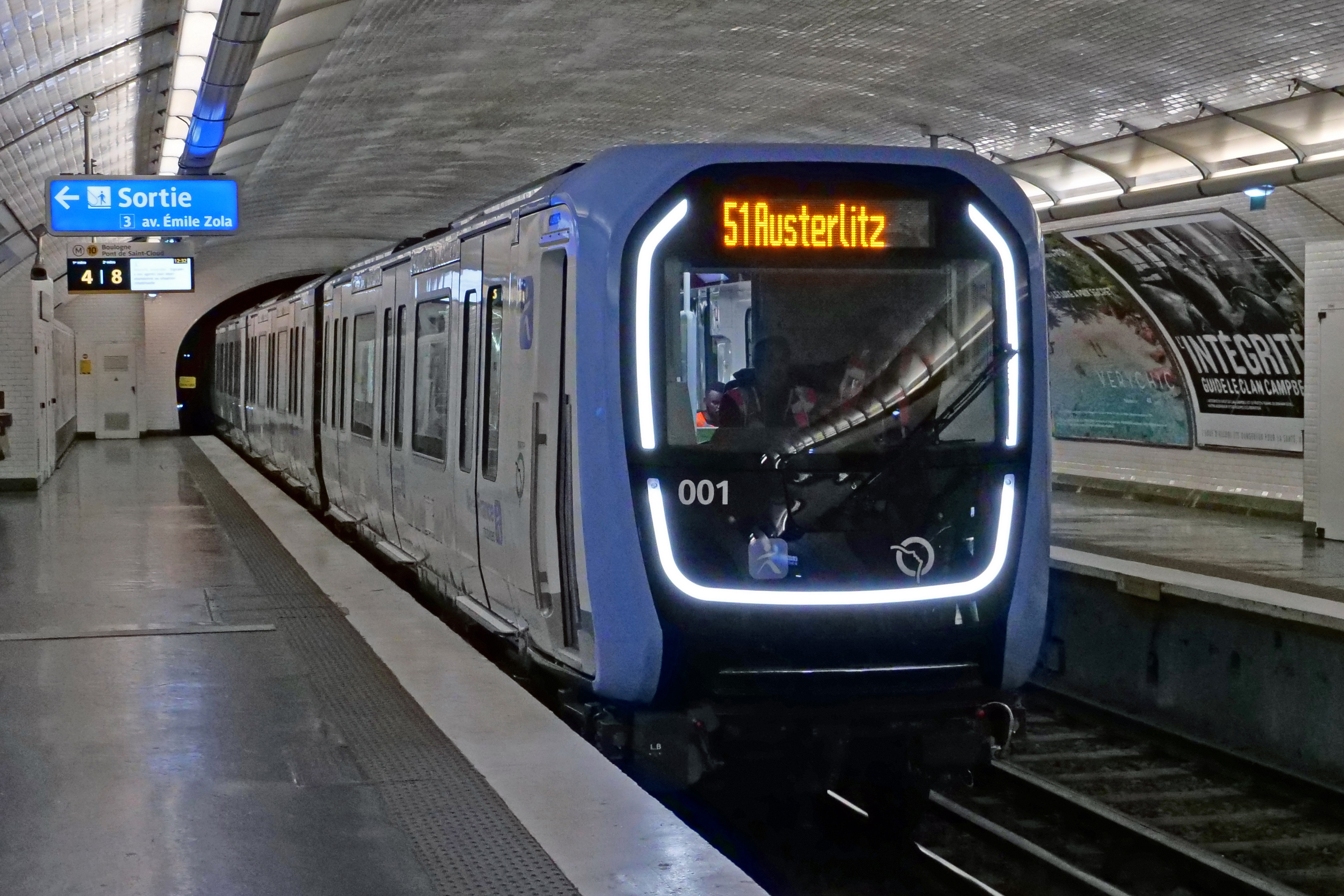
First MF 19 on the station

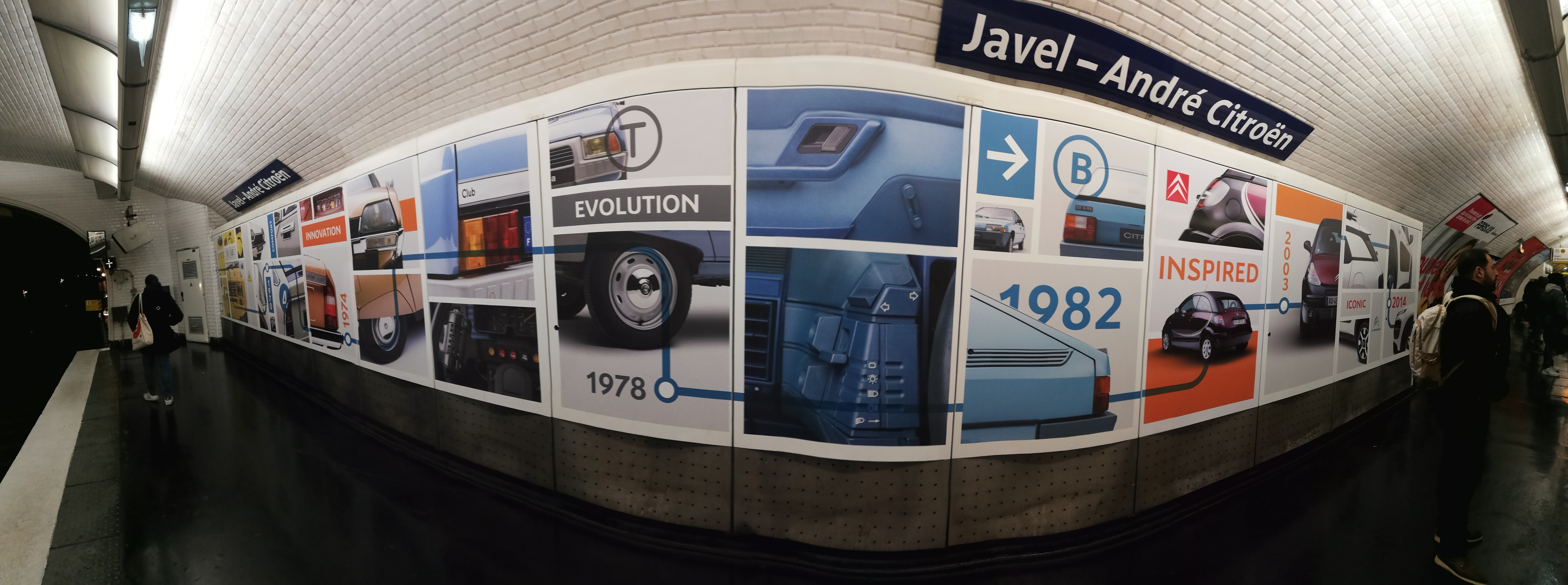
Citroën exhibition along the platforms

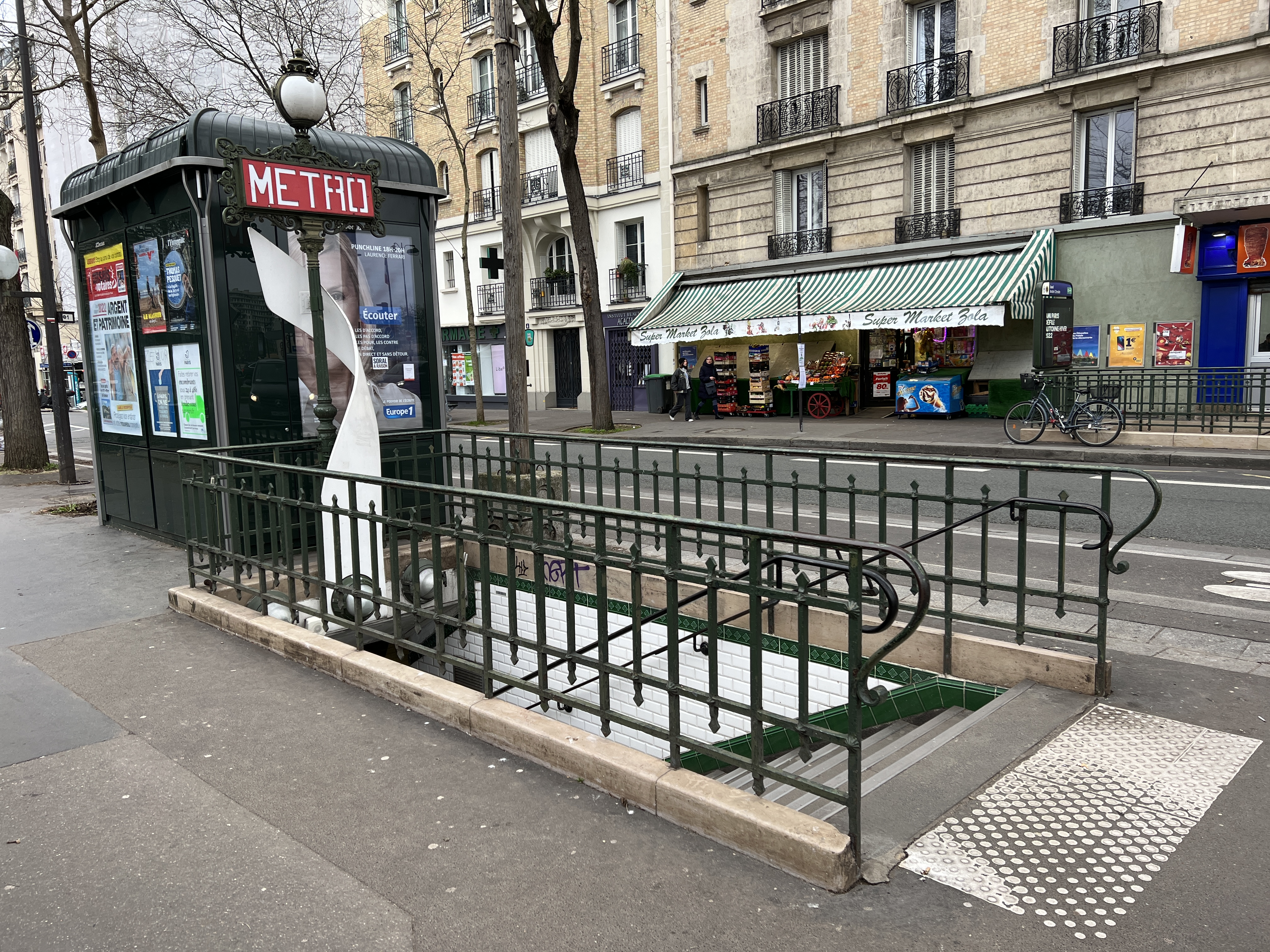
Access 1

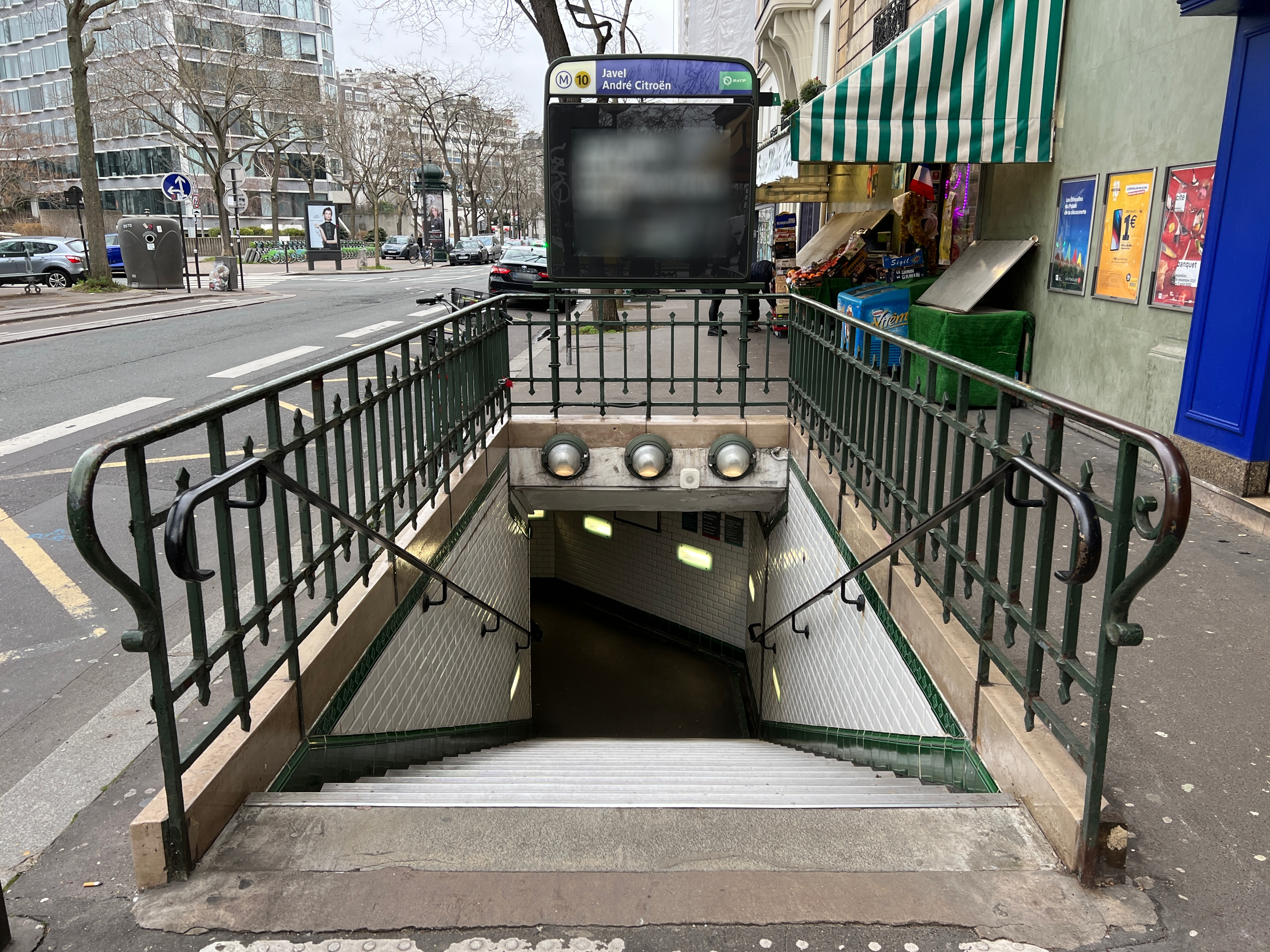
Access 2

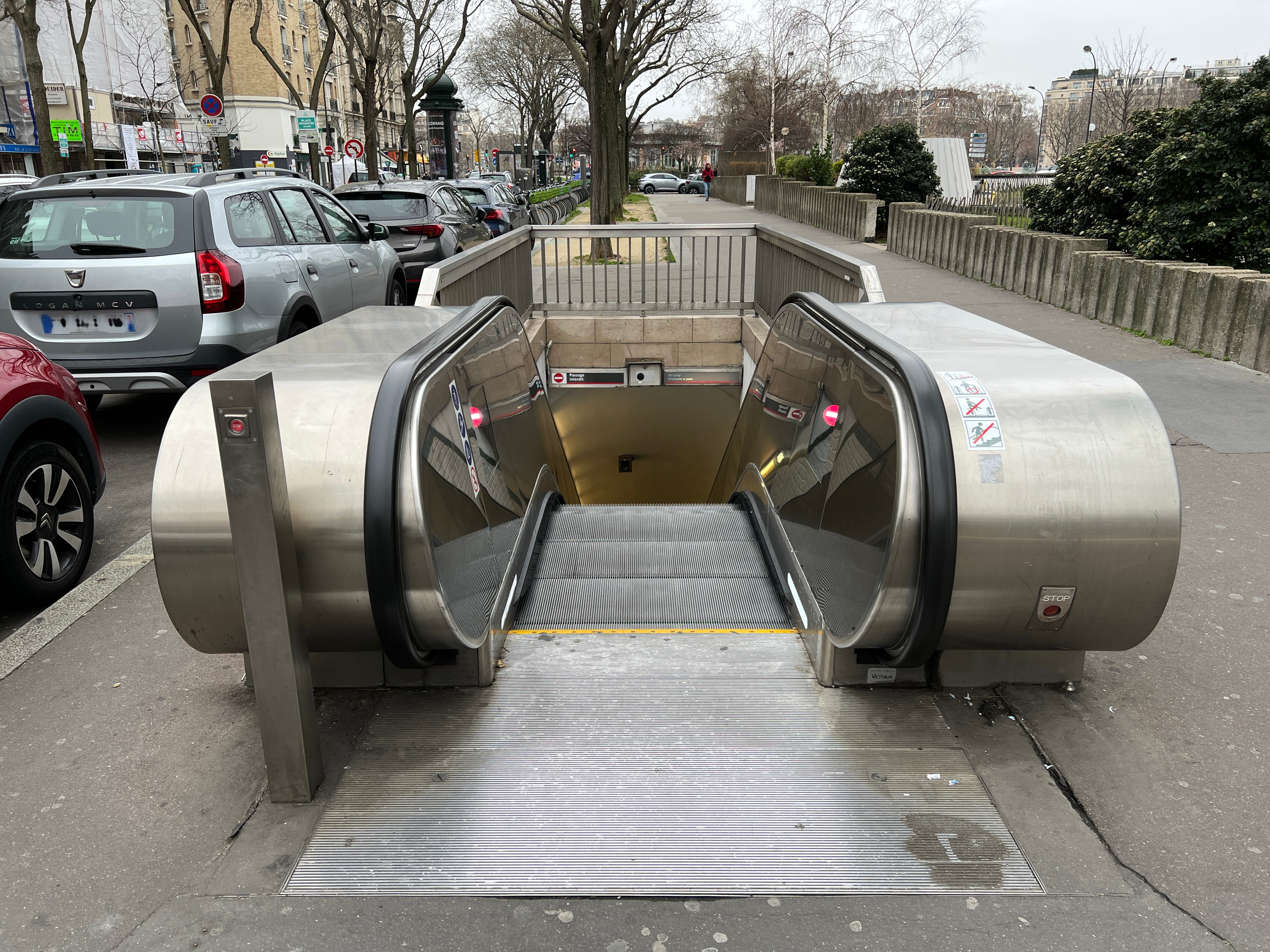
Access 3

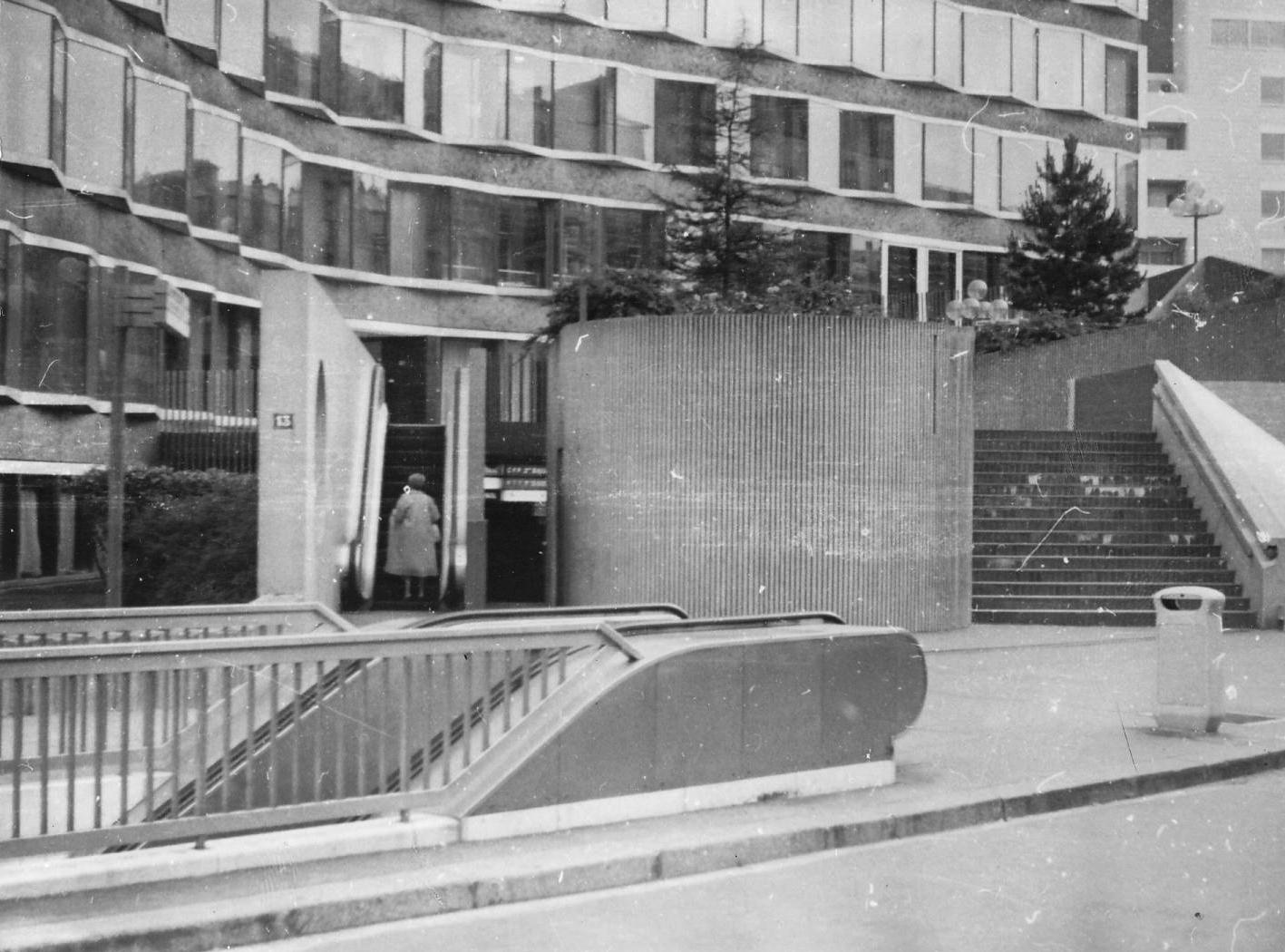
Access 3 in 1981

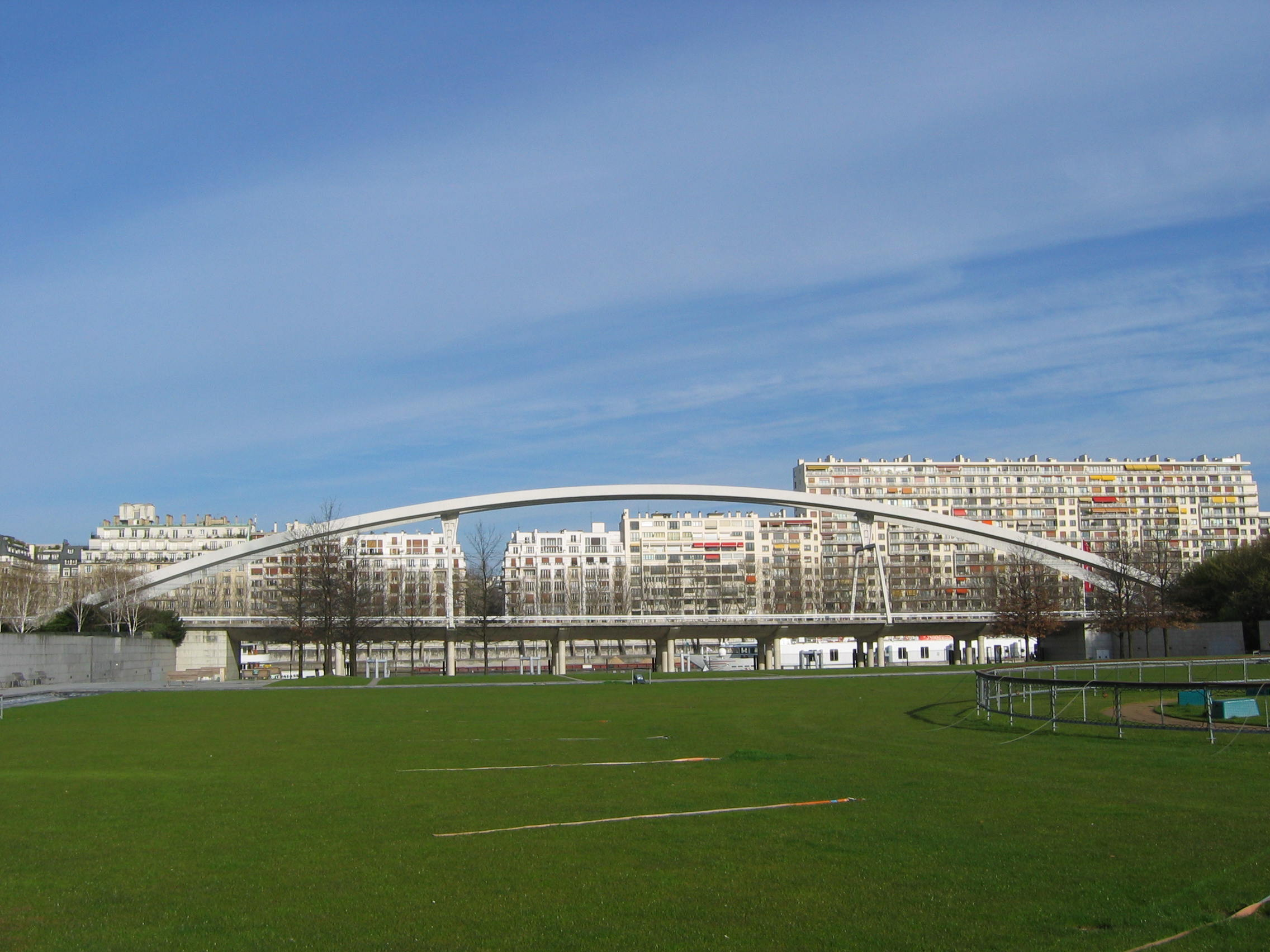
RER C bridge at Parc André Citroën
