= Javel station =

Railway station in Paris, France

Javel
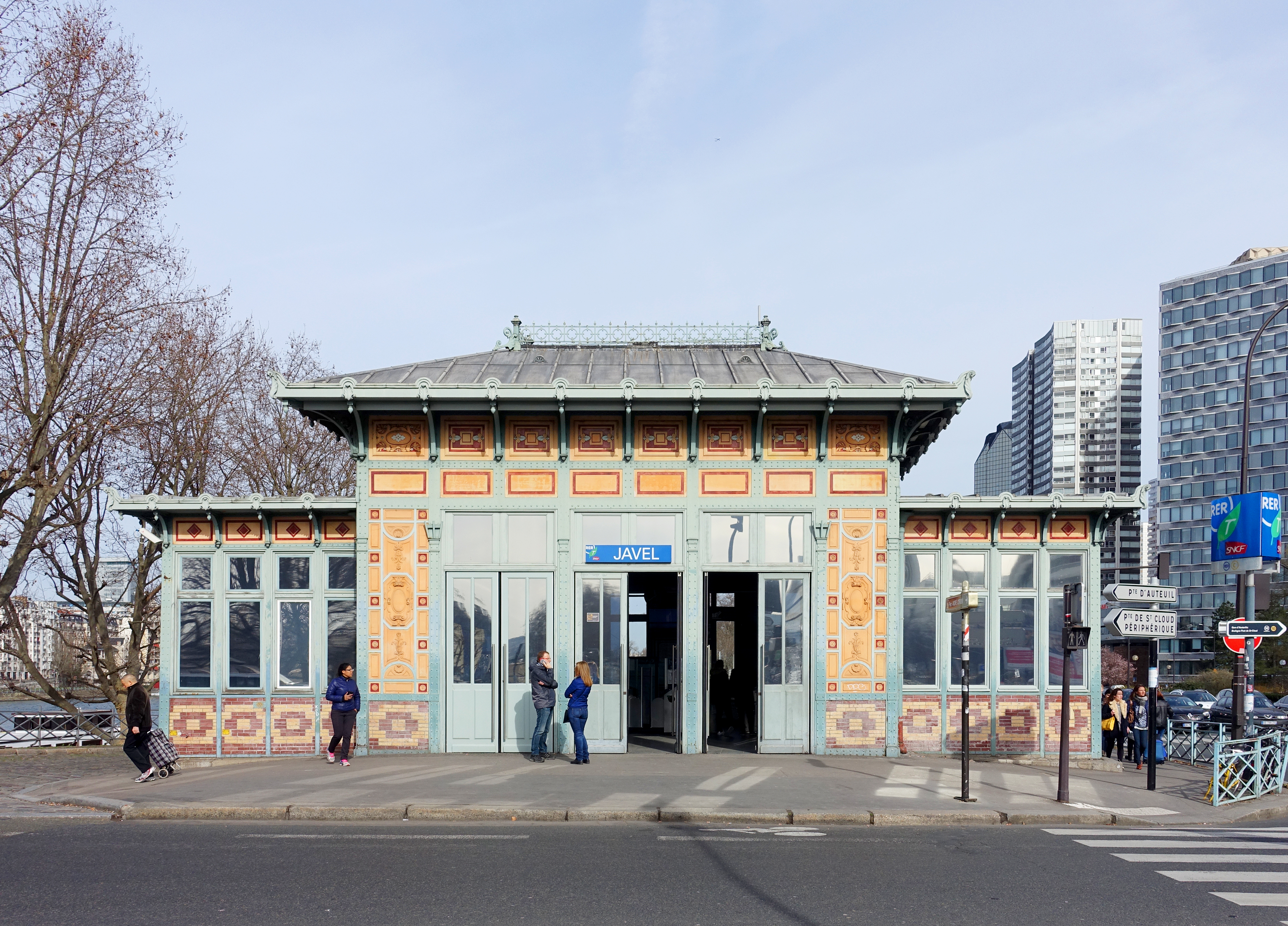
- Station building

General information
- Location: Rond-Point du Pont-Mirabeau; 15th arrondissement of Paris, 75015; France
- Coordinates: 48°50′47″N 2°16′37″E
- System: RER station
- Owner: SNCF Réseau
- Operator: SNCF
Lines
Paris Metro	Line 10
- Platforms: 2 side platforms
- Tracks: 2
- Bus routes: : 30, 62, 88
- Bus operators: RATP

Construction
- Accessible: Yes, by prior reservation
- Architect: Juste Lisch

Other information
- Station code: 87393066
- Fare zone: 1

History
- Opened: 1900

Passengers
- 2024: 3,476,498

Services
Preceding station	RER	Following station
Pont du Garigliano towards Versailles Château Rive Gauche or Saint-Quentin-en-Yvelines	RER C	Champ de Mars–Tour Eiffel towards Massy-Palaiseau, Dourdan-la-Forêt or Saint-Martin-d'Étampes
Location

Javel (French pronunciation: [ʒavɛl]) is a station on RER C in the 15th arrondissement of Paris, by the Pont Mirabeau.

The station is built on a bridge over the railway situated in a cutting. It was built for the 1900 Exposition Universelle. The building is a metal structure filled in with plain bricks on the lower part and decor on the top part. Stone was used to build retainer walls along the two platforms of the station.

Javel is now a station on the RER C line of the Paris express suburban rail system.

== Gallery ==
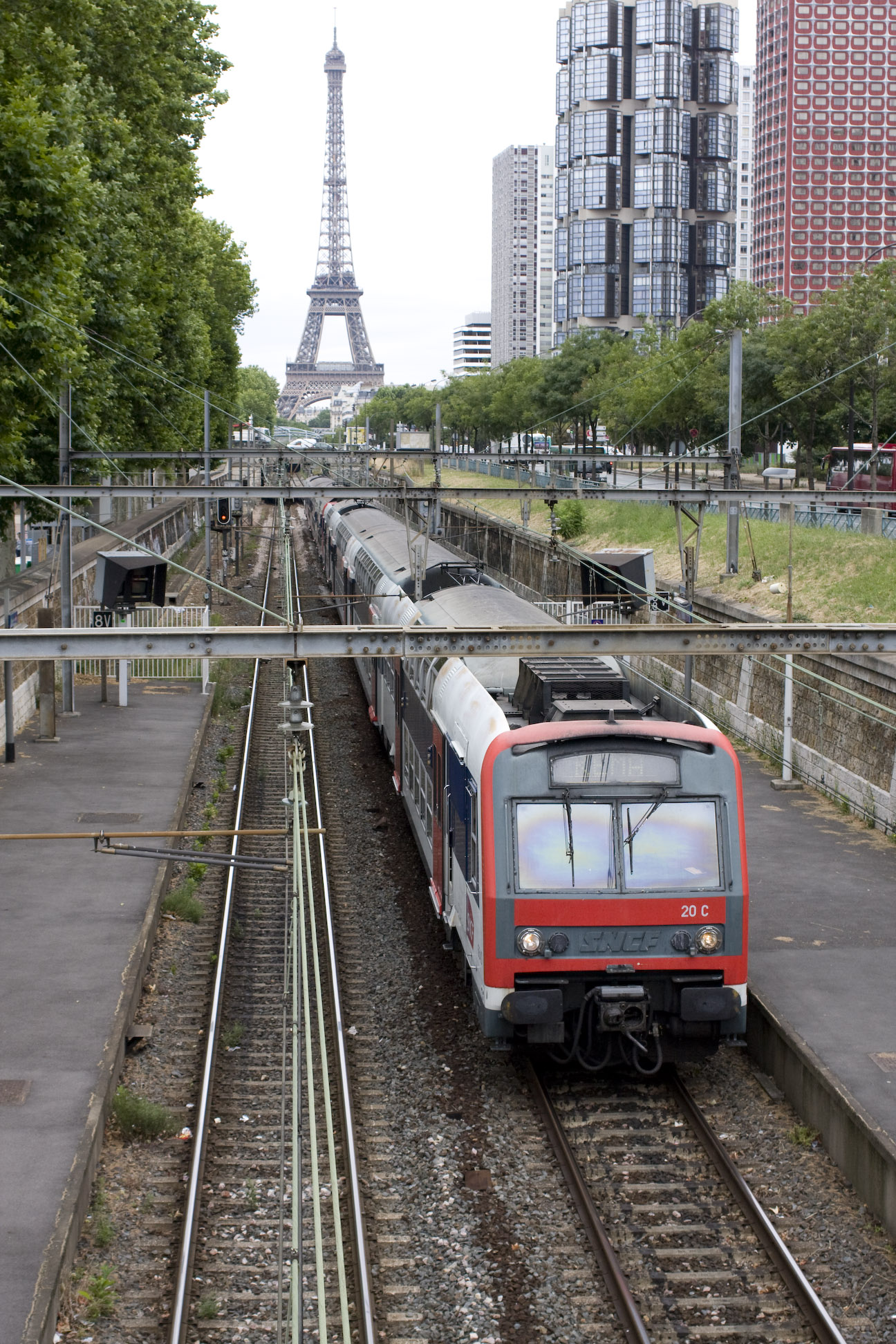
RER train approaching the station

== Adjacent station ==
- Javel–André Citroën on Paris Métro Line 10 is within walking distance.

== Tourism ==
- Parc André Citroën

== See also ==
- List of stations of the Paris RER
- List of stations of the Paris Métro
- Javel, Paris
