= Église d'Auteuil station =

Metro station in Paris, France

Coordinates: 48°50′50″N 2°16′08″E

Église d'Auteuil
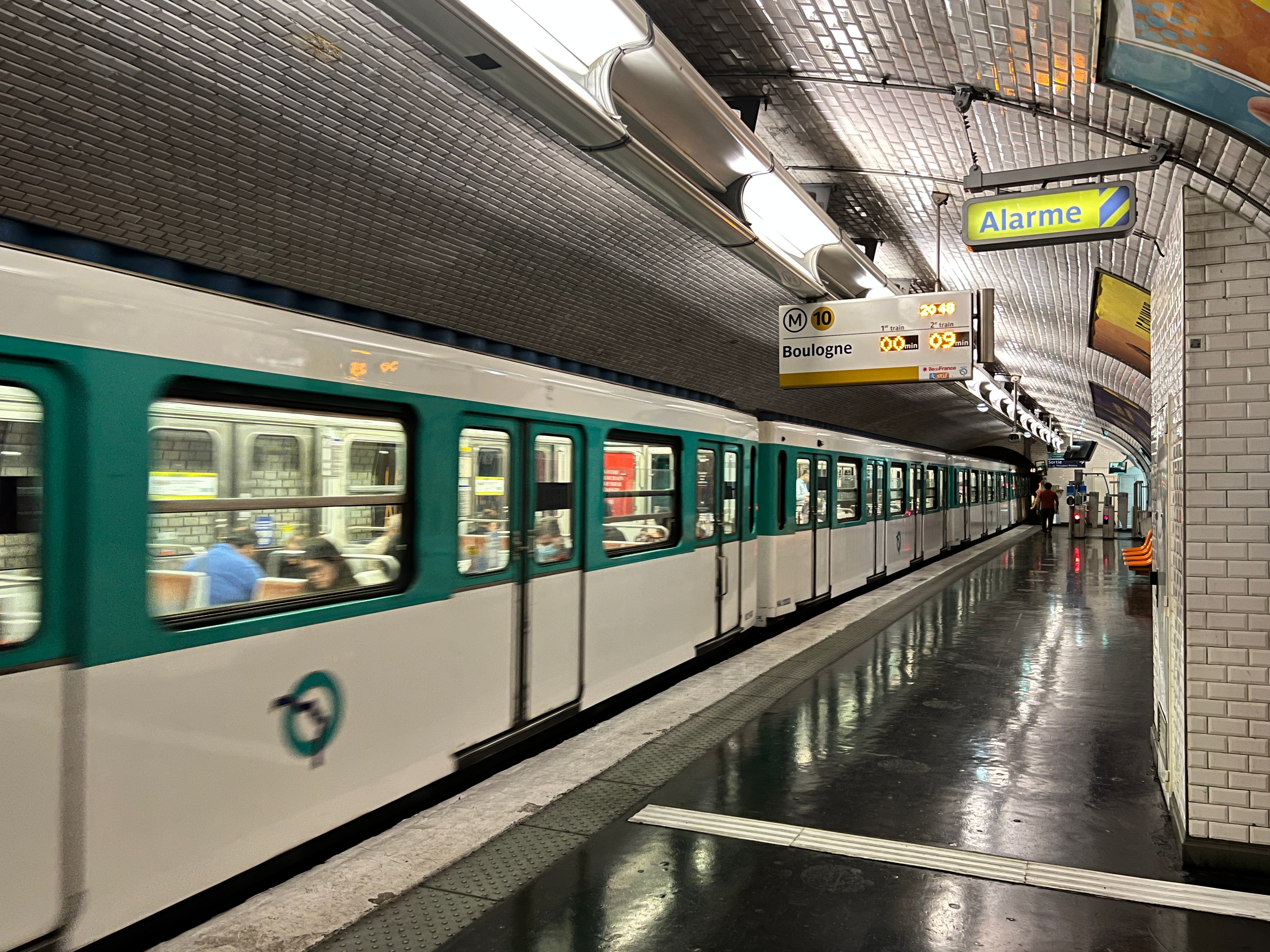
- Platform at Église d'Auteuil

General information
- Location: Place Théodore Rivière; 16th arrondissement of Paris; Île-de-France; France
- System: Paris Metro station
- Owner: RATP
- Line: Paris Metro Paris Metro Line 10
- Platforms: 1 side platform
- Tracks: 1

Other information
- Station code: 0708

History
- Opened: 30 September 1913

Passengers
- 2021: 124,941

Services
Preceding station	Paris Metro	Following station
Michel-Ange–Auteuil towards Boulogne–Pont de Saint-Cloud	Line 10 Westbound only	Javel–André Citroën One-way operation
Location

Église d'Auteuil (French pronunciation: [eɡliz dotœj]; lit. 'Auteuil Church') is a station of the Paris Metro in the 16th arrondissement, serving Line 10 (westbound service only). With around 124,941 passenger entrances in 2021, it is the least-entered station on the Paris Metro network. However, because this station serves westbound passengers only, and the RATP only records station entrances and not exits, it is possible that more passengers exit at Église d'Auteuil than enter.

== Location ==
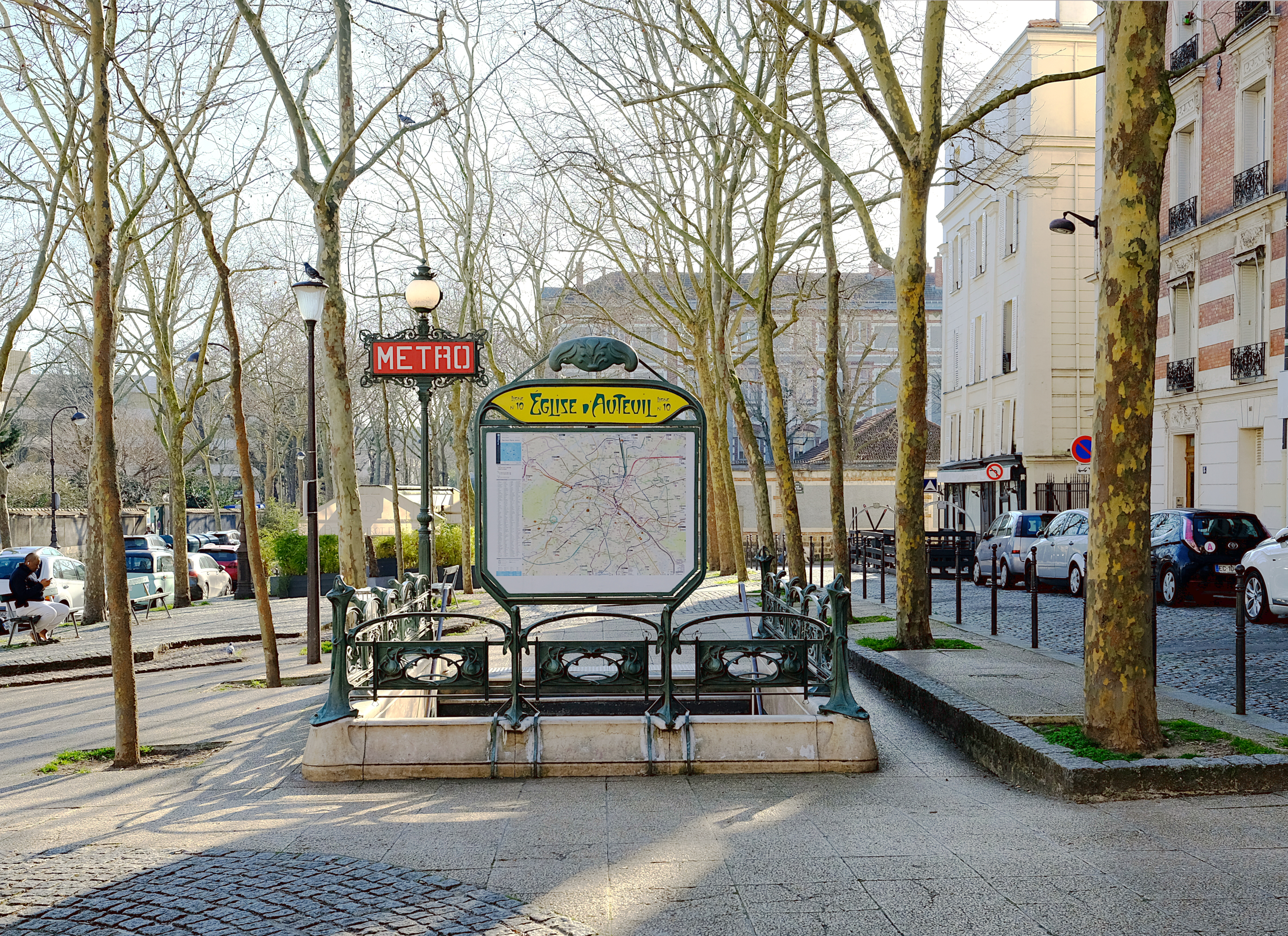
Entrance to Église d'Auteuil station

Église d'Auteuil is located in the neighbourhood of Auteuil, one of the westernmost localities in Paris's city proper. There are two access points: both an entrance and exit are available at the Place de Théodore Rivière, while an exit exists on Rue Wilhem at its intersection with Avenue Théophile Gautier.

Église d'Auteuil is located very close to Mirabeau station; the two stations can be considered twins, with Église d'Auteuil serving westbound traffic and Mirabeau serving eastbound traffic, but they each have separate entrances and exits.

== History ==
The station opened on 30 September 1913 as part of the extension of Line 8 from Beaugrenelle (now Charles Michels) to Porte d'Auteuil. On 29 July 1937, Line 10 was extended from Duroc to La Motte-Picquet–Grenelle and the section of Line 8 between La Motte-Picquet–Grenelle and Porte d'Auteuil, including Église d'Auteuil, was transferred to Line 10.

This station was named Wilhem until 15 May 1921. Wilhem was the pseudonym of a French musician, Guillaume Louis Bocquillon Wilhem. However, a municipal councillor became convinced that the station was actually named for Kaiser Wilhelm II of Germany and so the station was renamed following World War I after a nearby church, Notre-Dame d'Auteuil.

== Station layout ==
Street Level

B1	Mezzanine

Single platform	Side platform, doors will open on the right
Single platform	Westbound	← toward Boulogne–Pont de Saint-Cloud (Michel-Ange–Auteuil) (No service eastbound: Javel–André Citroën)

== Gallery ==
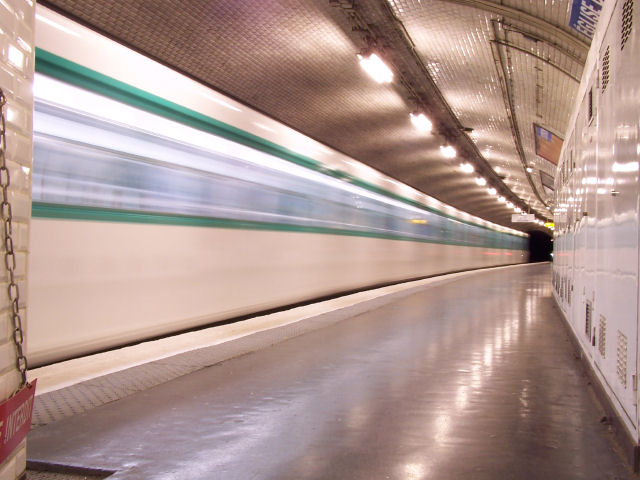
MF 67 rolling stock on Line 10 at Église d'Auteuil
