= Michel-Ange–Auteuil station =

Metro station in Paris, France

Michel-Ange–Auteuil
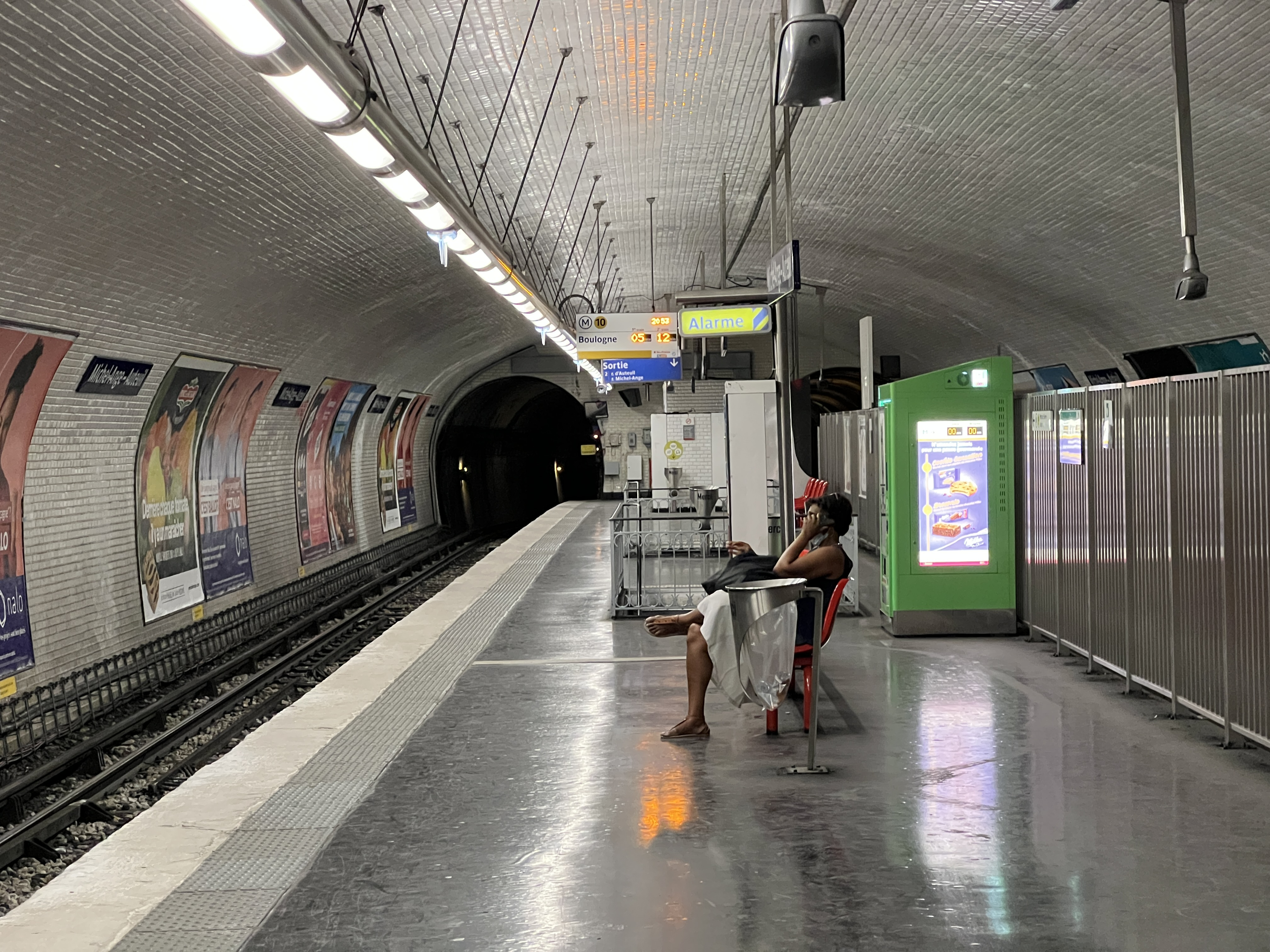
- Line 10 platform at Michel-Ange–Auteuil

General information
- Location: 16th arrondissement of Paris; Île-de-France; France
- Coordinates: 48°50′51″N 2°15′49″E
- System: Paris Métro station
- Owner: RATP
- Operator: RATP
- Line: Paris Metro Paris Metro Line 9 Paris Metro Line 10
- Platforms: 3 (1 island platform, 2 side platforms)
- Tracks: 4

Construction
- Accessible: no

Other information
- Station code: 07-09
- Fare zone: 1

History
- Opened: 30 September 1913

Passengers
- 1,512,050 (2021)

Services
Preceding station	Paris Metro	Following station
Michel-Ange–Molitor towards Pont de Sèvres	Line 9	Jasmin towards Mairie de Montreuil
Porte d'Auteuil towards Boulogne–Pont de Saint-Cloud	Line 10 Westbound only	Église d'Auteuil One-way operation
Location
- Location within Paris

Michel-Ange–Auteuil (French pronunciation: [mikɛlɑ̃ʒ otœj]) is a station of the Paris Métro in the 16th arrondissement, serving as an interchange between line 9 and line 10 (westbound only). It is named after the nearby rue Michel-Ange, which was in turn named after Michelangelo (the nearby Michel-Ange—Molitor station was also named after him) as well as the nearby rue Auteuil, which was named after the former village of Auteuil (it used to be its main street). The Embassy of the Central African Republic is located nearby.

== History ==
The station opened on 30 September 1913 when line 8 was extended from Beaugrenelle (now Charles Michels) to Porte d'Auteuil. Line 9's platforms opened on 8 November 1922 with the opening of the initial section of the line from Trocadéro to Exelmans. On 27 July 1937, the section of line 8 between La Motte-Picquet–Grenelle and Porte d'Auteuil, including Michel-Ange–Auteuil was transferred to line 10 during the reconfiguration of lines 8, 10, and the old line 14. However, service between Porte d'Auteuil and Jussieu was not provided until two days later on July 29, with service initially limited to La Motte-Picquet-Grenelle.

As part of the "Renouveau du métro" programme by the RATP, the station's corridors and lights were renovated and modernised on 6 December 2002.

In 2019, the station was used by 2,042,174 passengers, making it the 243rd busiest of the Métro network out of 302 stations.

In 2020, the station was used by 1,131,814 passengers amidst the COVID-19 pandemic, making it the 230th busiest of the Métro network out of 305 stations.

In 2021, the station was used by 1,512,050 passengers, making it the 233rd busiest of the Métro network out of 305 stations.

== Passenger services ==
=== Access ===
The station has 2 accesses:

- Access 1: place Jean-Lorrain (with a rare Val d'Osne totem)
- Access 2: rue d'Auteuil (with an ascending escalator)

=== Station layout ===
Street Level
B1	Mezzanine
Line 10 platform	Westbound	No regular service (No service northbound: Jasmin)
Line 10 platform	Island platform, doors will open on the right
Line 10 platform	Westbound	← toward Boulogne–Pont de Saint-Cloud (Porte d'Auteuil) (No service eastbound: Église d'Auteuil)
Line 9 platforms	Side platform, doors will open on the right
Line 9 platforms	Westbound	← toward Pont de Sèvres (Michel-Ange–Molitor)
Line 9 platforms	Eastbound	toward Mairie de Montreuil (Jasmin)→
Line 9 platforms	Side platform, doors will open on the right

=== Platforms ===
The platforms of line 9, with a conventional length of seventy-five metres, are of standard configuration. Two of them, separated by the metro tracks located in the centre and the vault is elliptical. The decoration is in the Andreu-Motte style with two orange light rails, benches and corridor openings treated in flat brown tiles and orange Motte seats. These fittings are combined with the bevelled white ceramic tiles that cover the walls, the vault, and the tunnel exits. The advertising frames are made of honey-coloured earthenware with plant motifs and the name of the station is also incorporated into the wall tiles, in the interwar decorative style of the original CMP.

It is one of the few stations to still present the Andreu-Motte style in its entirety, except for the tunnel exits (which were not systematically treated with flat coloured tiles).

The station of line 10 has a particular configuration due to its location on the section of the Auteuil loop. It has two tracks framing an island platform, also of a classic length of seventy-five meters, which is only served in the direction of Boulogne - Pont de Saint-Cloud, all under an elliptical vault. Only the south track is dedicated to passenger service, the other being a service connection with line 9, isolated behind a gate running along the entire length of the platform. The decoration is a variant of the style used for most metro stations. The traditional bevelled white ceramic tiles cover the walls, the vault, and the tunnel exits, while the lighting is provided by a suspended tube, off-centre on the side of the main track. The advertising frames are metal, and the name of the station is inscribed in Parisine font on enamelled plaques, attached to the jambs or suspended above the platform. The Akiko style seats are burgundy in colour (replacing red Motte seats).

This decoration is almost identical to that of the neighbouring station of line 10, Michel-Ange - Molitor, located on the other section of the loop.

=== Other connections ===
The station also served by lines 52 and 62 (only in the direction of Porte de France) of the RATP bus network.

== Gallery ==
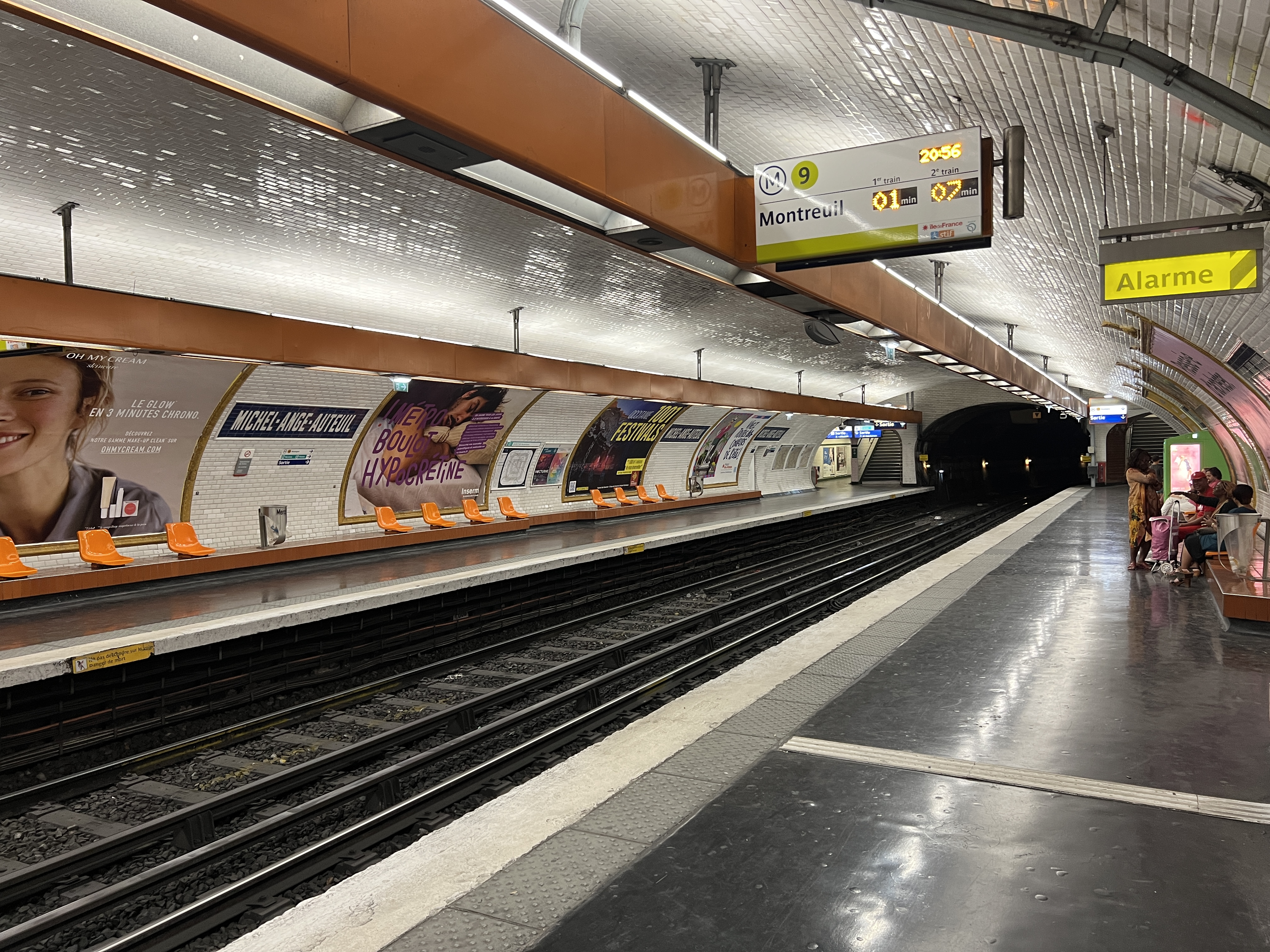
Line 9's platforms at Michel-Ange–Auteuil

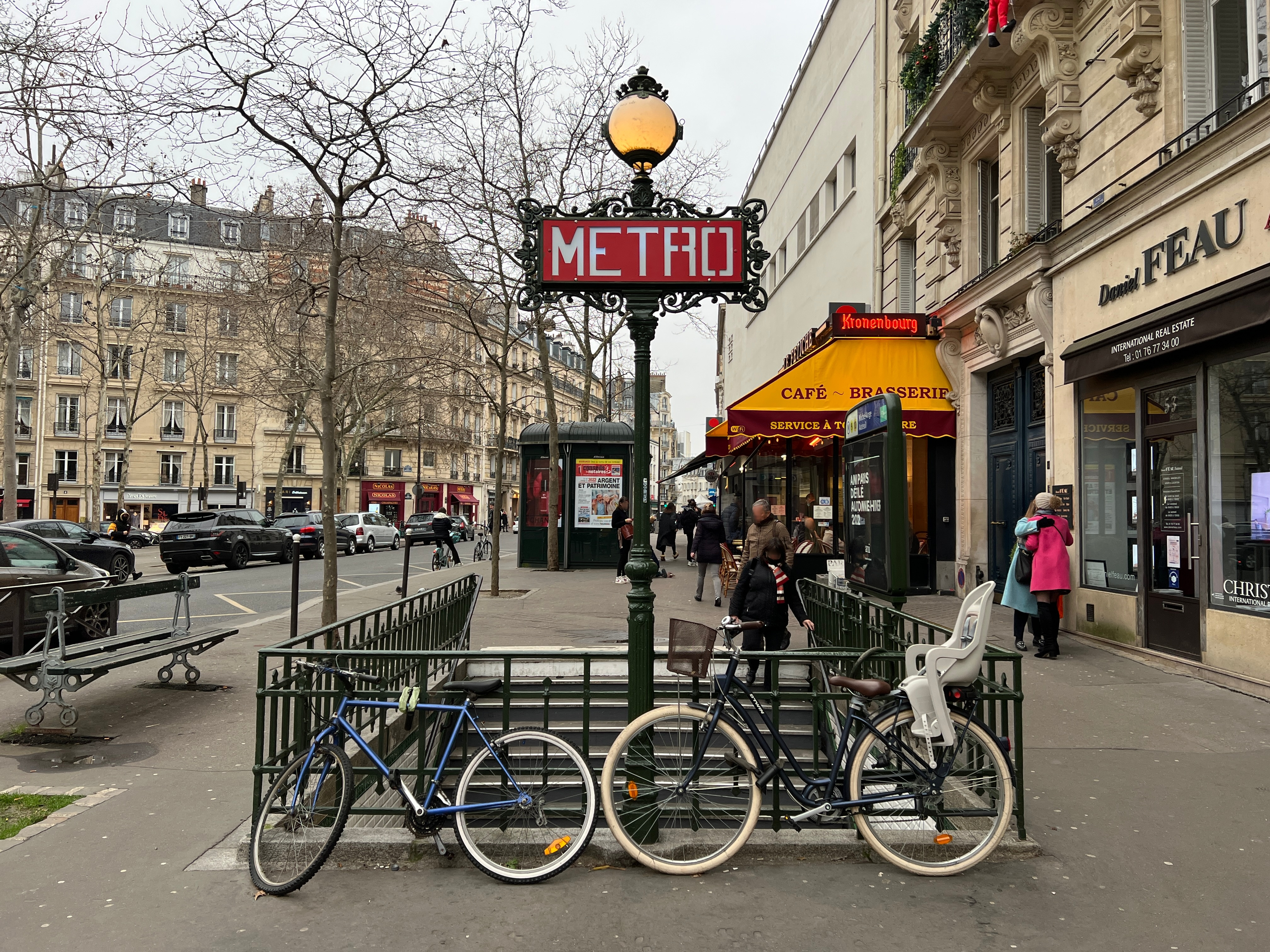
Access 1

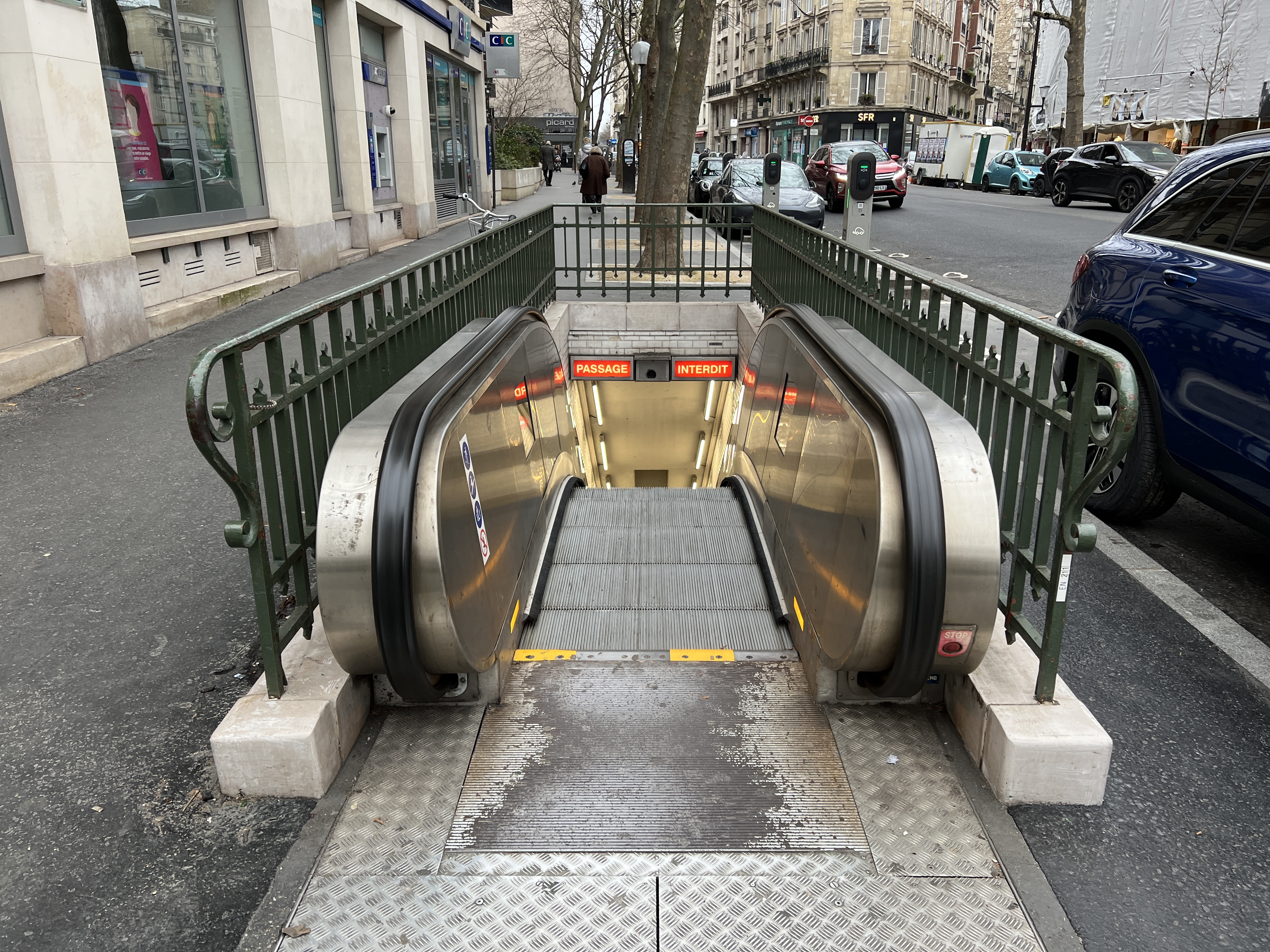
Access 2
