= Javel, Paris =

Javel
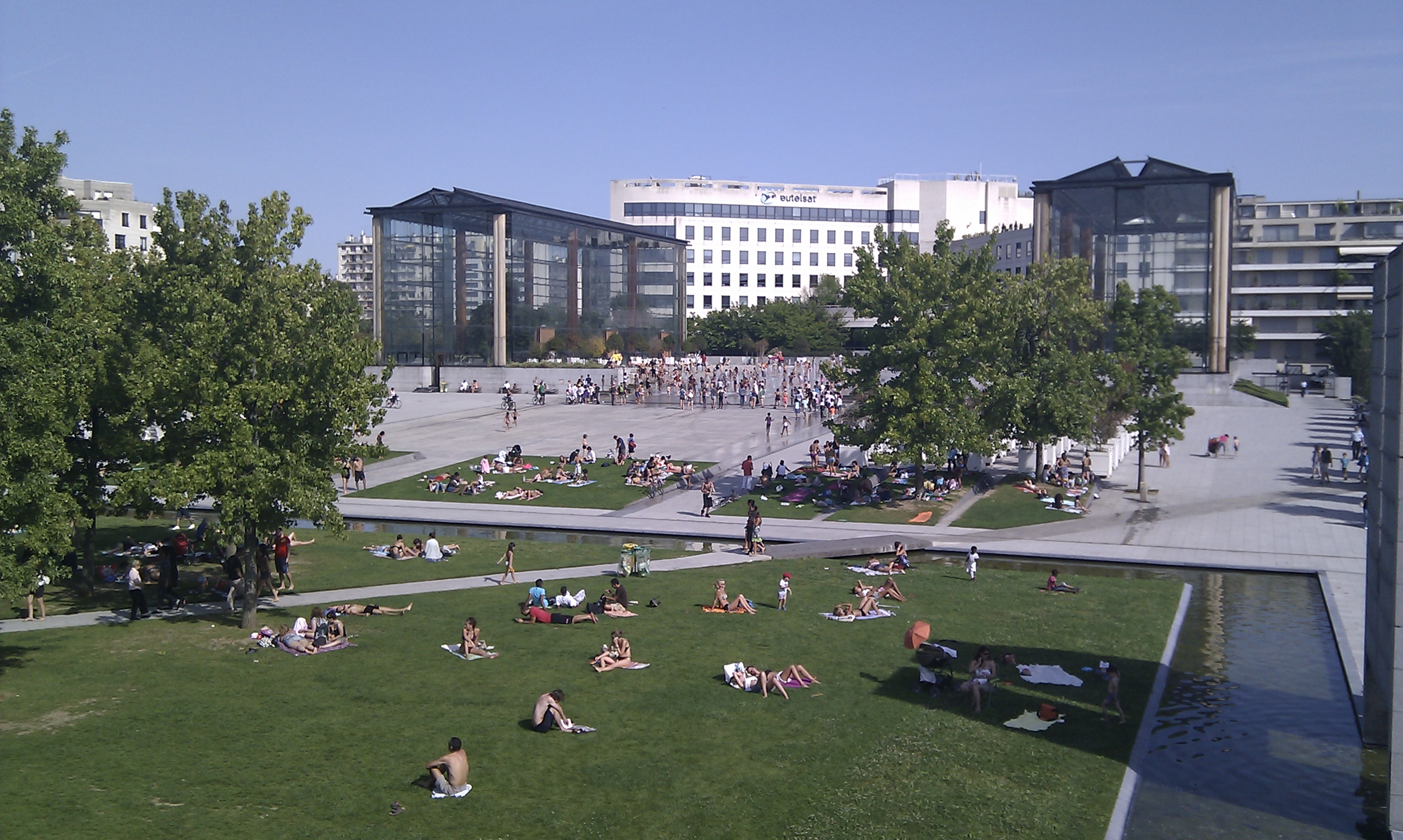
- André Citroën Park

- Location in Paris
- Coordinates: 48°50′28″N 2°16′59″E
- Country: France
- Region: Île-de-France
- City: Paris
- Arrondissement: 15th

Area
  - Total: 2.608 km^{2} (1.007 sq mi)

Population (1999)
  - Total: 49,092
  - Density: 18,816/km^{2} (48,730/sq mi)
- Postal Code: 75015

Javel (French pronunciation: [ʒavɛl]) is the 60th administrative district of Paris situated in the 15th arrondissement.

== Location ==
Neighborhoods (quartiers) of the 15th arrondissement

Situated on 261 hectares, the neighborhood is bordered to the north by Rue Linois and Rue des Entrepreneurs, to the east by Rue de la Croix-Nivert and Rue Lecourbe, to the south by the Paris - Issy-les-Moulineaux heliport, and to the west by the Seine.

== History ==
In the 15th century, the neighborhood was named "Javetz" and situated to the south of the Grenelle plain bordering the Seine and to the west of Paris. The neighborhood was founded as a small port and a boat garage. The region became better known starting in the 17th century for its windmill and its stylish gathering spots frequented by swimmers, fishermen, and boaters.

From the 19th to the 20th century, the name of this place was spelled "Javelle".

Before its annexation to Paris in 1860, it was part of the commune of Issy. Afterwards, it became industrialized with the installation of electric plants (Thomson) and automobile factories (Citroën). The Citroën factories occupied a very large section of the neighborhood until the 1970s-1980s. The plant has been demolished.

In this neighborhood, in a chemical factory founded in 1777, Claude Louis Berthollet studied and produced a disinfectant with a sodium hypochlorite base (bleach), which is known today in French as eau de Javel (literally: "Water from Javel"). Later, other industrial plants were set up in the neighborhood, including that of André Citroën in 1915. The factory was originally a munitions factory designed to support the war effort by the mass production of artillery shells. Following World War I, André Citroën used his experience in automobile construction acquired in the Mors factories, which was headquartered at 48 Rue du Théâtre. He applied the principles of Henry Ford after having discovering them on a trip to Detroit in 1913 and meeting Henry Ford. The factory in Javel was converted to an automobile production facility which went on to produce the first mass-produced European car: the Citroën Type A 10 HP. The automobile factory continued to produce cars until 1975; the last car released by the factory was the Citroën DS. The company's headquarters moved in 1982 and permanently left its historic address at Quai de Javel. The following became named after André Citroën: the André Citroën Park, the Collège André Citroën ("André Citroën secondary school"), and the Quai André-Citroën, formerly the Quai de Javel.

== Principal sites ==
The neighborhood is currently occupied by the Parc André-Citroën, the Hôpital Européen Georges-Pompidou, many large buildings containing offices and television studios (Sagem, Snecma, Direction générale de l'Aviation civile, Canal+, France Télévisions, etc.). The former Hôpital Boucicaut closed at the end of the year 2000; a program consisting of a school, a day care, housing, and a public park are in the process of being created while preserving the memory of the site and its architectural heritage.

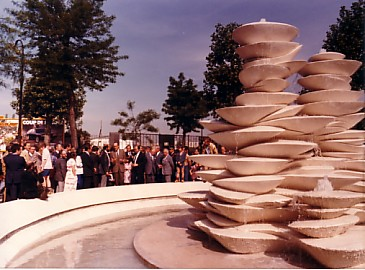
Polypores Fountain. Jean-Yves Lechevallier

The headquarters of the Imprimerie nationale, formerly at Rue de la Convention, closed in 2005. The site is now occupied by various offices of the Ministry of Foreign and European Affairs.

The following sites are found within the Javel neighborhood: the port de Javel, the Rue de Javel, the église Saint-Christophe-de-Javel, the Polypores fountain by Jean-Yves Lechevallier featured in the movie "Same Old Song" by Alain Resnais, the Gare de Javel on the C line of the RER, and the métro station Javel-André Citroën on the 10 line.

Additionally, to south of the Boulevard Périphérique is a small section of the 15th arrondissement that was formerly a parade ground and then an airfield (at the beginning of the 20th century), but which is now occupied by the Paris - Issy-les-Moulineaux heliport, a sports complex (the Parc omnisport Suzanne-Lenglen), a recreational center (Aquaboulevard) and a small housing community called Les Frères-Voisin.

== Transportation ==
Javel is served by the RATP. The neighborhood is served by the RER C and lines 8, 10, and 12 of the métro. The neighborhood has in recent years been serviced by the newly constructed tramway line 2 and line 3a.

== Demographics ==
- Population of the Javel neighborhood (area: 260.9 hectares/644.7 acres):

Year	Population	Density (residents per km^{2})	Annual change since last census
1861	4,052	1,553.68	creation
1954	43,480	16,671.78	+10.46%
1962	46,323	17,761.89	+0.82%
1968	45,906	17,601.99	-0.15%
1975	45,055	17,275.69	-0.26%
1982	44,776	17,168.71	-0.09%
1990	47,352	18,156.44	+0.72%
1999	49,092	18,156.44	+0.41%

== See also ==
- Historical quarters of Paris
- 15th arrondissement of Paris
- Eau de Javel
- Gare de Javel
- Church of Saint-Christophe-de-Javel (fr)
- Paris - Issy-les-Moulineaux Heliport (fr)
