= Rue du Commerce, Paris =

Street in Paris, France

Rue du Commerce
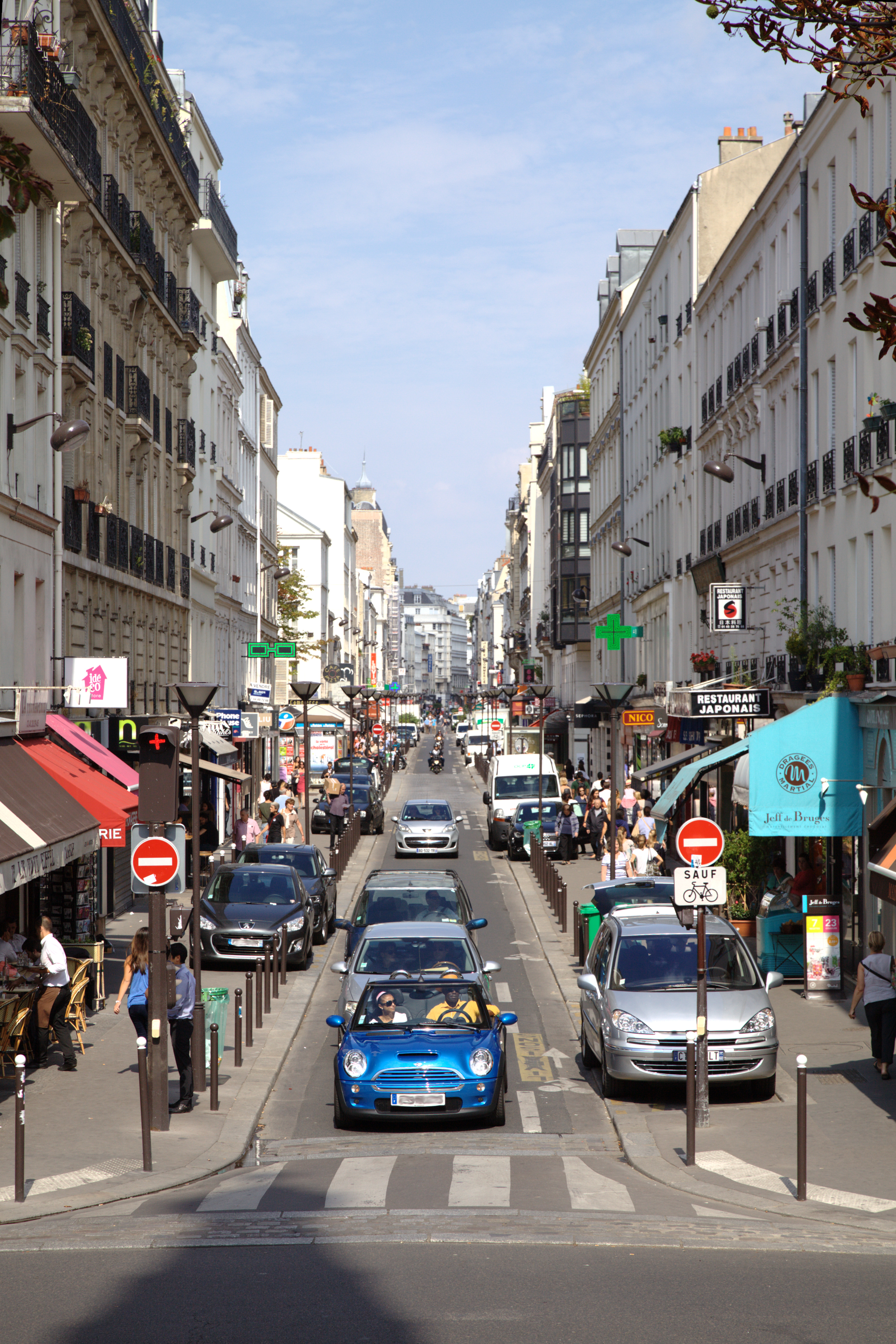
- Interactive map of Rue du Commerce
- Type: Street
- Length: 675 m (2,215 ft)
- Arrondissement: 15th
- Quarter: Grenelle

The Rue du Commerce (French pronunciation: [ʁy dy kɔmɛʁs]) is a street in the 15th arrondissement of Paris.

== Location and access ==
The Rue du Commerce begins on the Boulevard de Grenelle, at the elevated metro level, in the extension of the Avenue de La Motte-Picquet and ends on the Rue des Entrepreneurs. Lined with buildings that are often modest but not devoid of refinement and whose ensemble shows a certain unity, the Rue du Commerce has been a lively and attractive shopping area of the 15th arrondissement since the middle of the 19th century.

It is crossed by the Rue Letellier, Rue Fondary and Rue du Théâtre. It serves as the starting point for the Rue Tiphaine, Rue Frémicourt, Rue Gramme and Rue Lakanal, but also as the point of arrival for the Avenue Émile-Zola.

Its length is 675 m for an average width of only 18 m. Because of this narrow width, it is a one-way street for car traffic. Recent developments also limit the parking of vehicles.

This site is served by metro stations: Commerce, Avenue Émile-Zola, and La Motte-Picquet–Grenelle.

== Name origin ==
It bears this name because it was the main shopping street of the former commune of Grenelle.

== History ==
The Rue du Commerce, which was the main shopping street of the former commune of Grenelle, was formed in 1837 under the name of Rue Saint-Guillaume.

Classified in the Parisian road system under the decree of May 23, 1863, it took the name of Rue de la Montagne-Noire on February 1, 1877 before taking its current name by an order of March 16, 1877.

=== The Violet subdivision and the birth of the modern Rue du Commerce ===
The Rue du Commerce is the result of an urban planning operation carried out in the 19th century. In 1824, the real estate entrepreneurs Léonard Violet and Alphonse Letellier, then municipal councilors of the former village of Vaugirard, acquired vast land of nearly 105 hectares on the territory of the commune, with a view to subdividing them. Named Beaugrenelle not without ambition by its founders, then renamed more modestly after its original name Grenelle, the Violet subdivision estate, of exceptional scale, was built between the Seine and the Rue de la Croix-Nivert, and to the north up to the Wall of the Ferme générale.

Around the central axis of the Rue du Commerce and a new square, Violet has laid out a unique plot of its kind of checkerboard streets, the largest in all of Paris. The construction of the Église Saint-Jean-Baptiste de Grenelle in 1825, offered to the inhabitants by Violet, of the Pont de Grenelle in 1826, the development of a port on the Seine for traffic by waterway and a train station river intended to store the goods, as well as the realization of the Théâtre de Grenelle in 1829, completed this ensemble organized into a global network.

The facades of the houses and apartment buildings decorated with sculpted motifs, bands and cornices corresponded to the tastes of the middle class that the entrepreneurs sought to attract to this new district. They follow precise construction rules that still allow them to be dated today. Attached to Paris by the Thiers wall from 1844, the Violet subdivision estate, after rapid growth, had to however face competition from the Grands Boulevards and the new districts of the 16th arrondissement.

=== The annexation of Grenelle and the link to Paris of the Rue du Commerce ===
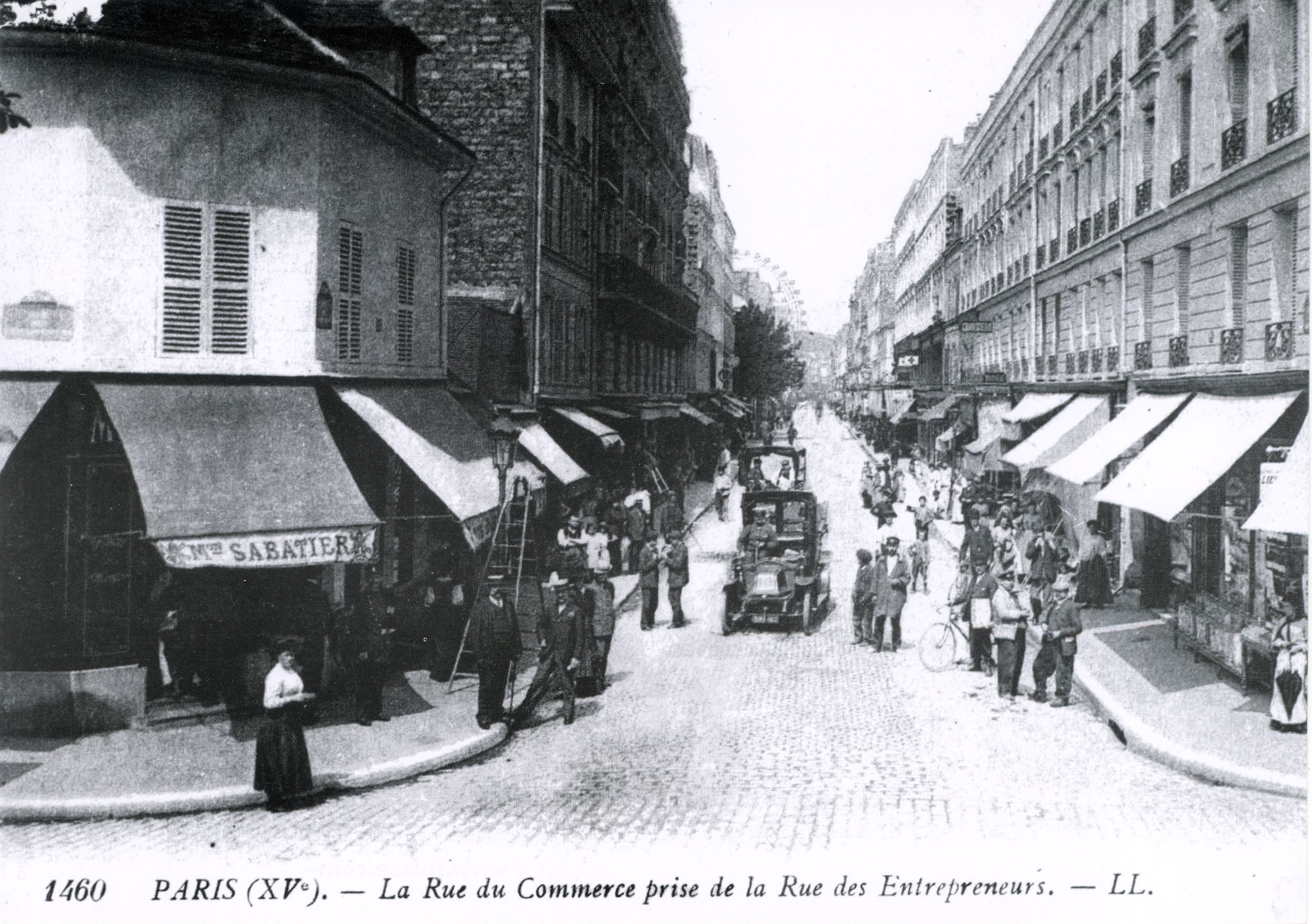
Rue du Commerce from the church, c. 1910

The annexation of the lands of the plain of Grenelle in Paris in 1860, by opening up new possibilities for building, marked a new stage in its growth. The opening of the Rue Frémicourt, then its extension in 1905 by the Avenue Émile-Zola, created new links between the Grenelle district and the rest of Paris, which was in full development. However, the Rue du Commerce retained much of its original character, in part thanks to the strong presence of activities on the ground floor of the buildings bordering the street.

The decree of February 1, 1877 changed its name to the Rue de la Montagne Noire, but the name Rue du Commerce was restored a month later by the decree of March 16, 1877.

In 1909, a petition (not followed up) called for the demolition of the Église Saint-Jean-Baptiste de Grenelle and its reconstruction on neighboring land to allow the junction of the Rue du Commerce and the Avenue Félix-Faure. Between 1924 and 1926, the church underwent major renovations and reconstructions that profoundly changed its appearance.

=== The works of the years 1990-2000 and their consequences on the district ===
From the 1990s, private real estate programs aimed to renovate, rehabilitate or rebuild the commercial and residential spaces of Violet-era buildings on the Rue du Commerce. The spirit of these programs was that of respecting a certain architectural unity of the district. The first phase of rehabilitation concerned the upper part of the street, at the Place du Commerce, in particular no. 87 where Sephora replaced the second Monoprix. The second phase of these programs concerned the bottom of the street where a building was completely destroyed and rebuilt in a style faithful to that of the district.

In support of this movement, following studies, major public urban renovation works were carried out on the Rue du Commerce between 2004 and 2006. Pedestrian spaces were redeveloped and enlarged, the route of the roadway was modified, particularly at the intersection with the Avenue Émile-Zola and the Rue Fondary, two-wheel parking lots have been created and the possibilities for car parking in the Rue du Commerce itself have been reduced.

Traders may have feared at the start that the strengthening of the status of the Rue du Commerce, as a de facto semi-pedestrian street, could have negative consequences on logistics, passage in the street and sales. However, in the spring of 2008, the consequences of the works were, according to all parties, beneficial, and traffic in the street and the neighborhood increased markedly in 2007-2008 due to the widening of the sidewalks, new signs and the embellishment of the street.

== Neighborhood sociology ==
As a result of private and public investments in town planning and buildings on the Rue du Commerce and neighboring streets (Place du Commerce, Rue Mademoiselle, Rue Lakanal, and Rue Violet), the district has seen its price per square meter increase more quickly than the average of the 15th arrondissement over the last ten years. The sociology of the Rue du Commerce has undergone changes since the end of the 1990s, with the deaths of a large number of retired residents of the neighborhood and the arrival of a population of first-time buyers, single or with family, and of CSP+ tenants.

== Activities ==
Today, the Rue du Commerce is still an important shopping street with numerous perfume, lingerie, clothing, tableware, decoration and gift shops, bank branches, a few restaurants and cafes including the famous Café du Commerce at no. 51, as well as food shops (bakeries, butchers, etc.).

It includes the Commerce station of Paris Métro Line 8 at the Place du Commerce. The Avenue Émile Zola station on line 10 is located on the Avenue Émile-Zola, 20 meters from the intersection with the Rue du Commerce.

The Square Yvette-Chauviré provides a useful green space for bowlers, Sunday walkers and local children.

== Remarkable buildings and places of memory ==
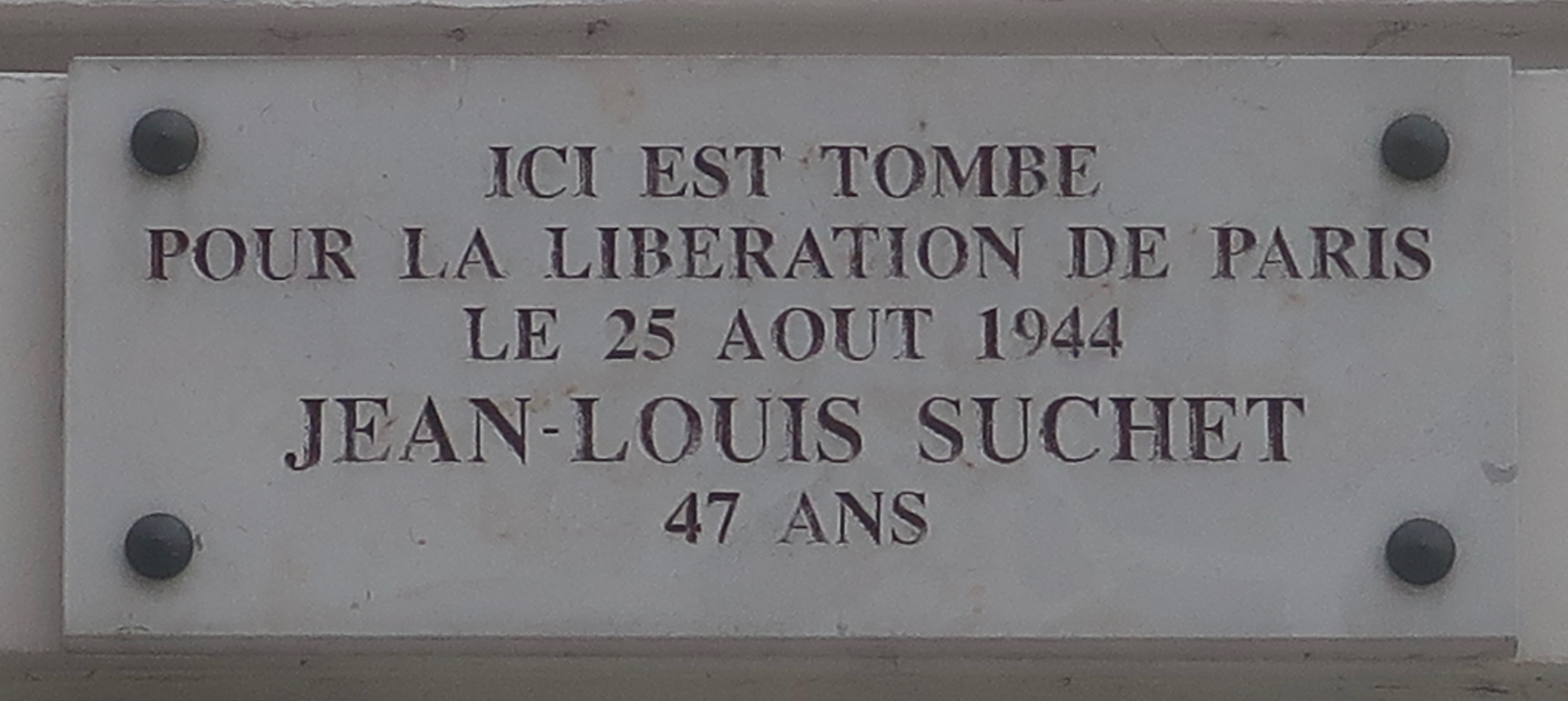
Plaque at no. 93 in homage to Jean-Louis Suchet, killed during the liberation of Paris (1944)

The Rue du Commerce, perfectly straight, offers a 675 m long perspective punctuated on the northeast side by the elevated metro viaduct and dominated on the southwest side by the Saint-Jean-Baptiste church, built in 1825. In addition to this building visible from any point of the street, numerous buildings offer remarkable architecture:

- No. 93: very significant building from 1876 which takes up the size and aesthetics of the first constructions in Grenelle;
- No. 87: building from 1860, with a beautiful cast iron gate and a articulation preserved molding;
- Nos. 82 and 86: construction from the period 1845-1862, comprising moldings and retractable wooden louvers, typical of the period;
- No. 75: building interesting for its volumetry (R+2) in contrast with its environment and the conservation of original elements — strip, cornice, louvers;
- No. 73: construction from 1867 whose volume in opposition to the neighboring buildings of this sequence contributes to the varied landscape of the street;
- No. 71: first large building constructed (in 1864) just after the annexation to Paris, with the aesthetic standards of the capital;
- No. 74: building from 1867 whose molding and guard rail are preserved in good condition;
- No. 70: classic and well-preserved composition of the first levels, construction of 1872;
- No. 66: suburban building of good standing integrated into a sequence of varied heights;
- No. 65: characteristic volumetry of the specifications of 1824, three square floors under the attic with preserved shutters;
- No. 64: suburban building in good condition integrated into a sequence of varying heights;
- No. 63: the volume is characteristic of the specifications of 1824, three square storeys under the attic;
- No. 62: suburban building of good standing integrated into a sequence of varied heights;
- No. 61: the volume is characteristic of the specifications of 1824, three square storeys under the attic;
- No. 60: suburban building in good condition integrated into a sequence of varying heights;
- No. 58: the volumetry of this small building is characteristic of the specifications of 1824. Three square storeys under the attic; some louver and articulation preserved;
- Nos. 56 and 116, rue du Théâtre: building that has retained its original volumetry and simplicity, contrasts and marks a landmark on the street;
- Nos. 57 and 120, rue du Théâtre: original low building (1830 period), contrast and landmark on the street.

== See also ==
- 15th arrondissement of Paris
- Arrondissements of Paris
- Grenelle
- Léonard Violet
