= Place du Commerce (disambiguation) =

Place du Commerce may refer to

- Place du Commerce in Paris
- Place du Commerce in Nantes
- Place du Commerce shopping centre on Nuns' Island

== See also ==
- Rue du Commerce
