= Ségur station =

Metro station in Paris, France

Ségur UNESCO
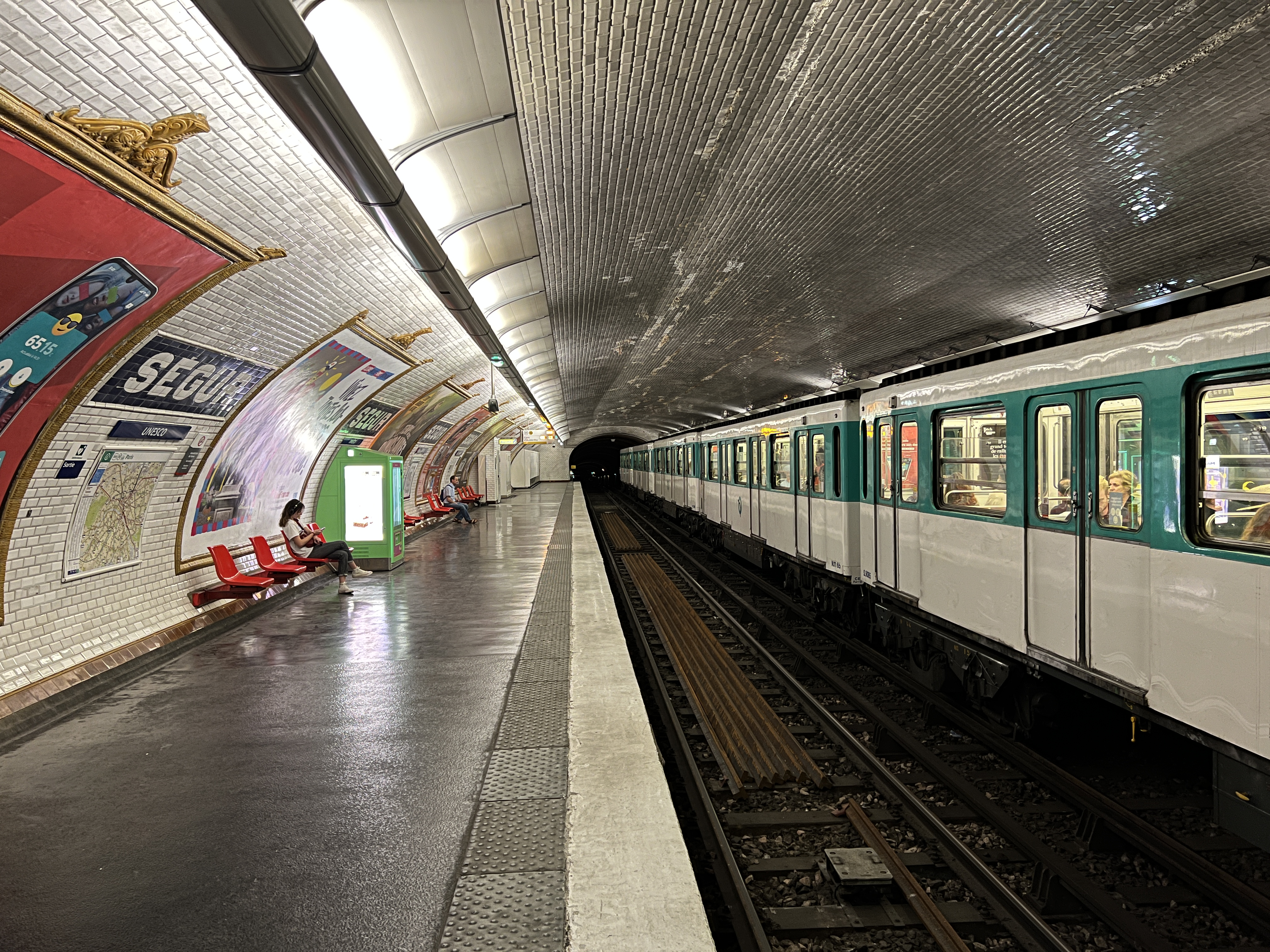
- MF 67 at Ségur

General information
- Location: 7th and 15th arrondissements of Paris; Île-de-France; France
- Coordinates: 48°50′51″N 2°18′25″E
- System: Paris Métro station
- Owner: RATP
- Operator: RATP
- Line: Paris Metro Paris Metro Line 10
- Platforms: 2 (2 side platforms)
- Tracks: 2

Construction
- Accessible: no

Other information
- Fare zone: 1

History
- Opened: 29 July 1937

Passengers
- 1,100,151 (2021)

Services
Preceding station	Paris Metro	Following station
La Motte-Picquet–Grenelle towards Boulogne–Pont de Saint-Cloud	Line 10	Duroc towards Gare d'Austerlitz
Location
- Location within Paris

Ségur (French pronunciation: [seɡyʁ]) is a station on Line 10 of the Paris Métro. It is located on the border of the 7th arrondissement and 15th arrondissement. It is named after avenue de Ségur located 100 m northeast of the station. It was in turn named after Marquis Philippe Henri de Ségur, a Marshall of France and Secretary of State for War from 1780 to 1787. The name Ségur is better known by the novels of his granddaughter by marriage, the Countess of Ségur (1799-1874), best known for her novel, Les Malheurs de Sophie.

== History ==
The station opened on 29 September 1937 when line 10 was extended from Duroc to La Motte-Picquet (now known as La Motte-Picquet–Grenelle), two months after the opening of the section between La Motte-Picquet and Duroc and trains skipped the station. The nameplates on the platforms are subtitiled UNESCO, due to the location of the station near its headquarters. It, however, does not appear on maps published by the RATP.

As part of the "Renouveau du métro" programme by the RATP, the station's platforms and lights were renovated and modernised on 4 January 2006.

In 2019, the station was used by 1,662,452 passengers, making it the 269th busiest of the Métro network out of 302 stations.

In 2020, the station was used by 804,110 passengers amidst the COVID-19 pandemic, making it the 267th busiest of the Métro network out of 108 stations.

In 2021, the station was used by 1,100,151 passengers, making it the 277th busiest of the Métro network out of 305 stations.

== Passenger services ==
=== Access ===
The station has 2 accesses:

- Access 1: avenue de Suffren UNESCO - Fontenoy
- Access 2: boulevard Garibaldi UNESCO - Miollis

=== Station layout ===
Street Level
B1	Mezzanine
Platform level	Side platform, doors will open on the right
Platform level	Westbound	← toward Boulogne – Pont de Saint-Cloud (La Motte-Picquet – Grenelle)
Platform level	Eastbound	toward Gare d'Austerlitz (Duroc) →
Platform level	Side platform, doors will open on the right

=== Platforms ===
The station has a standard configuration with 2 tracks surrounded by 2 side platforms.

=== Other connections ===
This station is not served by any buses from the RATP bus network.

== Nearby ==
- avenue de Breteuil, a famous avenue leading to the Invalides.
- École Militaire
- UNESCO Headquarters

== Gallery ==
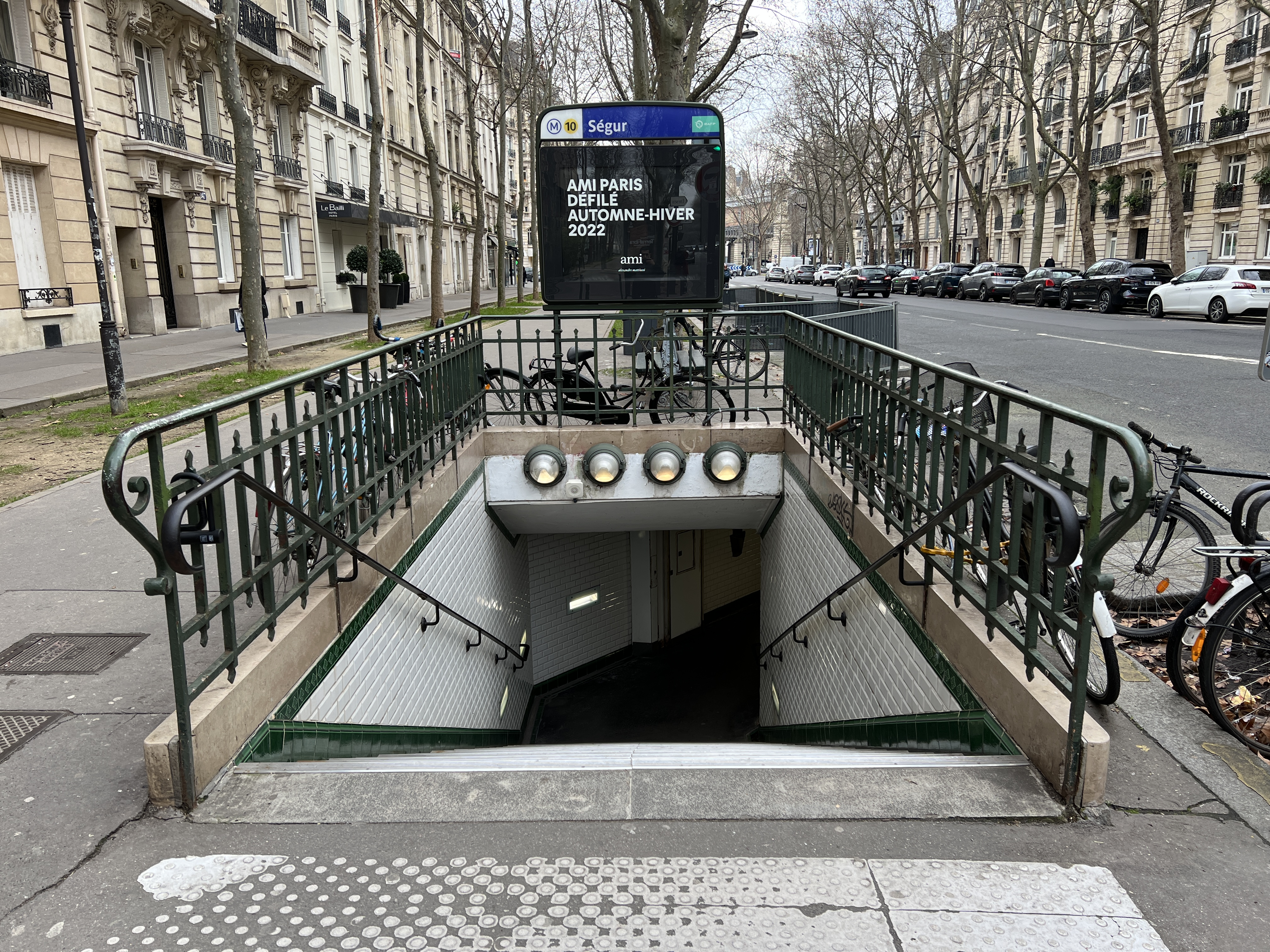
Access 1

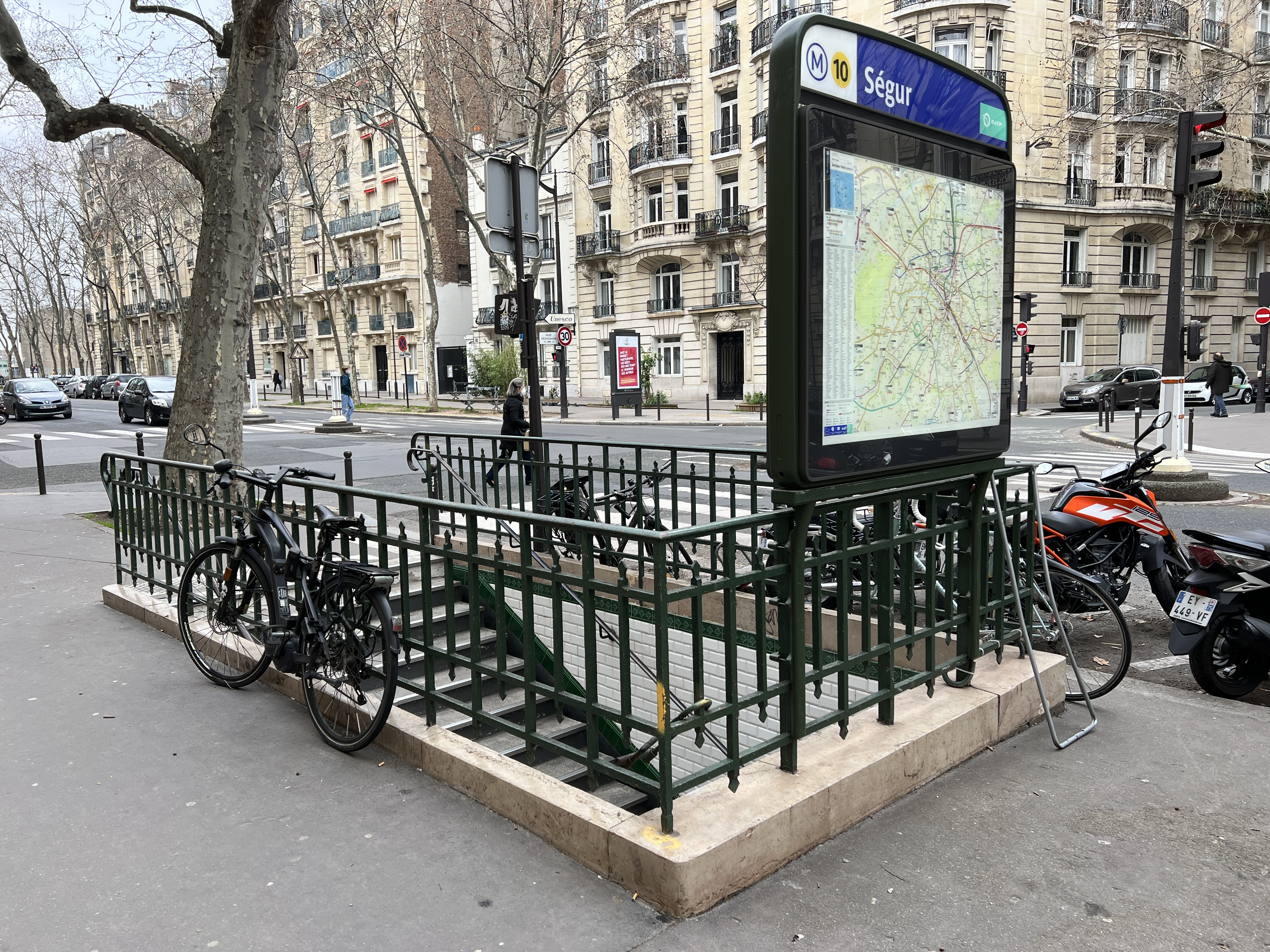
Access 2

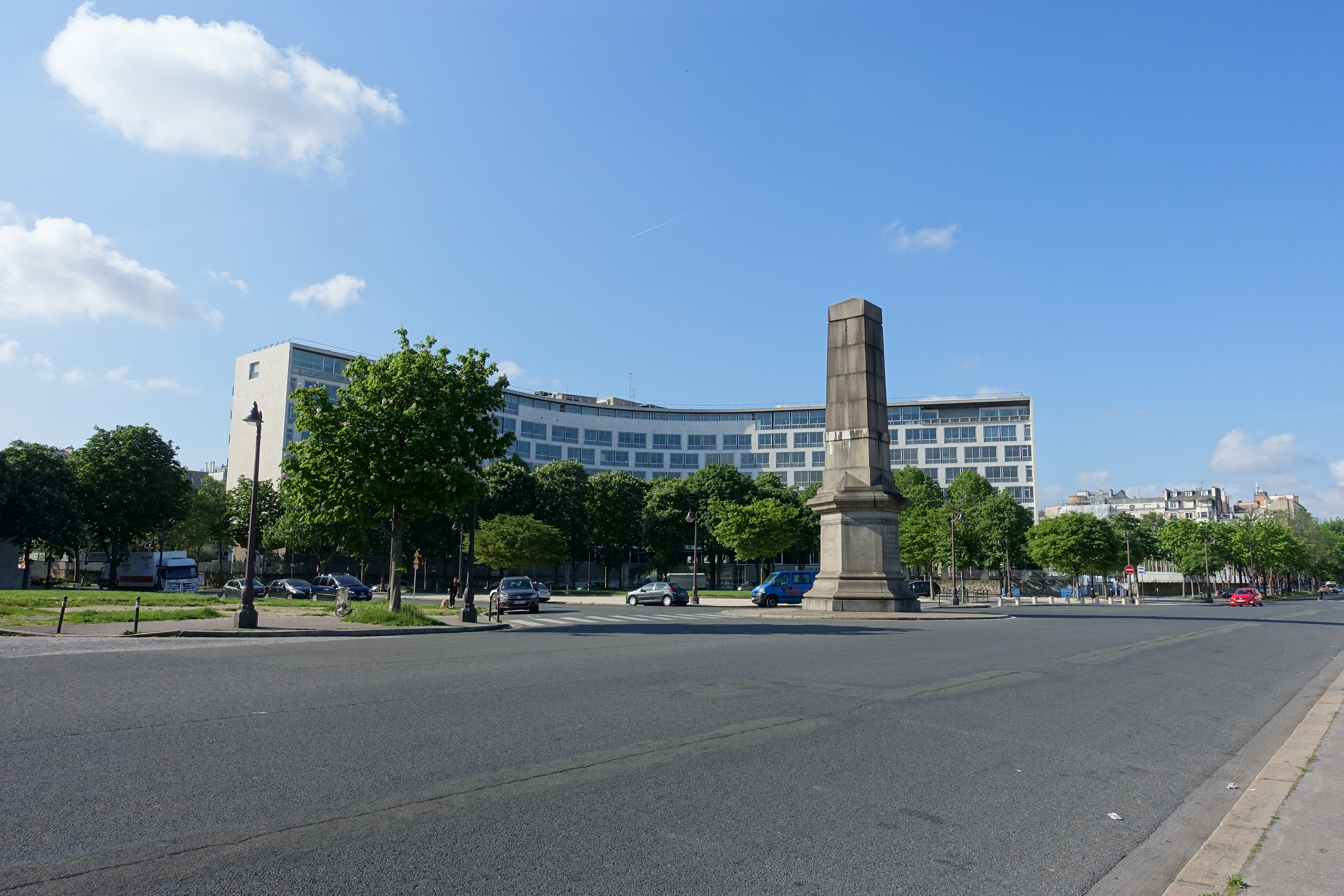
UNESCO Headquarters
