= Commerce station (Paris Metro) =

Paris Métro station

Commerce
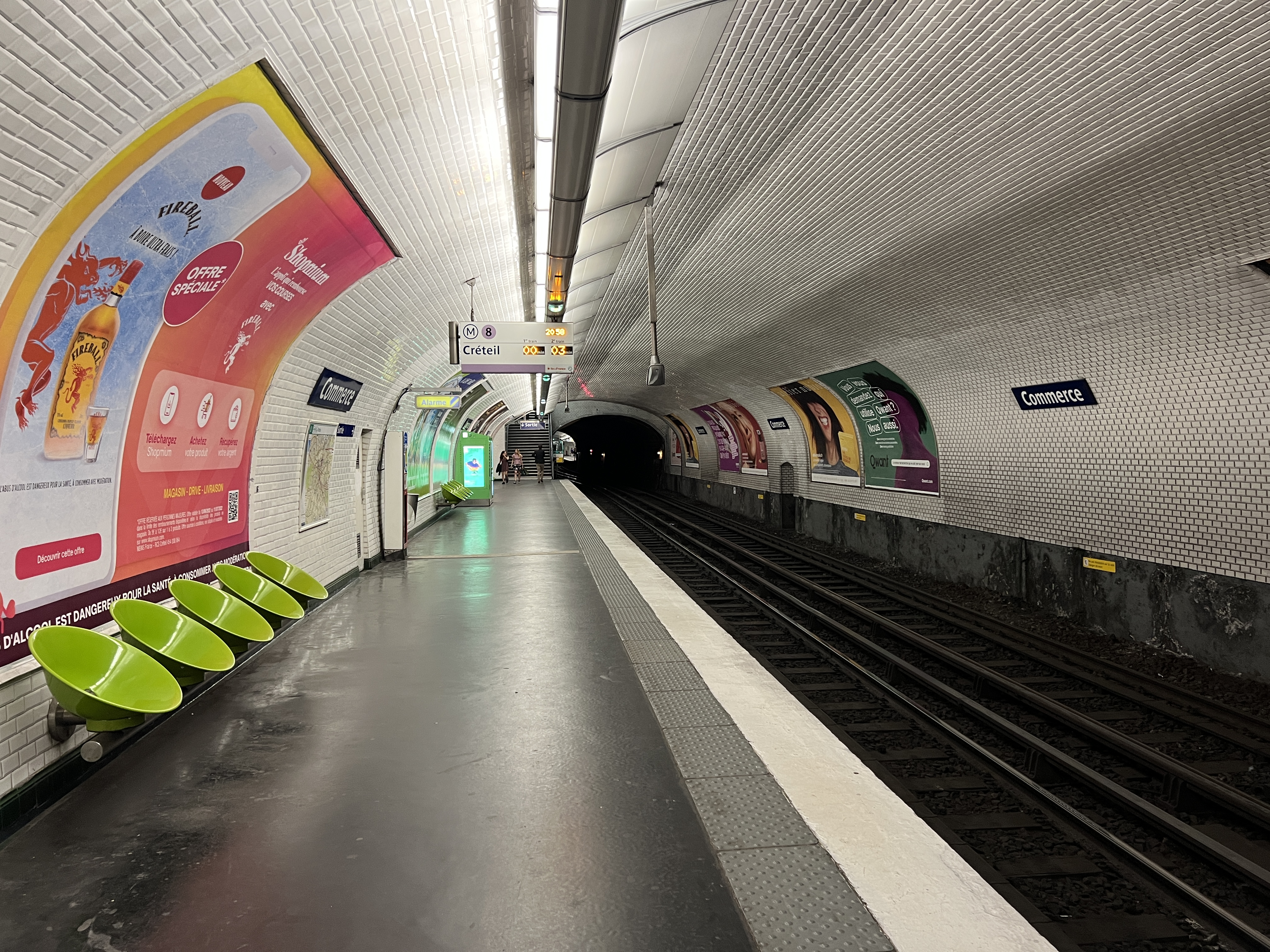
- Platform for services towards Pointe du Lac

General information
- Location: 15th arrondissement of Paris; Île-de-France; France
- Coordinates: 48°50′42″N 2°17′39″E
- System: Paris Métro station
- Owner: RATP
- Operator: RATP
- Line: Paris Metro Paris Metro Line 8
- Platforms: 2 (side platforms)
- Tracks: 2

Other information
- Station code: 17-05
- Fare zone: 1

History
- Opened: 27 July 1937

Passengers
- 2,212,666 (2021)

Services
Preceding station	Paris Metro	Following station
Félix Faure towards Balard	Line 8	La Motte-Picquet–Grenelle towards Pointe du Lac
Location
- Location within Paris

Commerce (French pronunciation: [kɔmɛʁs]) is a station on Line 8 of the Paris Métro under the Rue du Commerce, at the intersection with the Place du Commerce in the 15th arrondissement.

== History ==
The station was opened on 27 July 1937 as part of the extension of line 8 from La Motte-Picquet - Grenelle to Balard. Avenue Émile Zola on line 10 was also previously called Commerce until it was changed to its present name on 1 March 1937. Hence, it is the last station to inherit the name of an older station on the network, after Vaugirard on line 12 and Saint-Mandé on line 1.

The rue du Commerce, as its name suggests, is a shopping street in the district of Grenelle. The whole span of the street, from Motte-Picquet to the Eglise Saint-Jean-Baptiste, is occupied by a mix of high-street shopping, amongst which are about 20 national and international brands, and small, typically Parisian food stores and cafés. After major real estate development in the 1990s and early 2000s, the street and surrounding neighborhood have managed to maintain much of their peripheral faubourg or small-town feel while prospering as one of the major centers for population attraction in the 15th arrondissement.

The station was renovated as part of the "Renouveau du métro" programme by the RATP on 7 April 2008, removing the previously installed orange tiling when it was first renovated in 1969 in the Mouton-Duvernet style, restoring the traditional bevelled white tiling.

There are two Vélib' bicycle stations within the vicinity, one on rue Lakanal opposite the station, and one on rue Violet on the far side of Place du Commerce.

In 2019, the station was used by 2,864,592 passengers, making it the 184th busiest of the Métro network out of 302 stations.

In 2020, the station was used by 1,616,379 passengers amidst the COVID-19 pandemic, making it the 159th busiest of the Métro network out of 305 stations.

In 2021, the station was used by 2,212,666 passengers, making it the 157th busiest of the Métro network out of 305 stations.

== Passenger services ==
=== Access ===
The station has two accesses:

- Access 1: rue du Commerce
- Access 2: rue des Entrepreneurs (with an ascending escalator)

=== Station layout ===
Street Level
B1	Mezzanine
Platform level	Side platform, doors will open on the right
Platform level	Westbound	← toward Balard (Félix Faure)
Platform level	Eastbound	toward Pointe du Lac (La Motte-Picquet – Grenelle) →
Platform level	Side platform, doors will open on the right

- Note: The side platforms are offset.

==== Platforms ====
Due the station being built under rue d'Amsterdam, it is too narrow to accommodate the usual layout of the platforms, where the two side platforms are directly opposite each other. As such, its two side platforms are completely offset from each other, the northern platform for services towards Pointe du Lac and the southern platform for services towards Balard. Due to similar reasons, Liège on line 13 also have completely offset platforms whereas the ones at Anatole France on line 3 are only partially offset.

== Nearby ==
- Eglise Saint-Jean-Baptiste (at the southern extremity of the rue du Commerce; it was built in 1825 and was extensively renovated between 1924 and 1926)
- Lycée Camille Sée
- Square Saint-Lambert
- Square Yvette-Chauvé (formerly Square de la Place-du-Commerce)

== Gallery ==
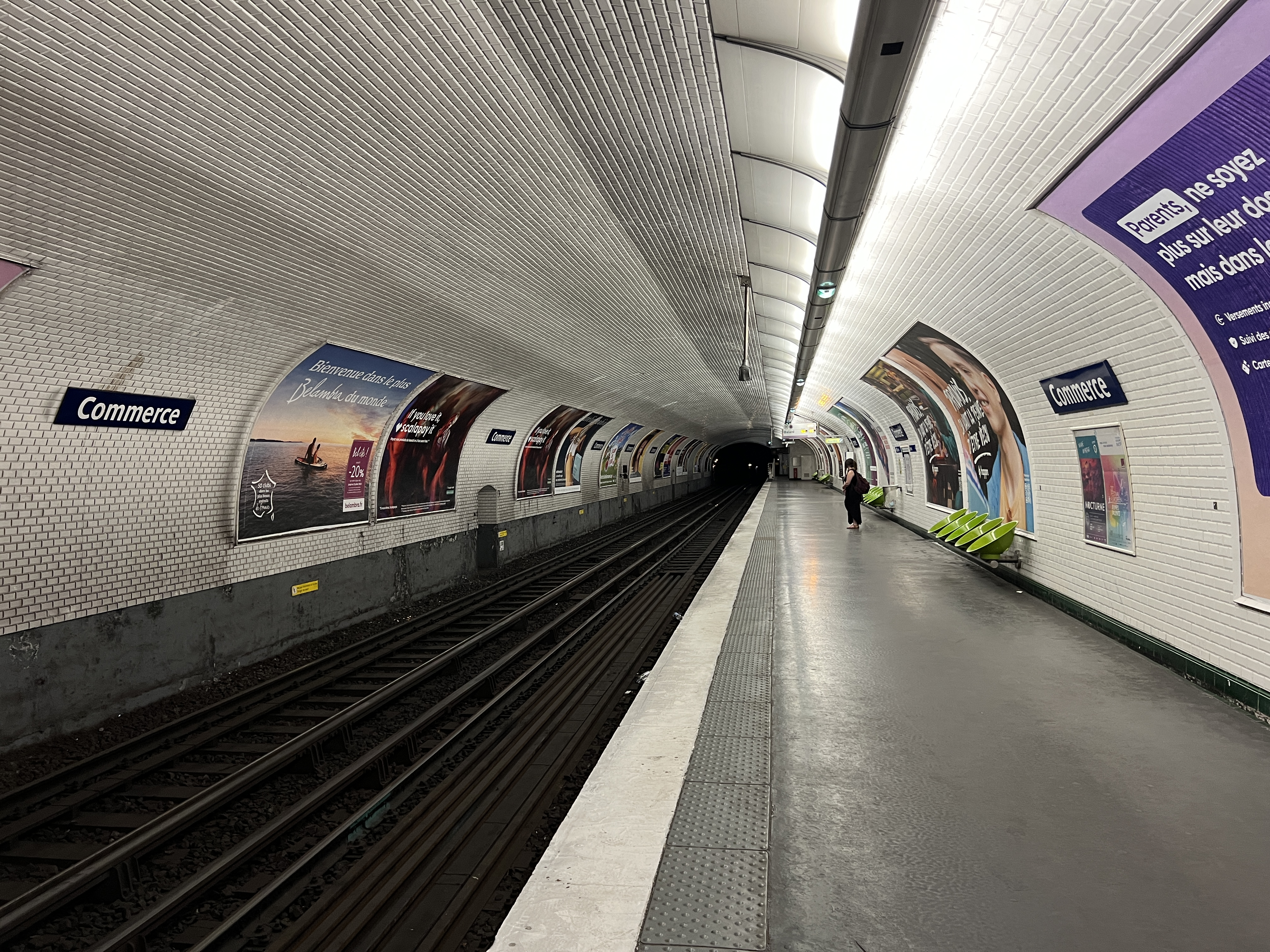
Platform for services towards Balard

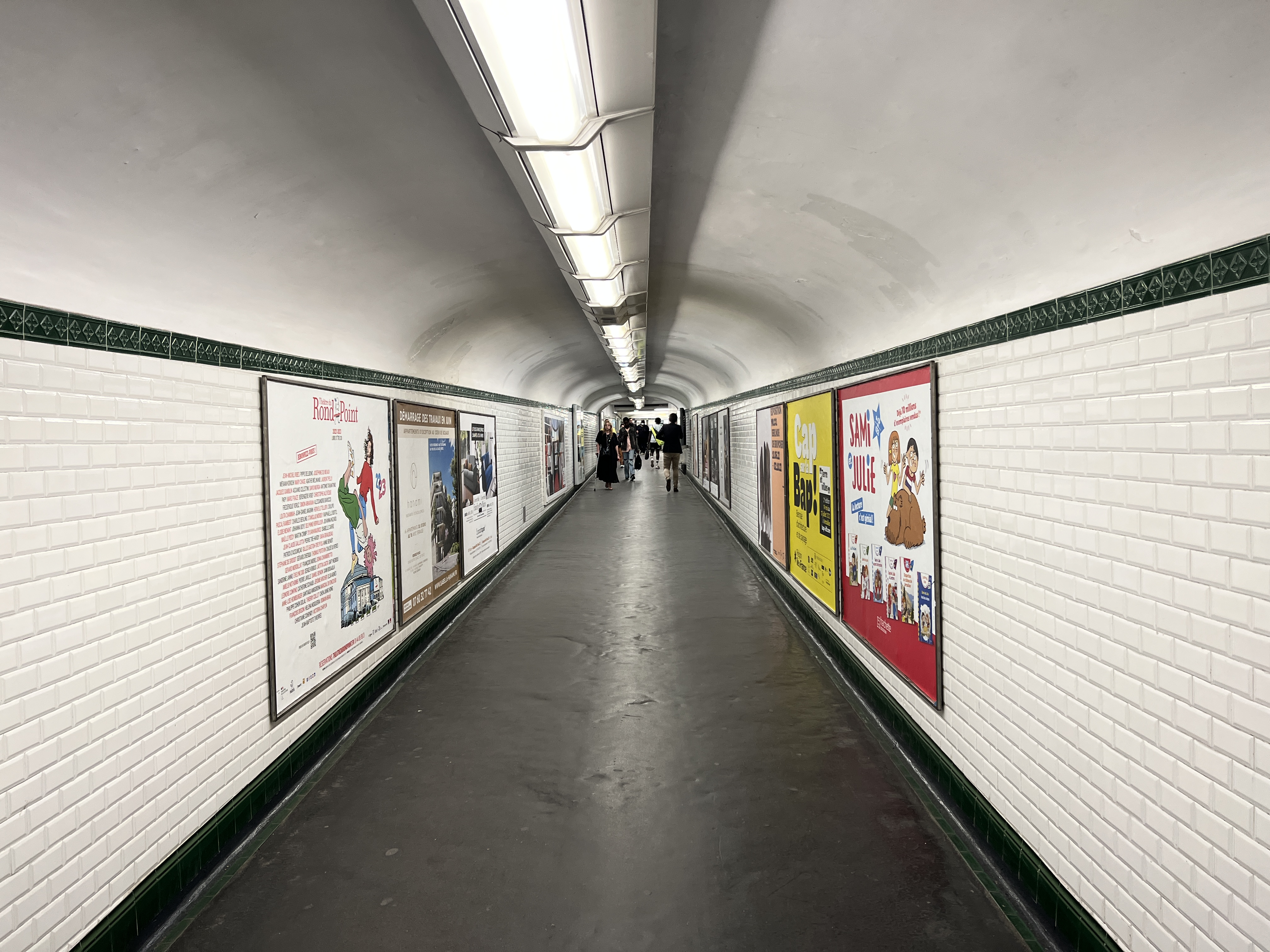
One of the corridors within the station

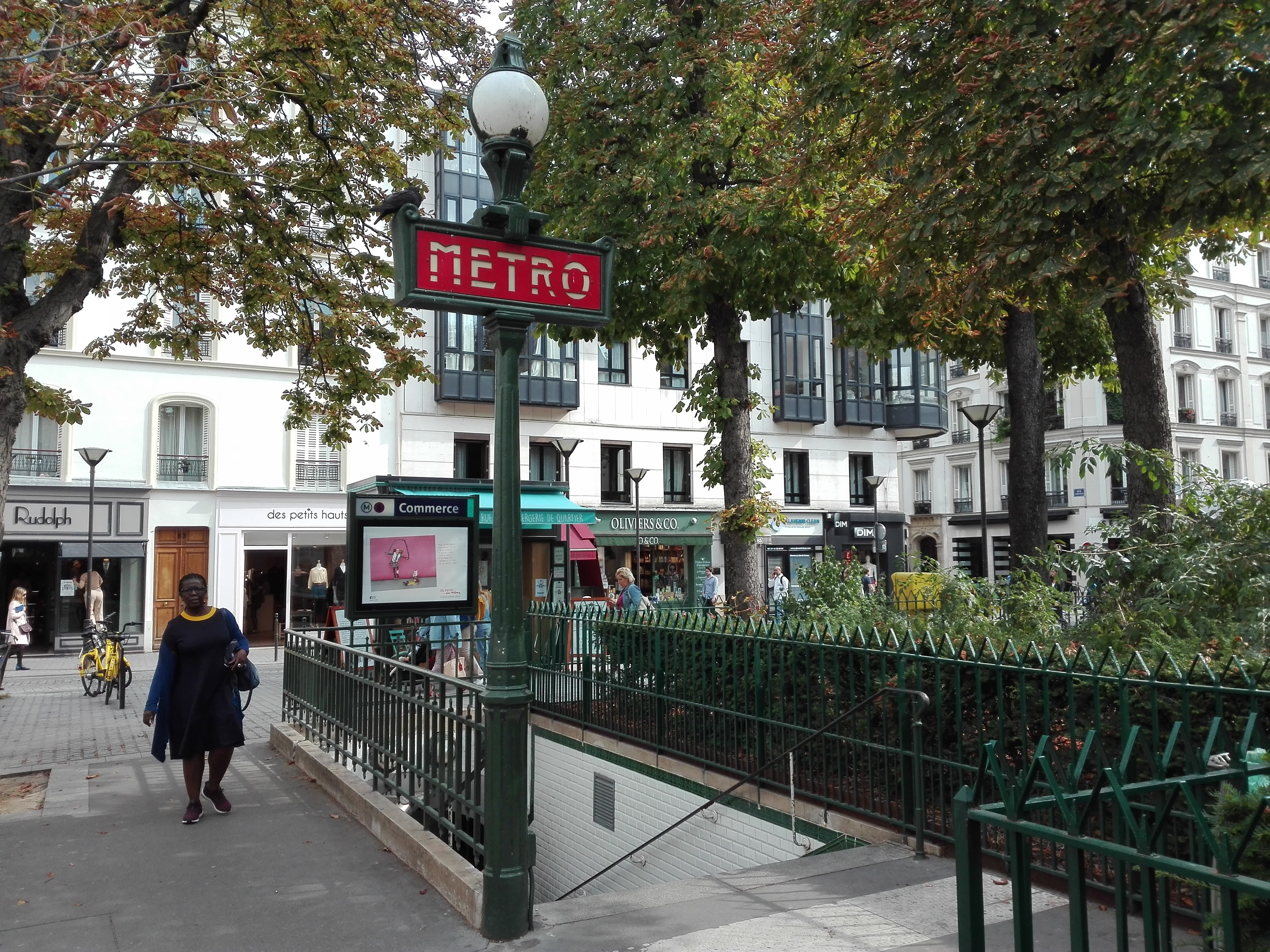
Access 1

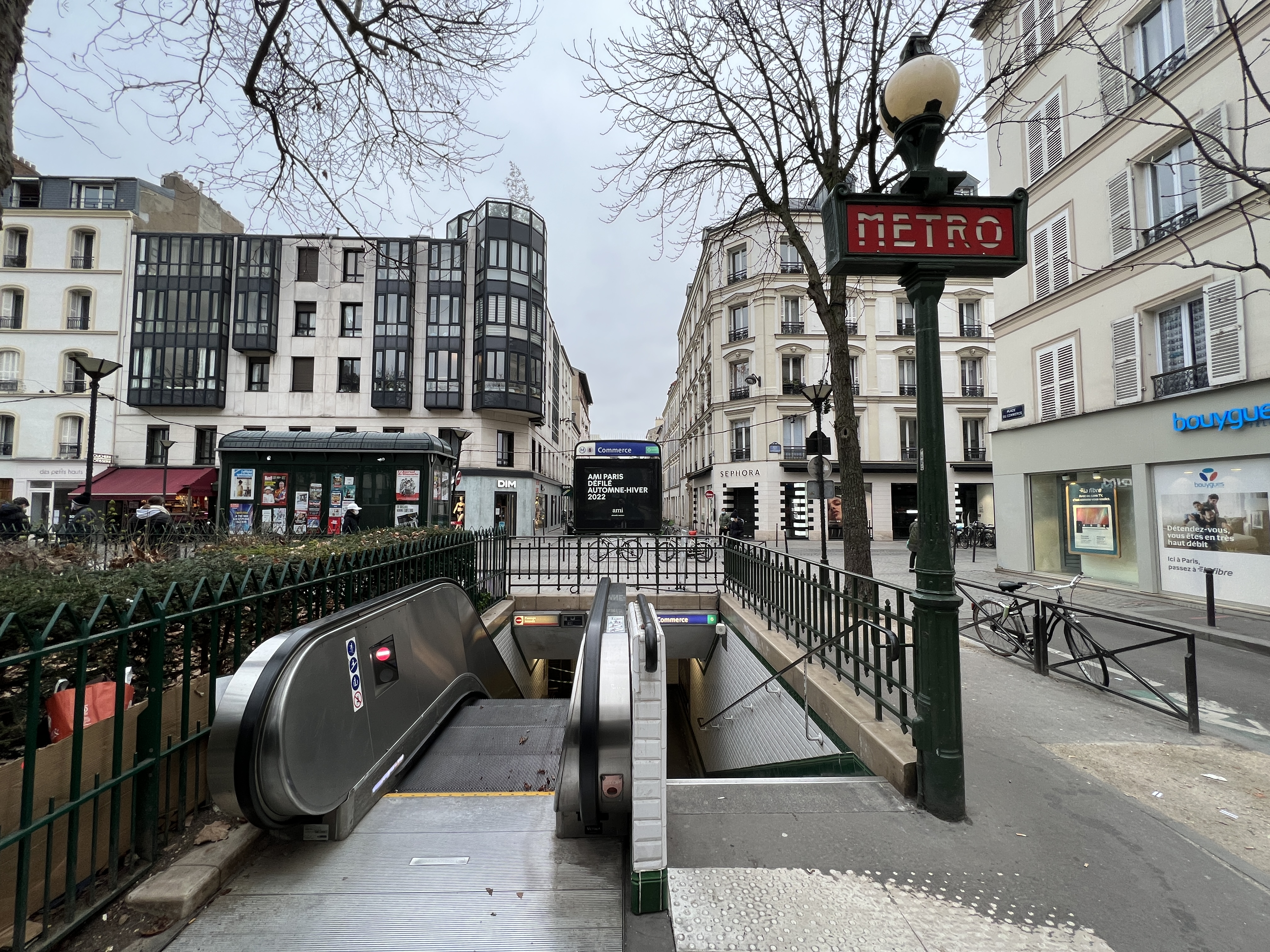
Access 2

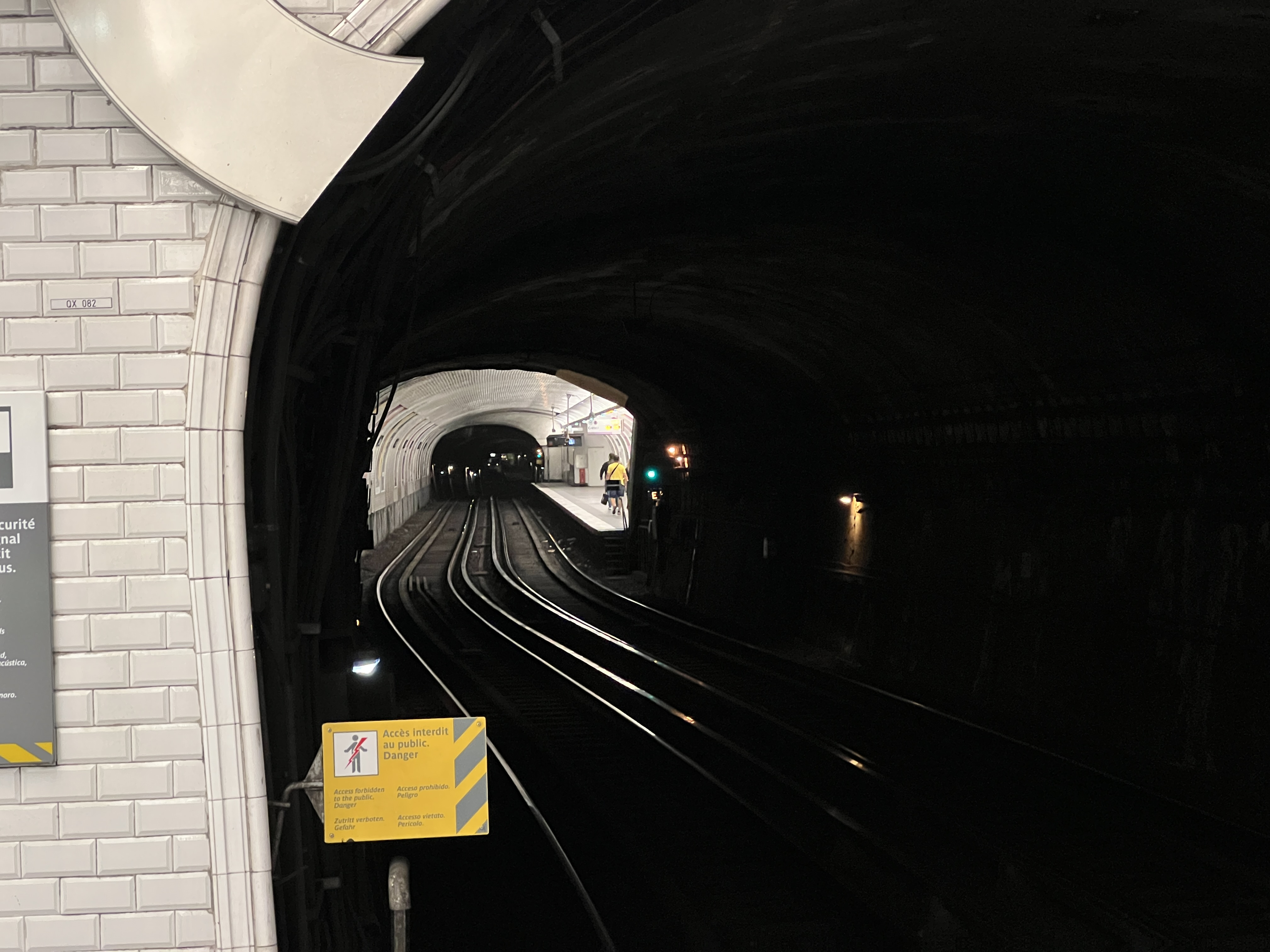
View of the platform for services towards Pointe du Lac
