= Lycée Camille Sée (Paris) =

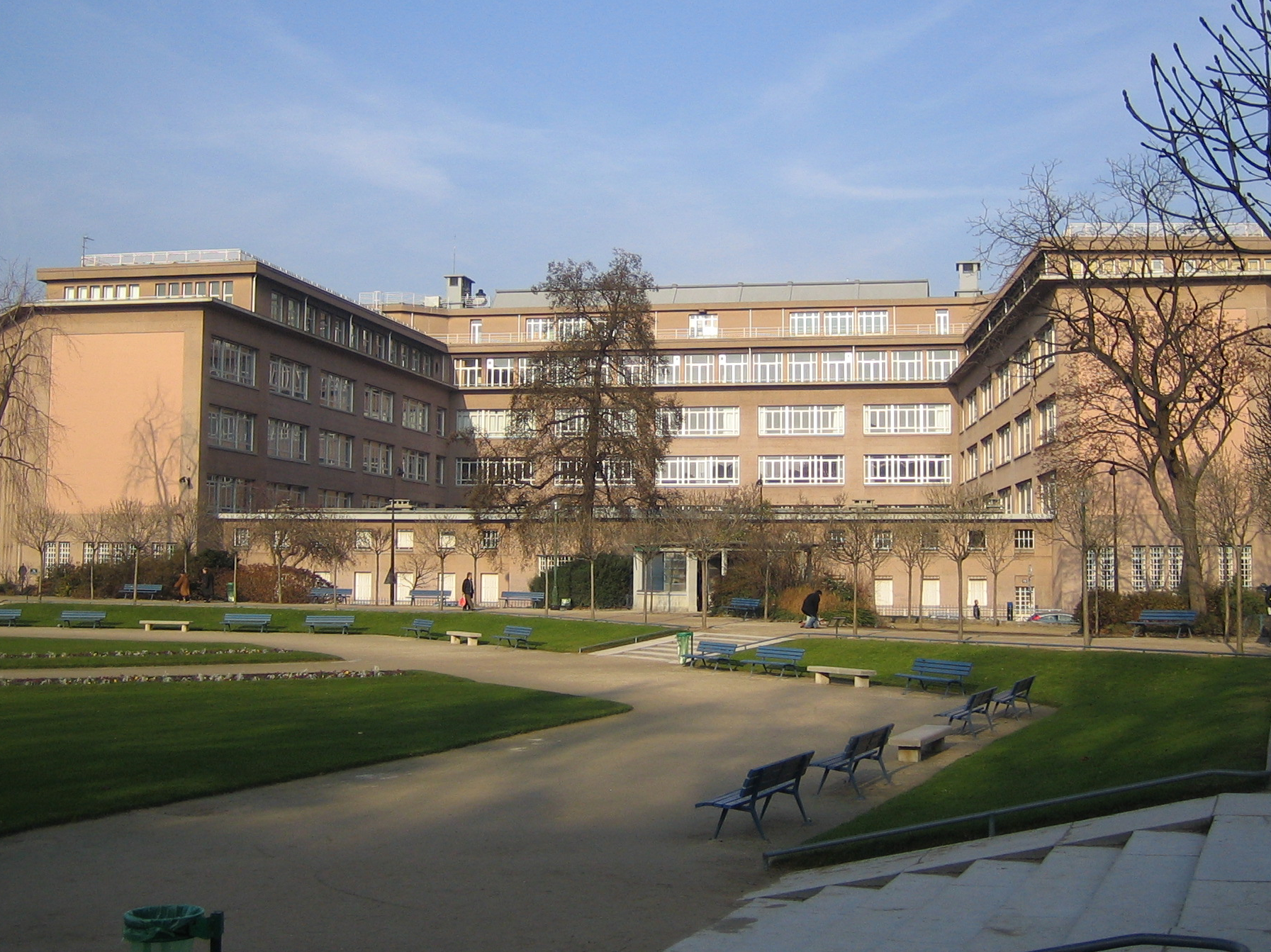
- View of the lycée Camille-Sée from square Saint-Lambert

Location
- 11, rue Léon-Lhermitte, Paris; France
- Coordinates: 48.8432295°N 2.29719534°E

Information
- Type: Établissement public local d'enseignement (EPLE)
- Enrollment: Around 600 lycée pupils
- Website: http://www.ac-paris.fr/serail/lyc-camille-see/

The lycée Camille-Sée is a public secondary school located in the 15th arrondissement of Paris. Created in the 1930s, it takes most of its students from the West of Paris (7th, 15th, and 16th arrondissements of Paris). The building is a Monument historique and a French heritage site. It is named in honour of the politician Camille Sée who introduced reforms to aid girls' education during the French Third Republic.

== Location ==
The college and lycée Camille-Sée are located at 11, rue Léon-Lhermitte in the 15th arrondissement of Paris opposite square Saint-Lambert, not far from the arrondissement town hall. It is served by the Métro stations Commerce and Vaugirard as well as the 39 . The college annex is located on rue Mademoiselle to the north of the main building.

== History ==
The construction of the lycée Camille-Sée was decided upon 50 years after that of the lycée Buffon. It was given the name of the Deputy who introduced a project for girls' education into law on 29 October 1878, a law which was hotly disputed before being introduced in 1880. The inauguration took place on 1 June 1935. The first headteacher was Marie-Thérèse Évrard.

The building was constructed on the site of a former gasworks, by the architect François Le Cœur, whose son took over after his death. The allocated area was small. In addition, important foundations had to be laid, as the soil was sandy, on a bed of clay. There are three levels below the road.

Built in concrete, with pink granite and crushed marble, the external walls are austere, but the interior contains mosaics in the design of a labyrinth and a courtyard and halls in a typical 1930s design.

There is a pavilion, currently closed, located in square Saint-Lambert opposite, and a subway allowing students to enter and leave the establishment. The main entrance through the rotunda was then exclusively for administrative and teaching staff.

Movement between the first, second, and third floors took place by use of escalators, now removed for security reasons.

The establishment offers literary classe préparatoire aux grandes écoles.

A commemorative plaque commémorative in honour of the architect François Le Coeur was unveiled in 1994 by Prime Minister Édouard Balladur.

== Lycée ranking ==
In 2016, the lycée ranked 93rd out of 110 at départemental level in terms of teaching quality and 1681st at the national level. The ranking is based on three criteria: the bac results, the proportion of students who obtain their French baccalaureate having spent their last two years at the establishment, and added value (calculated based on the social origin of students, their age, and their national diploma results).

== Description ==
=== The main building ===
The establishment is mostly based in a building facing square Saint-Lambert. It is very representative of the 1930s Art déco style due to its wide galleries, its paved courtyard, and its rotunda. It consists of six levels served by four staircases.

- At -1 there are college rooms overlooking the courtyard.
- On the ground floor is the main entrance, the office of the headmaster and deputy head, the secretaries of the middle and high school, the music room, and the refectory.
- On the first floor, there are classrooms for middle and high school classes, IT rooms, the library, and the infirmary.
- The second floor is mainly for middle school classes rooms but also has some for the lycée.
- The third floor is exclusively for high school classes and students, with the offices of the senior education consultant.
- On the fourth floor are labs for life and Earth sciences, physics-chemistry and science options.
- On the fifth floor are art rooms and life and Earth sciences.

=== Annex ===
Camille-Sée also has a more recent annex, which contains the gymnasium for the middle and high school. It includes areas for many sports, such as: badminton, gymnastics, and bodybuilding (with weight training machines).

== Alumni ==
Simone de Beauvoir taught in 1939, as did Maurice Clavel, in the 1960s and Janine Méary. The politician Marie-Caroline Le Pen was also a student.

== British international section ==
Since 2010, the school has offered a program to prepare students for the bac option internationale (BFI) in the British section. This program is offered for all classes, going from 6th to terminale classes.

== Culture ==
The lycée is at the centre of a scene in the film L.627.

The last episode of the series Bref on Canal+, which takes place in square Saint-Lambert, ends with a shot of the school.

The walls of the school also featured in the film 120 battements par minute (2017) by Robin Campillo, a film tracing the battle of Act Up-Paris in the 1990s against AIDS, in the face of public indifference.

== Sources ==
- C'était hier... le XV^{e} arrondissement Bernard Ucla-Michel Willard - Éditions LM-Le Point - 1997 - ISBN 2-904463-11-9

== See also ==
- Girls' schools
