= La Motte-Picquet–Grenelle station =

Metro station in Paris, France

La Motte-Picquet–Grenelle
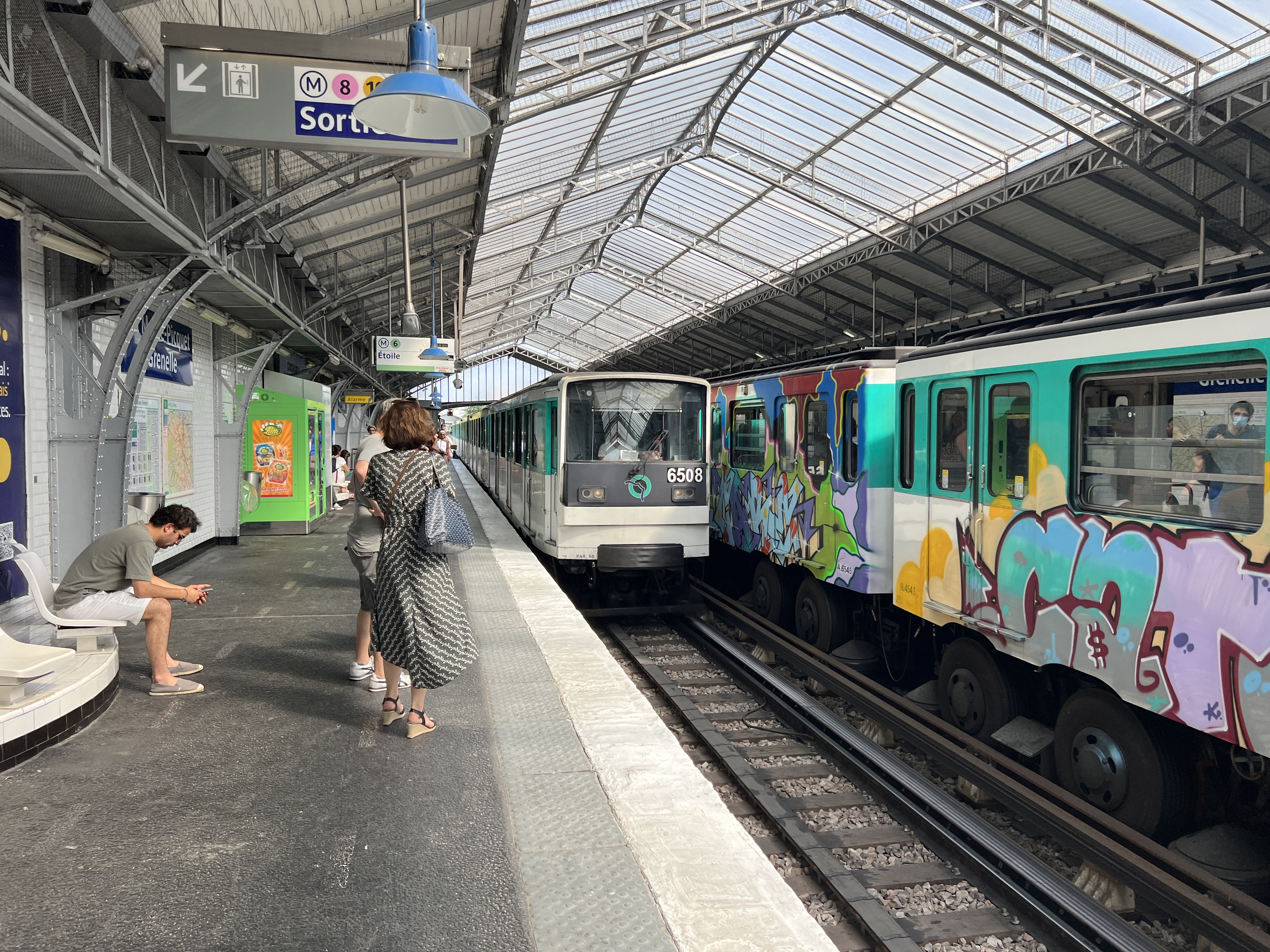
- MP 73s on Line 6 platforms

General information
- Location: 15th arrondissement of Paris; Île-de-France; France
- Coordinates: 48°50′57″N 2°17′53″E
- System: Paris Metro station
- Owner: RATP
- Operator: RATP
- Line: Paris Metro Paris Metro Line 6 Paris Metro Line 8 Paris Metro Line 10
- Platforms: 4 (2 island platforms, 2 side platforms)
- Tracks: 6

Construction
- Accessible: no

Other information
- Station code: 17-04
- Fare zone: 1

History
- Opened: 24 April 1906 (Line 6); 13 July 1913 (Line 10); 27 July 1937 (Line 8)
- Former names: La Motte-Piquet (1906-1913)

Passengers
- 5,117,708 (2021)

Services
Preceding station	Paris Metro	Following station
Dupleix towards Charles de Gaulle–Étoile	Line 6	Cambronne towards Nation
Commerce towards Balard	Line 8	École Militaire towards Pointe du Lac
Avenue Émile Zola towards Boulogne–Pont de Saint-Cloud	Line 10	Ségur towards Gare d'Austerlitz
Location
- Location within Paris

La Motte-Picquet–Grenelle (French pronunciation: [la mɔt pikɛ ɡʁənɛl]) is a station of the Paris Metro, at the interconnection of lines 6, 8, and 10 in the 15th arrondissement. The station combines underground and elevated platforms. It is a major metro interchange on the Rive Gauche, and the largest west of Montparnasse.

== History ==
Diagram showing the rerouting of lines in 1937

The elevated station first opened on 24 April 1906 under the name La Motte-Piquet, as part of the extension of Line 2 South from Passy to Place d'Italie. It was named after the nearby avenue de La Motte-Picquet, after Admiral Toussaint-Guillaume Picquet de La Motte (1720–1791), and boulevard de Grenelle, a former commune until it was annexed by Paris in 1860.

On 14 October 1907, Line 2 South was incorporated into Line 5, which now plied between Étoile (now Charles de Gaulle–Étoile) and Lancry (now Jacques Bonsergent).

On 13 July 1913, Line 8's platforms opened as part of the initial section of the line from Beaugrenelle (now Charles Michels) and Opéra. On the same day, the station was renamed La Motte-Picquet–Grenelle, which it still remains today. These are the current platforms served by lines 8 towards Créteil and 10 towards Gare d'Austerlitz. It was originally intended for Line 8 to run from Opéra with two branches, one to Porte d'Auteuil and the other to Balard, with the line branching from La Motte-Picquet–Grenelle. Hence, the island platform was designed to accommodate trains coming from both branches then onwards to Opéra. The platform used today for Line 10 towards Boulogne would have been the southbound platform for service to the two branches, although this had not been built yet.

From 17 May to 6 December 1931, the section between Place d'Italie and Étoile of Line 5 was temporarily transferred to Line 6 to provide service to the colonial exhibition held at Bois de Vincennes that year. It was eventually returned to Line 5.

The section of Line 8 from La Motte-Picquet–Grenelle to Porte d'Auteuil was transferred to Line 10 on 27 July 1937 when Line 8 was extended south to Balard. However, service between Porte d'Auteuil and Jussieu was not provided with service initially limited to La Motte-Picquet–Grenelle until the underground connection for Line 10 was opened linking La Motte-Picquet–Grenelle and Duroc two days later. This was part of the reconfiguration of lines 8, 10 and the old 14. The platform for Line 8 towards Balard was built beneath the existing platforms due to the narrow confines of the streets above. Line 8's platforms on the island platform were extended to 105 m to cater for seven-car trains in the future, although the plan did not materialise in the end.

On 6 October 1942, the section of Line 5 between Place d'Italie and Étoile, including La Motte-Picquet–Grenelle, was transferred back to Line 6 in anticipation of the opening of the extension of the former to Eglise de Pantin on 12 October that same year. This was to prevent Line 5 from becoming too long.

In 1969, the platform used for Line 8 towards Balard was renovated in the "Mouton-Duvernet" style with its characteristic orange coloured tiles instead of the typical bevelled white tiles used extensively elsewhere in the network.

As part of the Renouveau du métro programme by the RATP, the access corridors to Line 6 were renovated in 2007 along with its platforms in 2008. The platform used for Line 8 services to Balard was also renovated in 2014, removing the "Mouton-Duvernet" style decoration on the side wall of the platform (the side walls of the tracks still retains it), bringing back the use of the white tiles. From 1 July to 31 August 2020, the station was closed to replace their asphalt flooring with anthracite gray tiling along the access corridors to Line 6 as well as the platforms of lines 8 and 10. In 2022, some of the staircases in the station were installed with street art by artist Chris Puddy.

In 2019, the station was used by 7,958,383 passengers, making it the 30th busiest of the Metro network out of 302 stations.

In 2020, the station was used by 3,428,458 passengers amidst the COVID-19 pandemic, making it the 44th busiest of the Metro network out of 305 stations.

In 2021, the station was used by 5,117,708 passengers, making it the 34th busiest of the Metro network out of 305 stations.

== Passenger services ==
=== Access ===
The station has five accesses:

- Access 1: rue de Commerce
- Access 2: avenue de La Motte-Picquet (with an escalator)
- Access 3: boulevard de Grenelle
- Access 4: rue de Pondichéry (access to lines 8 and 10 only)
- Access 5: avenue de Suffren (access to lines 8 and 10 only)

=== Station layout ===
2F	Side platform, doors will open on the right
2F	Westbound	← toward Charles de Gaulle–Étoile (Dupleix)
2F	Eastbound	toward Nation (Cambronne) →
2F	Side platform, doors will open on the right
1F	Mezzanine
Street Level
B1	Mezzanine
B2	Side platform, doors will open on the right
B2	Westbound	← toward Boulogne–Pont de Saint-Cloud (Avenue Émile Zola)
B2	Wall
B2	Eastbound	toward Gare d'Austerlitz (Ségur) →
B2	Island platform, doors will open on the left (Line 8), or right (Line 10)
B2	Eastbound	toward Pointe du Lac (École Militaire) →
B3	Westbound	← toward Balard (Commerce)
B3	Side platform, doors will open on the left

=== Platforms ===
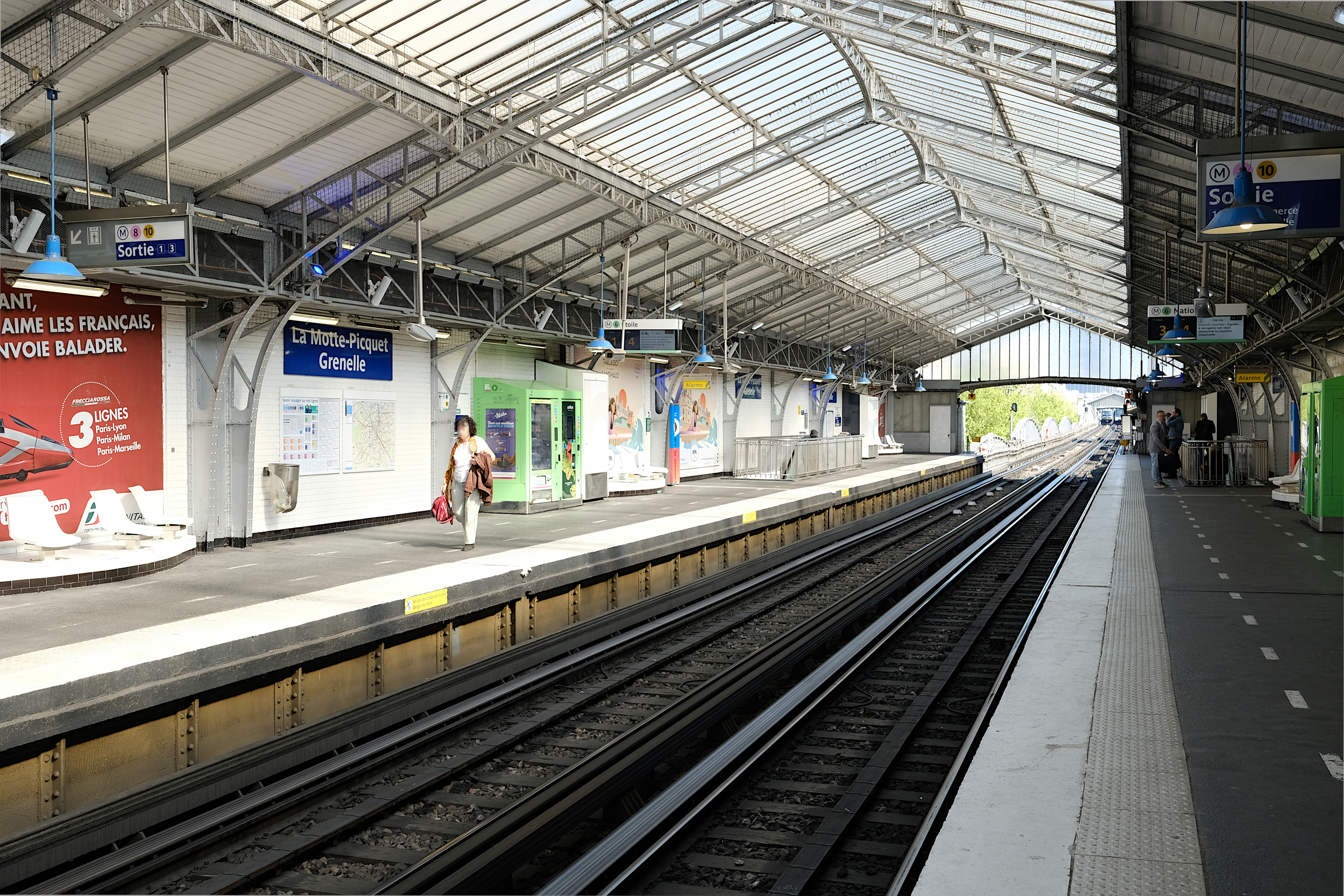
The platform of Line 6.

Line 6's station is elevated and has a standard configuration with 2 tracks surrounded by 2 side platforms. On the other hand, the underground platforms for lines 8 and 10 have a unique configuration.

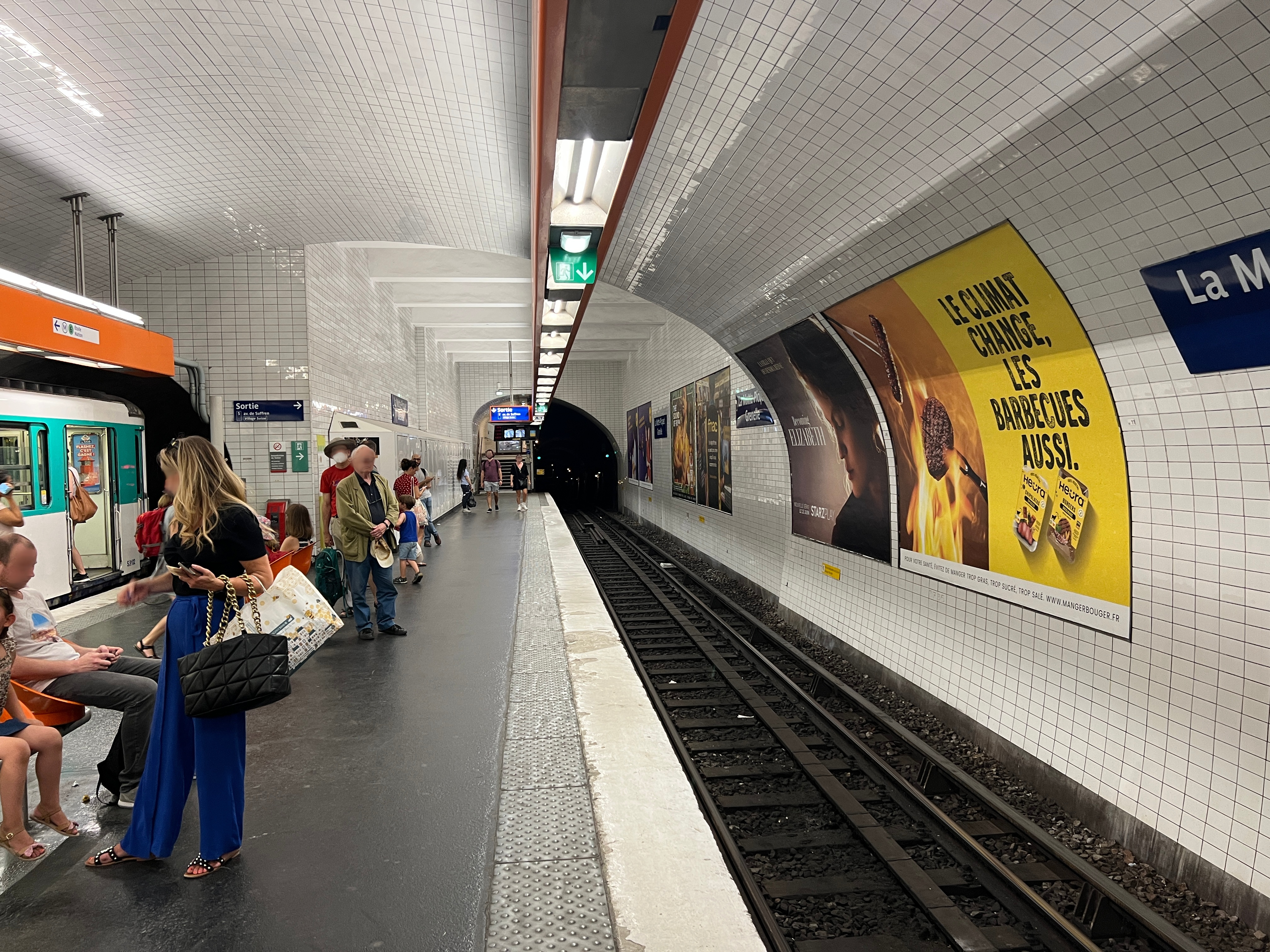
The platform extension of Line 8 (eastbound towards Créteil) with a flat ceiling.

On the upper level are the tracks of lines 8 and 10 both heading east on either side of an island platform, measuring 105 m (Line 8) and 75 m (Line 10) respectively, as well as the track of Line 10 in the direction of Boulogne located in a half-station separated by a wall on the east of the island platform, comprising a single track with a side platform measuring 105 m in length, a feature unique on the line. The island platform is contained in an elliptical vault, except for the northeast end of the platform for Line 8 when it was extended in 1937. It has a horizontal ceiling painted white.

On the lower level is a half station for Line 8 services to Balard, also with a single platform and track and is 105 m long. It has almost entirely vertical side walls and a low, flat ceiling, inclined towards the platform, barring the northeastern end which has a slightly higher elliptical vault. The side walls are also clad with flat white tiles arranged vertically instead of in staggered rows like most other stations on the metro, a feature only found at Père Lachaise on Line 2 and at Gare du Nord on Line 4 (until 2017).

=== Other connections ===
The station is also served by lines 80 and 82 of the RATP bus network.

== Gallery ==
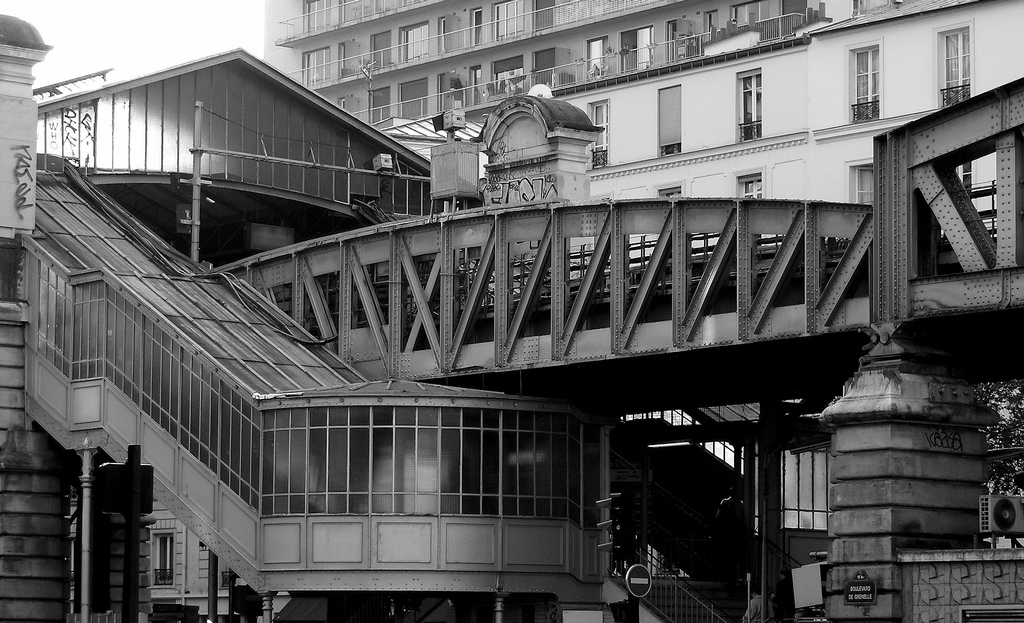
Exterior of Line 6 platforms

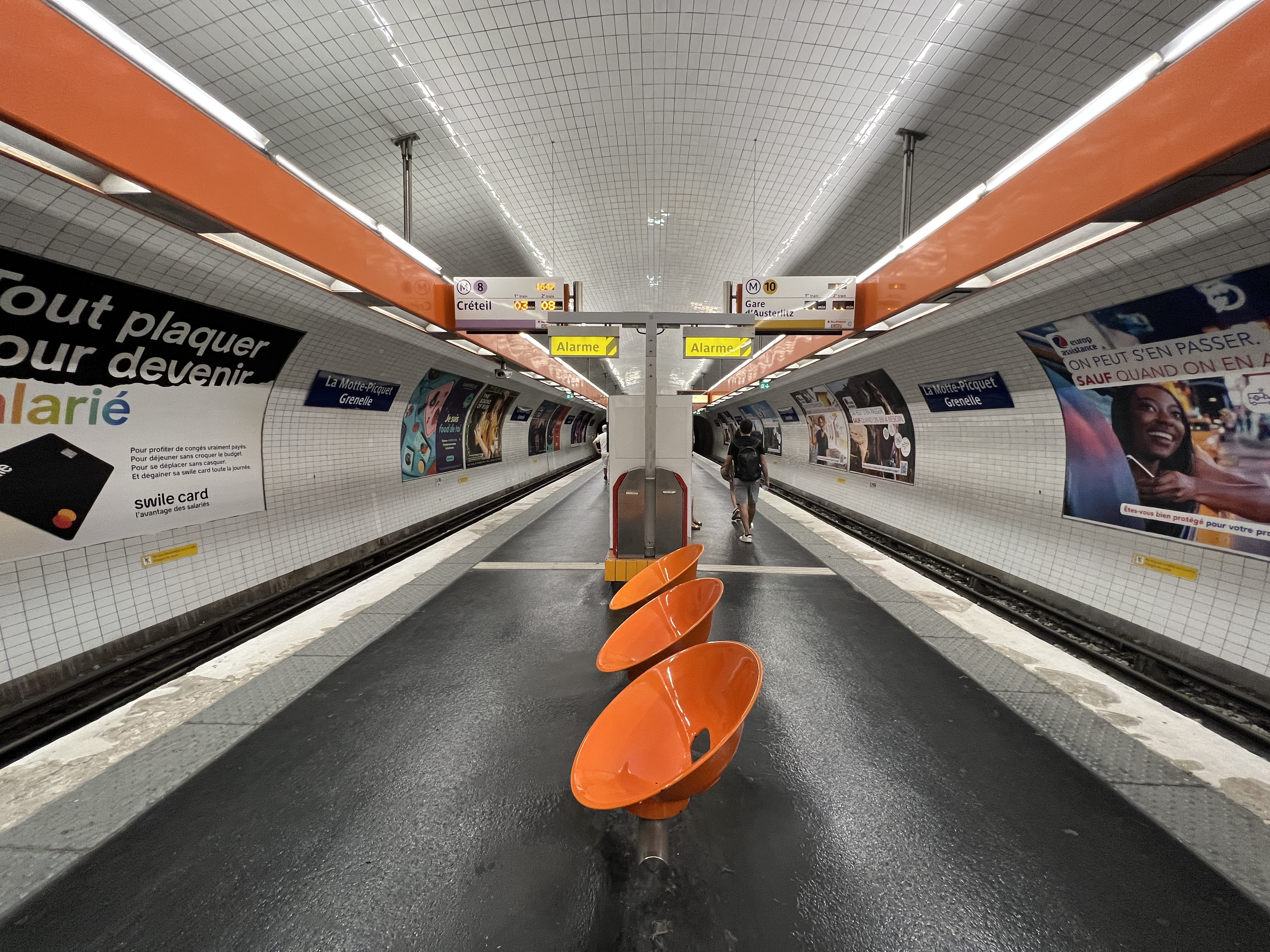
Platform for Line 8 services to Créteil and for Line 10 services to Gare d'Austerlitz

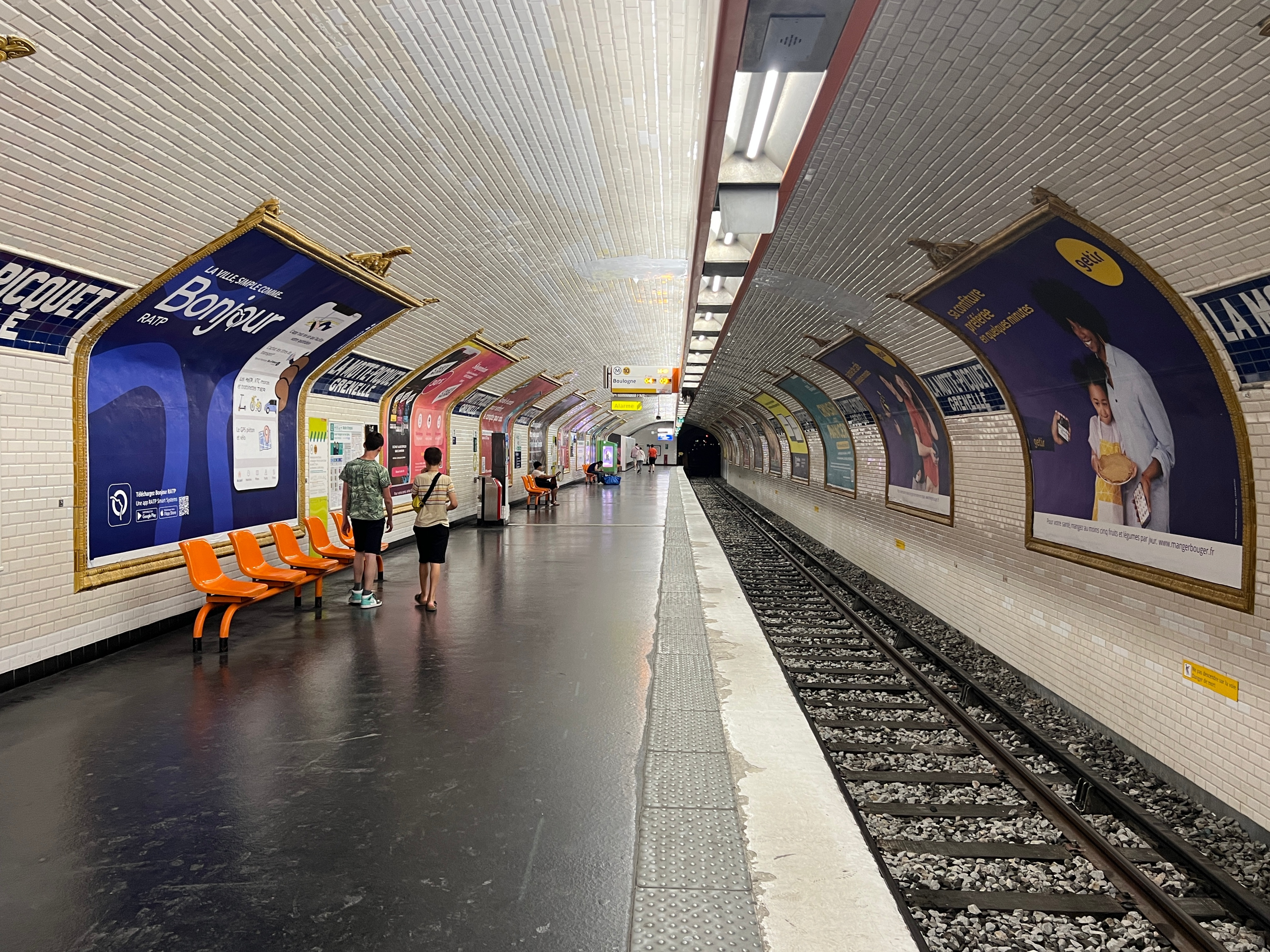
Platform for Line 10 services to Boulogne

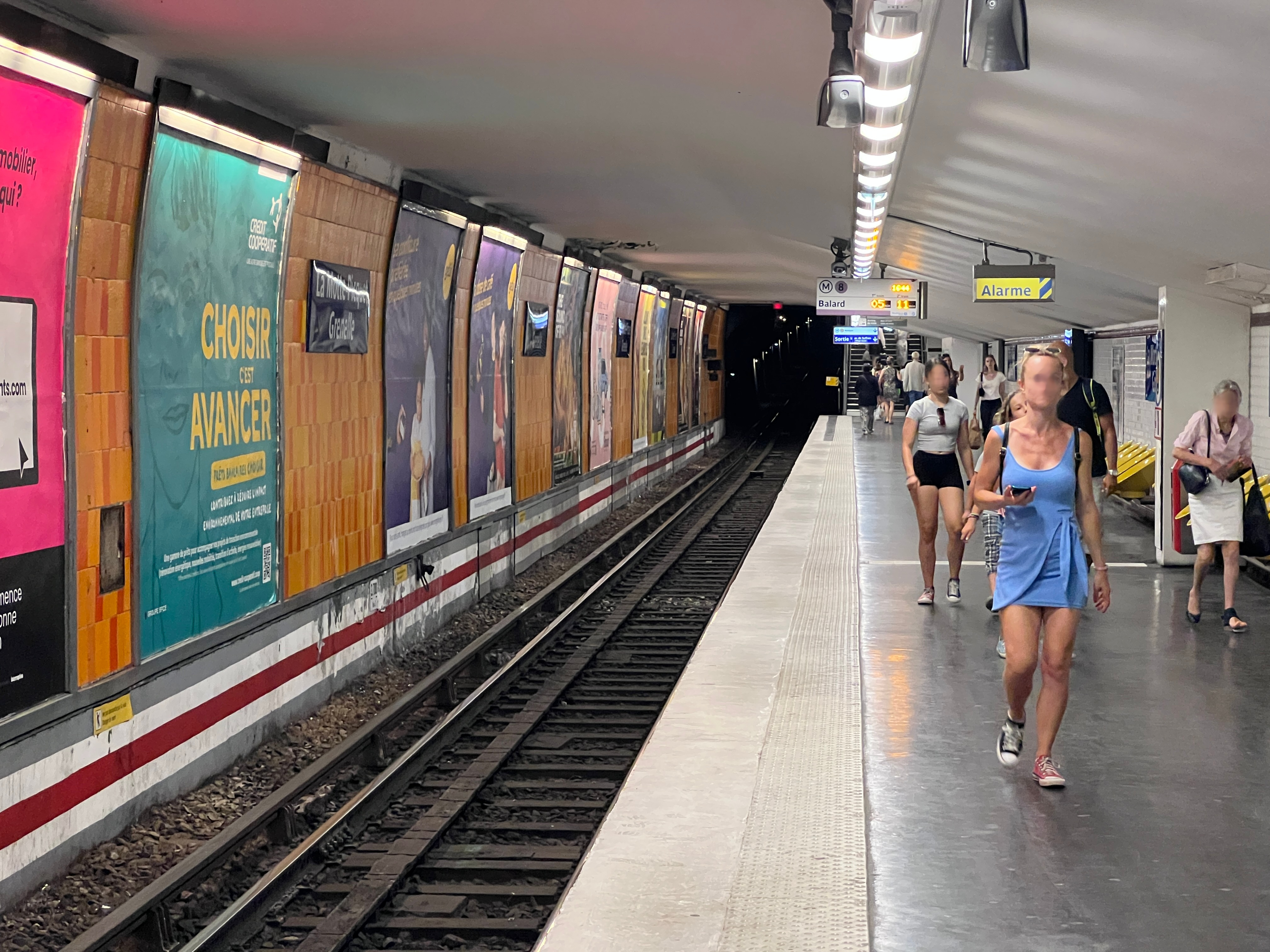
Platform for Line 8 services to Balard

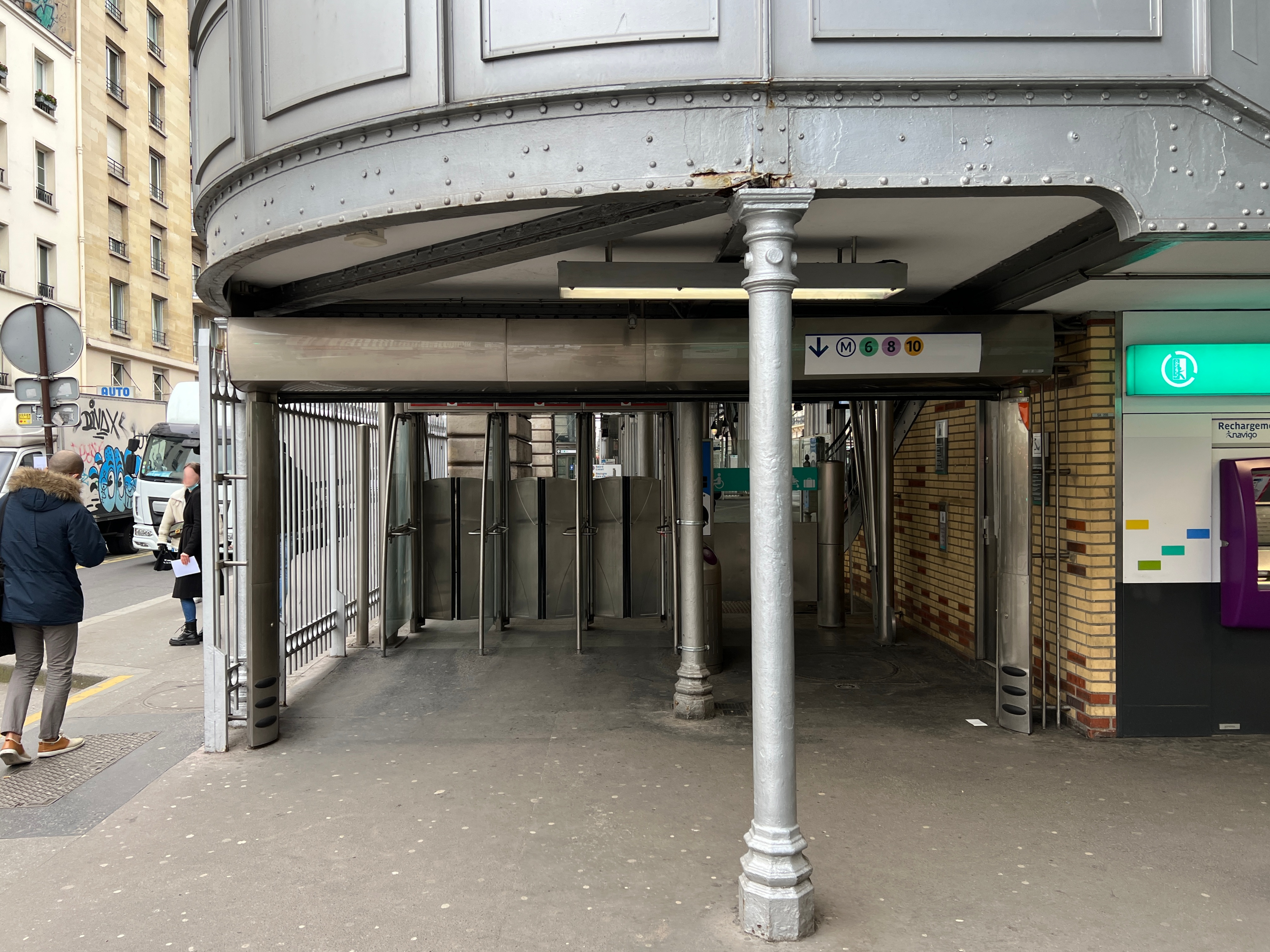
Access 1

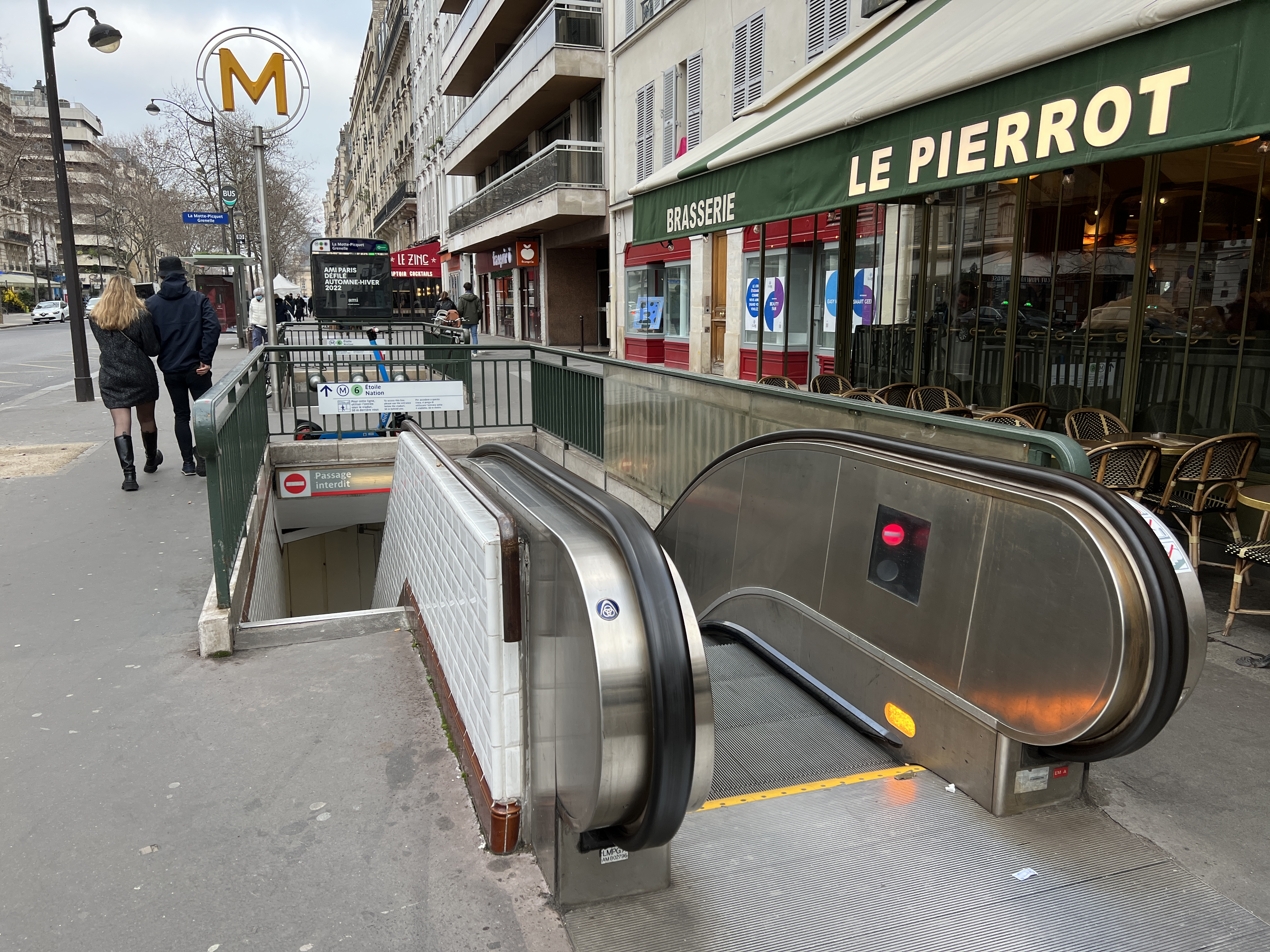
Access 2

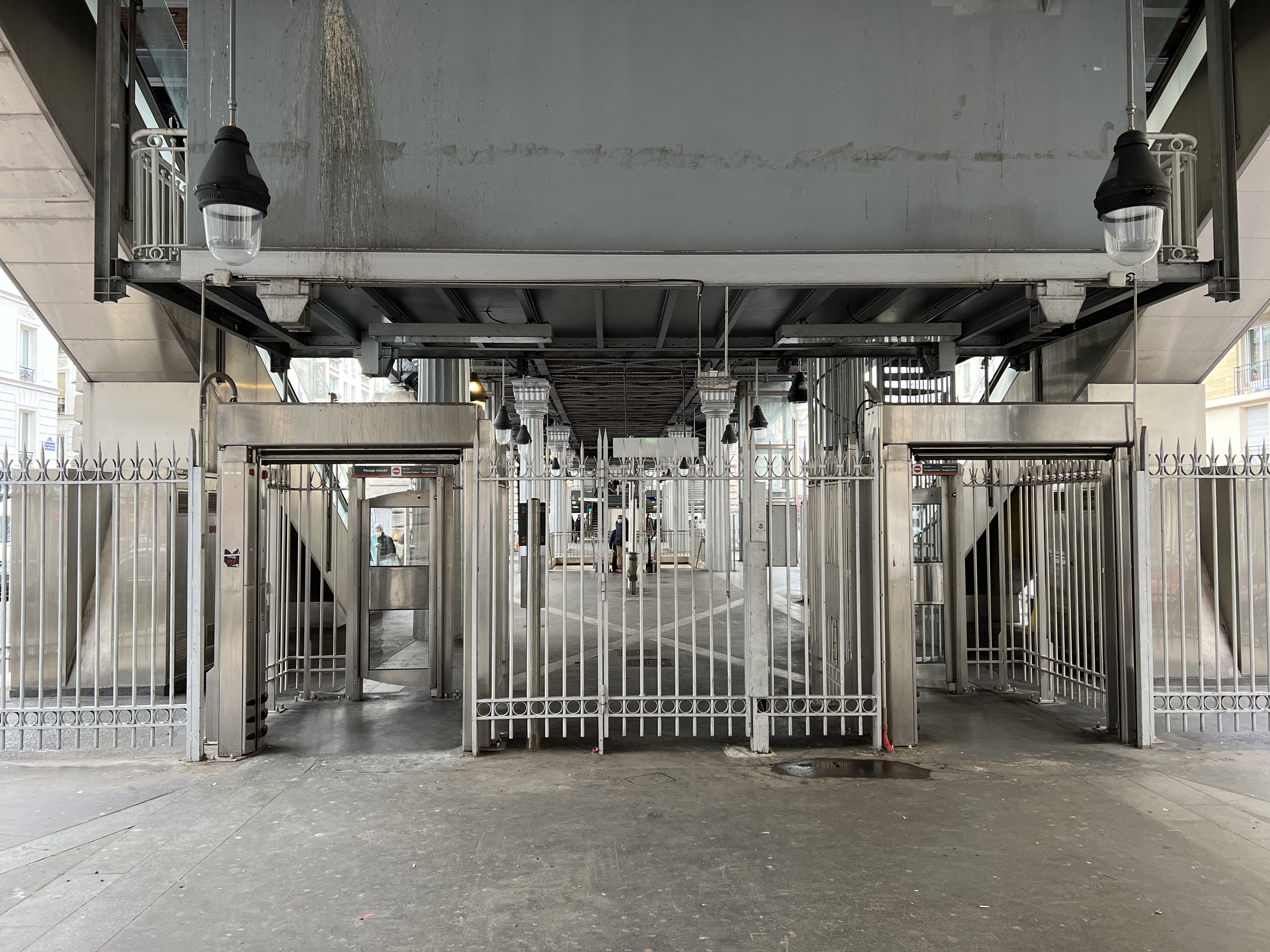
Access 3

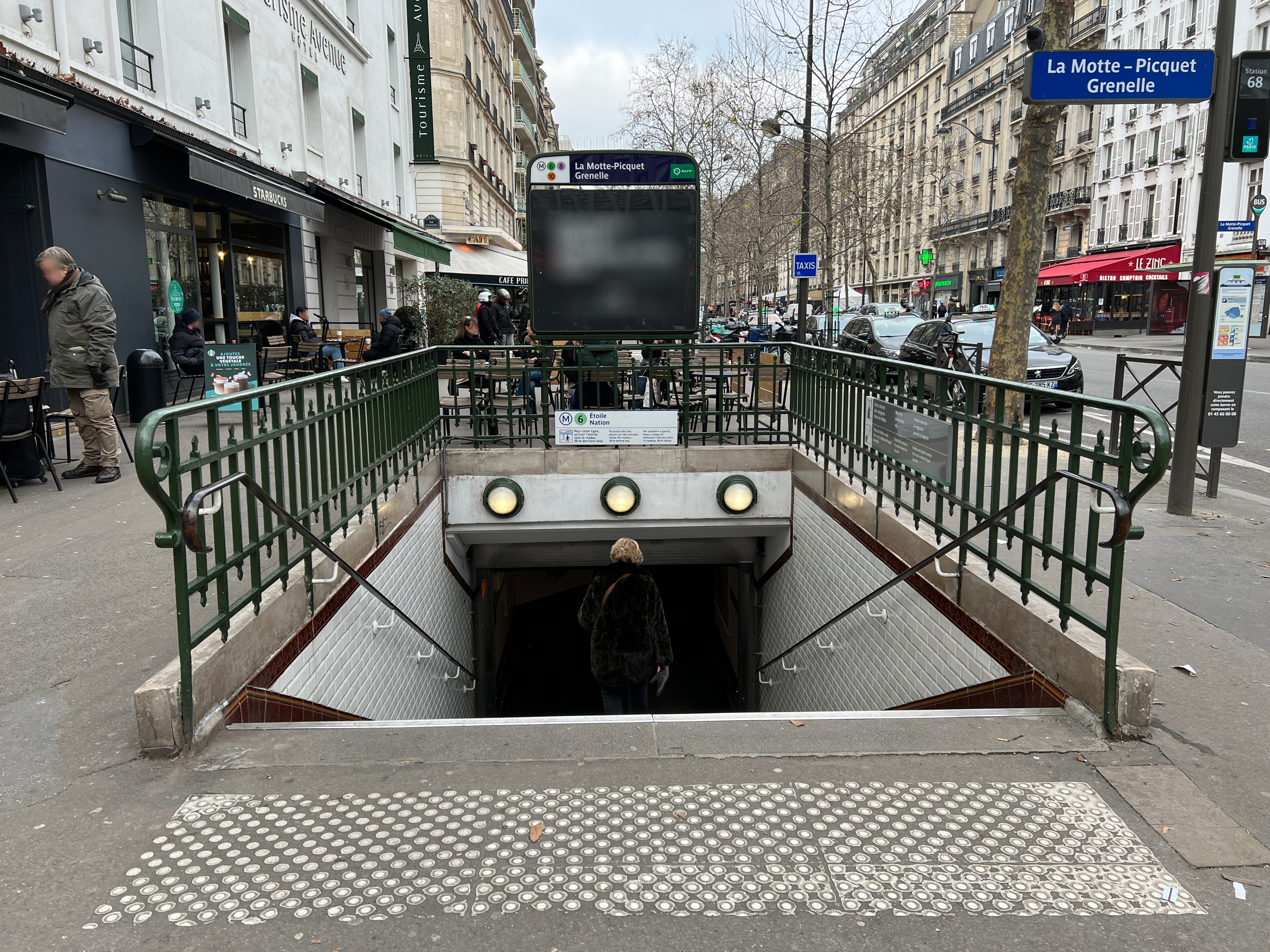
Access 4

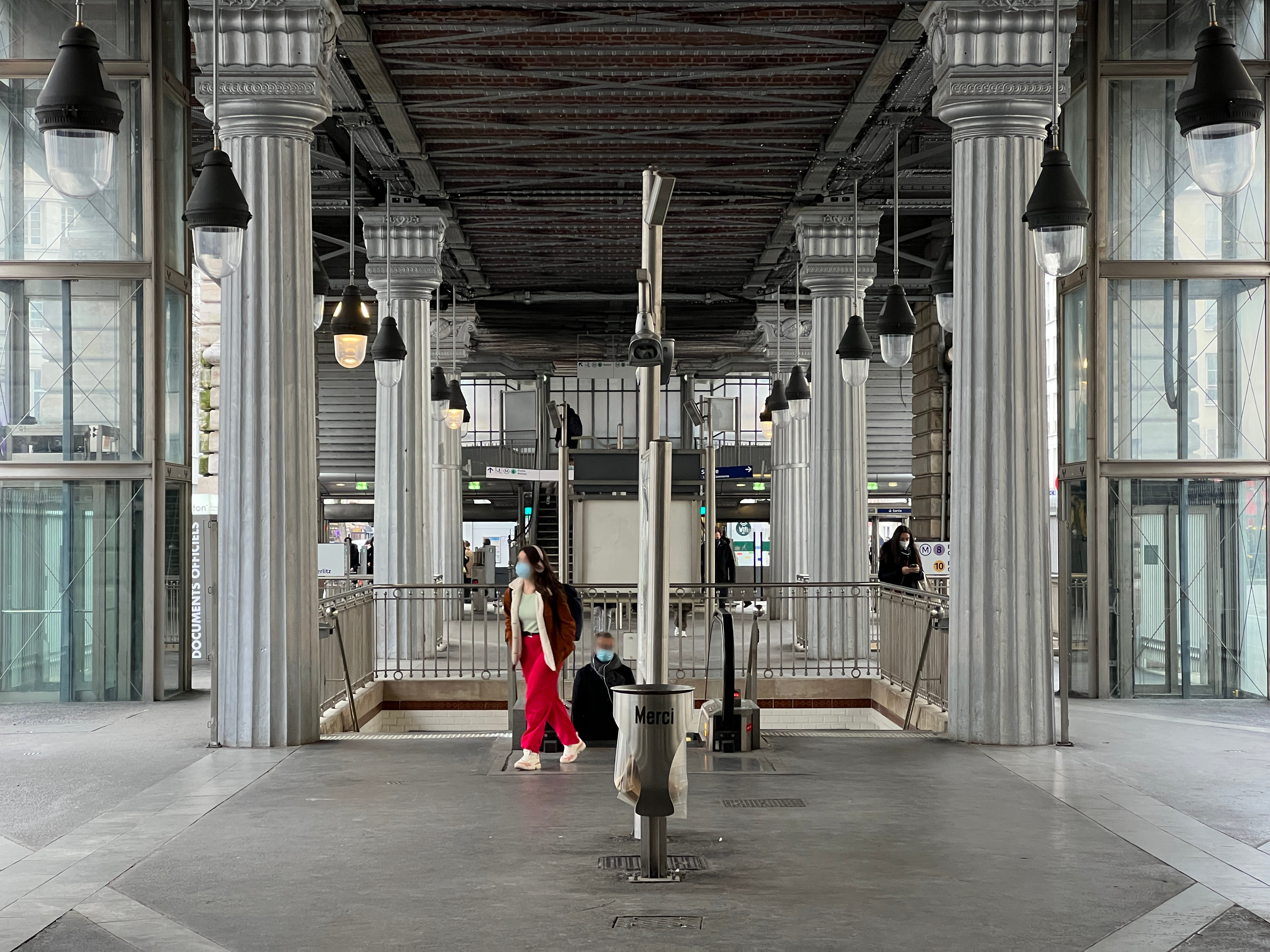
Under the platforms of Line 6

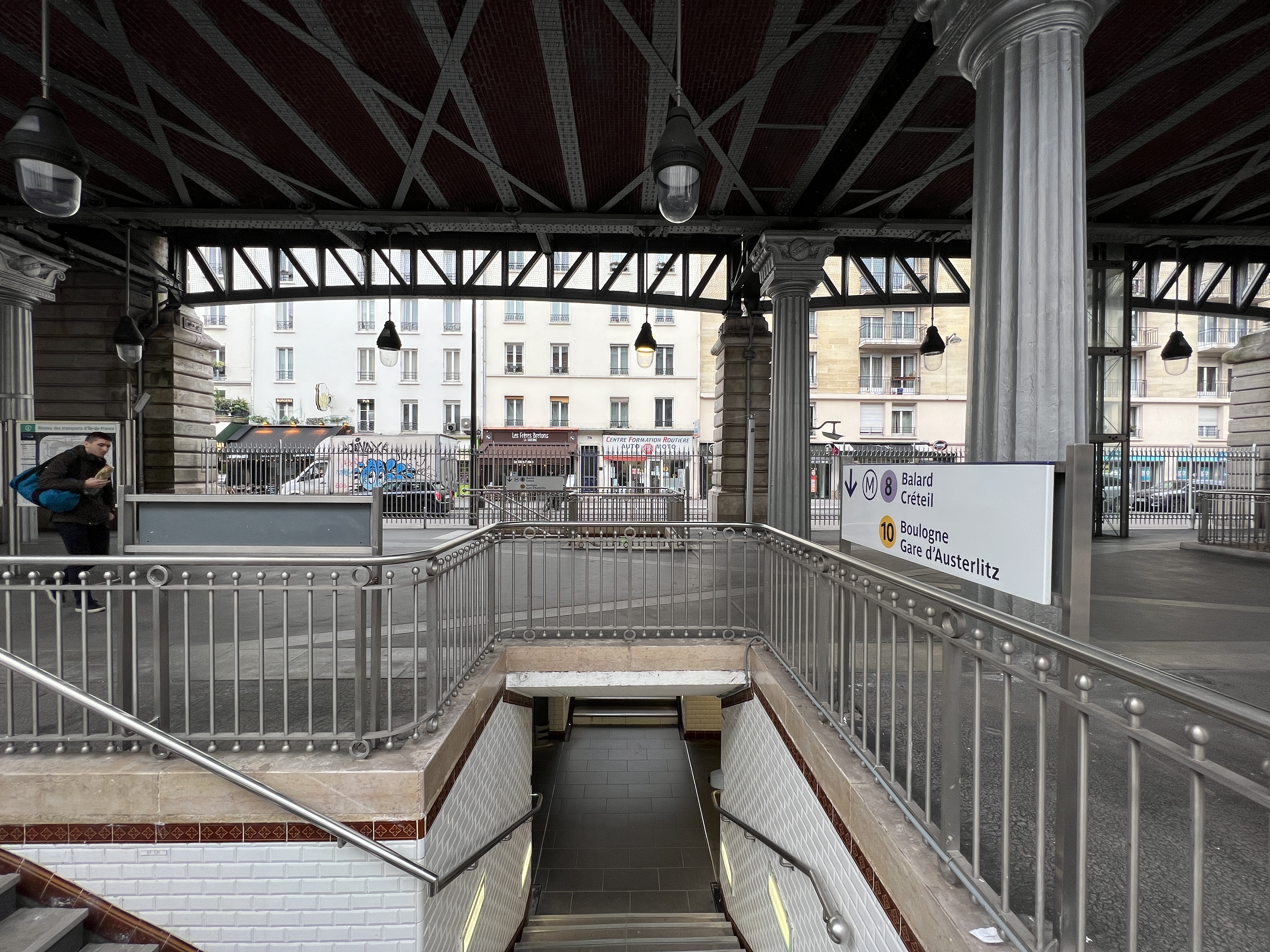
Access to lines 8 and 10

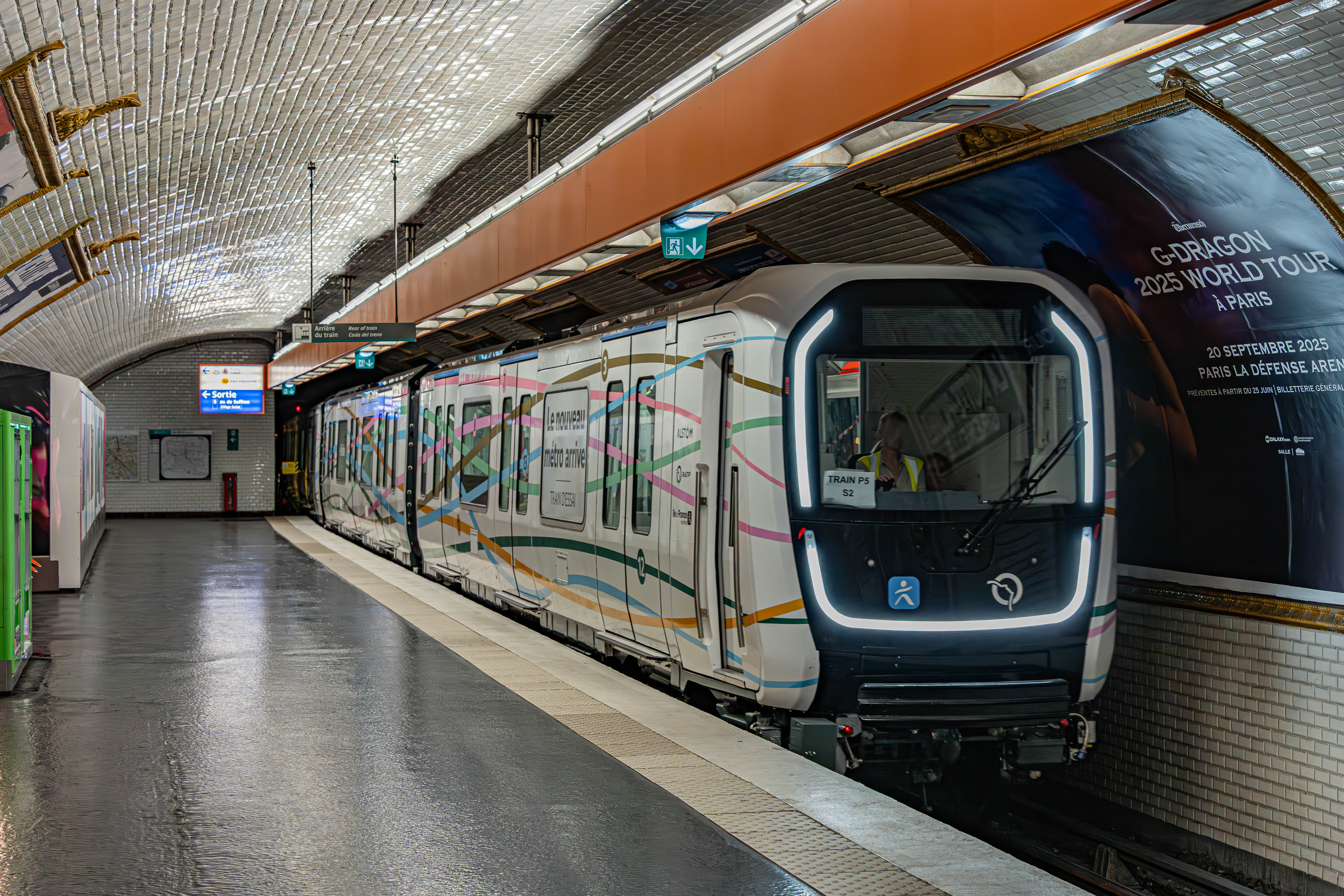
MF 19 on tests on Line 10, headed for Boulogne.
