= Avenue Émile Zola station =

Metro station in Paris, France

Avenue Émile Zola
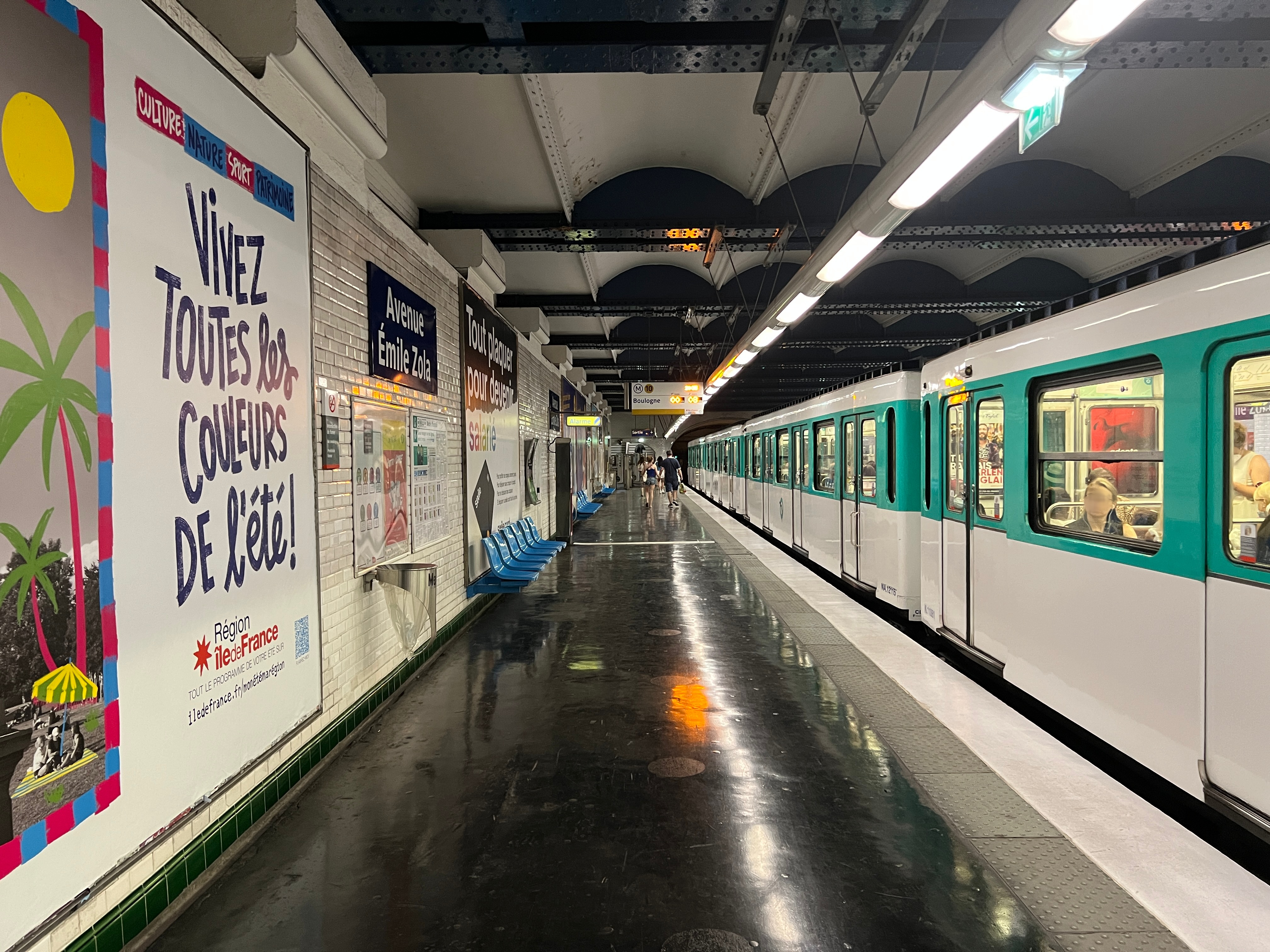
- MF 67 Avenue Émile Zola

General information
- Location: 15th arrondissement of Paris; Île-de-France; France
- Coordinates: 48°50′49″N 2°17′40″E
- System: Paris Métro station
- Owner: RATP
- Operator: RATP
- Line: Paris Metro Paris Metro Line 10
- Platforms: 2 (2 side platforms)
- Tracks: 2

Construction
- Accessible: no

Other information
- Station code: 17-06
- Fare zone: 1

History
- Opened: 13 July 1913
- Former names: Commerce (1913–1937)

Passengers
- 1,041,233 (2021)

Services
Preceding station	Paris Metro	Following station
Charles Michels towards Boulogne–Pont de Saint-Cloud	Line 10	La Motte-Picquet–Grenelle towards Gare d'Austerlitz
Location
- Location within Paris

Avenue Émile Zola (French pronunciation: [avny emil zɔla]) is a station on line 10 of the Paris Métro. Located in the 15th arrondissement, it is situated at the eastern end of avenue Émile Zola, at the intersection of the rue du Commerce and rue Fondary. The station is named after the nearby avenue Émile Zola, which in turn is named after Émile Zola (1840-1902), a prolific French writer during the 19th century.

== History ==
The station opened on 13 July 1913 with the name Commerce as part of the initial section of line 8 from Beaugrenelle (now Charles Michels) and Opéra. It was initially named after the nearby rue du Commerce which was the main shopping street of the former commune of Grenelle which was merged into the city of Paris in 1859.

On 27 July 1937, the section of line 8 between La Motte-Picquet–Grenelle and Porte d'Auteuil, including Avenue Émile Zola, was transferred to line 10 during the reconfiguration of lines 8, 10, and the old line 14. On the same day, the station was renamed Avenue Émile Zola to distinguish it from a new station also named Commerce that had opened on line 8, 300 metres south of the station. It is the last of three stations on the network that had its name changed as its original name hd been used for a newer station, after Saint-Placide (line 4) and Picpus (line 6). Initially, service between Porte d'Auteuil and Jussieu was not provided, with it being limited to La Motte-Picquet–Grenelle until the underground connection for line 10 was opened two days later, linking La Motte-Picquet–Grenelle and Duroc.

As part of the "Un métro + beau" programme by the RATP, the station's corridors and platform lighting were renovated and modernised on 13 November 2003.

In 2019, the station was used by 1,479,759 passengers, making it the 280th busiest of the Métro network out of 302 stations.

In 2020, the station was used by 823,178 passengers amidst the COVID-19 pandemic, making it the 263rd busiest of the Métro network out of 304 stations.

In 2021, the station was used by 1,041,233 passengers, making it the 280th busiest of the Métro network out of 304 stations.

== Passenger services ==
=== Access ===
The station has 2 accesses:

- Access 1: rue Fondary
- Access 2: rue du Commerce

=== Station layout ===
Street Level
B1	Mezzanine
Platform level	Side platform, doors will open on the right
Platform level	Westbound	← toward Boulogne – Pont de Saint-Cloud (Charles Michels)
Platform level	Eastbound	toward Gare d'Austerlitz (La Motte-Picquet – Grenelle) →
Platform level	Side platform, doors will open on the right

=== Platforms ===
The station has a standard configuration with 2 tracks surrounded by 2 side platforms.

=== Other connections ===
The station is also served at night by lines N12 and N61 of the Noctilien bus network.

== Gallery ==
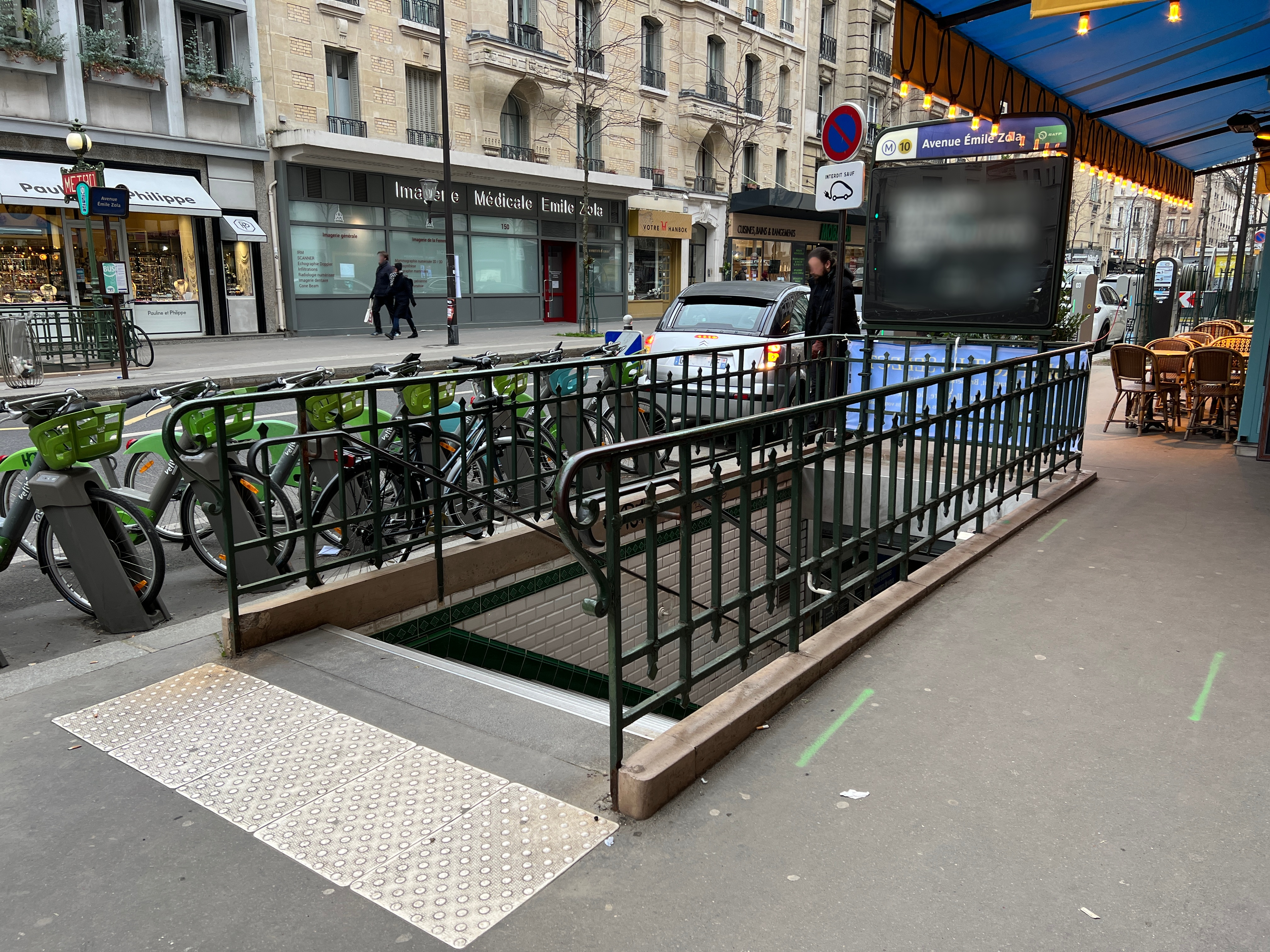
Access 1

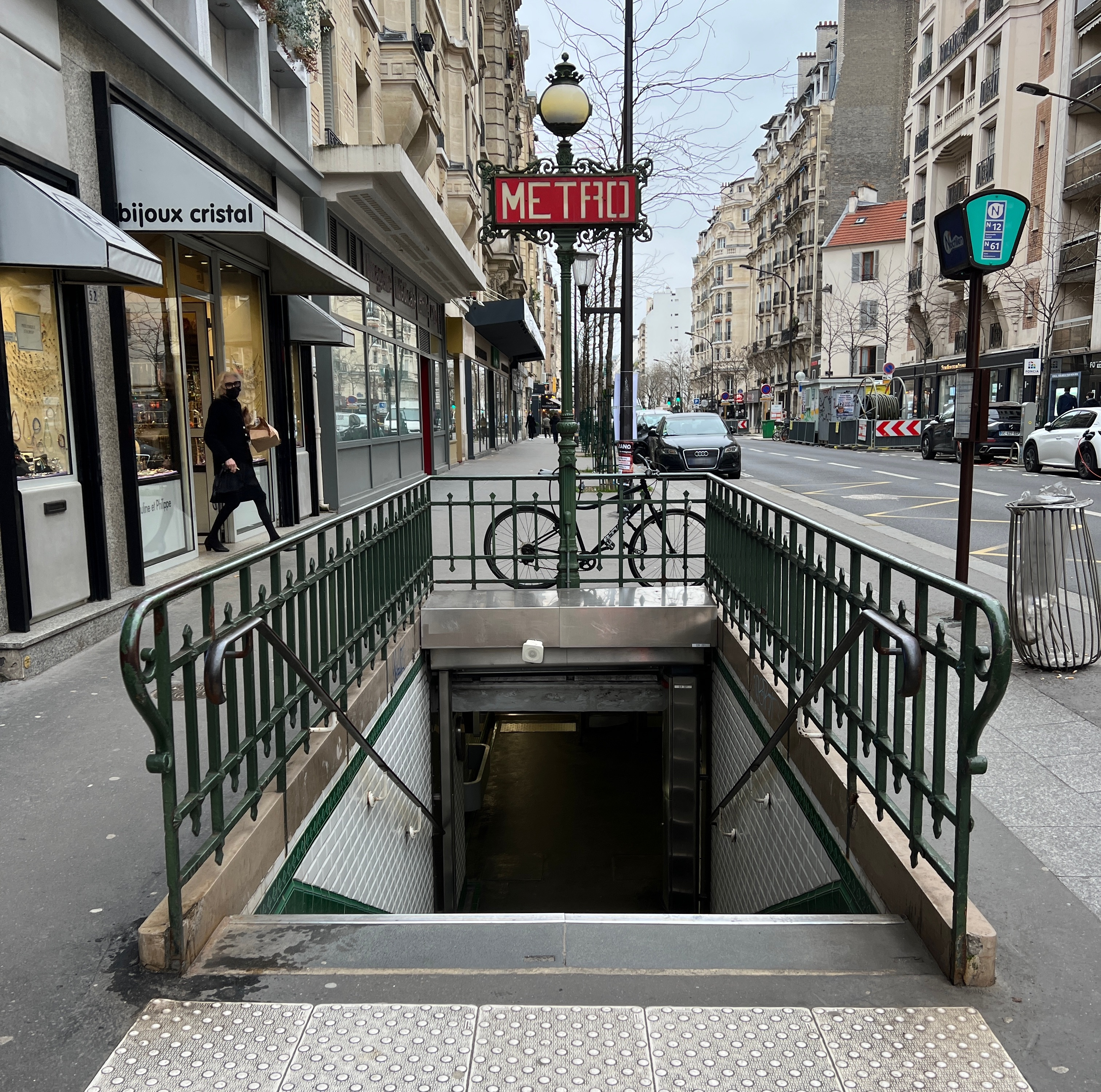
Access 2
