= Rue des Entrepreneurs, Paris =

Street in Paris, France

Rue des Entrepreneurs
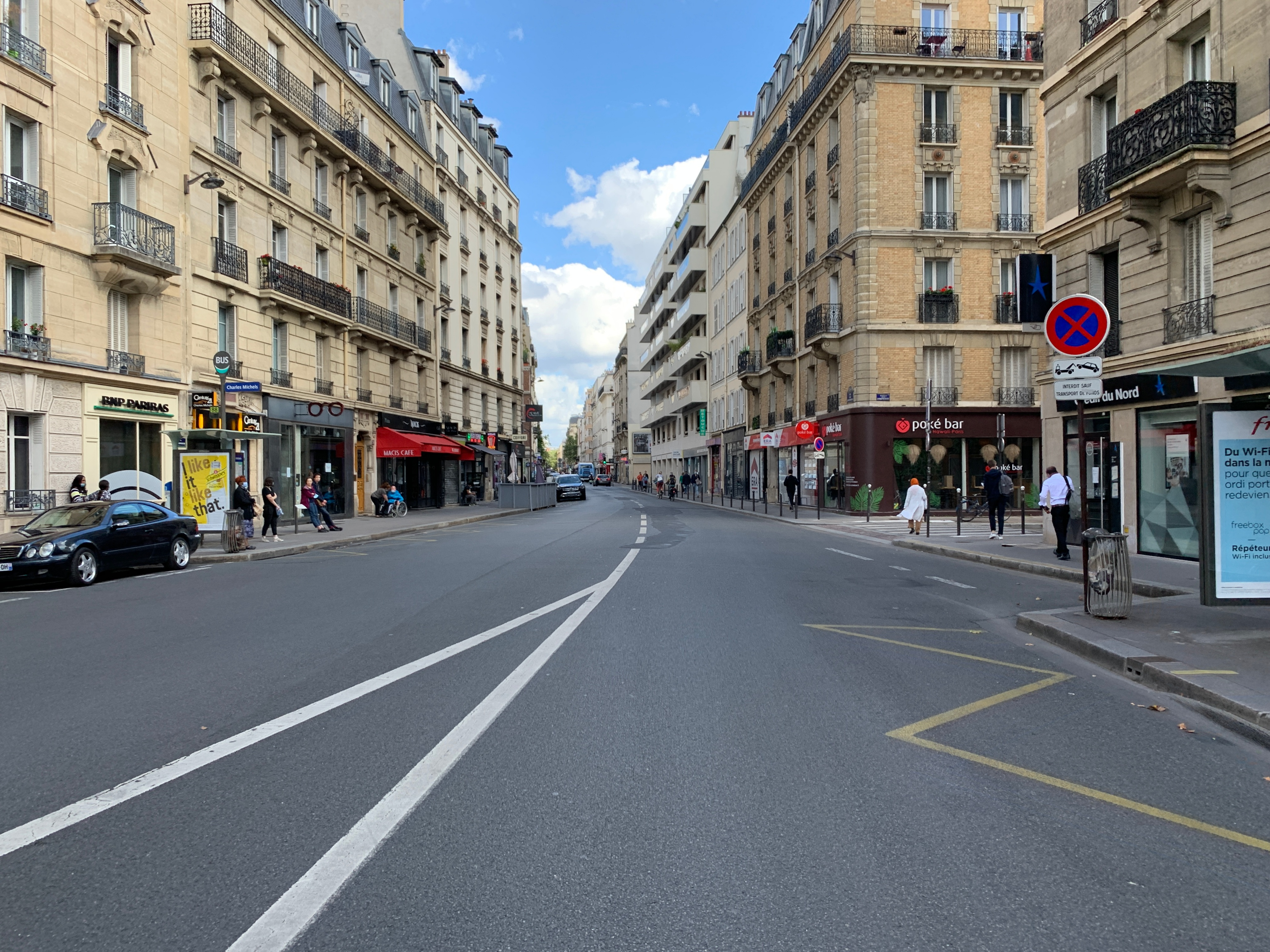
- Rue des Entrepreneurs in 2021
- Interactive map of Rue des Entrepreneurs
- Location: Paris, France
- Arrondissement: Paris 15th arrondissement

Other
- Known for: Diversity of architectural styles, mixing haussmannian buildings and modern constructions from the 1980s

The Rue des Entrepreneurs is a street in the 15th arrondissement of Paris, France. It runs from the Avenue Émile Zola (at no. 76) to the Rue de la Croix Nivert (at no. 102). It is about 800 metres long and 14 metres wide. Its name comes from the 19th-century entrepreneurs who owned land nearby after its creation in 1851.

The street displays a noticeable diversity of architectural styles, mixing haussmannian buildings and modern constructions from the 1980s.

Among remarkable monuments, there is the Church of Saint-Jean-Baptiste of Grenelle, built in 1828.
