= Orleans (disambiguation) =

Orléans is a city in north-central France, about 100 km south-west of Paris.

Orleans may also refer to:

== Places ==
=== Brazil ===
- Orleans, Santa Catarina

=== Canada ===
- Île d'Orléans, an island in the St. Lawrence River near Québec city
- Orleans, Ontario, a community which became part of the city of Ottawa in 2001
  - Orléans (federal electoral district)
  - Orléans (provincial electoral district)

=== United States ===
- Orleans, California
- Orleans, former name of Orleans Flat, California
- Orleans, Indiana
- Orleans, Iowa
- Orleans, Massachusetts, a New England town
  - Orleans (CDP), Massachusetts, village in the town
- Orleans, Minnesota
- Orleans, Missouri
- Orleans, Nebraska
- Orleans, New York
- Orleans, Vermont
- New Orleans, Louisiana, terminus with Orleans Parish
- Orleans County (disambiguation)
- Orleans Township (disambiguation)

== Other uses ==
- Orleans (band), a 1970s rock band
- Orléans (grape), a white grape variety
- Orleans (software framework), a framework for building scalable and robust distributed applications
- Orleans (TV series), a 1997 CBS television series
- Orléans Express, Canadian bus operator
- The Orleans, a hotel and casino in Las Vegas, Nevada
- US Orléans, a French football club
- Canal d'Orléans, a canal in France
- Charlotte Orléans, a fictional character
- "Orleans", a song by the American band Bright from the album The Miller Fantasies
- "Le Carillon de Vendôme", also known as "Orléans", a 15th-century French children's song, popularized by David Crosby in his 1971 album If I Could Only Remember My Name

== See also ==
- Duke of Orléans
- House of Orléans, French royal family
- Orleans station (disambiguation)
- Orlean (disambiguation)
