= Chardon Lagache station =

Paris Métro station

Chardon-Lagache
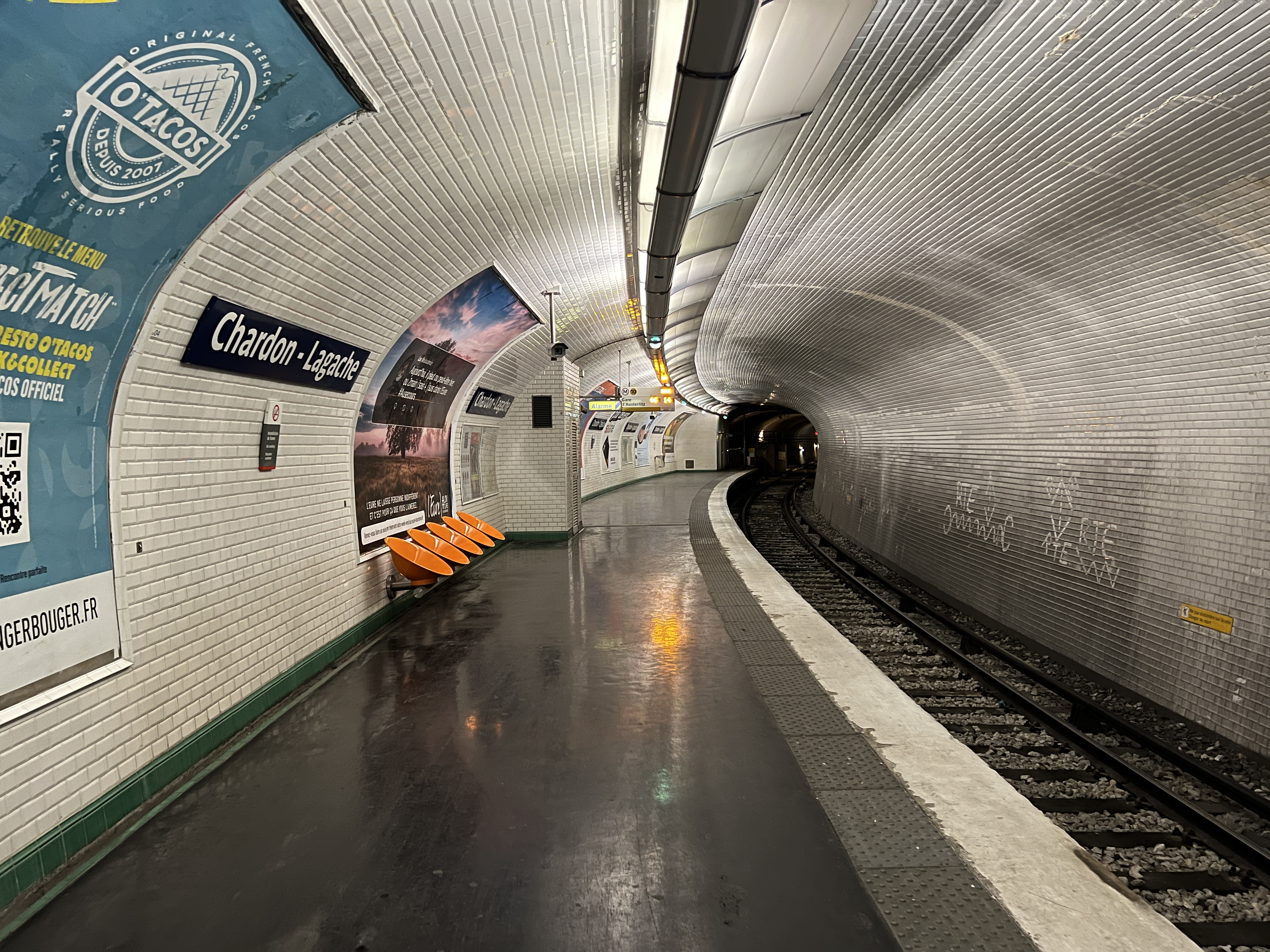
- Platform

General information
- Location: 16th arrondissement of Paris; Île-de-France; France
- Coordinates: 48°50′42″N 2°15′58″E
- System: Paris Métro station
- Owner: RATP
- Operator: RATP
- Line: Paris Metro Paris Metro Line 10
- Platforms: 1 (1 side platform)
- Tracks: 1

Construction
- Accessible: no

Other information
- Station code: 0711
- Fare zone: 1

History
- Opened: 30 September 1913

Passengers
- 482,053 (2021)

Services
Preceding station	Paris Metro	Following station
Michel-Ange–Molitor One-way operation	Line 10 Eastbound only	Mirabeau towards Gare d'Austerlitz
Location
- Location within Paris

Chardon Lagache (French pronunciation: [ʃaʁdɔ̃ laɡaʃ]) is a station on the Paris Métro in the 16th arrondissement, serving line 10 (eastbound only). It is named after the nearby rue Chardon Lagache, which was named after a local retirement home. It is one of the few métro stations to have been named after a woman, after Bagneux–Lucie Aubrac, Barbara, Barbès–Rochechouart, Boucicaut, Louise Michel, Madeleine, and Pierre et Marie Curie.

== History ==
The station opened on 30 September 1913 as part of the extension of line 8 from Charles Michels (then known as Beaugrenelle ) to Porte d'Auteuil. On 27 July 1937, the section of line 8 between La Motte-Picquet–Grenelle and Porte d'Auteuil, including Michel-Ange–Molitor was transferred to line 10 during the reconfiguration of lines 8, 10, and the old line 14. However, service between Porte d'Auteuil and Jussieu was not provided until two days later, on July 29, with service initially limited to La Motte-Picquet-Grenelle. Line 10 was also extended from Duroc to La Motte-Picquet–Grenelle on the same day.

As part of the "Renouveau du métro" programme by the RATP, the station's corridors was renovated and modernised on 18 May 2006.

In 2019, the station was used by 692,665 passengers, making it the 295th busiest of the Métro network out of 302 stations.

In 2020, the station was used by 331,901 passengers amidst the COVID-19 pandemic, making it the 295th busiest of the Métro network out of 305 stations.

In 2021, the station was used by 482,053 passengers, making it the 296th busiest of the Métro network out of 305 stations.

== Passenger services ==
=== Access ===
The station has a single Guimard entrance, rue Chardon Lagache Hôpital Sainte-Périne. It was listed as a historical monument on 12 February 2016. The corridors from the entrance to the mezzanine are unusually adorned with green ceramic friezes, typically seen on métro stations built by the Nord-Sud Company.

=== Station layout ===
Street Level
B1	Mezzanine
Platform level	Eastbound	toward Gare d'Austerlitz (Mirabeau) → (No service westbound: Michel-Ange – Molitor)
Platform level	Side platform, doors will open on the right

=== Platform ===
The station has a single curved side platform with a single tracks, only serving trains towards Gare d'Austerlitz.

=== Other connections ===
The station is also served by lines 22 and 62 of the RATP bus network, and at night, by lines N12 and N61 of the Noctilien network.

== Gallery ==
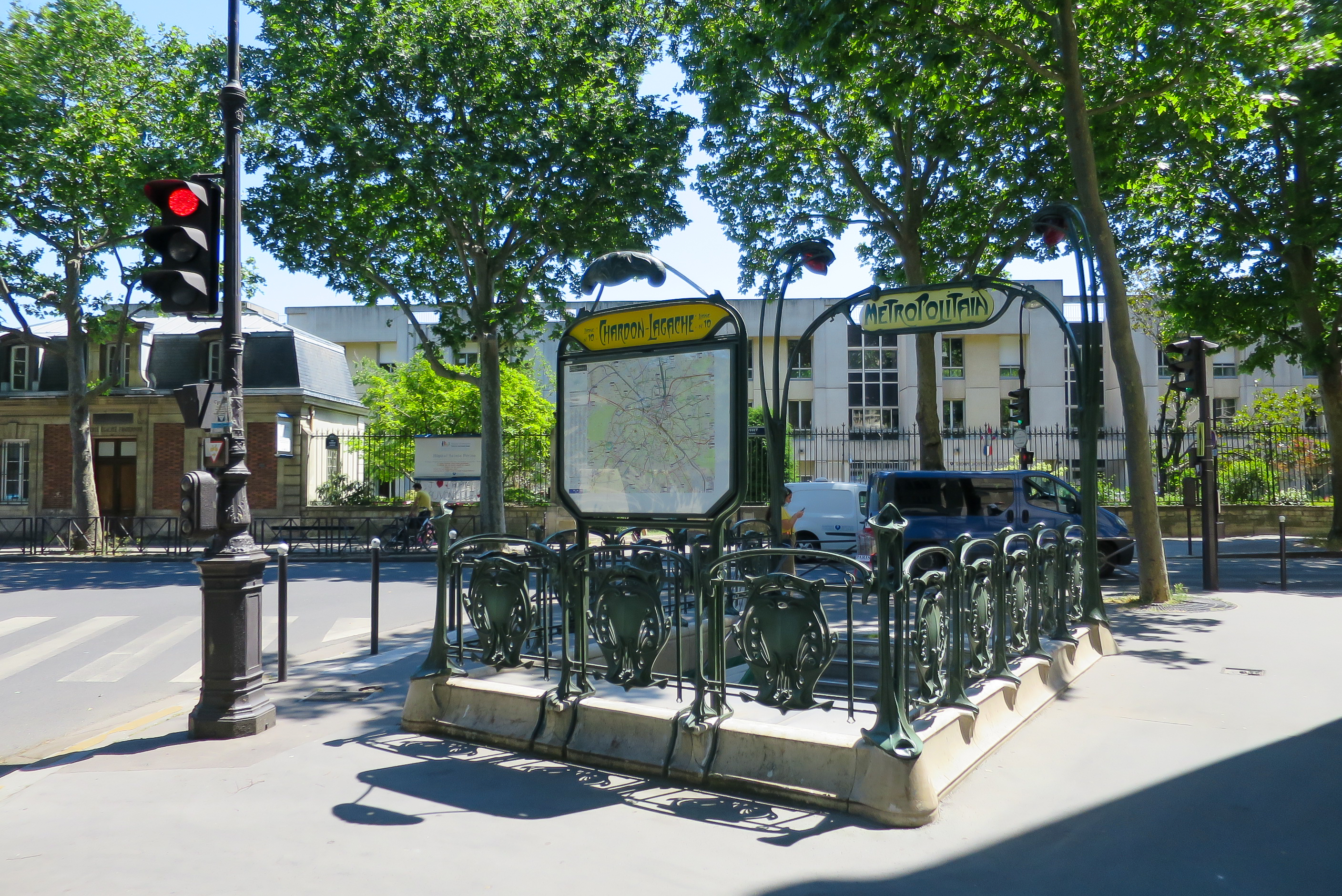
Guimard entrance

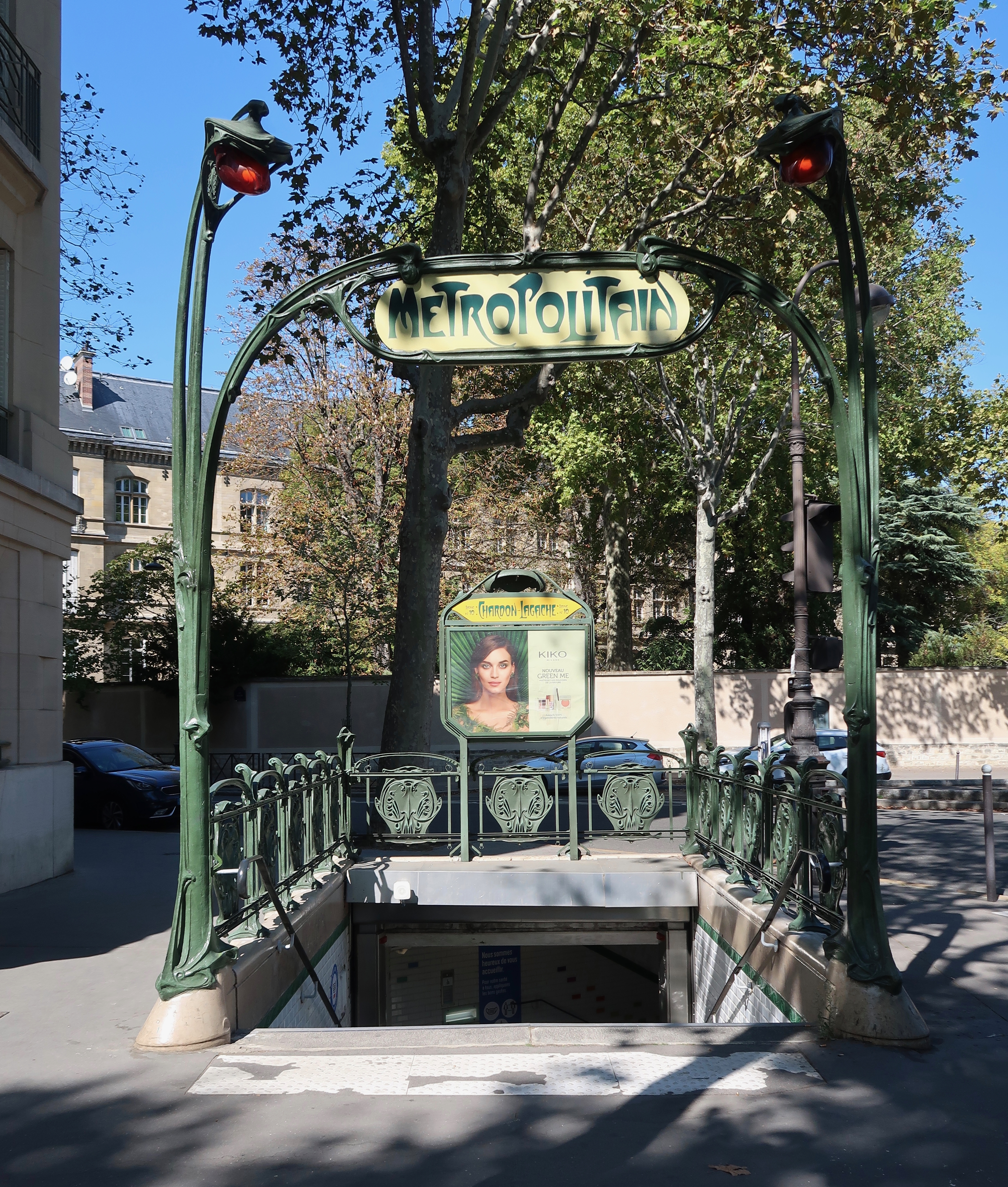
Another view of the entrance

A MF 19 leaving Chardon-Lagache.
