= Michel-Ange–Molitor station =

Metro station in Paris, France

Michel-Ange–Molitor
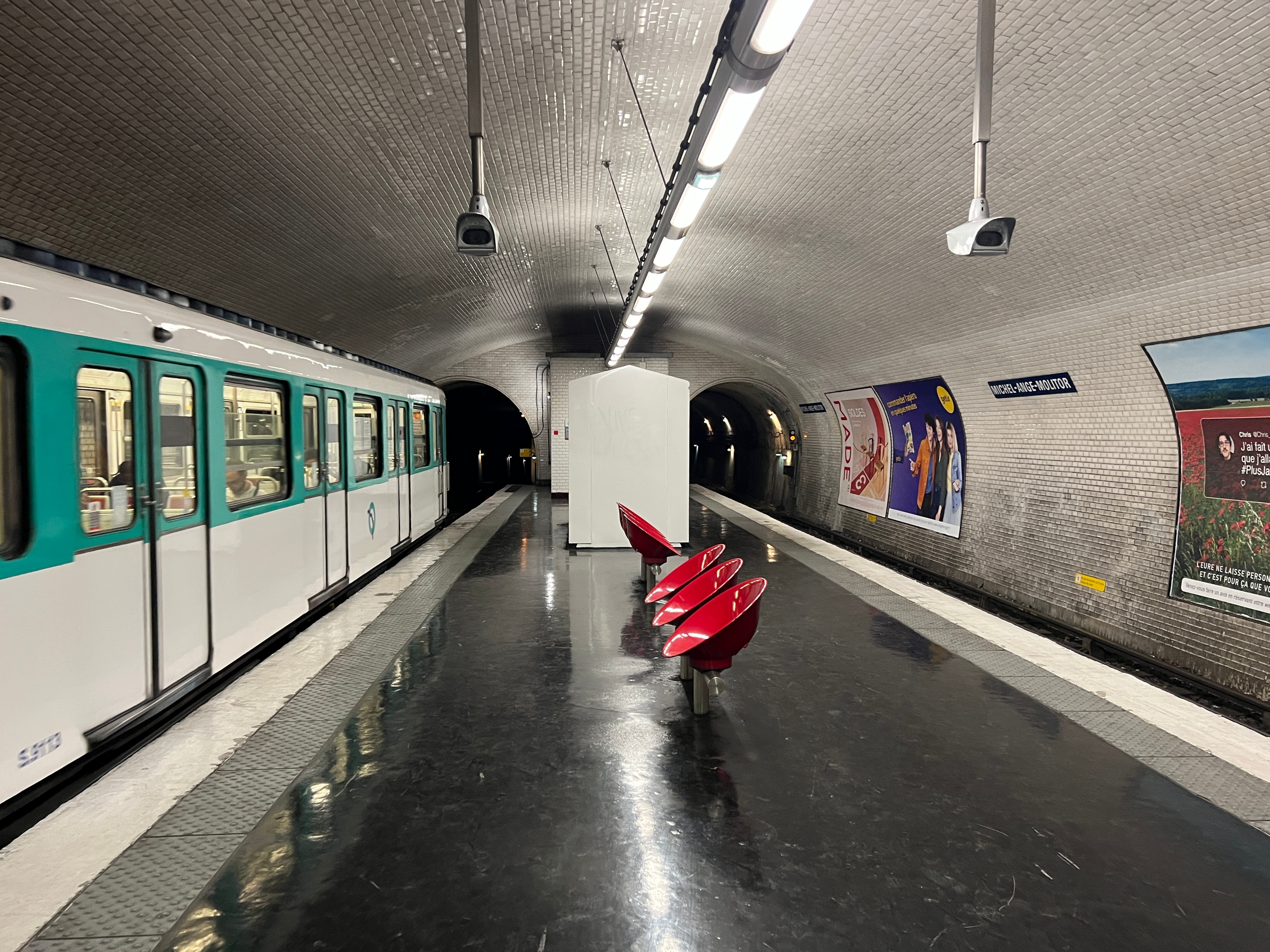
- MF 67 at line 10's platform

General information
- Location: 16th arrondissement of Paris; Île-de-France; France
- Coordinates: 48°50′42″N 2°15′40″E
- System: Paris Métro station
- Owner: RATP
- Operator: RATP
- Line: Paris Metro Paris Metro Line 9 Paris Metro Line 10
- Platforms: 3 (1 island platform, 2 side platforms)
- Tracks: 4

Construction
- Accessible: no

Other information
- Fare zone: 1

History
- Opened: 30 September 1913

Passengers
- 1,420,552 (2021)

Services
Preceding station	Paris Metro	Following station
Exelmans towards Pont de Sèvres	Line 9	Michel-Ange–Auteuil towards Mairie de Montreuil
Boulogne–Jean Jaurès One-way operation	Line 10 Eastbound only	Chardon Lagache towards Gare d'Austerlitz
Location
- Location within Paris

Michel-Ange–Molitor (French pronunciation: [mikɛlɑ̃ʒ mɔlitɔʁ]) is a station of the Paris Métro in the 16th arrondissement, serving as an interchange between Line 9 and Line 10 (eastbound only). It is named after the nearby rue Michel-Ange, which was in turn named after Michelangelo (the nearby Michel-Ange—Auteuil station was also named after him) as well as the nearby rue Molitor, which was named after Count Gabriel-Jean-Joseph Molitor (1770–1849), a Marshal of France.

== History ==
The station opened on 30 September 1913 when Line 8 was extended from Charles Michels (then called Beaugrenelle) to Porte d'Auteuil. Line 9's platforms opened on 8 November 1922 with the opening of the initial section of the line from Trocadéro to Exelmans. On 27 July 1937, the section of line 8 between La Motte-Picquet–Grenelle and Porte d'Auteuil, including Michel-Ange–Molitor was transferred to line 10 during the reconfiguration of lines 8, 10, and the old line 14. However, service between Porte d'Auteuil and Jussieu was not provided until two days later, on July 29, with service initially limited to La Motte-Picquet-Grenelle.

As part of the "Renouveau du métro" programme by the RATP, the station's corridors was renovated and modernised on 27 July 2010.

In 2019, the station was used by 2,247,014 passengers, making it the 231st busiest of the Métro network out of 302 stations.

In 2020, the station was used by 1,180,095 passengers amidst the COVID-19 pandemic, making it the 222nd busiest of the Métro network out of 305 stations.

In 2021, the station was used by 1,420,552 passengers, making it the 241st busiest of the Métro network out of 305 stations.

== Passenger services ==
=== Access ===
The station has a single access at rue Molitor and has a rare Val d'Osne totem.

=== Station layout ===
Street Level
B1	Mezzanine
Line 10 platform	Eastbound	No regular service (No service northbound: Porte d'Auteuil)
Line 10 platform	Island platform, doors will open on the left
Line 10 platform	Eastbound	toward Gare d'Austerlitz (Chardon Lagache) → (No service westbound: Boulogne–Jean Jaurès)
Line 9 platforms	Side platform, doors will open on the right
Line 9 platforms	Westbound	← toward Pont de Sèvres (Exelmans)
Line 9 platforms	Eastbound	toward Mairie de Montreuil (Michel-Ange–Auteuil) →
Line 9 platforms	Side platform, doors will open on the right

=== Platforms ===
The Line 9 station has a standard configuration with two tracks surrounded by two side platforms, and the vault is elliptical. The decoration is in the style used for most metro stations. The lighting canopies are white and rounded in the Gaudin style of the metro revival of the 2000s, and the bevelled white ceramic tiles cover the walls, the vault, and the tunnel exits. The advertising frames are made of honey-coloured earthenware with plant motifs and the name of the station is also incorporated into the wall tiles, in the interwar decorative style of the original CMP. The Motte style seats are blue in colour.

Line 10 has a particular configuration. Due to its location on the southern section of the Auteuil loop, it has two tracks framing an island platform, also of a classic length of seventy-five meters, which is only served in the direction of Gare d'Austerlitz, all under an elliptical vault. The track located to the north is used by the rare trains coming from Porte d'Auteuil (including the first daily service as well as the additional traffic at the end of the demonstrations at the Parc des Princes), the southern one being dedicated to the usual traffic of the line coming from Boulogne - Pont de Saint-Cloud. The decoration is a variant of the style used for most metro stations: traditional bevelled white ceramic tiles cover the vault, walls, and tunnel exits, while lighting is provided by a suspended tube band. The advertising frames are metal, and the name of the station is inscribed on enamelled plaques, in capital letters on the walls, and in Parisine font on the island platform. The Akiko style seats are burgundy in colour.

This decoration is almost identical to that of the neighbouring station of line 10, Michel-Ange - Auteuil, located on the other section of the loop.

=== Other connections ===
The station is also served by line 62 (only in the direction of Porte de France) of the RATP bus network.

== Gallery ==
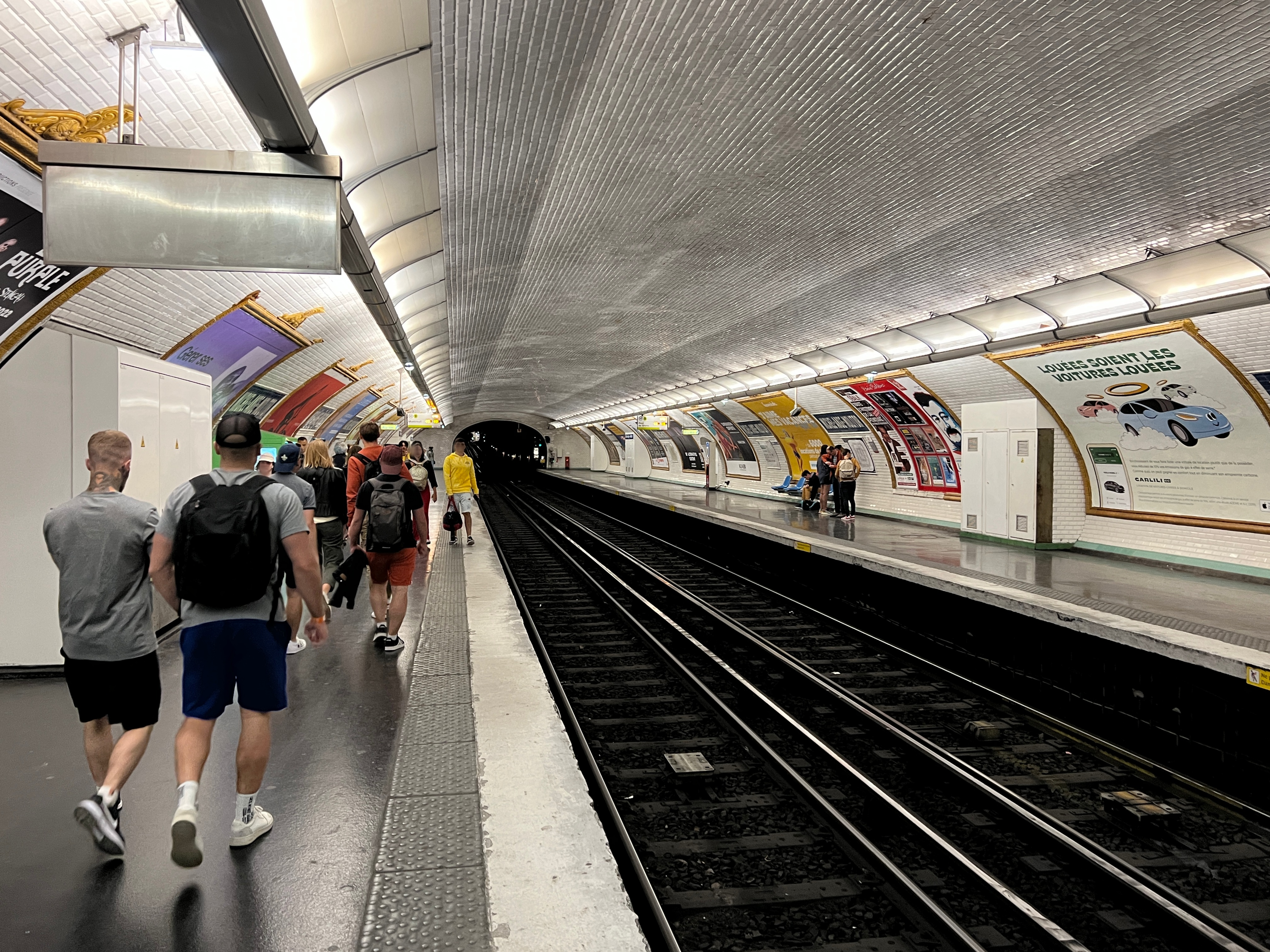
Line 9's platforms

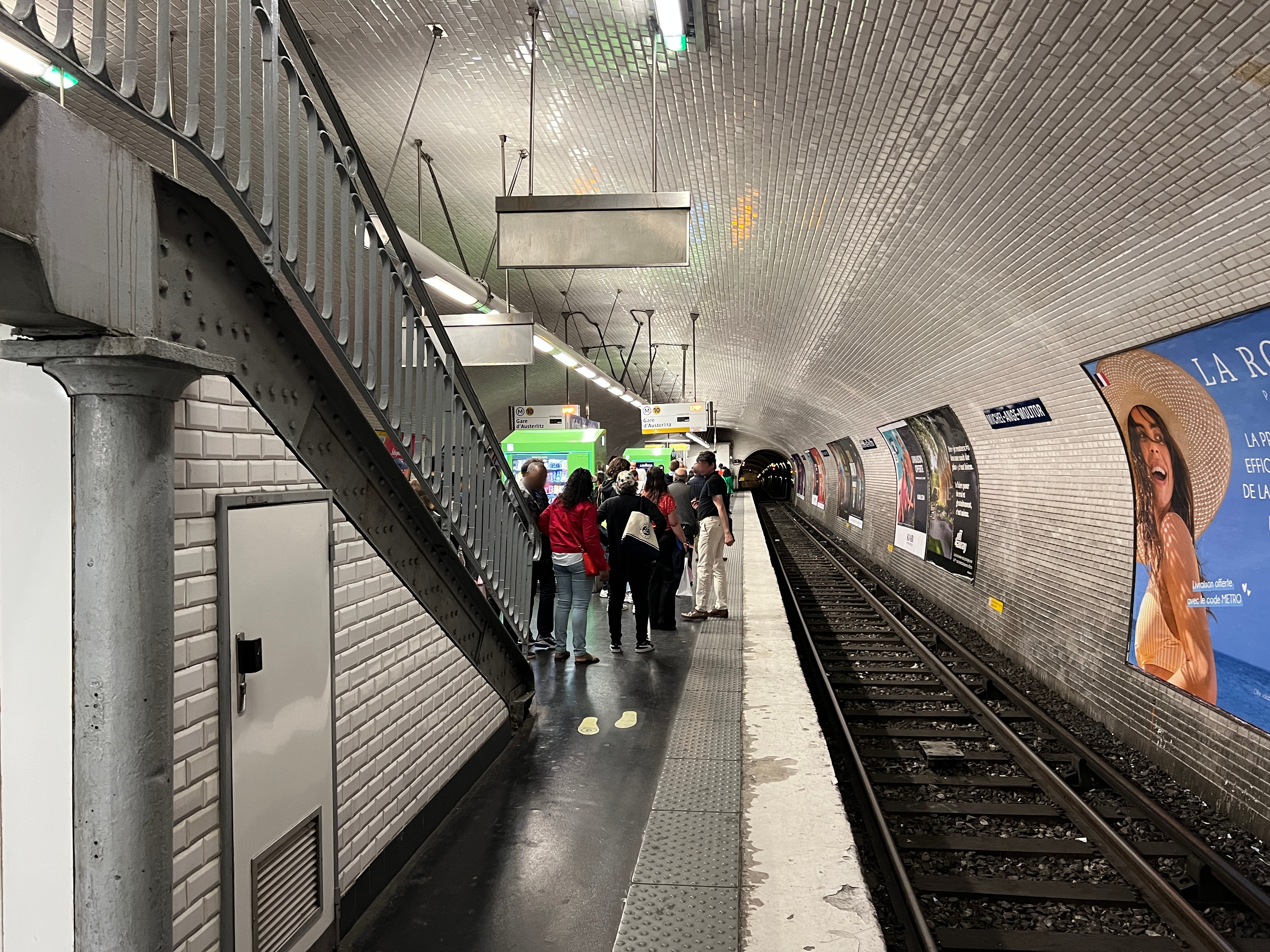
Other view of line 10's platform

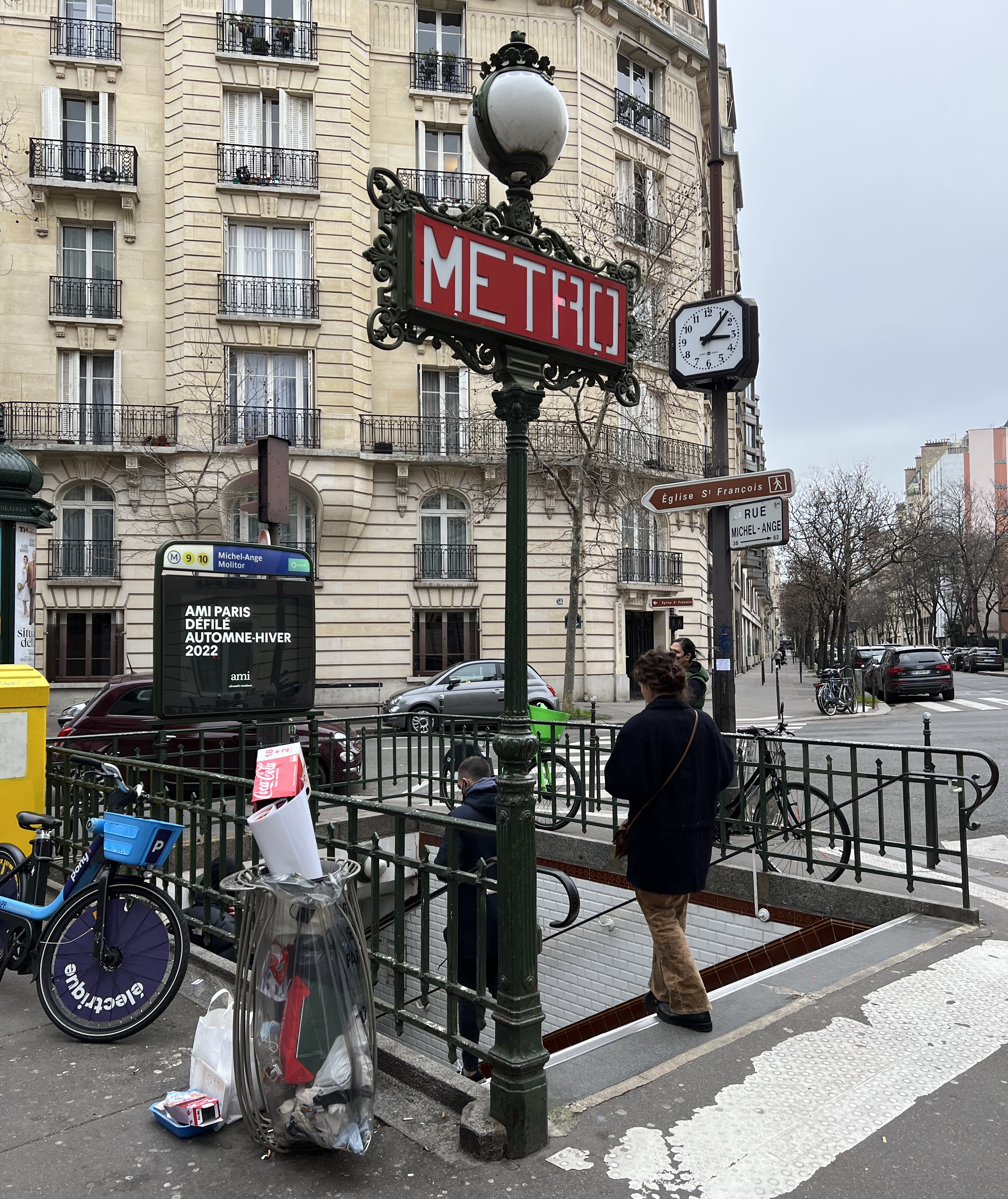
Access
