= Porte d'Auteuil station =

Metro station in Paris, France

Porte d'Auteuil
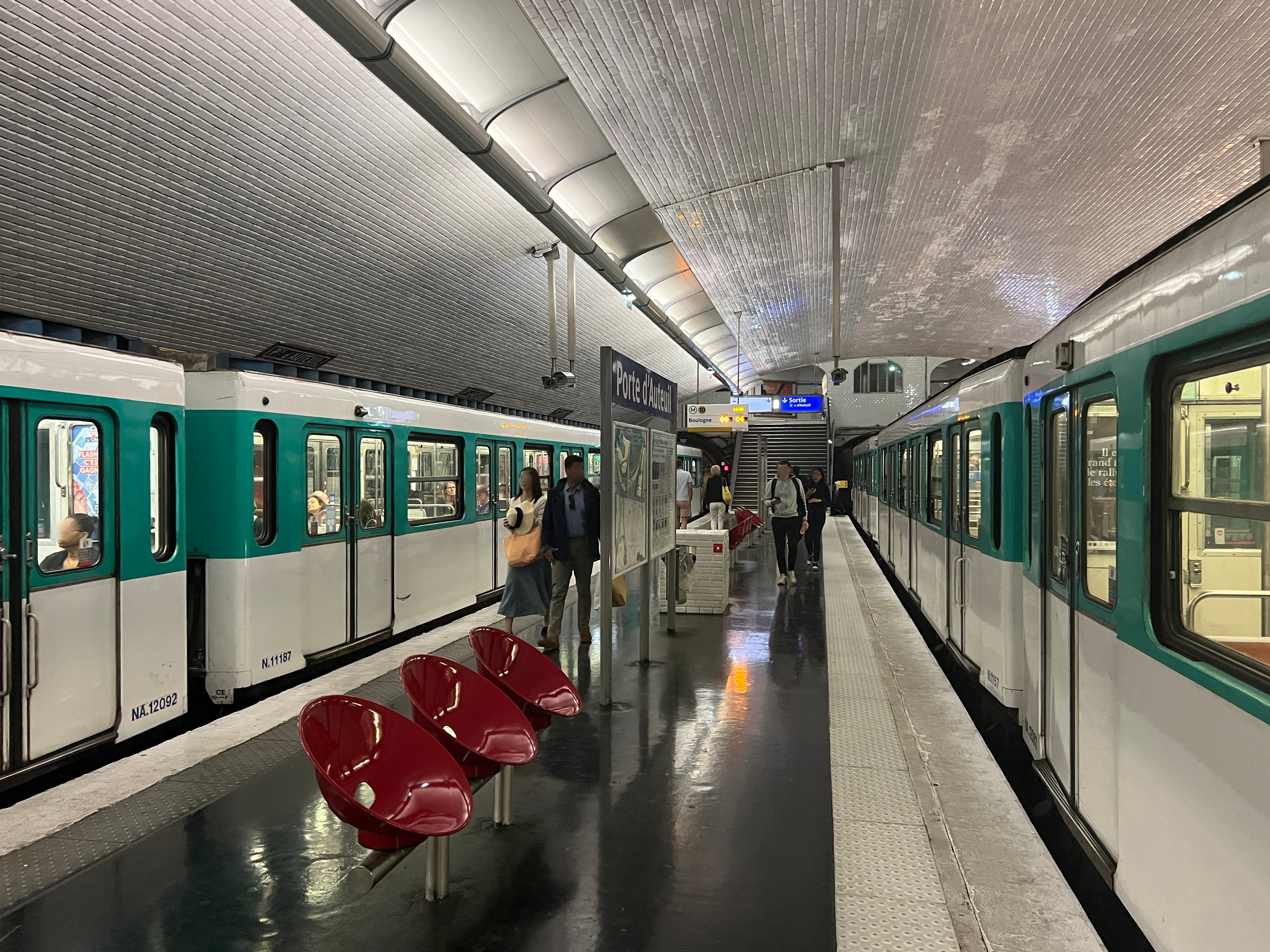
- MF 67 rolling stock at Porte d'Auteuil

General information
- Location: 16th arrondissement of Paris; Île-de-France; France
- Coordinates: 48°50′53″N 2°15′32″E
- System: Paris Métro station
- Owner: RATP
- Operator: RATP
- Line: Paris Metro Paris Metro Line 10
- Platforms: 2
- Tracks: 3

Construction
- Accessible: no

Other information
- Fare zone: 1

History
- Opened: 30 September 1913

Services
Preceding station	Paris Metro	Following station
Boulogne–Jean Jaurès towards Boulogne–Pont de Saint-Cloud	Line 10 Westbound only	Michel-Ange–Auteuil One-way operation
Location
- Location within Paris

Porte d'Auteuil (French pronunciation: [pɔʁt dotœj]; lit. 'Gate of Auteuil') is an underground station on Line 10 of the Paris Métro. It is situated in the 16th arrondissement, on the edge of the Bois de Boulogne. It offers westbound services only, in the direction of Boulogne–Pont de Saint-Cloud.

In 2019, 622,094 travellers entered the metro system at Porte d'Auteuil, ranking it 296th of 302 stations. In 2020, amidst the COVID-19 pandemic, traffic fell to 262,784, in 298th place of 304. In 2021, 375,748 travellers entered, 299th of 304 stations.

== History ==
The station opened on 30 September 1913 as the new terminus of Line 8 when it was extended west under the Seine from Beaugrenelle (now Charles Michels). On 29 July 1937, the section of Line 8 between and Porte d'Auteuil and La Motte-Picquet–Grenelle became part of Line 10. On 3 October 1980, Line 10 was extended west from Porte d'Auteuil to Boulogne–Jean Jaurès.

The station is named after the Porte d'Auteuil, a gate in the 19th-century Thiers wall. The commune of Auteuil was organized in 1790, comprising the area between the Seine and the Bois de Boulogne from the present-day Pont de Grenelle to the Pont de Sèvres. When Paris annexed its nearby suburbs in 1860, the commune was divided: the northern half became the district of Auteuil in the new 16th arrondissement. The southern half was absorbed into the commune of Boulogne-Billancourt.

=== Boucle d'Auteuil (Auteuil Loop) ===
The engineers who designed the first lines of the Paris metro opted for loops (boucles), at their terminal stations. Though more expensive to build, they facilitated faster and safer turnarounds. When, circa 1905, plans were made to build out Lines 7 and 8 to their terminals at the city limits, the loops were distended to site additional stations in the nearby districts of Pré-Saint-Gervais and Auteuil. These offered proximate metro access to a larger area of neighborhoods which had been relegated to the end of the network construction schedule.

For Line 8, the path was a one-way loop, followed counter-clockwise. After crossing under the Seine from the Left Bank, westbound trains ran mostly under the Rue d'Auteuil with stops at Église d'Auteuil and Michel-Ange–Auteuil to the terminus at Porte d'Auteuil. The loop then curved south under the Allée des Fortifications, then east to return under Rue Molitor and Rue Mirabeau, with stops at Michel-Ange–Molitor, Chardon Lagache, and Mirabeau before returning to the double-tracked tunnel under the Seine.

When Line 10 was extended to Boulogne–Jean Jaurès, Porte d'Auteuil ceased to be a terminus and became a westbound way station. However, trains sometimes still take the pre-1980 route directly into the Boucle to Michel-Ange–Molitor and thence to Gare d'Austerlitz. This happens only during rush hours, or if an incident or maintenance impacts the route towards Boulogne. Occasionally, eastbound trains are added at Porte d'Auteuil for the first service, or during sports events at the Parc des Princes, Stade Jean-Bouin or during Roland-Garros. Evenings during the 2024 Olympics the station served as the primary Line 10 terminal, with fewer trains to Boulogne–Pont de Saint-Cloud.

As construction in Auteuil was getting under way in 1910, planners envisaged distending the Line 8 Boucle further south to a new terminus adjacent to the planned Line 9 terminus at Porte de Saint Cloud, plus a station at Porte Molitor. By the time metro construction resumed after the war, however, the plan had been revised to become a looped service tunnel between the two lines. One tunnel hosted underground maintenance shops (the Ateliers d'Auteuil), the other a platform at Porte Molitor to be used only by special shuttles servicing sports events at the Parc des Princes. Ultimately, the station plan was discarded, its access to the surface never dug, and the tunnel used primarily as a garage. Porte Molitor and Haxo (on the unimplemented distension of the Line 7 loop to Porte de Lilas) are the only unused "ghost stations" not transited by regular trains.

== Station layout ==
The station has three ground level entrances, widely separated by motor vehicle traffic. There is no public passage under the traffic: to walk underground from one entrance to another, one must enter the metro system. The original entrance is the easternmost, at Rue d'Auteuil and Boulevard Exelmans. It was done in the Art Nouveau Guimard style, thus listed as a monument historique. The two westernmost entrances, at the Hippodrome and at the Boulevard Murat bus stand, were opened in the 1930s after the demolition of the Thiers wall and the construction of Place de la Porte d'Auteuil over its foundations. Their entrances feature the balustrades and candelabra signposts characteristic of those years.

Because Porte d'Auteuil was originally built as a terminus, it has two platforms separating three trackbeds. Today, trains normally use the northern track and passengers use only the northern platform. The central track is used by the occasional trains that turn directly south and east via the boucle.

Street Level

B1	Mezzanine

Line 10 platform	Westbound	← toward Boulogne–Pont de Saint-Cloud (Boulogne–Jean Jaurès) (No service from eastbound: Michel-Ange–Auteuil) (No service southbound: Porte Molitor) (No service eastbound: Michel-Ange–Molitor) (No service from northbound: Jasmin)
Line 10 platform	Island platform, doors will open on the left, right
Line 10 platform	Westbound	← toward Boulogne–Pont de Saint-Cloud (Boulogne–Jean Jaurès) or Gare d'Austerlitz (Michel-Ange–Molitor) (No service from eastbound: Michel-Ange–Auteuil) (No service southbound: Porte Molitor) (No service outbound: Porte de Saint-Cloud)
Line 10 platform	Island platform, doors will open on the left, right
Line 10 platform	Westbound	← No regular service (No service from eastbound: Michel-Ange–Auteuil) (No service eastbound: Michel-Ange–Molitor)

== Tourism ==
- Across the street north from the metro entrance at Boulevard Exelmans is the Auteuil-Boulogne station of the Petite Ceinture railway, closed in 1985 and subsequently modified and repurposed as a restaurant. Behind the station, the railway's former right-of-way is now a linear park that extends for one kilometer to the Jardin de Ranleigh. The park, the Petite Ceinture du 16e arrondissement, runs parallel to and is accessed from the Boulevard de Montmorency.
- Stade Roland Garros, home to the French Open tennis tournament
- Parc des Princes, home to Paris Saint-Germain FC
- Stade Jean-Bouin, home to Stade Français
- Jardin des Serres d'Auteuil
- Auteuil Hippodrome
- Bois de Boulogne

== Gallery ==
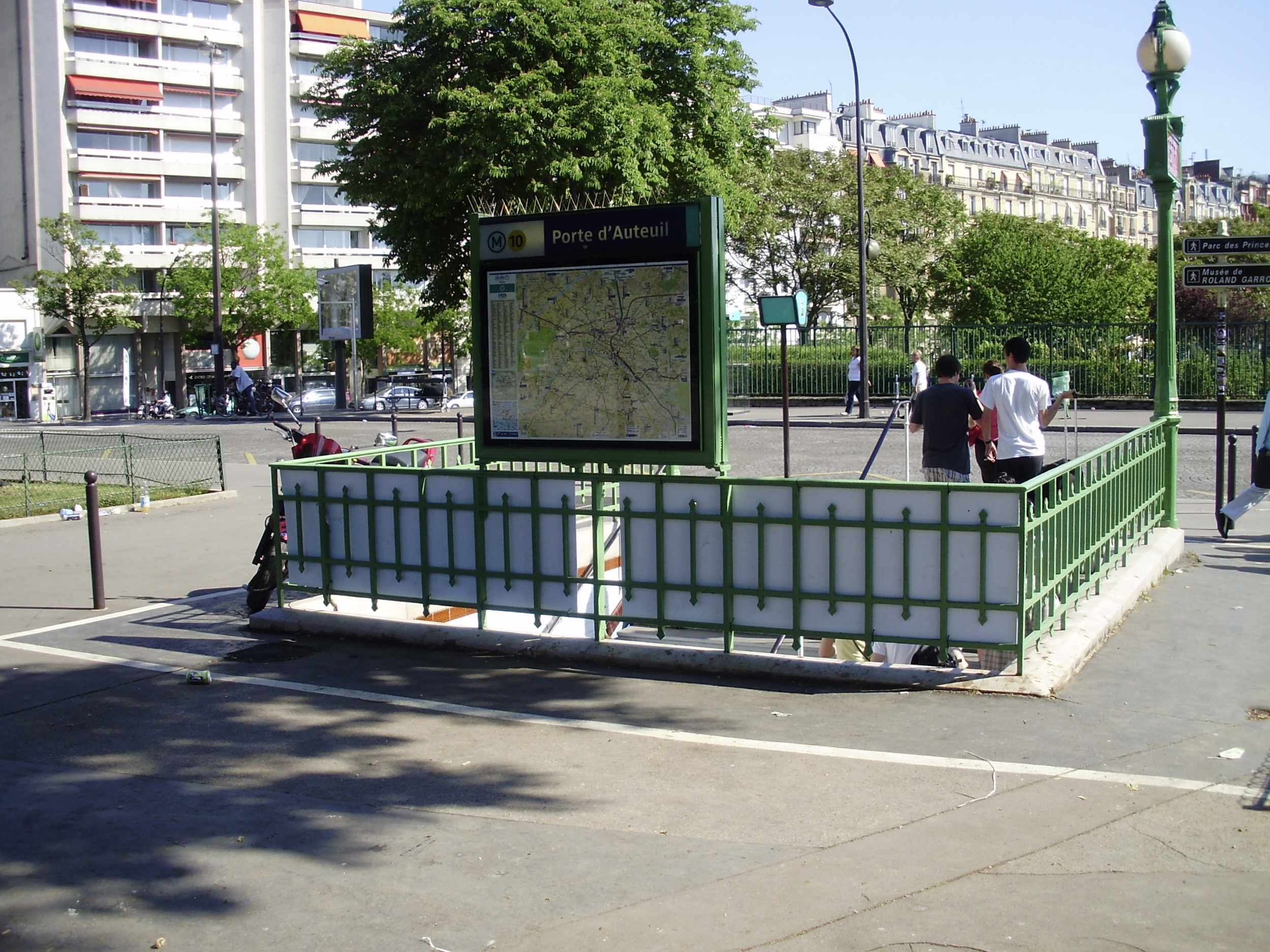
Street-level entrance at Boulevard Murat.

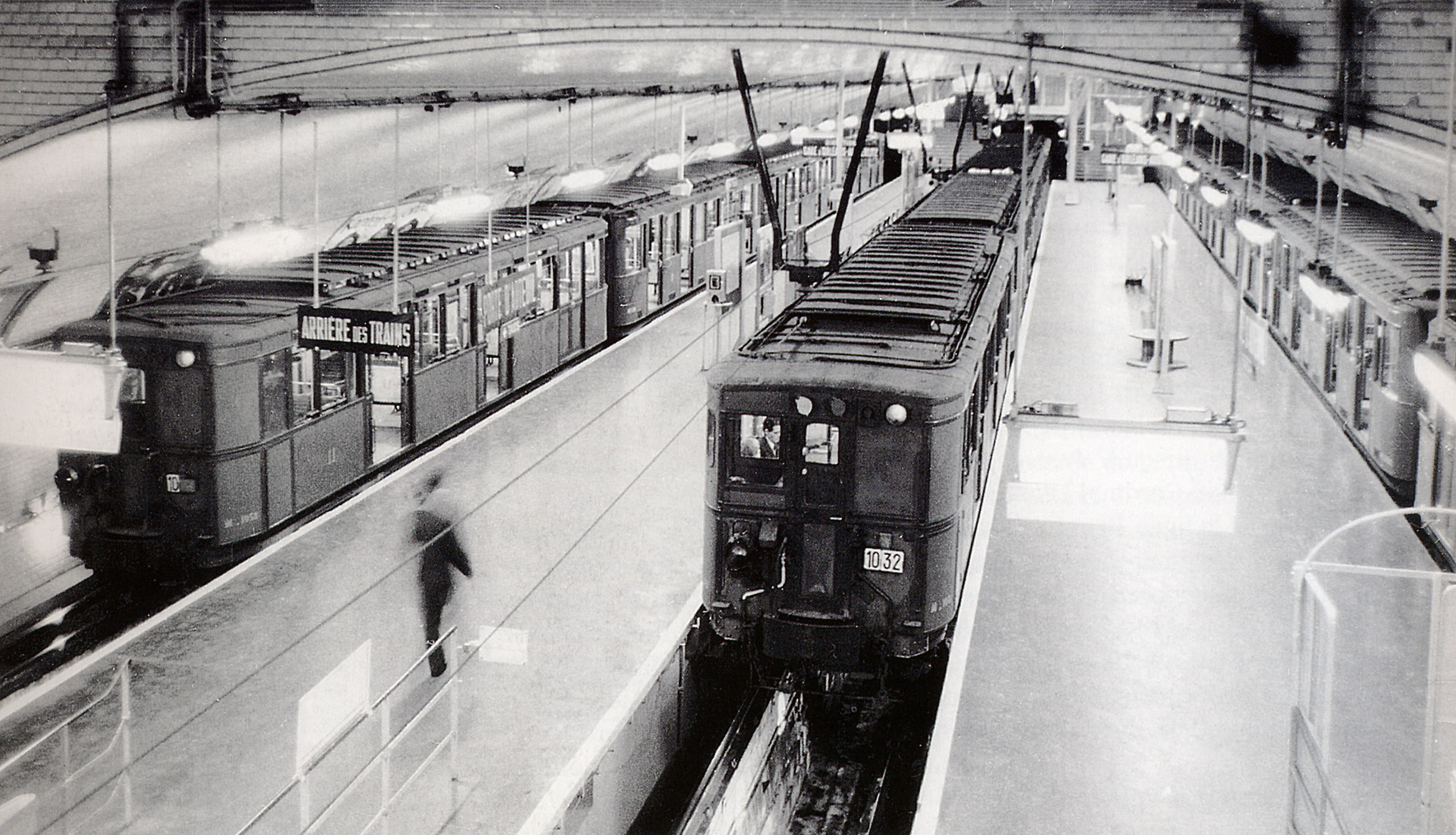
Porte d'Auteuil c. 1970

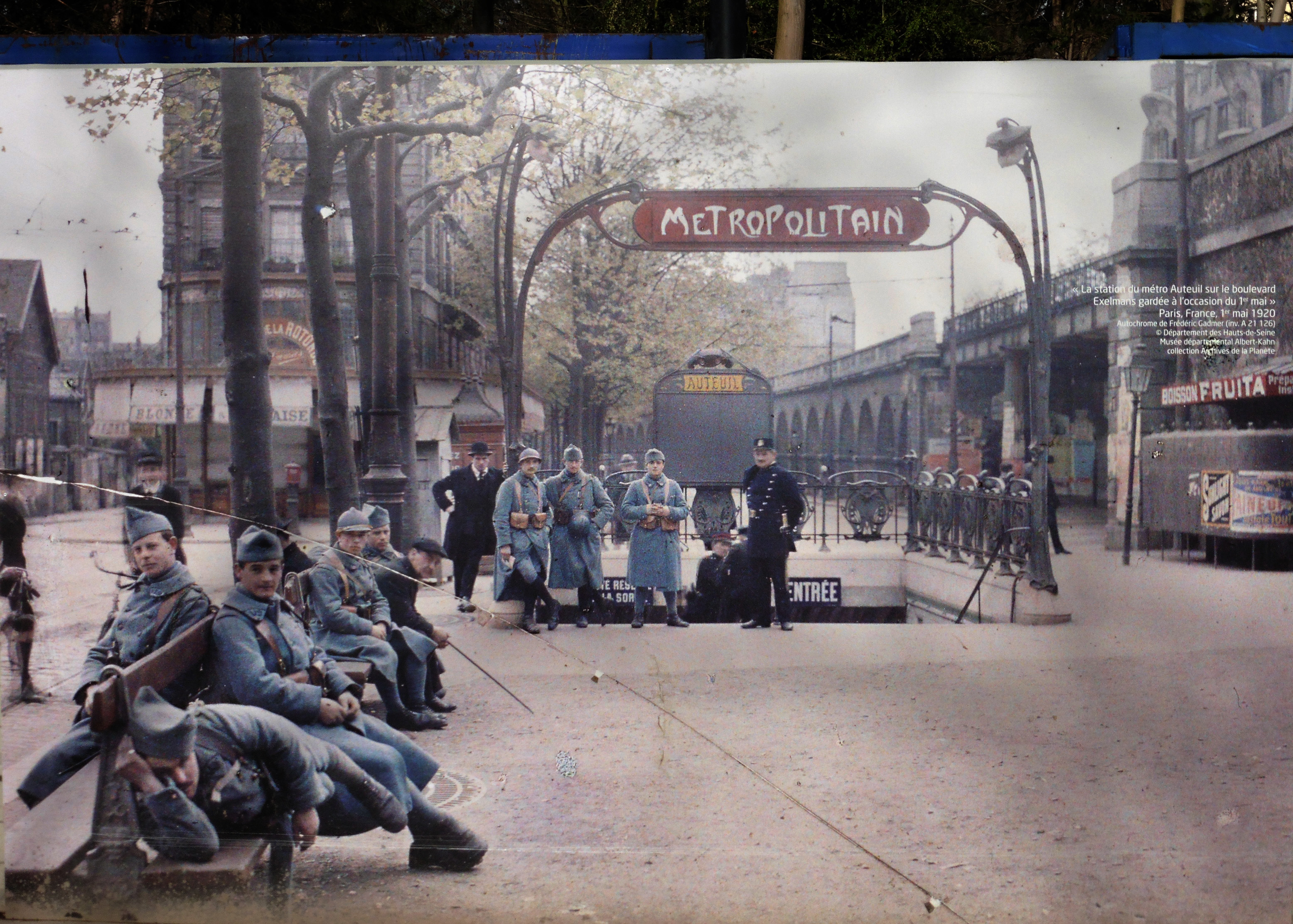
The original entrance at Rue d’Auteuil and Boulevard Exelmans, 1920

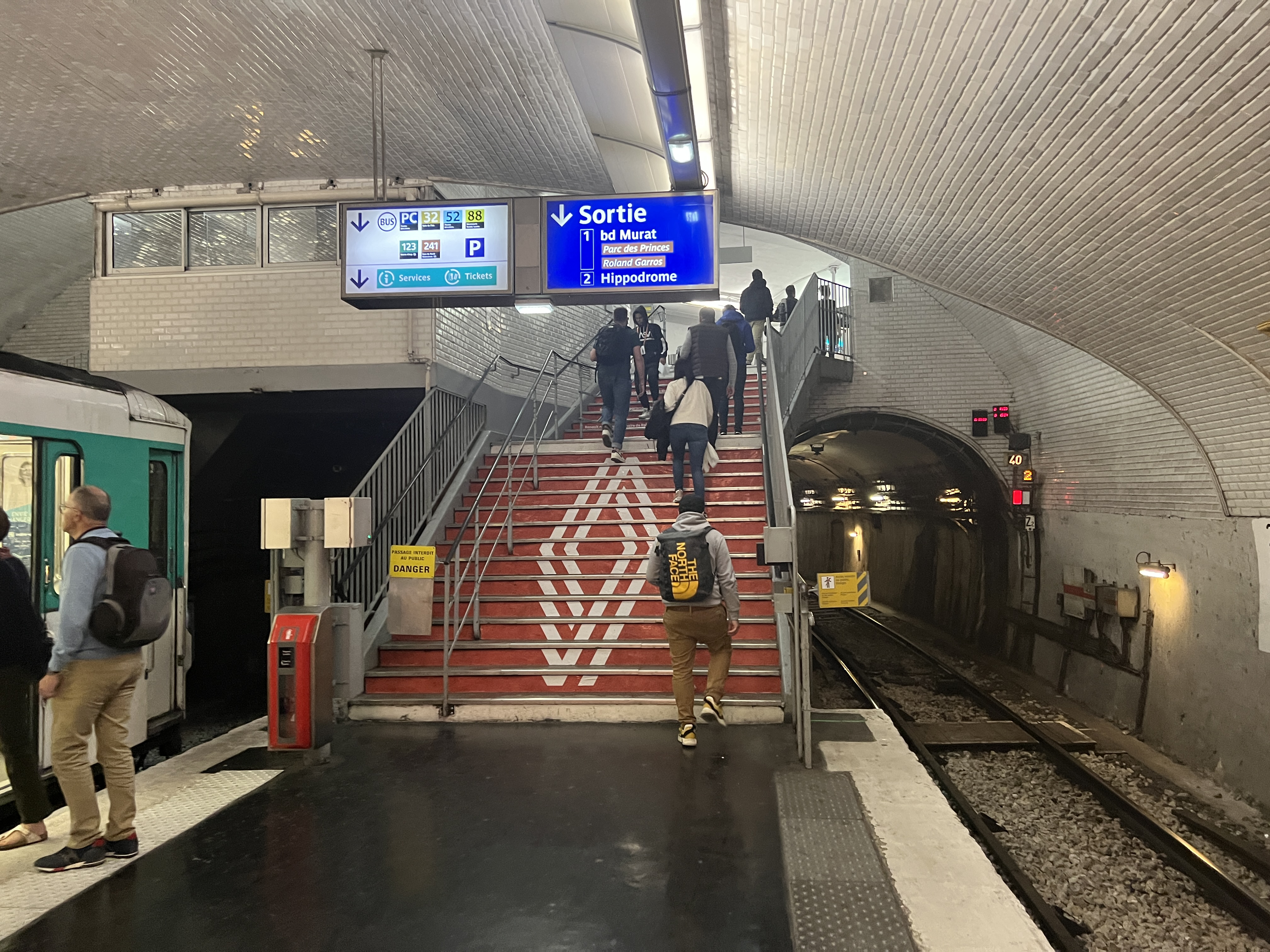
A MF 67 at Porte d'Auteuil, with a Renault ad on the stairs

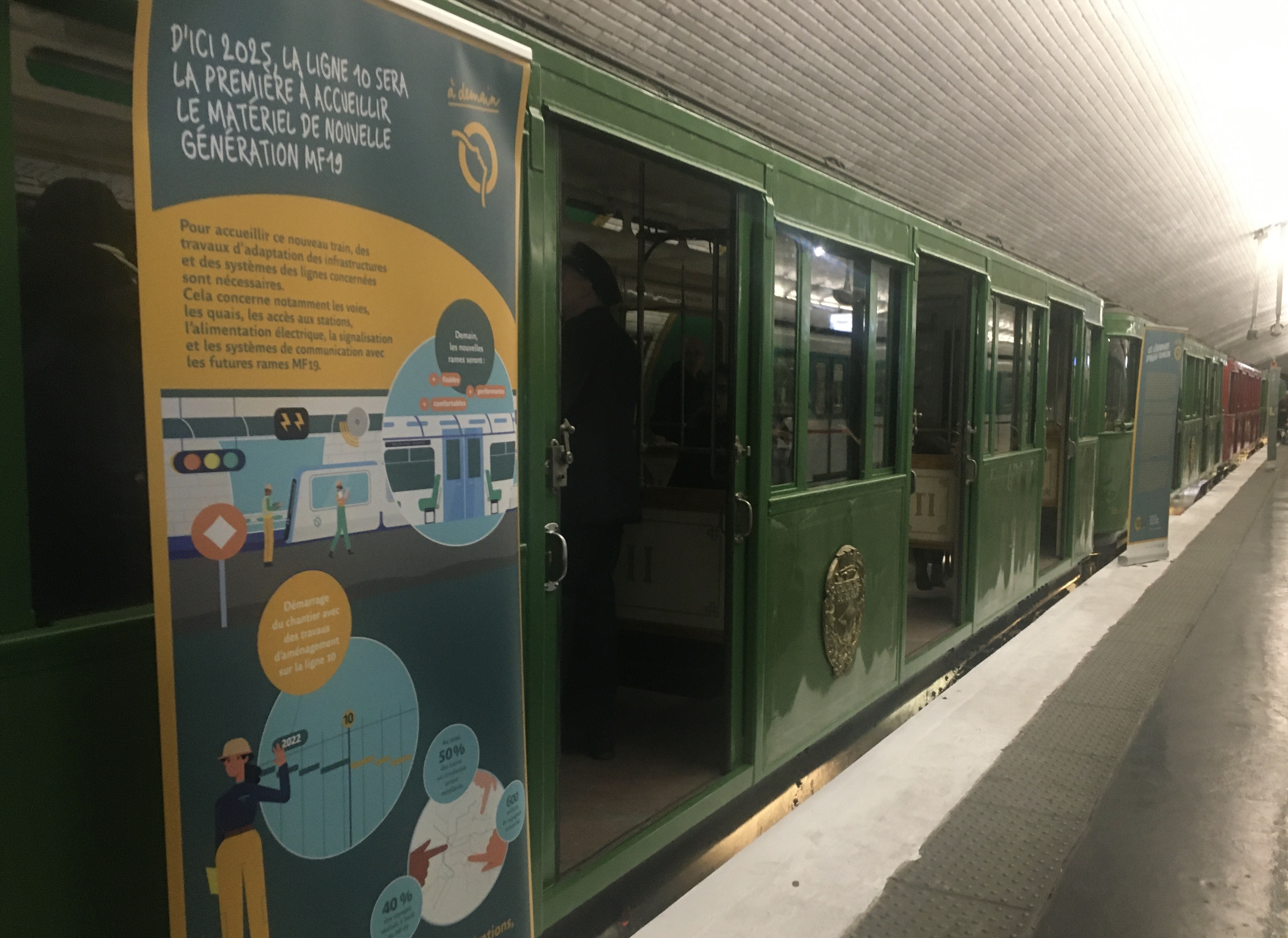
Sprague-Thomson at Porte d'Auteuil for the 100th birthday of Line 10 in 2023

MF 67 running the Boucle d'Auteuil
