= Orleans station =

Orleans station may refer to:

== Transportation ==
=== France ===
- Gare d'Orléans, a railway station in Orléans, Loiret department, France
- Gare des Aubrais-Orléans, a main-line railway station in Fleury-les-Aubrais, Loiret department, France
- Gare d'Austerlitz, a railway station in Paris, France originally named Gare d'Orléans
- Gare d'Orléans-Austerlitz, the former name of the Gare d'Austerlitz metro station in Paris, France
- Gare d'Orsay, a railway station in Paris, France originally named Gare d'Orléans (Quai d'Orsay)
- Gare de Rouen Orléans, a former railway station in Rouen, Normandy, France
- Porte d'Orléans station, a Paris Metro station in Paris, France

=== Canada ===
- Place d'Orléans station, a transitway station in of Ottawa, Ontario, Canada

=== United States ===
- Orleans station (Massachusetts), a former railroad station in Orleans, Massachusetts, United States
- New Orleans Union Passenger Terminal, an intermodal facility in New Orleans, Louisiana, United States
- New Orleans Union Station, a former railroad station in New Orleans, Louisiana, United States
- L&N Station (New Orleans), a former Louisville and Nashville Railroad station in New Orleans, Louisiana, United States
- Southern Railway Terminal (New Orleans), a former Southern Railway station in New Orleans, Louisiana, United States
- Southern Railway Freight Office (New Orleans, Louisiana), a former freight station in New Orleans, Louisiana, United States
- Texas Pacific - Missouri Pacific Station (New Orleans), a former Texas & Pacific Railway station in New Orleans, Louisiana, United States

== Military ==
- Naval Air Station Joint Reserve Base New Orleans, a Navy reserve base in Belle Chasse, Plaquemines Parish, Louisiana, United States
  - Coast Guard Air Station New Orleans, part of Naval Air Station Joint Reserve Base New Orleans
- Naval Support Activity New Orleans, the former name of U.S. Naval Station New Orleans, a Navy repair base in New Orleans, Louisiana, United States

== See also ==
- Gare d'Orléans (disambiguation)
- Orleans (disambiguation)
