= Boulogne–Jean Jaurès station =

Paris Métro station in Boulogne-Billancourt

Boulogne–Jean Jaurès
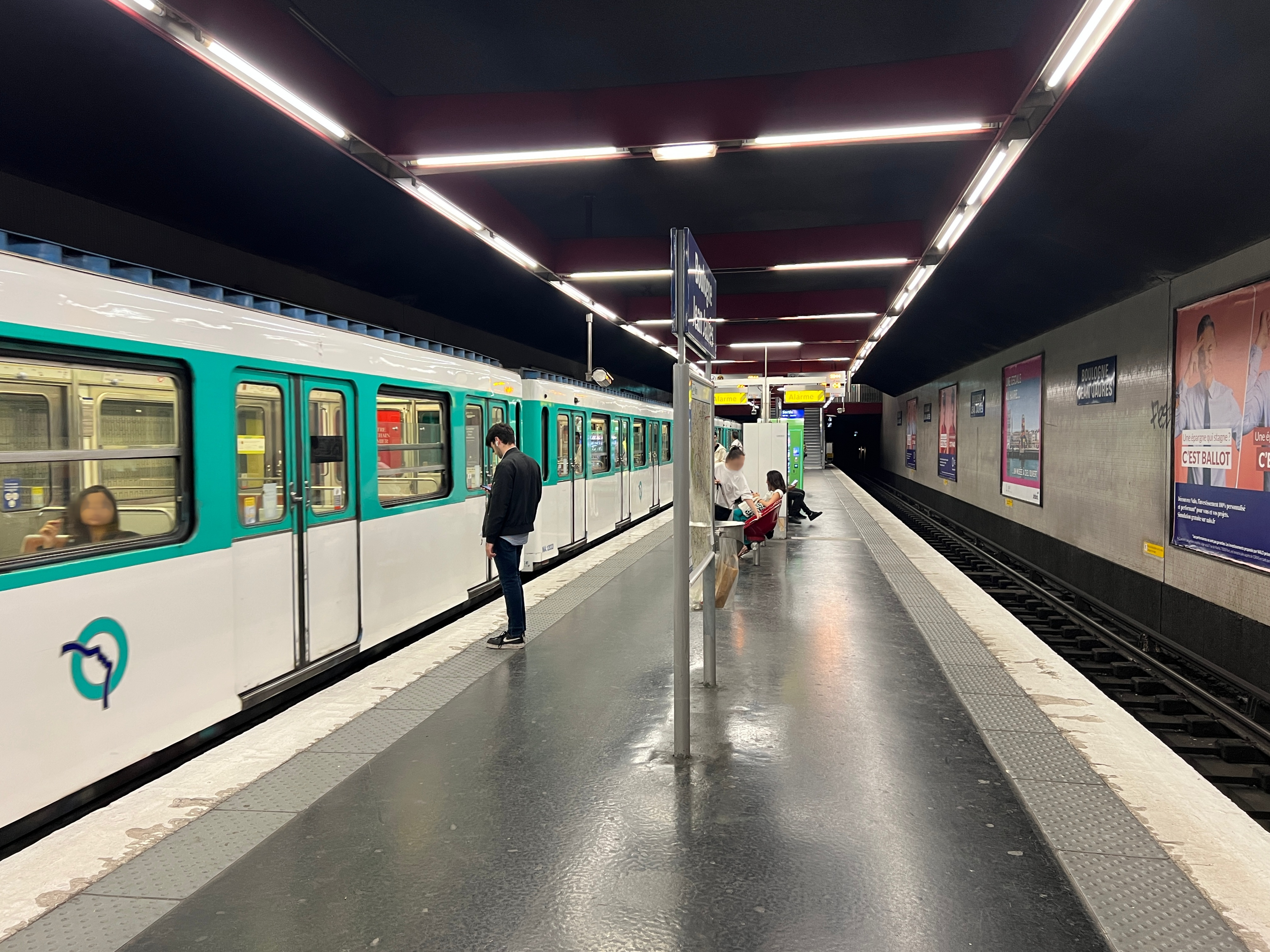
- MF 67 at Boulogne–Jean Jaurès

General information
- Location: Boulogne-Billancourt; Île-de-France; France
- Coordinates: 48°50′32″N 2°14′20″E
- System: Paris Métro station
- Owner: RATP
- Operator: RATP
- Line: Paris Metro Paris Metro Line 10
- Platforms: 1 (island platform)
- Tracks: 2

Other information
- Station code: 29-04
- Fare zone: 2

History
- Opened: 3 October 1980

Passengers
- 2,700,354 (2021)

Services
| Preceding station | Paris Metro | Following station |
|---|---|---|
| Boulogne–Pont de Saint-Cloud Terminus | Line 10 Westbound only | Porte d'Auteuil One-way operation |
| Boulogne–Pont de Saint-Cloud Terminus | Line 10 Eastbound only | Michel-Ange–Molitor towards Gare d'Austerlitz |
Location
- Location within Paris

Boulogne–Jean Jaurès (French: [bulɔɲ ʒɑ̃ ʒɔʁɛs]) is a station on Line 10 of the Paris Métro in the commune of Boulogne-Billancourt. It lies under Boulevard Jean-Jaurès, which was named after Jean Jaurès (1859–1914), a French Socialist politician, who was assassinated at the beginning of World War I. He is also honoured at Jaurès station, on Lines 2, 5 and 7.

East of this station, the line enters the 16th arrondissement of Paris and splits into separate eastbound and westbound sections until attaining the Rive Gauche and Javel–André Citroën station.

== History ==
The station opened on 3 October 1980 as part of the extension of line 10 from Porte d'Auteuil, the first phase of an extension that aimed to serve the northern districts of Boulogne. It served as its western terminus until its subsequent extension to Boulogne–Pont de Saint-Cloud on 2 October 1981.

In 2019, the station was used by 3,785,458 passengers, making it the 129th busiest of the Métro network out of 302 stations.

In 2020, the station was used by 2,016,202 passengers amidst the COVID-19 pandemic, making it the 121st busiest of the Métro network out of 305 stations.

In 2021, the station was used by 2,700,354 passengers, making it the 128th busiest of the Métro network out of 305 stations.

== Passenger services ==
=== Access ===
The station has 3 accesses:

- Access 1: Boulevard Jean Jaurès, rue du Château côté numéros impairs
- Access 2: Boulevard Jean Jaurès, rue du Château côté numéros pairs
- Access 3: rue du Château

=== Station layout ===
Street Level
| B1 | Mezzanine |
| Line 10 platforms | Westbound | ← toward Boulogne–Pont de Saint-Cloud (Terminus) |
| Line 10 platforms | Island platform, doors will open on the left |
| Line 10 platforms | Eastbound | toward Gare d'Austerlitz (Michel-Ange–Molitor) → (No service outbound: Porte d'Auteuil) |

=== Platforms ===
The station has a single island platform flanked by two tracks due to the narrowness of the street it is built under.

=== Other connections ===
The station is also served by lines 52 and 123 of the RATP bus network.

== Gallery ==
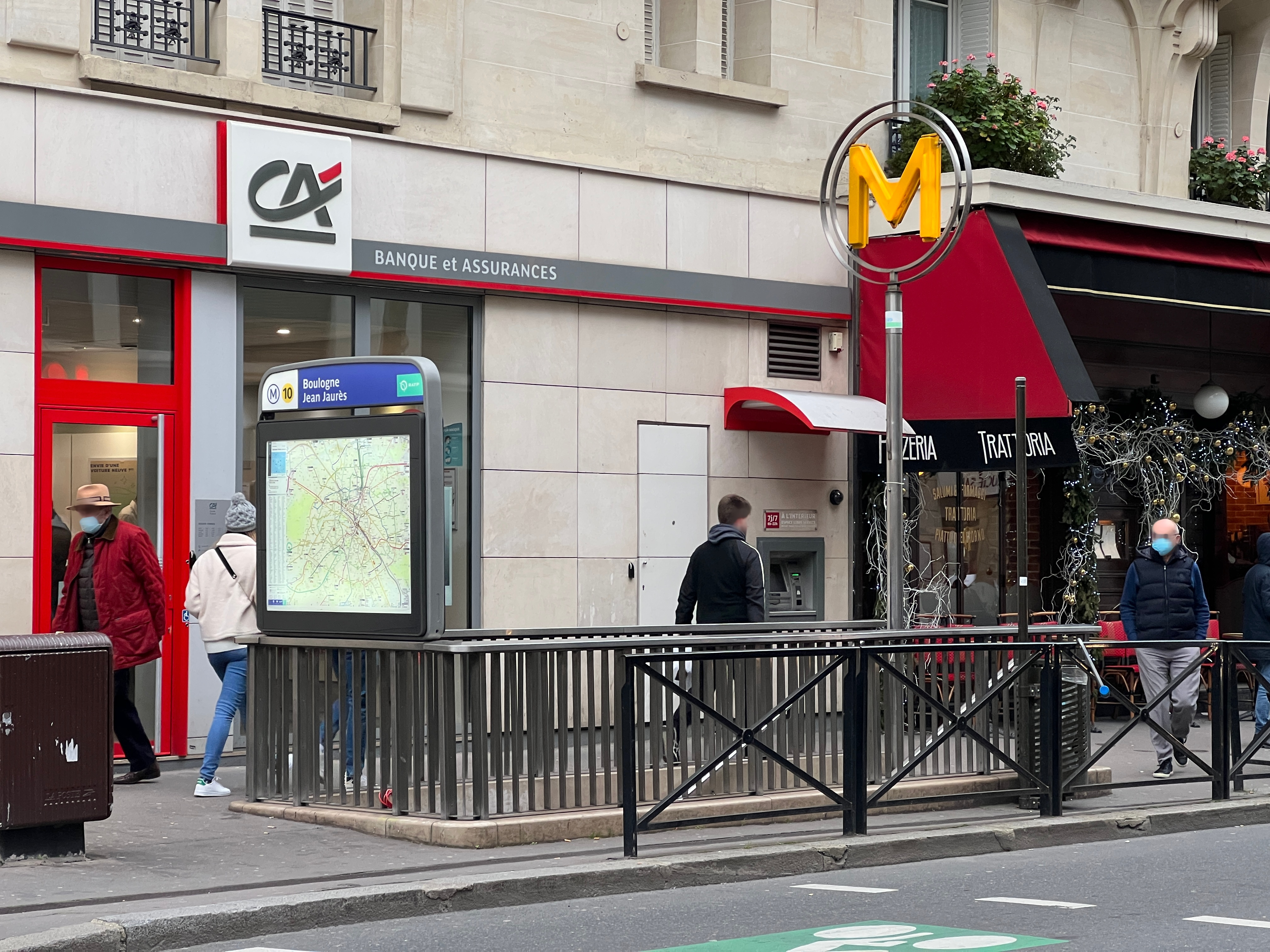
Access 1

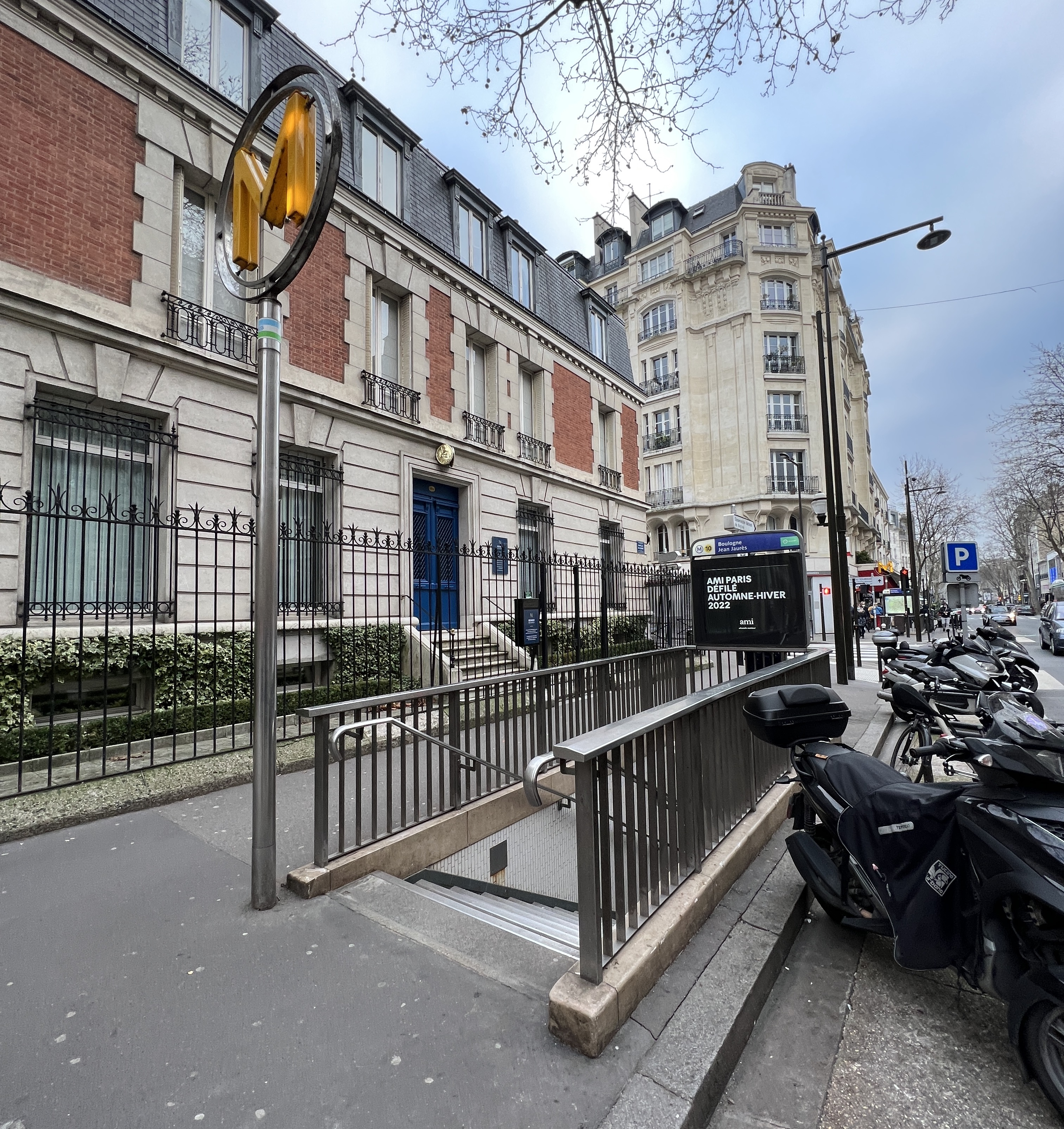
Access 2

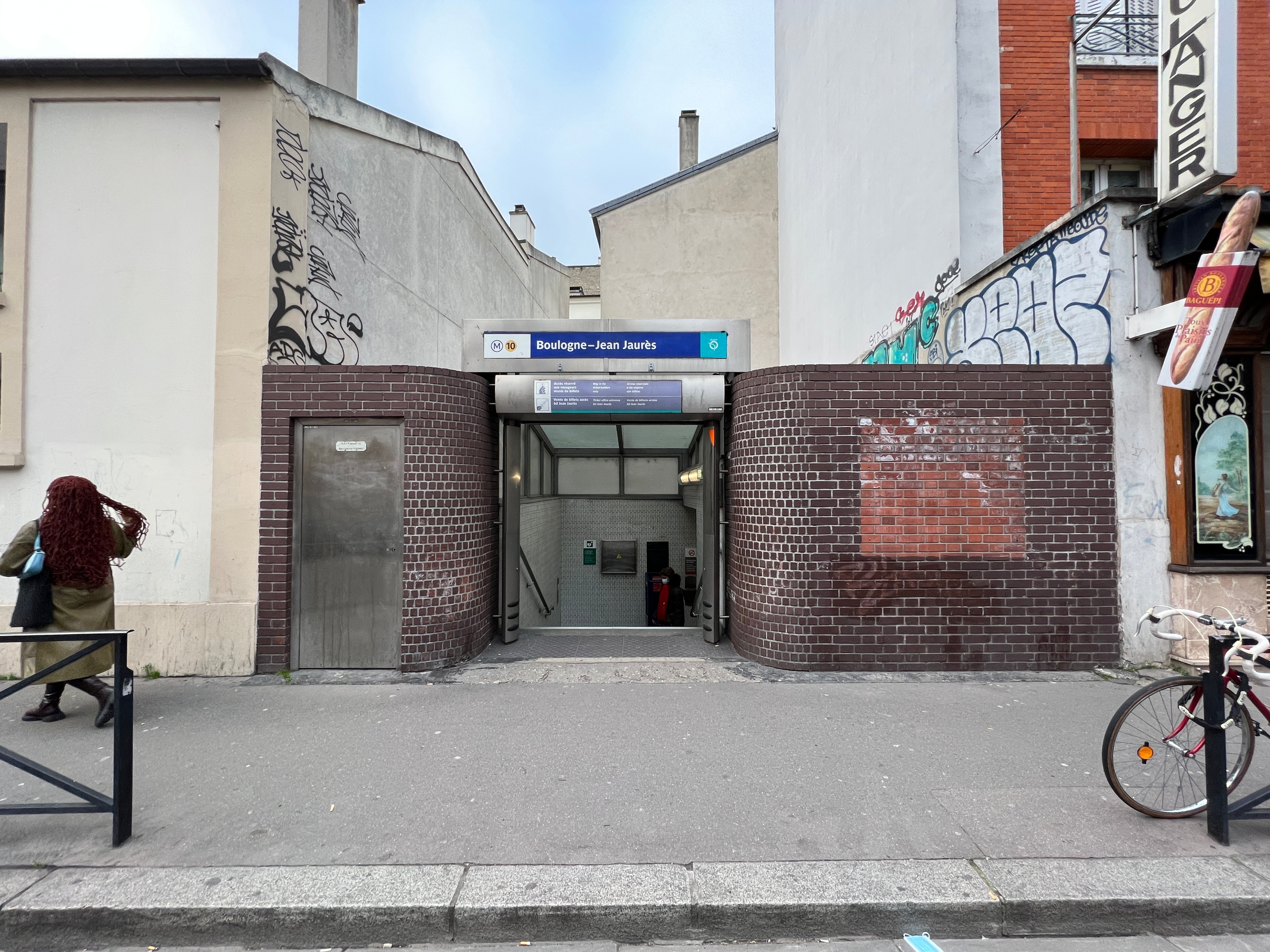
Access 3

== Nearby ==
- Bois de Boulogne
- Église Notre-Dame de Boulogne
