= Gare d'Orléans (disambiguation) =

Orléans station (French: Gare d'Orléans) is the main railway station of the city of Orléans in south-western France.

Gare d'Orléans may also refer to:

- Gare des Aubrais-Orléans, a mainline railway station in Fleury-les-Aubrais, Loiret department, France
- Gare d'Austerlitz, a railway station in Paris, France, opened in 1840 as Paris Gare d'Orléans
  - Gare d'Orléans-Austerlitz, the former name of the Gare d'Austerlitz metro station in Paris, France
- Gare d'Orsay, a former railway station in Paris, France, opened in 1900 as Gare d'Orléans (Quai d'Orsay)
- Rouen Orléans station, a former railway station in Rouen, Normandy, France

== See also ==
- Orleans station (disambiguation)
