= Porte Molitor station =

Unused metro station in Paris, France

Porte Molitor
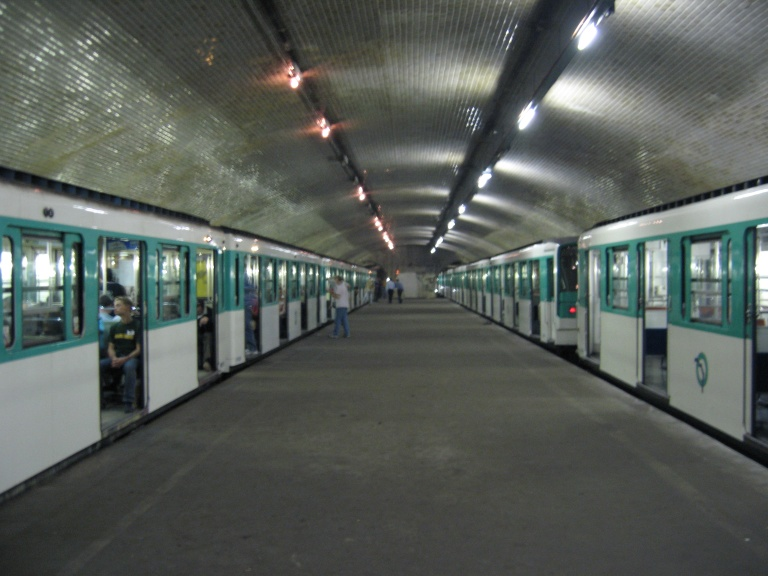

General information
- Location: no access 16th arrondissement of Paris; Île-de-France; France
- Coordinates: 48°50′35″N 2°15′23″E
- System: Paris Métro station
- Owner: RATP
- Operator: RATP

Other information
- Fare zone: N/A

History
- Opened: Never opened
Location
- Location within Paris

Porte Molitor (French pronunciation: [pɔʁt mɔlitɔʁ]), along with the station Haxo makes up a part of the Ghost stations of the Paris Métro that have never seen a single passenger. It is situated in the 16th arrondissement of Paris.

== The station ==
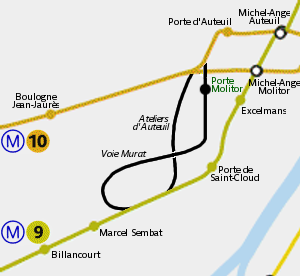
Porte Molitor's location on a route map.

The stations Porte de Saint-Cloud (Line 9) and Porte d'Auteuil (Line 10 westbound) are linked both by the service depots of Auteuil and a single platform situated under the boulevard Murat. A station with a central platform is found here and is called Murat or Porte Molitor.

This station was originally intended to service the Parc des Princes stadium on matchdays. However, access to the station was never constructed and the station today serves as storage sidings for trains.

The station's tracks merge into a single track at both ends of the station, so the station would have been served in only one direction (southbound) had it been opened.

== Station layout ==
Street Level (no entrance)

Line 9 platforms	Southbound	No regular service (Porte de Saint-Cloud northbound is the next stop) (No service from northbound: Porte d'Auteuil)
Line 9 platforms	Island platform, not in service
Line 9 platforms	Southbound	No regular service (Porte de Saint-Cloud northbound is the next stop) (No service from northbound: Porte d'Auteuil)

== See also ==
- Haxo, a never-opened station on the Paris Metro
- North End tube station, never-opened station on the London Underground
- Kymlinge, a never-opened station on the Stockholm Metro
- Unused stations on the Helsinki Metro
