= Charles Michels station =

Metro station in Paris, France

Charles Michels
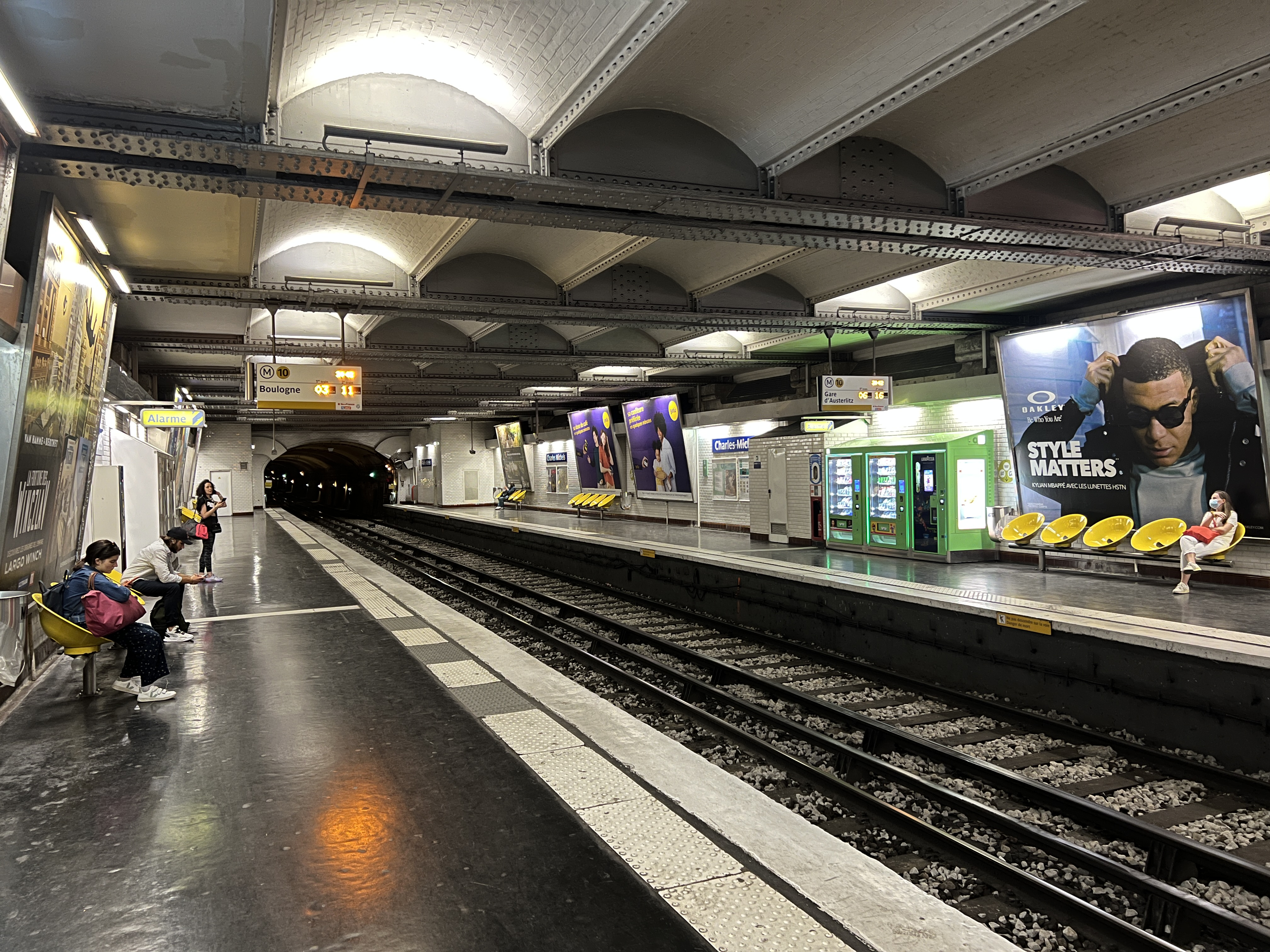
- Platforms

General information
- Location: 15th arrondissement of Paris; Île-de-France; France
- Coordinates: 48°50′48″N 2°17′13″E
- System: Paris Métro station
- Owner: RATP
- Operator: RATP
- Line: Paris Metro Paris Metro Line 10
- Platforms: 2 (2 side platforms)
- Tracks: 2

Construction
- Accessible: No

Other information
- Fare zone: 1

History
- Opened: 13 July 1913
- Former names: Beaugrenelle (13 July 1913 – 13 July 1945)

Passengers
- 3,079,569 (2021)

Services
Preceding station	Paris Metro	Following station
Javel–André Citroën towards Boulogne–Pont de Saint-Cloud	Line 10	Avenue Émile Zola towards Gare d'Austerlitz
Location
- Location within Paris

Charles Michels (French pronunciation: [ʃaʁl(ə) miʃɛl]) is a station on Line 10 of the Paris Métro. It is located in the 15th arrondissement.

== History ==
The station opened as Beaugrenelle on 13 July 1913 as part of the initial section of line 8 as its temporary southern terminus, and with Opéra as its northern terminus. The line was then extended to Porte d'Auteuil on 30 September that same year, becoming its new southern terminus. It was then named after Place Beaugrenelle (now known as Place Charles Michels). Beaugrenelle ("beautiful Grenelle") was a name given by property developers in the Grenelle district during its urbanisation.

On 27 July 1937, the section of line 8 between La Motte-Picquet–Grenelle and Porte d'Auteuil, including Beaugrenelle, was transferred to line 10 during the reconfiguration of lines 8, 10, and the old line 14. On 29 July 1937, line 10 was extended from Duroc to La Motte-Picquet–Grenelle.

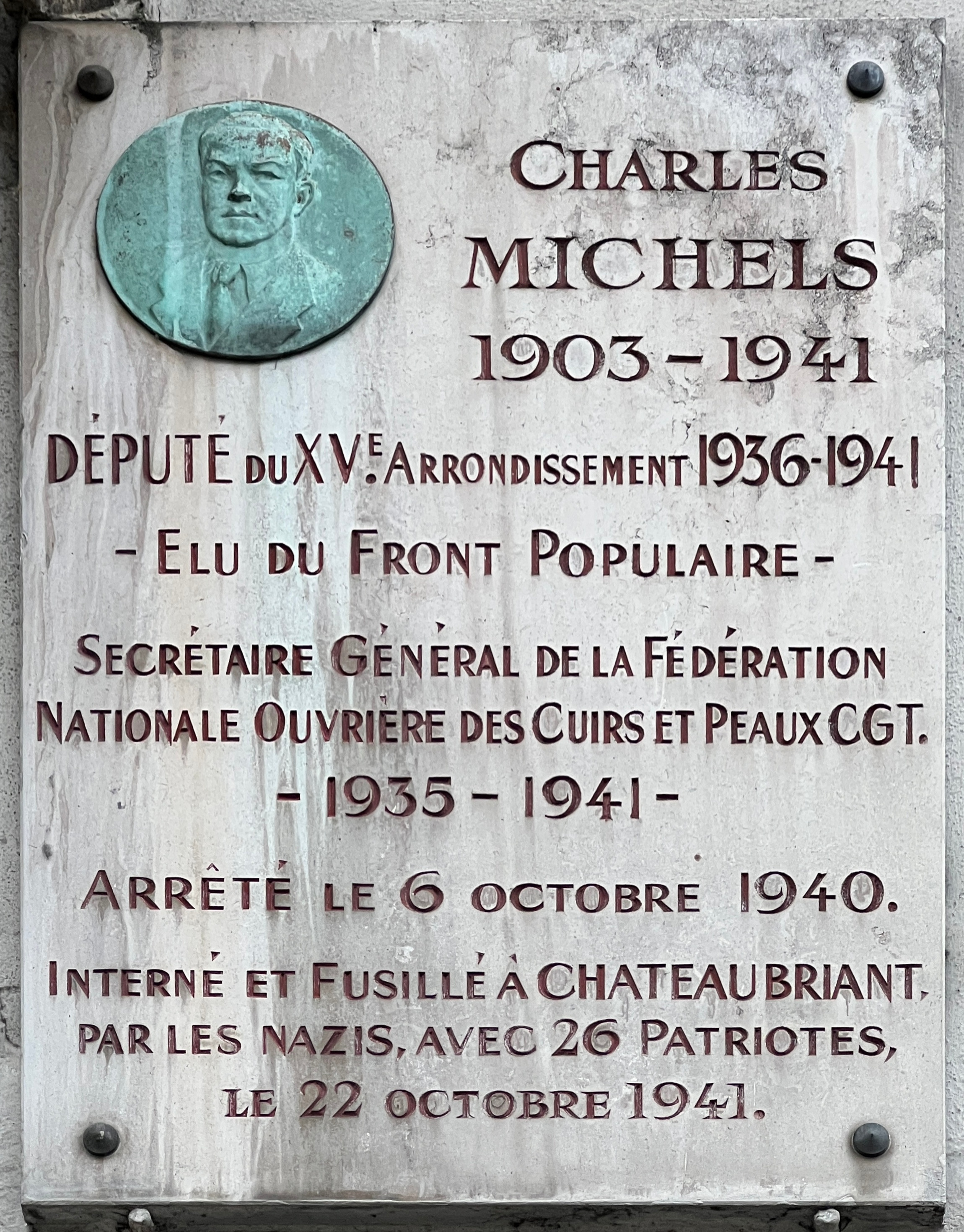
Plaque honouring Charles Michels

On 14 July 1945, both the station as well as the nearby Place Beaugrenelle were renamed Charles Michels and Place Charles Michels respectively, in honour of Charles Michels (1903–1941), a trade unionist, communist militant, and deputy of the 15th arrondissement in Paris. He was held hostage and shot during the Occupation by the Nazis in retaliation for the assassination of Karl Hotz, amongst 44 other people. Hence, the station, along with 7 other stations, were renamed after the Second World War to honour the resistance fighters who had died for France. The other stations were: Colonel Fabien, Corentin Cariou, Corentin Celton, Guy Môquet, Jacques Bonsergent, Marx Dormoy, and Trinité - d'Estienne d'Orves.

As part of the "Renouveau du métro" programme by the RATP, the station's platforms were renovated and modernised in 2009.

In 2019, the station was used by 4,601,730 passengers, making it the 93rd busiest of the Métro network out of 302 stations.

In 2020, the station was used by 2,198,392 passengers amidst the COVID-19 pandemic, making it the 194th busiest of the Métro network out of 108 stations.

In 2021, the station was used by 3,079,569 passengers, making it the 102nd busiest of the Métro network out of 305 stations.

== Passenger services ==
=== Access ===
The station has 2 accesses:

- Access 1: Place Charles-Michels
- Access 2: rue des Entrepreneurs

=== Station layout ===
Street Level
B1	Mezzanine
Platform level	Side platform, doors will open on the right
Platform level	Westbound	← toward Boulogne – Pont de Saint-Cloud (Javel–André Citroën)
Platform level	Eastbound	toward Gare d'Austerlitz (Avenue Émile Zola) →
Platform level	Side platform, doors will open on the right

=== Platforms ===
The station has a standard configuration with 2 tracks surrounded by 2 side platforms.

=== Other connections ===
The station is also served by lines 42, 70, and 88 of the RATP bus network, and at night, by lines N12 and N61 bus of the Noctilien network.

== Nearby ==
- A replica of the Statue of Liberty on the Île aux Cygnes.
- Beaugrenelle shopping mall
- Front de Seine
- square Pau-Casals

== Gallery ==
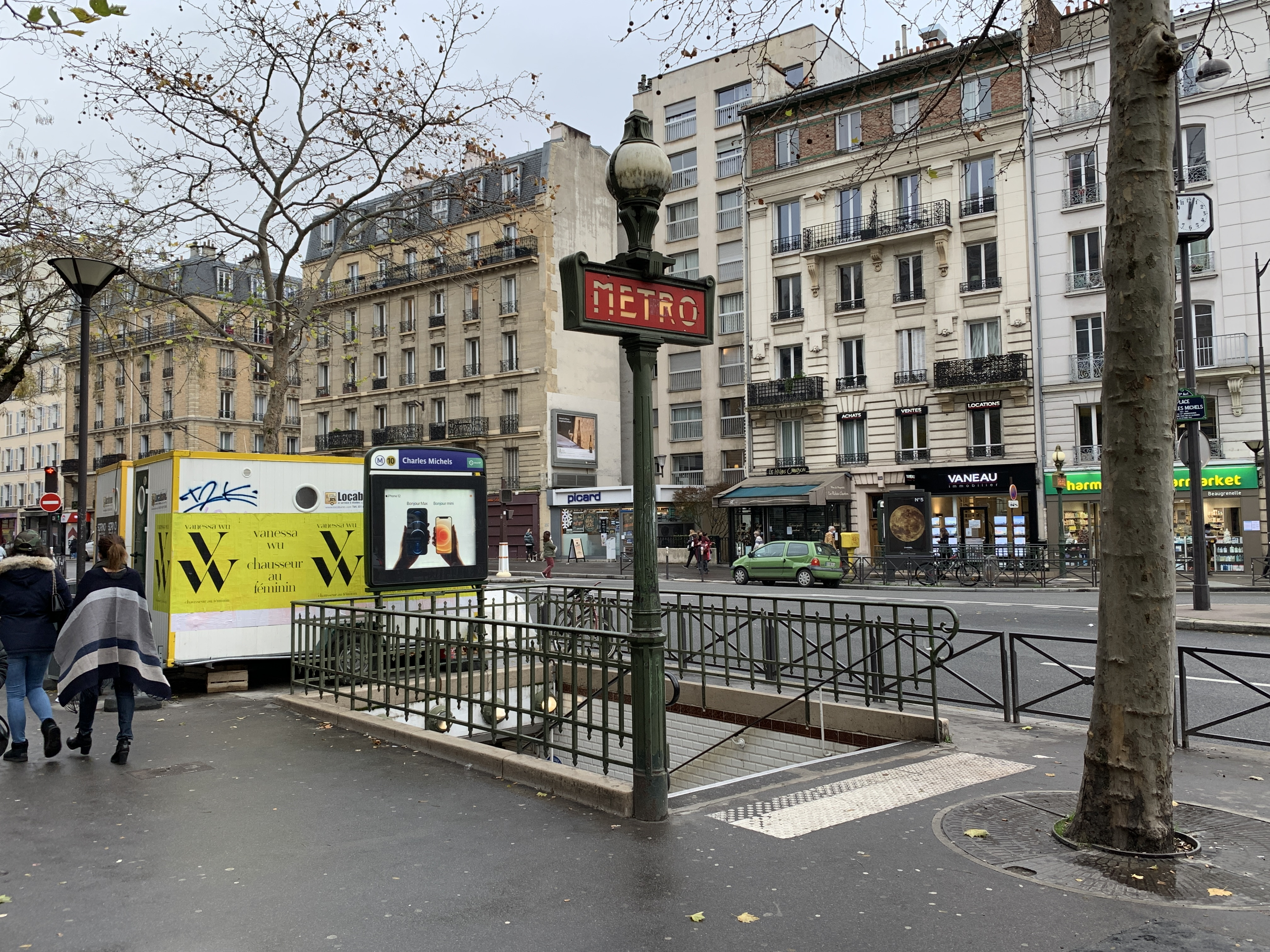
Access 1

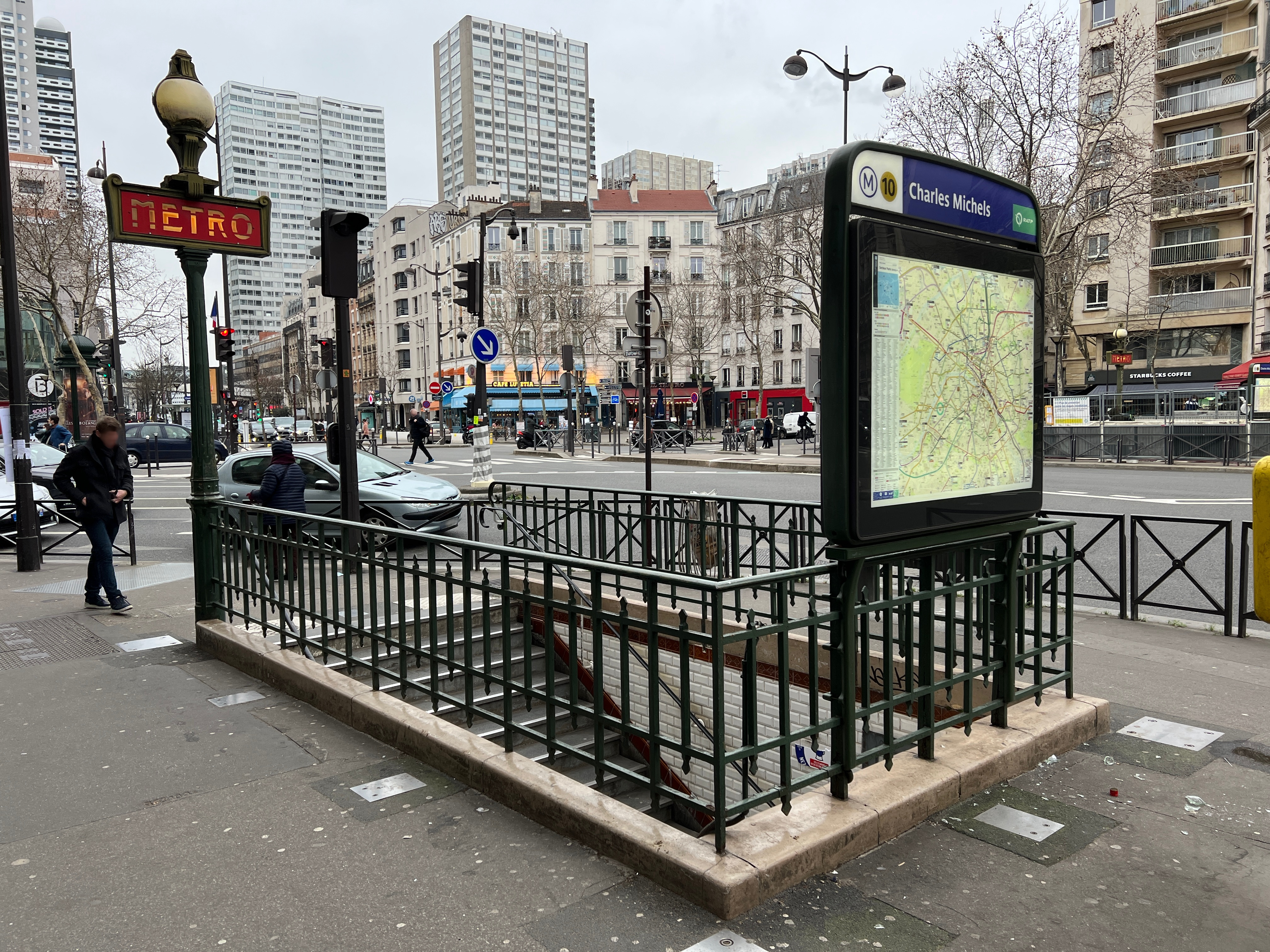
Access 2
