= Orlean =

Orlean may refer to:

- Orlean, Virginia, a village in Fauquier County, Virginia, United States
- Orlean, Altai Krai, a locality in Altai Krai, Russia
- Orlean (film), a 2015 Russian film
- Susan Orlean, American author and journalist
- Bixa orellana, the achiote or orlean tree

== See also ==
- Orleans (disambiguation)
