= Orleans Township =

Orleans Township may refer to:

- Orleans Township, Orange County, Indiana
- Orleans Township, Winneshiek County, Iowa, in Winneshiek County, Iowa
- Orleans Township, Michigan
- Orleans Township, Harlan County, Nebraska
