= Orleans, Missouri =

Ghost town in Missouri, United States

Orleans
- Ghost town
- Location within the state of Missouri
- Coordinates: 37.5222632°N 93.5190896°W
- Country: United States
- State: Missouri
- County: Polk
- Established: 1846 (post office)
- Named for: New Orleans
- Time zone: UTC−6 (Central (CST))
  - Summer (DST): UTC−5 (CDT)
- GNIS feature ID: 755611

Orleans is an extinct town in Polk County, in the U.S. state of Missouri.

A post office called Orleans was established in 1846, and remained in operation until 1895. The community's name is a transfer from New Orleans.
