= Boulogne–Pont de Saint-Cloud station =

Paris Métro station in Boulogne-Billancourt

Boulogne–Pont de Saint-Cloud
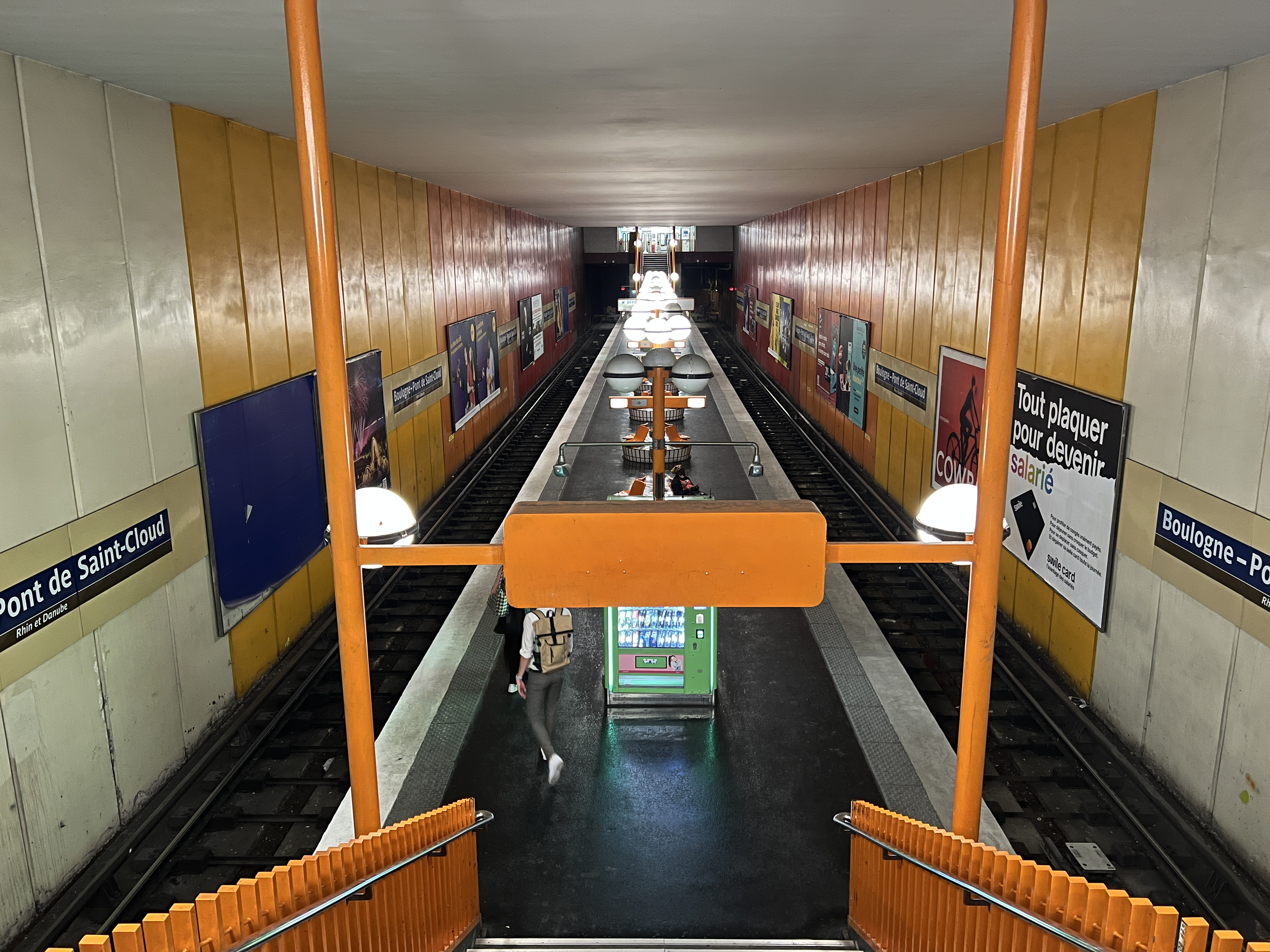

General information
- Location: Boulogne-Billancourt; Île-de-France; France
- Coordinates: 48°50′26″N 2°13′42″E
- System: Paris Métro station
- Owner: RATP
- Operator: RATP

Other information
- Fare zone: 2

History
- Opened: 2 October 1981

Services
Preceding station	Paris Metro	Following station
Terminus	Line 10	Boulogne–Jean Jaurès towards Gare d'Austerlitz
Preceding station	Tram	Following station
Les Milons towards Pont de Bezons	T2	Musée de Sèvres towards Porte de Versailles
Location
- Location within Paris

Boulogne–Pont de Saint-Cloud (French pronunciation: [bulɔɲ pɔ̃ d(ə) sɛ̃ klu]) is the western terminus of Line 10 of the Paris Métro. The station lies under the Rond-Point Rhin et Danube, east of the Pont de Saint-Cloud over the Seine, in the suburban commune of Boulogne-Billancourt. The station opened on 2 October 1981 when Line 10 was extended from Boulogne–Jean Jaurès. The station is the most westerly station on Paris Métro system.

== Passenger services ==
=== Access ===
The station has four accesses divided into six Métro entrances:

- access 1 - Route de la Reine, consisting of a fixed staircase decorated with a mast with a yellow "M" inscribed in a circle, leading to the odd sidewalk of this road, at the corner with Avenue André-Morizet;
- access 2 - Avenue Jean-Baptiste-Clément, also consisting of a fixed staircase, located at the end of this avenue to the right of no. 1 of the Rhin et Danube roundabout;
- access 3 - Rue du Port - Musée Albert-Kahn, consisting of two fixed stairs established back-to-back on the even sidewalk of the Avenue du Maréchal-de-Lattre-de-Tassigny, one with a yellow "M" mast facing no. 6, the other located to the right of no. 2;
- access 4 - Avenue du Maréchal-de-Lattre-de-Tassigny, consisting of two exits also arranged back-to-back on the odd sidewalk of the avenue, one consisting of a fixed staircase equipped with a yellow "M" totem pole facing no. 7, the other leading to the right of no. 21 of the Rhin et Danube roundabout; a rare case in the Paris Métro, this last exit consists of a gently sloping ramp instead of a staircase as is customary on the network, a feature that is also found at Fort d'Aubervilliers station on Line 7.

In the ticket area is a ceramic fresco, geographically depicting the period of reconquest during the Second World War from 1943 to 1945.

=== Station layout ===
Street Level

B1	Mezzanine

Platform level	Eastbound	toward Gare d'Austerlitz (Boulogne–Jean Jaurès) →
Platform level	Island platform, doors will open on the left, right
Platform level	Eastbound	toward Gare d'Austerlitz (Boulogne–Jean Jaurès) →

=== Platforms ===
Boulogne–Pont de Saint-Cloud is a station with a particular configuration. It has a central platform framed by the two tracks of the Métro. Its shape and decoration are typical of the 1980s. The vertical walls are painted in a colour gradient ranging from off-white on the east side, through orange to burgundy on the west side, and support a horizontal ceiling painted white. The advertising frames are metallic, and the name of the station is inscribed in Parisine font on enamelled plates.

The Motte style seats are orange on circular benches treated in flat white tiles, which are surmounted by orange poles each comprising three globes for lighting and are of the same model as those illuminating the platforms of the Bobigny–Pablo Picasso station on Line 5 as well as those of Le Kremlin-Bicêtre, Villejuif–Paul Vaillant-Couturier and Villejuif–Louis Aragon stations on Line 7.

The station is devoid of a rear station due to the lack of space due to its proximity to the Seine, so the manoeuvres are executed in front of the station. The trains are thus received alternately on the two tracks and leave directly by turning back. For the same reason, the station has no train garage.

=== Other connections ===
The station offers a transfer with Île-de-France tramway Line 2 at Parc de Saint-Cloud station, located in the commune of Saint-Cloud on the other side of the Pont de Saint-Cloud.

In addition, it is served by lines 52, 72, 126, 160, 175, 260 and 467 of the RATP Bus Network, by line 460 of the Réseau de bus du Grand Versailles bus network and by line 17 of the Hourtoule transport company.

== Nearby ==
Just north of the station on the Rue du Port is the Musée Albert-Kahn, which houses The Archives of the Planet collection, as well as comprises four hectares of renowned gardens. Across the Pont de Saint-Cloud is the entrance to the Parc de Saint-Cloud through the Avenue de la Grille-d'Honneur towards the Terrasse du Château.

== Gallery ==
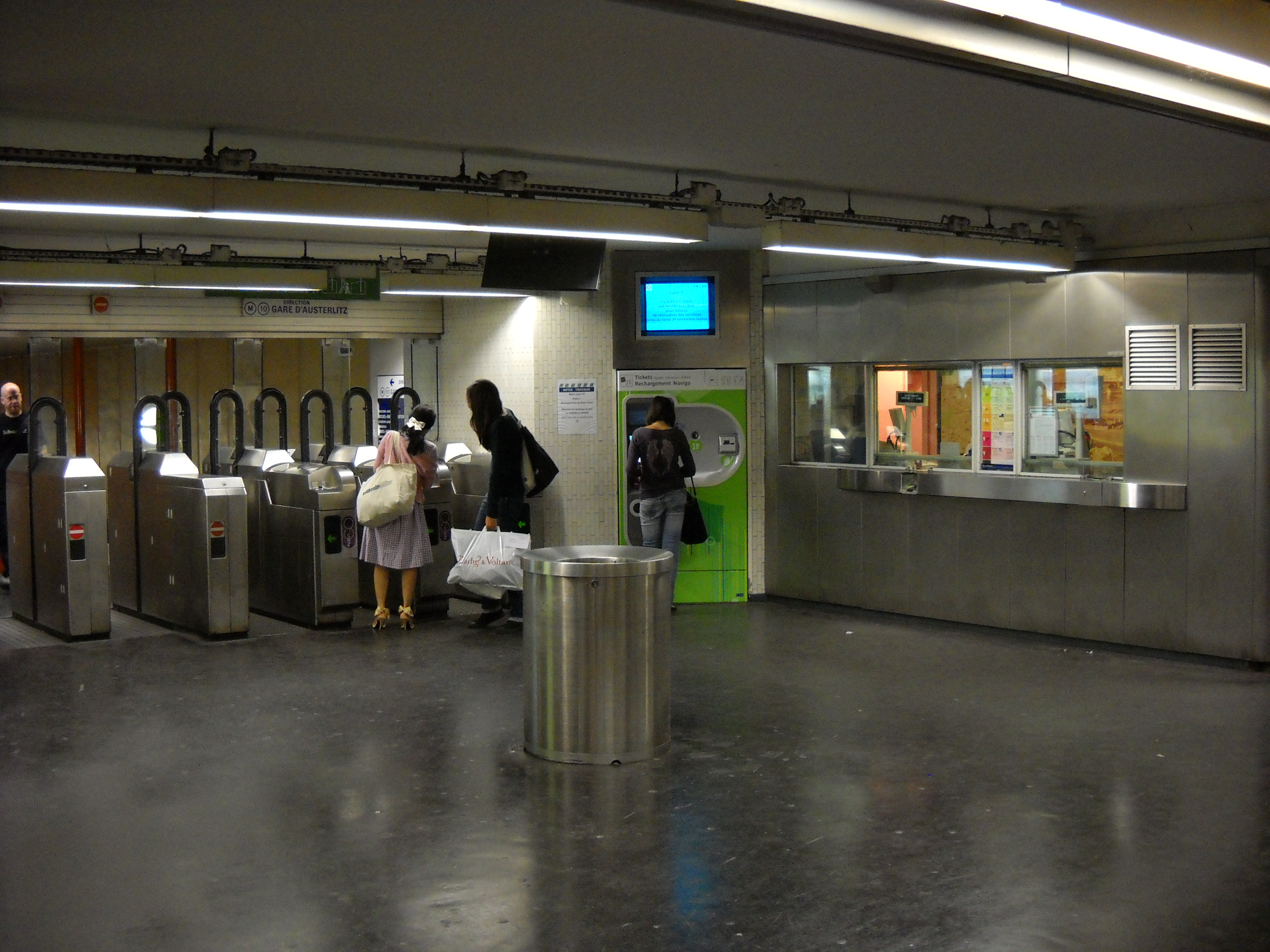
Boulogne–Pont de Saint-Cloud ticket hall

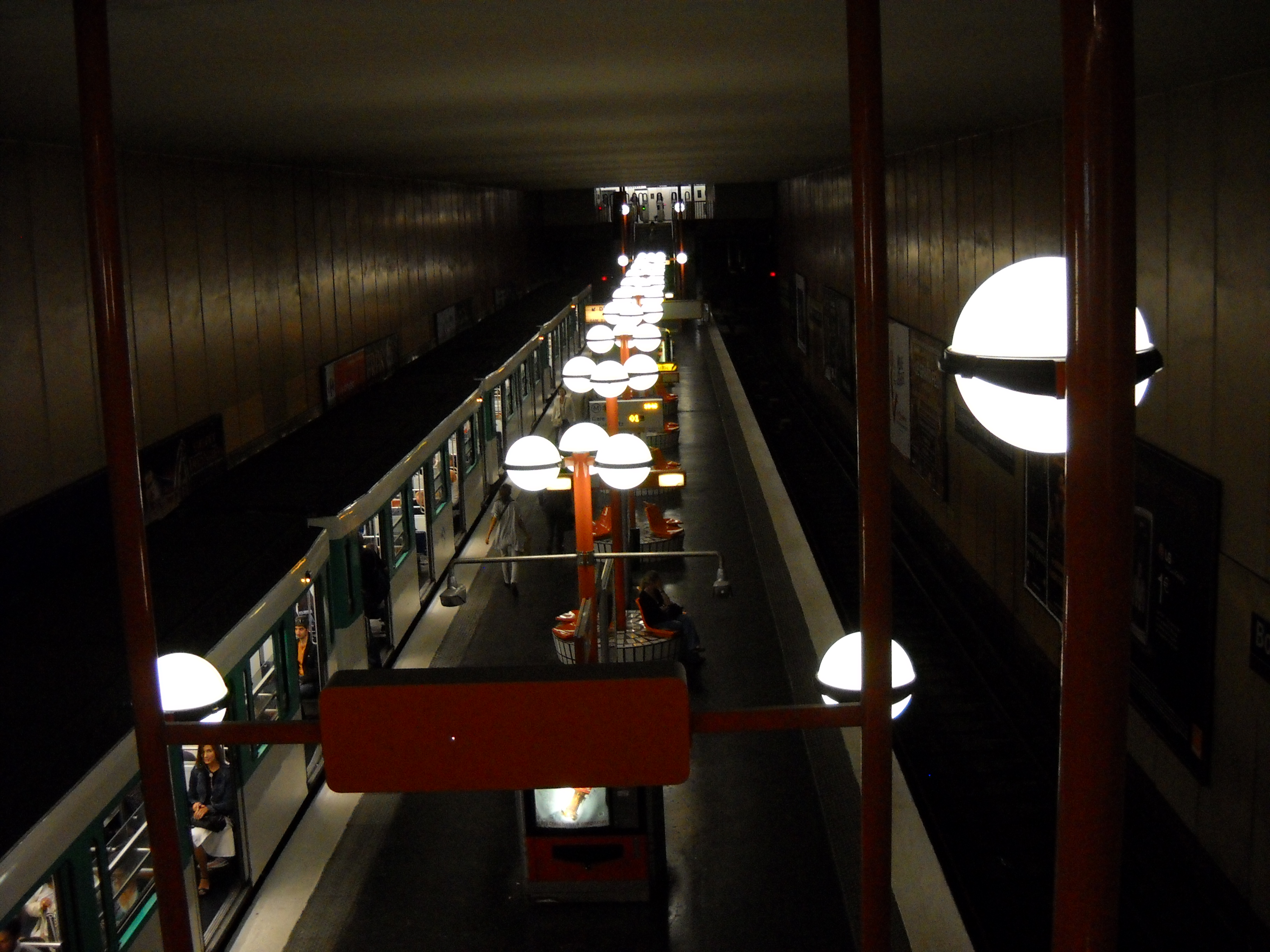
Line 10 platforms at Boulogne–Pont de Saint-Cloud
