= Gare d'Austerlitz (Paris Metro) =

Paris Métro station

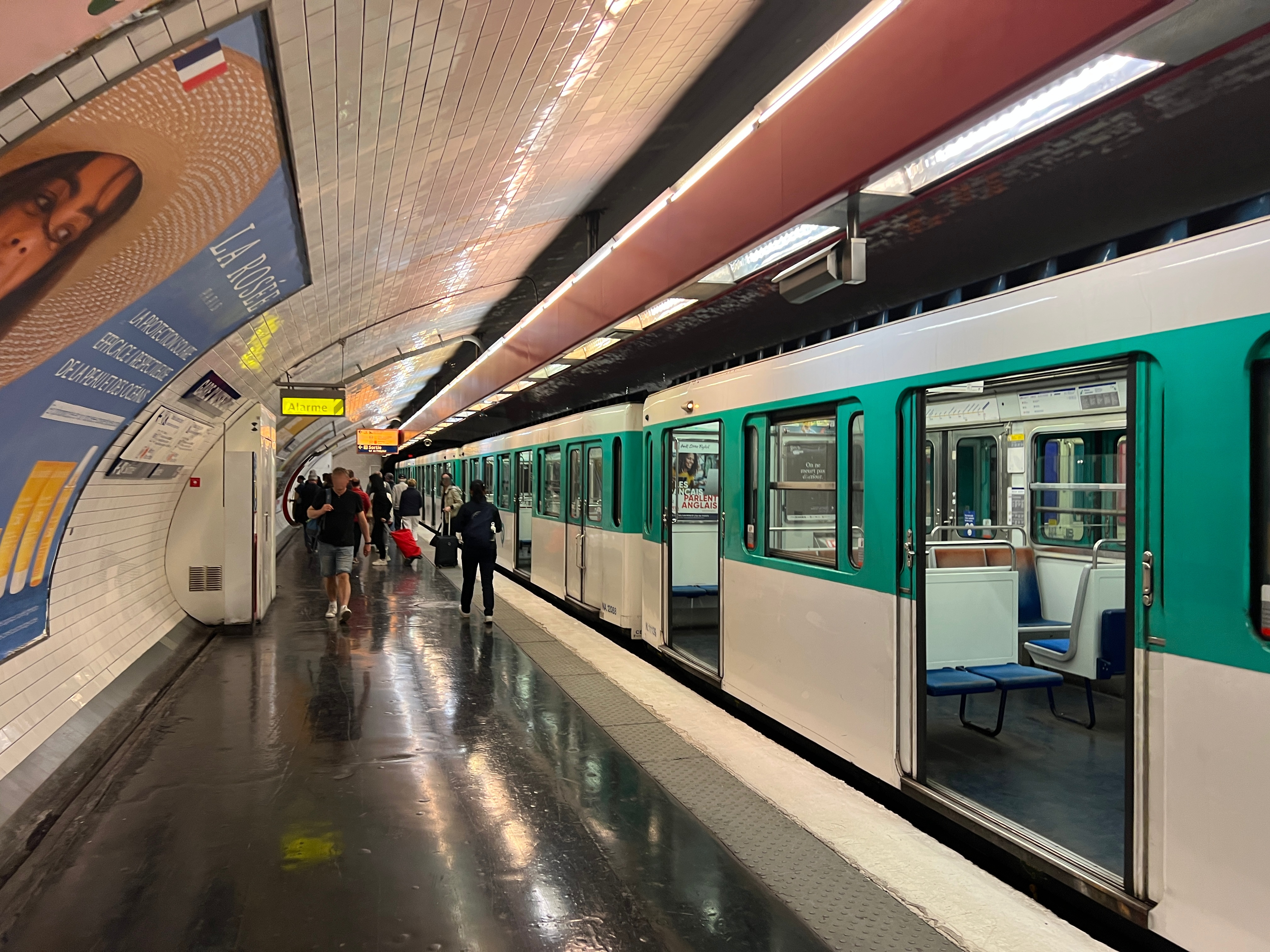
- Line 10 platforms

General information
- Location: 3, boul. de l'Hôpital; 6, boul. de l'Hôpital; 8, boul. de l'Hôpital; Gare d'Austerlitz (three); 13th arrondissement of Paris; Île-de-France; France
- Coordinates: 48°50′33″N 2°21′54″E
- Owner: RATP
- Operator: RATP
- Platforms: 4
- Tracks: 4
- Bus routes: : 24, 57, 61, 63, 89, 91, 215; : N01, N02, N31, N131, N133
- Bus operators: RATP, Noctilien
- Connections: : RER C (Paris-Austerlitz)

Other information
- Station code: 0907
- Fare zone: 1

History
- Opened: 2 June 1906
- Former names: Gare d'Orléans

Services
Preceding station	Paris Metro	Following station
Saint-Marcel towards Place d'Italie	Line 5	Quai de la Rapée towards Bobigny–Pablo Picasso
Jussieu towards Boulogne–Pont de Saint-Cloud	Line 10	Terminus
Connections to other stations
Preceding station	RER	Following station
Saint-Michel–Notre-Dame towards Pontoise, Versailles Château Rive Gauche or Saint-Quentin-en-Yvelines	RER C transfer at Gare d'Austerlitz	Bibliothèque François Mitterrand towards Massy-Palaiseau, Dourdan-la-Forêt or Saint-Martin-d'Étampes
Location
- Location within Paris

Gare d'Austerlitz (French pronunciation: [ɡaʁ dostɛʁlits]) is a station on the Paris Métro, serving Line 5 and forming the eastern terminus of Line 10. The Line 5 station hall, "probably the most atypical of the Paris Métro", is open to the exterior as the rails pass though under the roof of the mainline Gare d'Austerlitz, and forms part of a sinuous elevated section which has been "considered an exceptional work of urban railway insertion".

== History ==
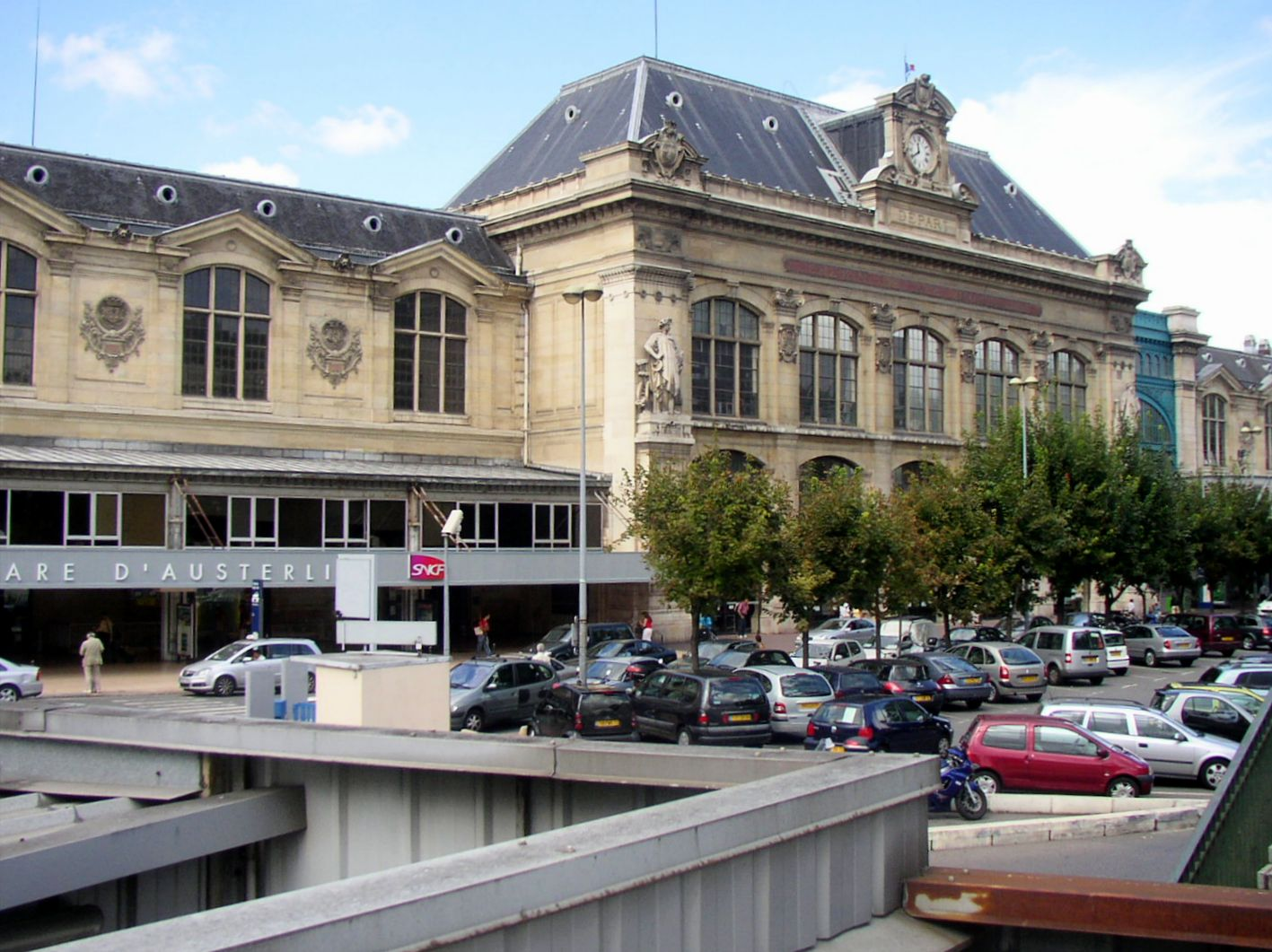
Gare d'Austerlitz

The station was opened on 2 June 1906 with the opening of the original section of line 5 between it and Place d'Italie. It was the northern terminus of the line until it was extended to Quai de la Rapée (then called Place Mazas) on 14 July 1906. The line 10 platforms opened on 12 July 1939 when the line was extended from Jussieu.

The metro station was originally named Gare d'Orléans after the Paris terminal of the Orleans Railway which was its reason for being. After the Railway opened in 1900 a new central Paris terminal, the Gare d’Orsay, the original terminal came over time to be called Austerlitz, after the nearby traffic bridge over the Seine, itself named after the 1805 Battle of Austerlitz. Reflecting the evolving popular name for the railway station, the metro station was renamed Gare d'Orléans-Austerlitz on 15 October 1930 and Gare d’Austerlitz on 25 April 1985.^{: 109} The district (quartier) around the station also came to be known as Austerlitz, but its name remains officially Salpêtrière.

== Passenger services ==
=== Access ===
The station has several entrances:

- Arrivals and departures Grandes Lignes: escalators and stairs in the station, by RER C
- Boulevard de l'Hôpital, Rue Buffon side: a staircase at 2 Boulevard de l'Hôpital
- Boulevard de l'Hôpital, Rue Nicolas-Houël side: a staircase at 6 Boulevard de l'Hôpital
- Boulevard de l'Hôpital, odd side SNCF Austerlitz station: a stairway Boulevard de l'Hôpital in front of the station entrance
- Departure court Grandes Lignes: a staircase
- SNCF Departure Grandes Lignes Quai d'Austerlitz: a staircase
- SNCF Arrivals Grandes Lignes: escalators and stairs in the station, by the RER C

=== Station layout ===
Line 5 platforms	Side platform, doors will open on the right
Line 5 platforms	Southbound	← toward Place d'Italie (Saint-Marcel)
Line 5 platforms	Northbound	toward Bobigny – Pablo Picasso (Quai de la Rapée) →
Line 5 platforms	Side platform, doors will open on the right

B1	Mezzanine for line 5 platform connection

Street Level

B1	Mezzanine for line 10 platform connection

Line 10 platforms	Side platform, doors will open on the right
Line 10 platforms	Westbound	← toward Boulogne – Pont de Saint-Cloud (Jussieu)
Line 10 platforms	Eastbound	Alighting passengers only →
Line 10 platforms	Side platform, doors will open on the right

=== Bus and other connections ===
The station is served by Lines 24, 57, 61, 63, 89, 91 and 215 of the RATP Bus Network. It is also served by the OpenTour tourist line. In addition, it is served at night by Lines N01, N02, N31, N131 and N133 of the Noctilien bus network. The line offered a connection with the Voguéo river line between 2008 and 2011. The station also offers a connection with Line C of the RER. SNCF trains head towards the southwest of France.

== Gallery ==
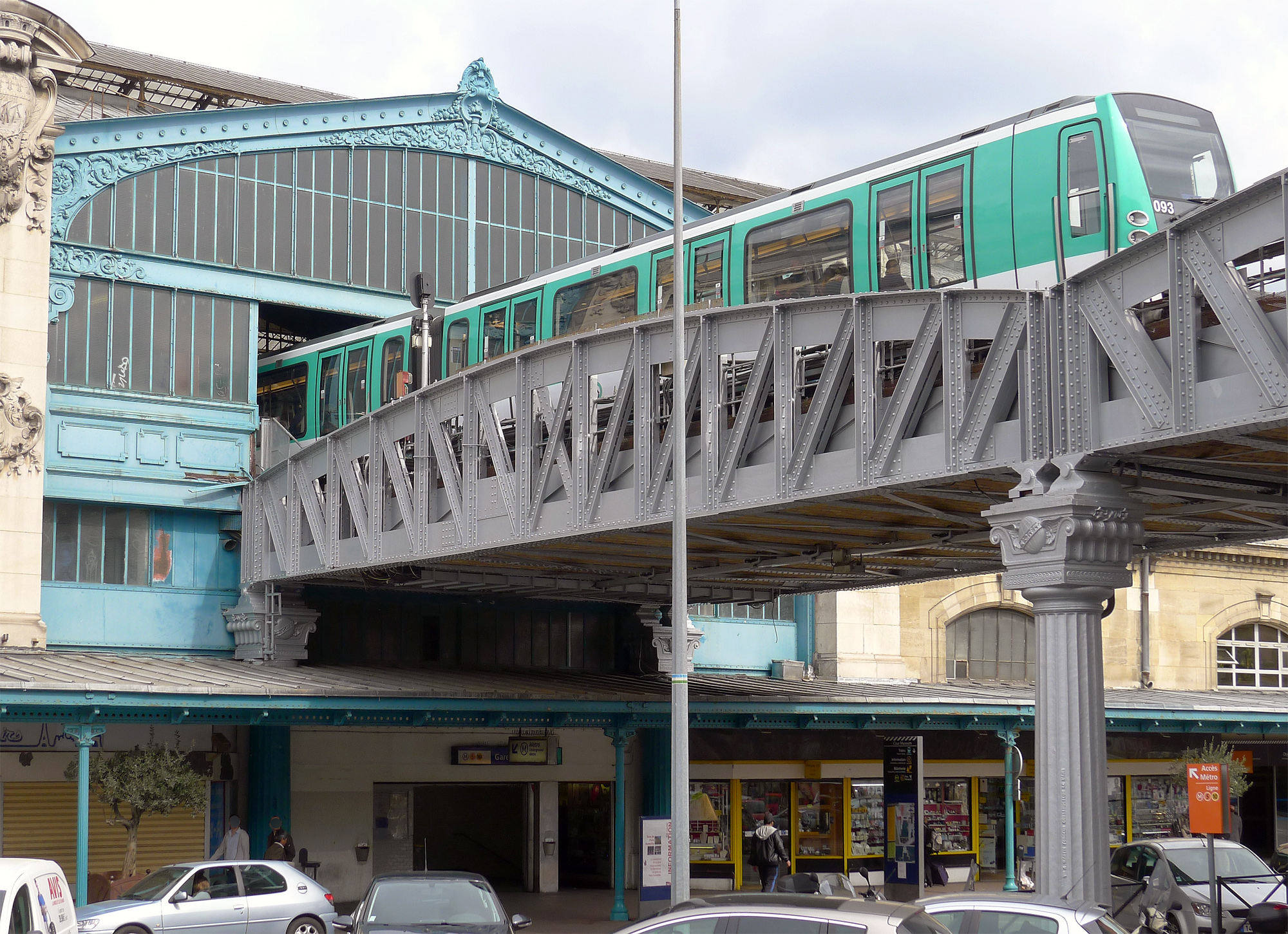
Line 5.

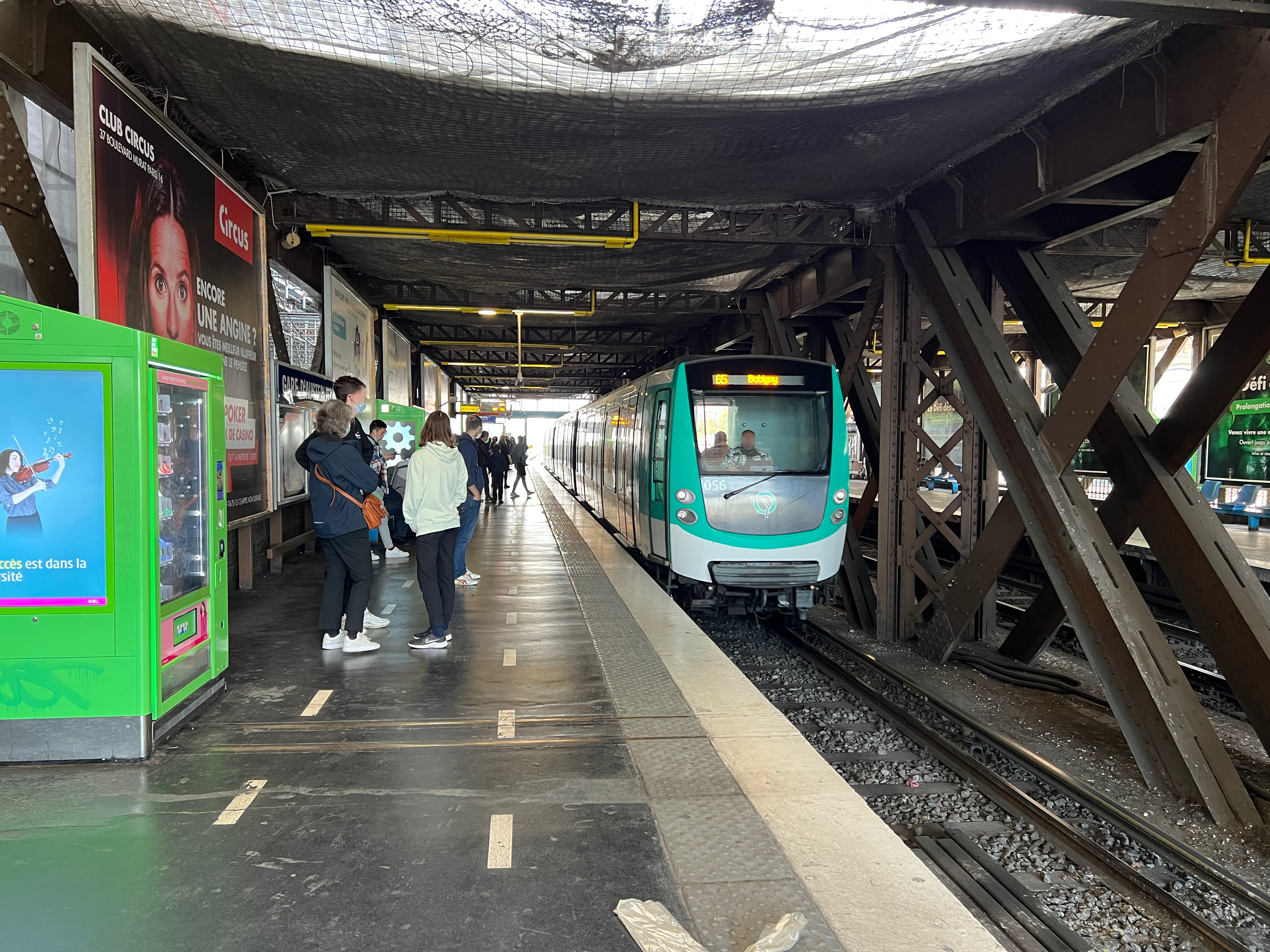
Line 5 platforms

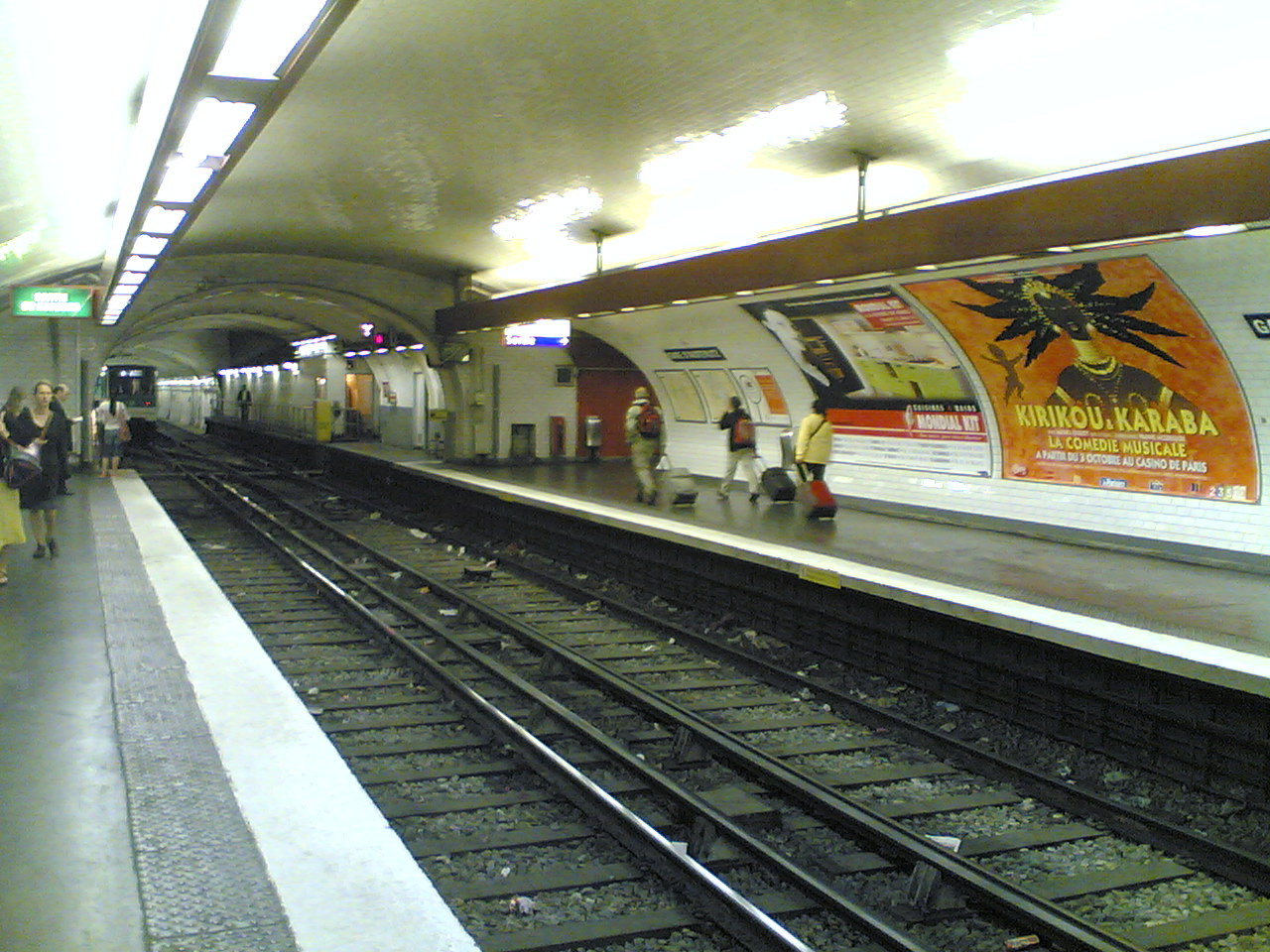
Line 10 platforms at Gare d'Austerlitz
