= Les Gobelins station =

Metro station in Paris, France

Les Gobelins
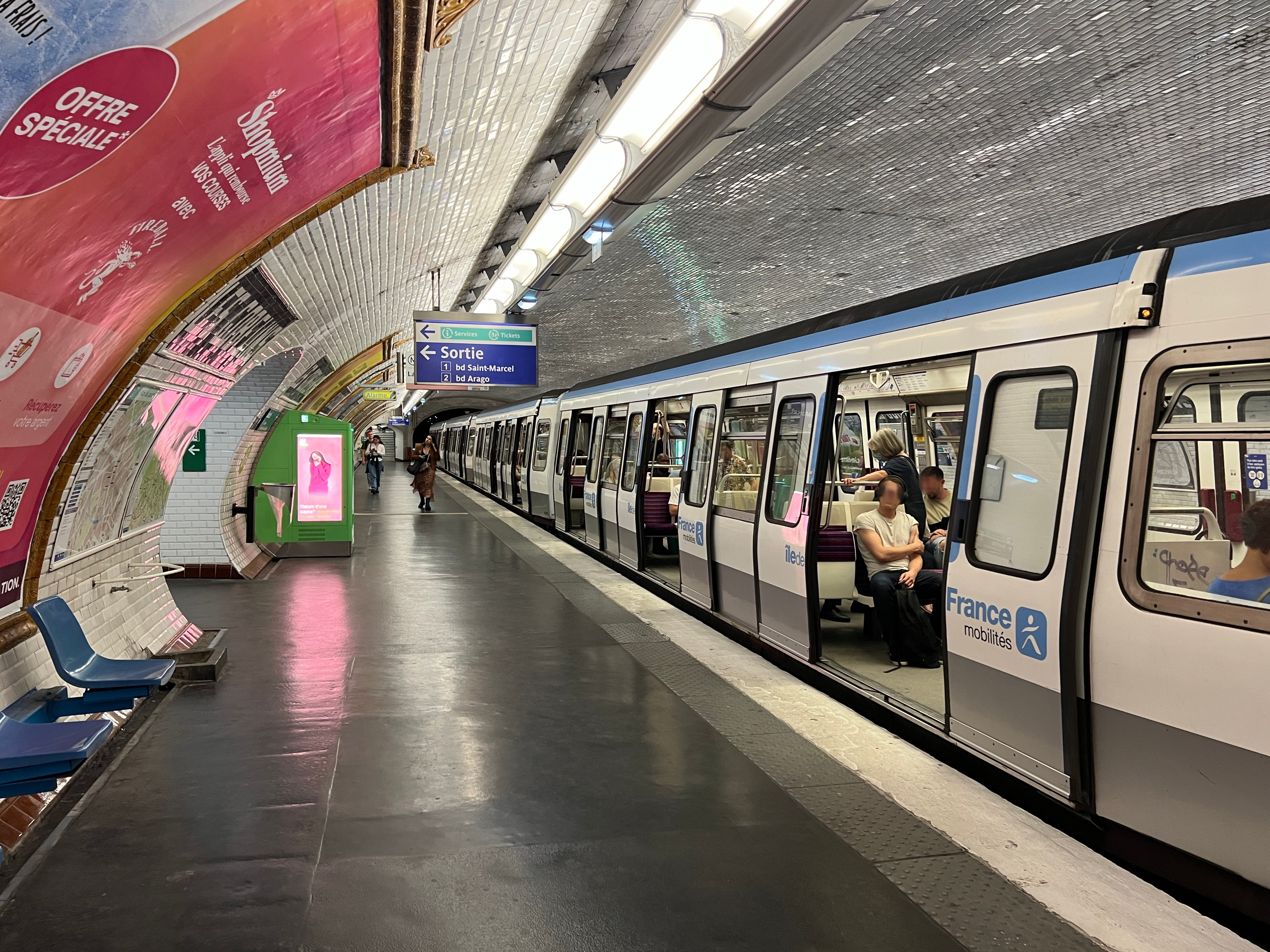
- MF 77 at Les Gobelins

General information
- Location: 13th arrondissement of Paris; Île-de-France; France
- Coordinates: 48°50′11″N 2°21′08″E
- System: Paris Métro station
- Owner: RATP
- Operator: RATP
- Line: Paris Metro Paris Metro Line 7
- Platforms: 2 (2 side platforms)
- Tracks: 2

Construction
- Accessible: no

Other information
- Station code: 1413
- Fare zone: 1

History
- Opened: 15 February 1930; 96 years ago

Passengers
- 2,365,942 (2021)

Services
Preceding station	Paris Metro	Following station
Place d'Italie towards Villejuif–Louis Aragon or Mairie d'Ivry	Line 7	Censier–Daubenton towards La Courneuve–8 mai 1945
Location
- Location within Paris

Les Gobelins (French pronunciation: [le ɡɔblɛ̃]) is a station on line 7 of the Paris Métro on the edges of the 5th and 13th arrondissements.

This station is named after Avenue des Gobelins, which honoured the Gobelin family who manufactured dyes from the mid 15th century on the banks of the nearby river Bièvre (now covered in the area). The family manufactured tapestries from 1662 until its factory (adjacent to the station) was acquired by Louis XIV. It is located at the crossroads of four main roads: avenue des Gobelins, Boulevard Saint Marcel, Boulevard Arago, and Boulevard de Port-Royal.

== History ==
The station opened on 15 February 1930 as part of line 10's extension from Odéon to Place d'Italie. On 26 April 1931, it was transferred to line 7 when its under-Seine crossing from Pont de Sully (now known as Sully–Morland) to Place Monge was completed.

As part of the "Un métro + beau" programme by the RATP, the station's corridors and platform lighting were renovated and modernised on 21 April 2005.

In 2019, the station was used by 3,377,372 passengers, making it the 149th busiest of the Métro network out of 302 stations.

In 2020, the station was used by 1,733,427 passengers amidst the COVID-19 pandemic, making it the 142nd busiest of the Métro network out of 304 stations.

In 2021, the station was used by 2,365,942 passengers, making it the 143rd busiest of the Métro network out of 304 stations.

== Passenger services ==
=== Access ===
The station has 5 accesses:

- Access 1: Boulevard Saint-Marcel
- Access 2: Boulevard Arago
- Access 3: rue Le Brun
- Access 4: Manufacture des Gobelins (an exit only escalator from the southbound platform)
- Access 5: rue des Gobelins

=== Station layout ===
Street Level
B1	Mezzanine
Platform level	Side platform, doors will open on the right
Platform level	Southbound	← toward Villejuif – Louis Aragon or Mairie d'Ivry (Place d'Italie)
Platform level	Northbound	toward La Courneuve–8 mai 1945 (Censier – Daubenton) →
Platform level	Side platform, doors will open on the right

=== Platforms ===
The station has a standard configuration with 2 tracks surrounded by 2 side platforms.

=== Other connections ===
The station is also served by lines 24, 27, 47, 59, 83, and 91 of the RATP bus network, and at night, by lines N01, N02, N15, and N22 of the Noctilien bus network.

== Nearby ==
- Manufacture des Gobelins
- Mobilier National
- Place en Hommage-aux-Femmes-Victimes-de-Violences
- Square René-Le Gall

== Gallery ==
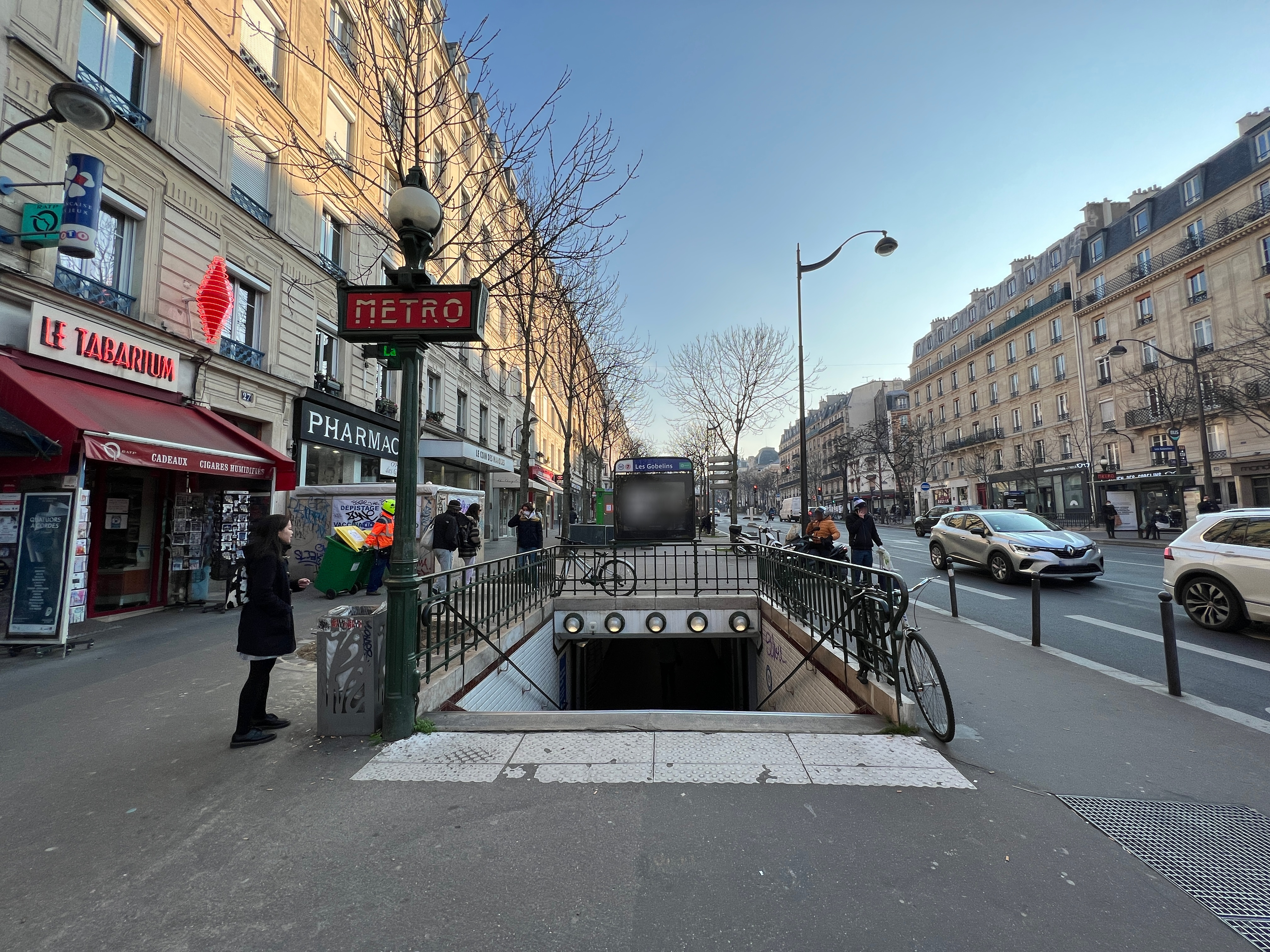
Access 1

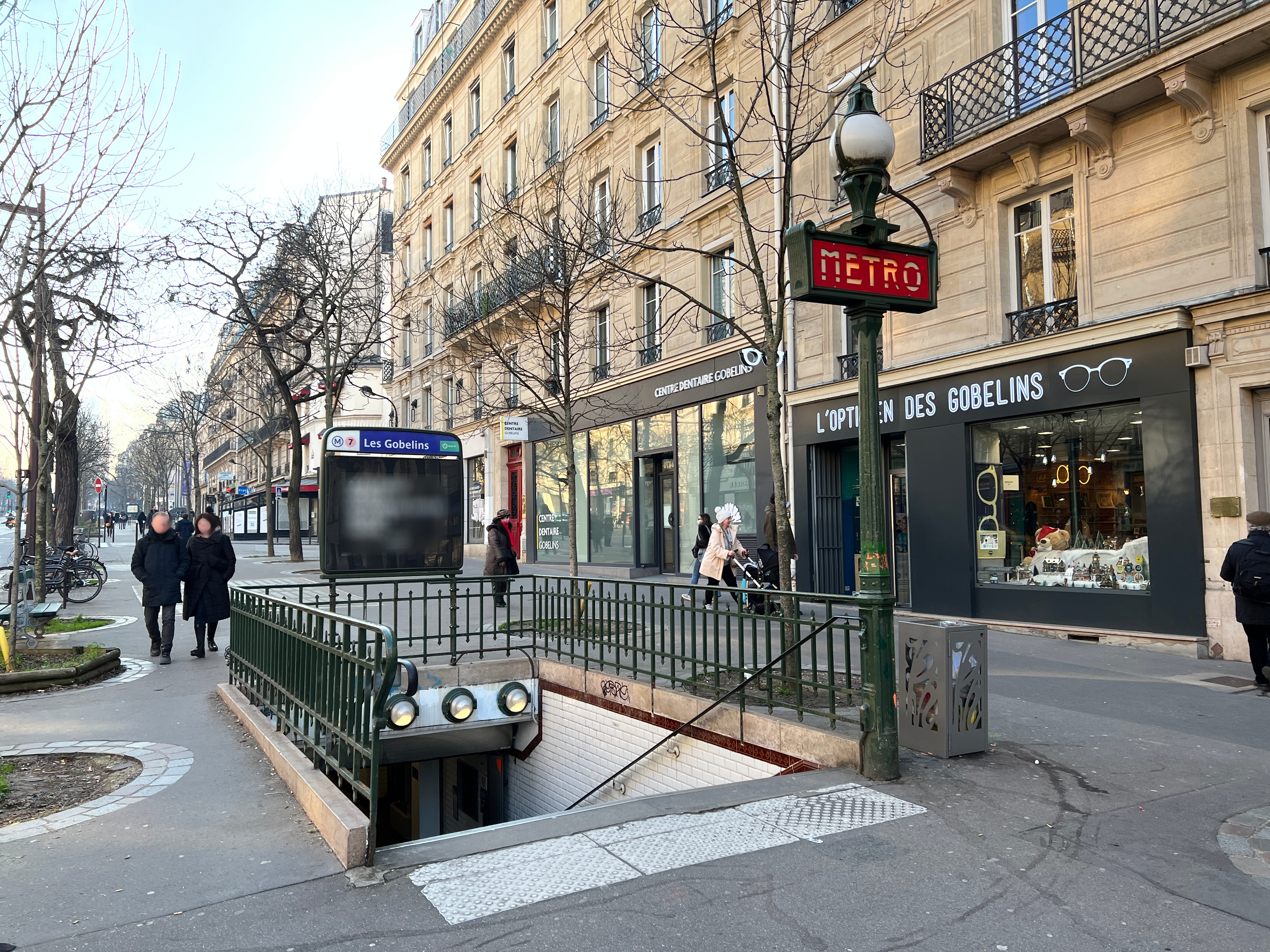
Access 2

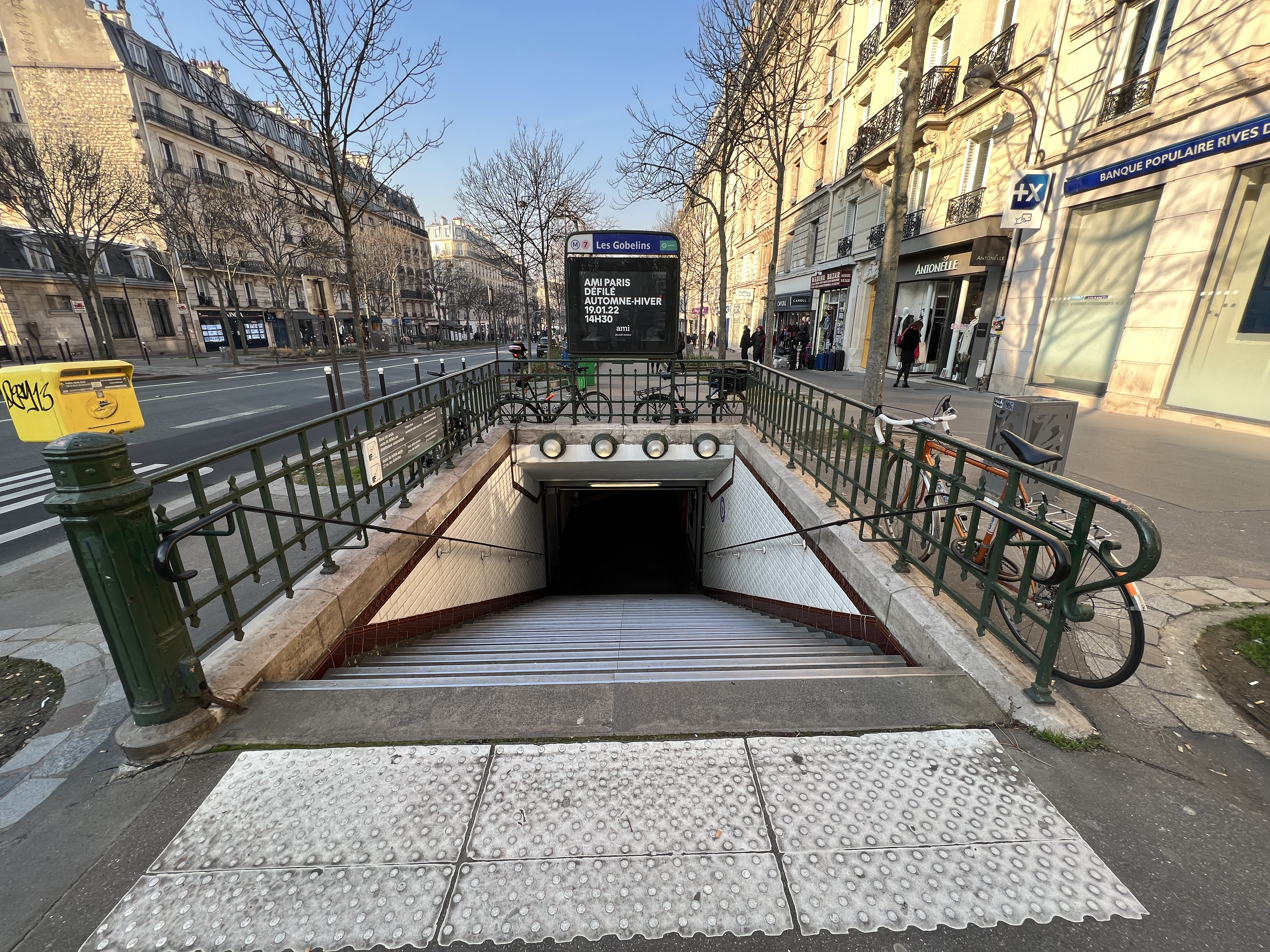
Access 3

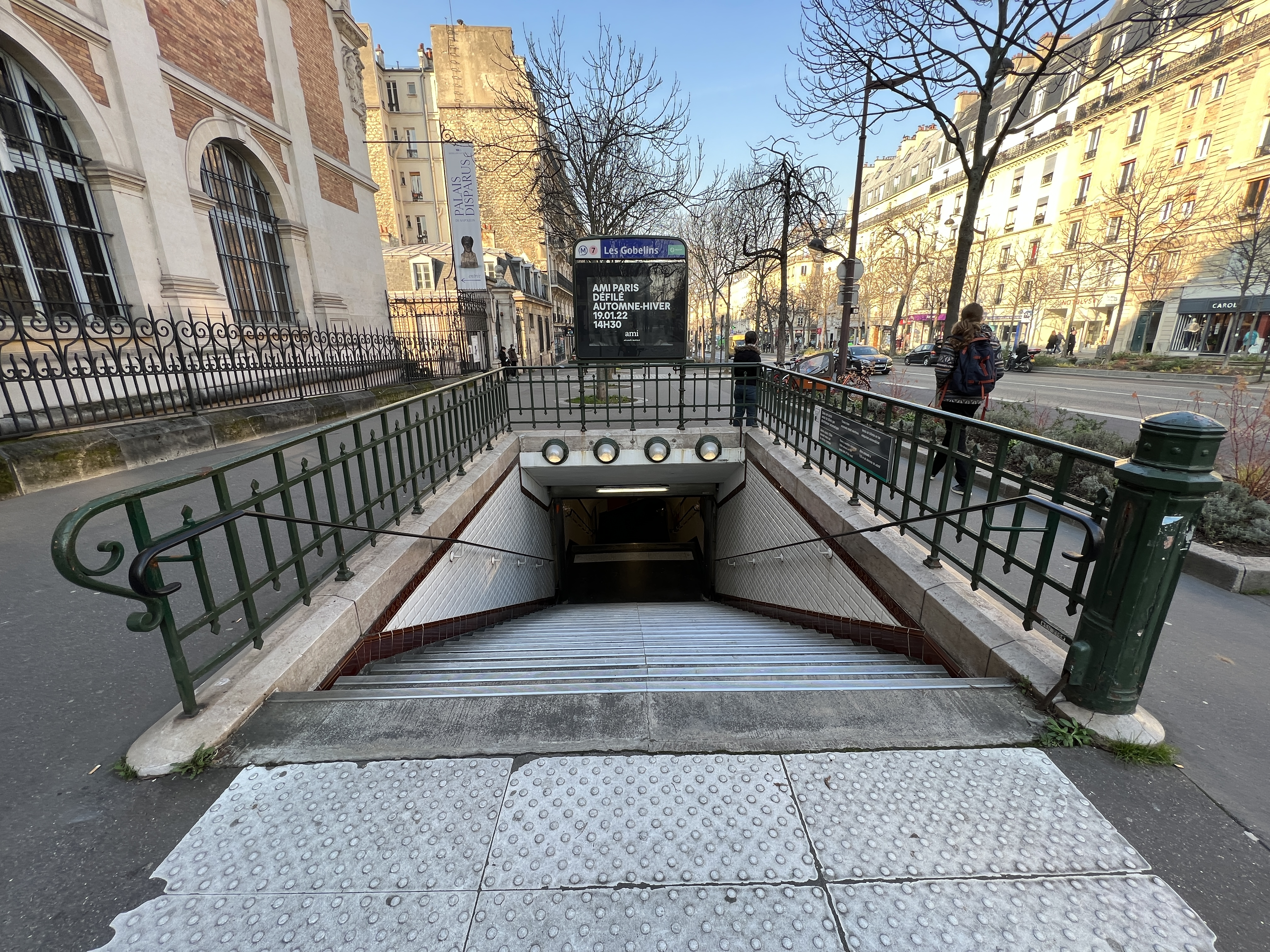
Access 4

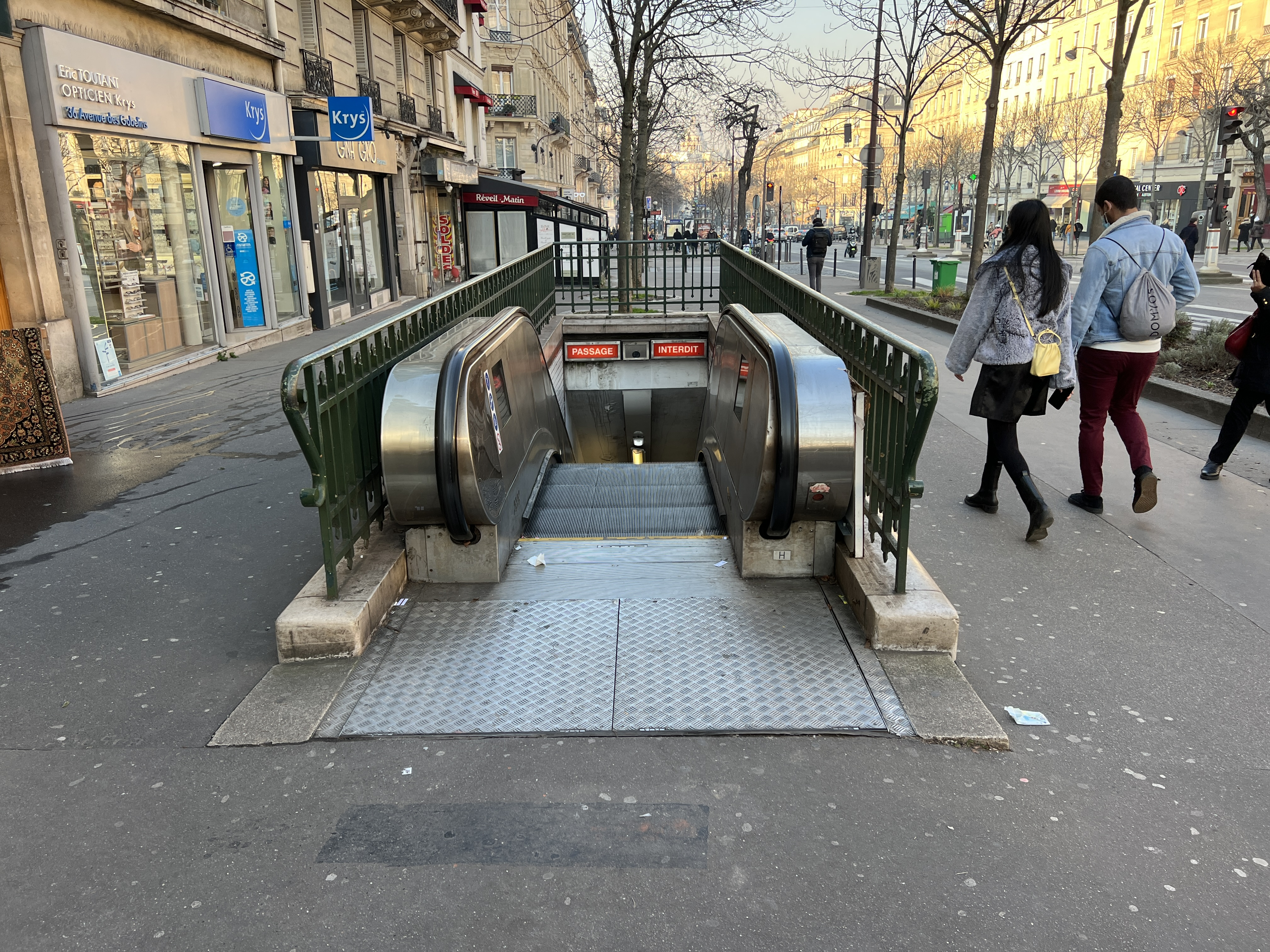
Access 5
