= Censier =

Censier may refer to:

- Censier–Daubenton station, a station of the Parisian Metro
- Censier, a site of the University of Paris III: Sorbonne Nouvelle
