= Censier–Daubenton station =

Metro station in Paris, France

Censier–Daubenton
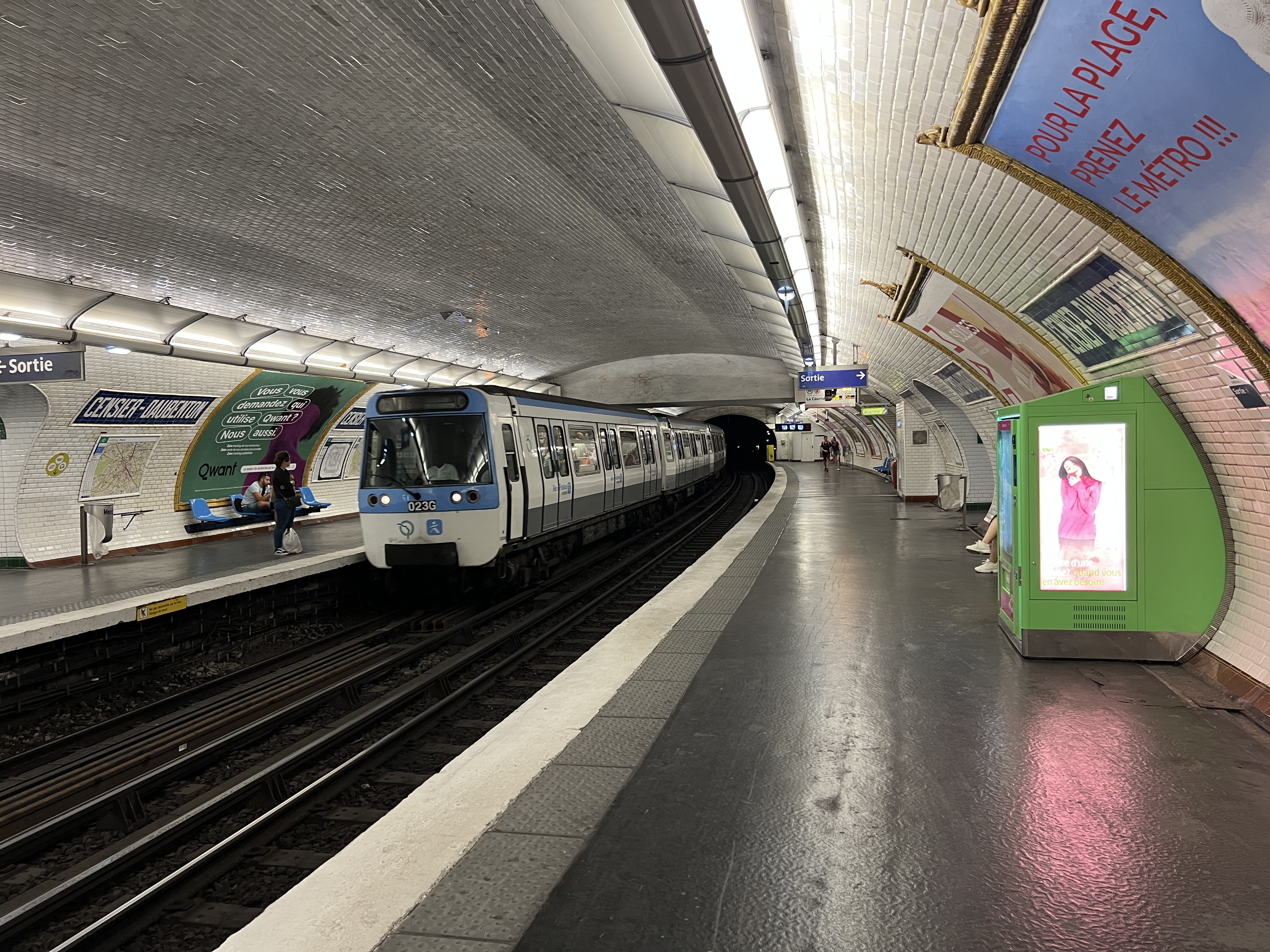
- Station view

General information
- Location: 5th arrondissement of Paris; Île-de-France; France
- Coordinates: 48°50′26″N 2°21′06″E
- System: Paris Métro station
- Owner: RATP
- Operator: RATP

Other information
- Fare zone: 1

History
- Opened: 15 February 1930; 96 years ago

Services
Preceding station	Paris Metro	Following station
Les Gobelins towards Villejuif–Louis Aragon or Mairie d'Ivry	Line 7	Place Monge towards La Courneuve–8 mai 1945
Location
- Location within Paris

Censier–Daubenton (French pronunciation: [sɑ̃sje dobɑ̃tɔ̃]) is a station on Line 7 of the Paris Métro. It opened on 15 February 1930 as part of a planned section of the line, which was temporarily operated as part of Line 10 until the completion of the under-Seine crossing of Line 7 from Pont de Sully to Place Monge. The station was integrated into Line 7 on 26 April 1931.

It is named after the streets of Rue Censier and Rue Daubenton. Censier is the name of the locality. Louis-Jean-Marie Daubenton was a naturalist who collaborated with Georges-Louis Leclerc, Comte de Buffon on his Histoire Naturelle (French for "Natural History"). Daubenton was the first director of the nearby natural history museum, the Muséum national d'Histoire naturelle. Prior to 1965, the station was known as Censier-Daubenton halle aux cuirs. Halle aux cuirs is French for "leather market" and referred to the leather market along the Bièvre River, which is now covered in the area.

== Nearby ==
- Saint-Médard church
- Muséum national d'histoire naturelle (natural history museum)
- Institut national agronomique Paris-Grignon (a former Grandes école, now part of the Paris Institute of Technology for Life, Food and Environmental Sciences)
- Rue Mouffetard
- University of Paris III: Sorbonne Nouvelle

== Station layout ==
Street Level

B1	Connecting level

Line 7 platforms	Side platform, doors will open on the right
Line 7 platforms	Southbound	← toward Villejuif–Louis Aragon or Mairie d'Ivry (Les Gobelins)
Line 7 platforms	Northbound	toward La Courneuve–8 mai 1945 (Place Monge) →
Line 7 platforms	Side platform, doors will open on the right

== Gallery ==
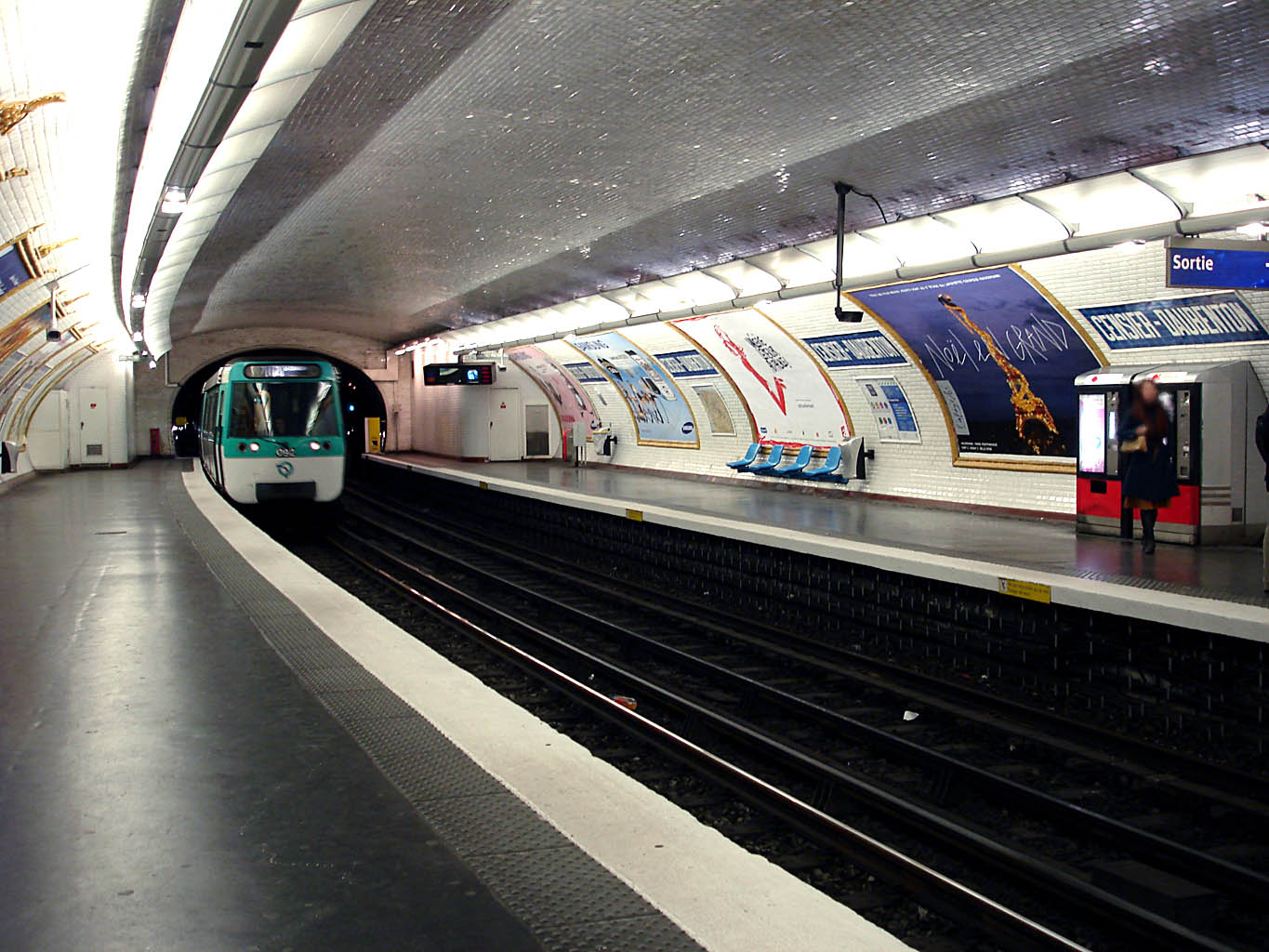
MF 77 rolling stock on Line 7 at Censier–Daubenton
