= Maubert–Mutualité station =

Metro station in Paris, France

Maubert–Mutualité
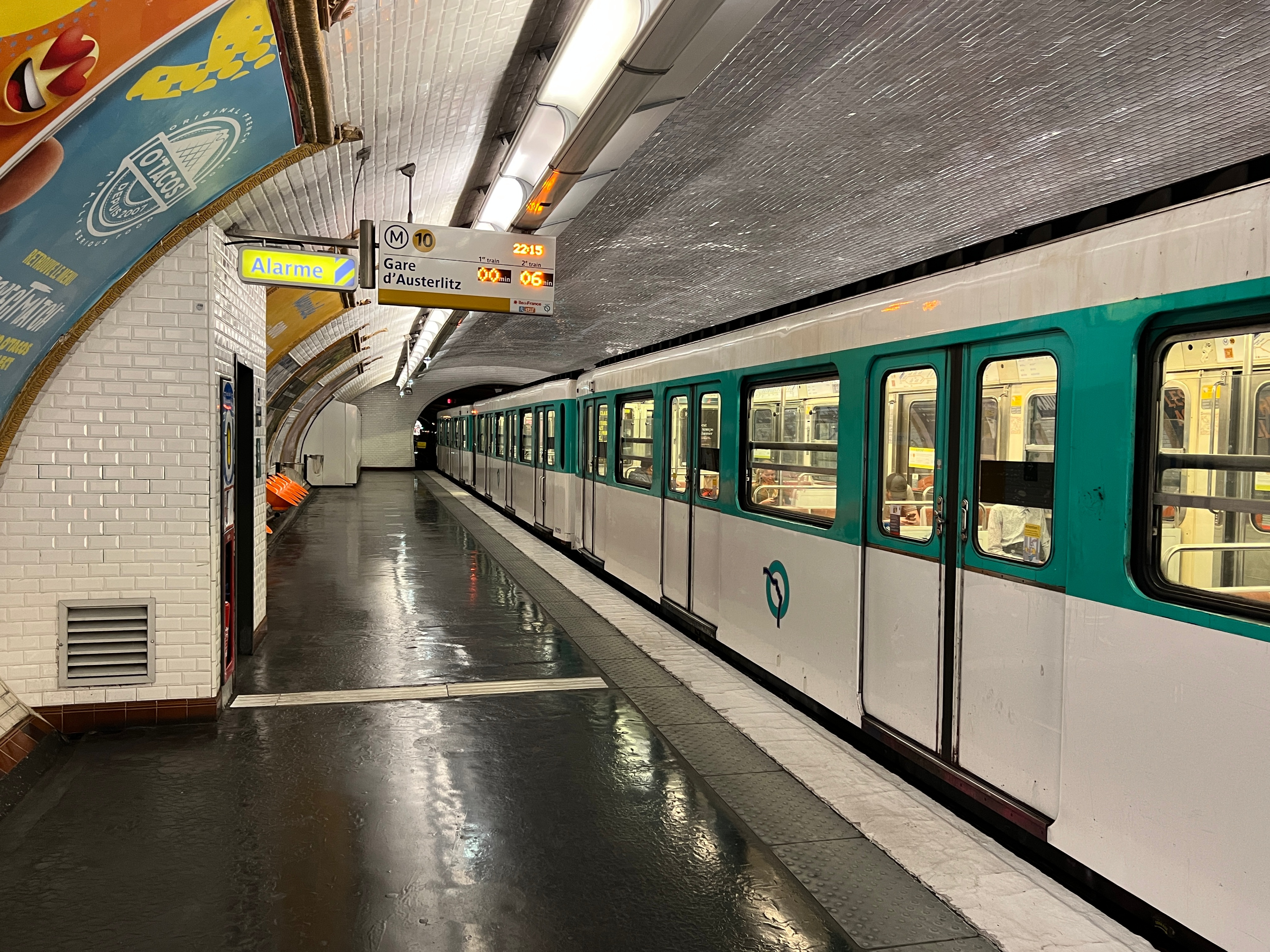

General information
- Location: 5th arrondissement of Paris; Île-de-France; France
- Coordinates: 48°51′01″N 2°20′53″E
- System: Paris Métro station
- Owner: RATP
- Operator: RATP

Other information
- Fare zone: 1

History
- Opened: 15 February 1930

Services
Preceding station	Paris Metro	Following station
Cluny–La Sorbonne towards Boulogne–Pont de Saint-Cloud	Line 10	Cardinal Lemoine towards Gare d'Austerlitz
Location
- Location within Paris

Maubert–Mutualité (French pronunciation: [mobɛʁ mytɥalite]) is a station on Line 10 of the Paris Métro. Located in the 5th arrondissement, it is situated at the heart of the Latin Quarter on the Rive Gauche.

== History ==
The station is covered in white tiles like most other stations of the Métro, and uses a barrel vault that runs lengthwise over the tracks and platform. However, it is unique in that near the center of the platform two parallel tubes of moving orange lights trace the curve of the vaulted ceiling over the tracks from one side to the other.

The station was opened on 15 February 1930 with the extension of Line 10 from Odéon to Place d'Italie (now on Line 7). It is named after Place Maubert (Maubert Square) and the nearby Maison de la Mutualité.

As part of the RATP's "Metro Renewal" programme, its corridors and platform lighting were renovated and inaugurated on 21 October 2003, while a small, specific lighting installation had been inaugurated on the platforms.

In 2021, ridership was gradually recovering: 1,280,387 passengers entered the station, which placed it in 253rd position among 304 metro stations.

== Passenger services ==
=== Access ===
The station has three entrances divided into four metro entrances, each adorned with a Dervaux-type balustrade:

- Access 1 – Rue Lagrange, consisting of two fixed staircases, each adorned with a Dervaux candelabra, leading on either side of Boulevard Saint-Germain to the west of Place Maubert, one to the right of no. 49, the other facing no. 62;
- Access 2 – Place Maubert - Palais de la Mutualité, also consisting of a fixed staircase with a Dervaux mast, located to the west of the square along the odd-numbered pavement of Boulevard Saint-Germain;
- Access 3 – Rue des Carmes, consisting of an escalator going up allowing only the exit from the platform in the direction of Gare d'Austerlitz, located on the same square to the right of no. 47 ter of Boulevard Saint-Germain.

=== Station layout ===
Street Level

B1	Mezzanine

Line 10 platforms	Side platform, doors will open on the right
Line 10 platforms	Westbound	← toward Boulogne–Pont de Saint-Cloud (Cluny–La Sorbonne)
Line 10 platforms	Eastbound	toward Gare d'Austerlitz (Cardinal Lemoine) →
Line 10 platforms	Side platform, doors will open on the right

=== Platforms ===
Maubert–Mutualité is a station with a standard configuration. It has two platforms separated by the metro tracks and the vault is elliptical. The decoration is in the style used for most metro stations. The lighting canopies are white and rounded in the Gaudin style of the metro revival of the 2000s, and the bevelled white ceramic tiles cover the walls, the vault and the tunnel exits. The advertising frames are made of honey-coloured earthenware and the name of the station is also made of earthenware in the style of CMP, the original operator of the Métro. The seats are in the orange Akiko style.

The station is distinguished by the presence of two parallel tubes of flashing orange-yellow lights in its centre, which follow the curvature of the vault along the corridor passing over the tracks. The scenography was provided by Bernard Baissait and his graphic design agency.

=== Bus connections ===
The station is served by lines 47, 63, 86 and 87 of the RATP bus network.

== Nearby ==
- Maison de la Mutualité

== Gallery ==
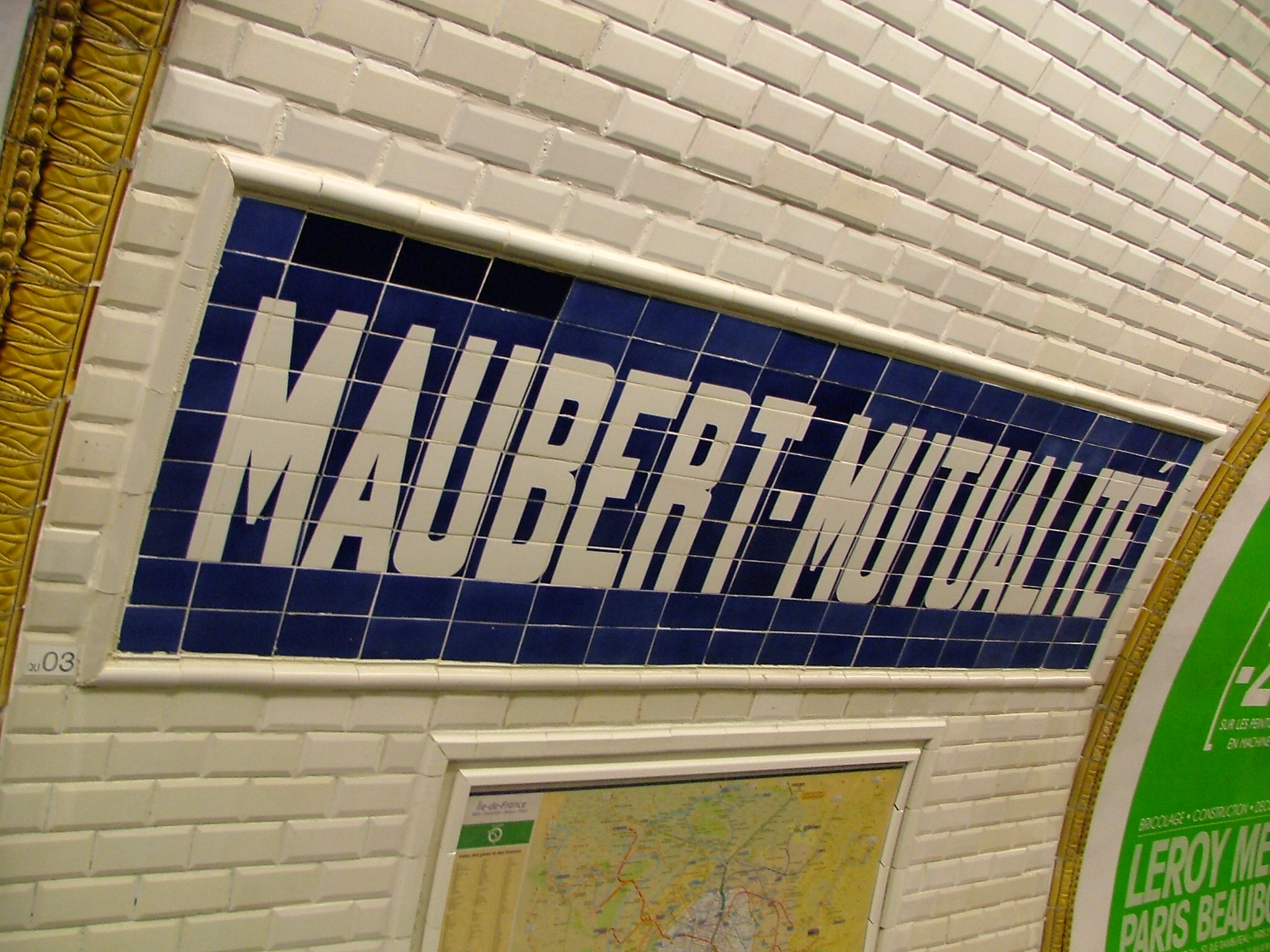
Station sign

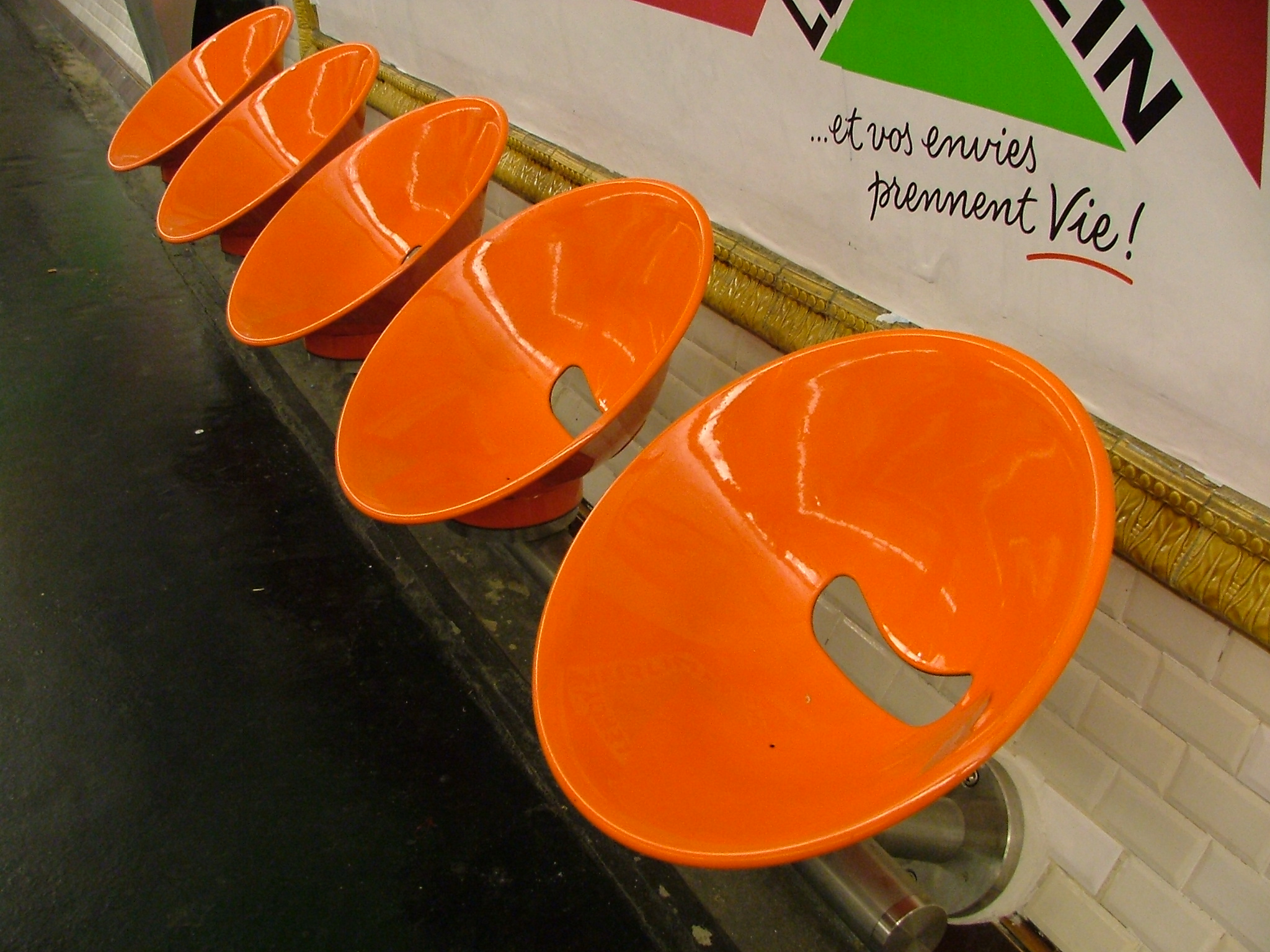
Maubert–Mutualité is one of a few Métro stations to use these odd-shaped seats dating from the 1980s.
