= Cardinal Lemoine station =

Paris Métro station

Cardinal Lemoine
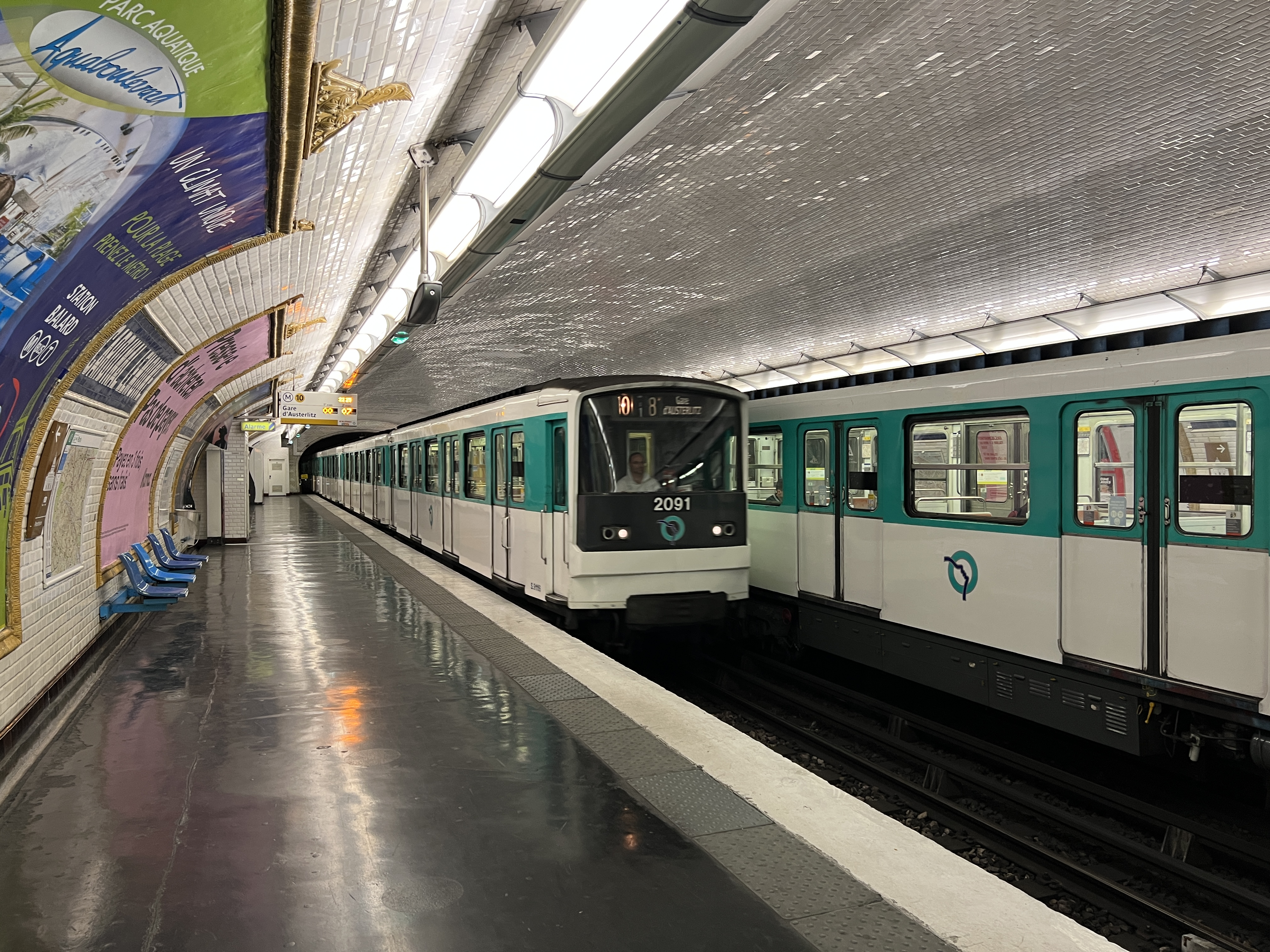
- MF 67 at station

General information
- Location: 5th arrondissement of Paris; Île-de-France; France
- Coordinates: 48°50′50″N 2°21′04″E
- System: Paris Métro station
- Owner: RATP
- Operator: RATP

Other information
- Fare zone: 1

History
- Opened: 26 April 1931

Services
Preceding station	Paris Metro	Following station
Maubert–Mutualité towards Boulogne–Pont de Saint-Cloud	Line 10	Jussieu towards Gare d'Austerlitz
Location
- Location within Paris

Cardinal Lemoine (French pronunciation: [kaʁdinal ləmwan]) is a station on Line 10 of the Paris Métro. It is located the 5th arrondissement.

== History ==
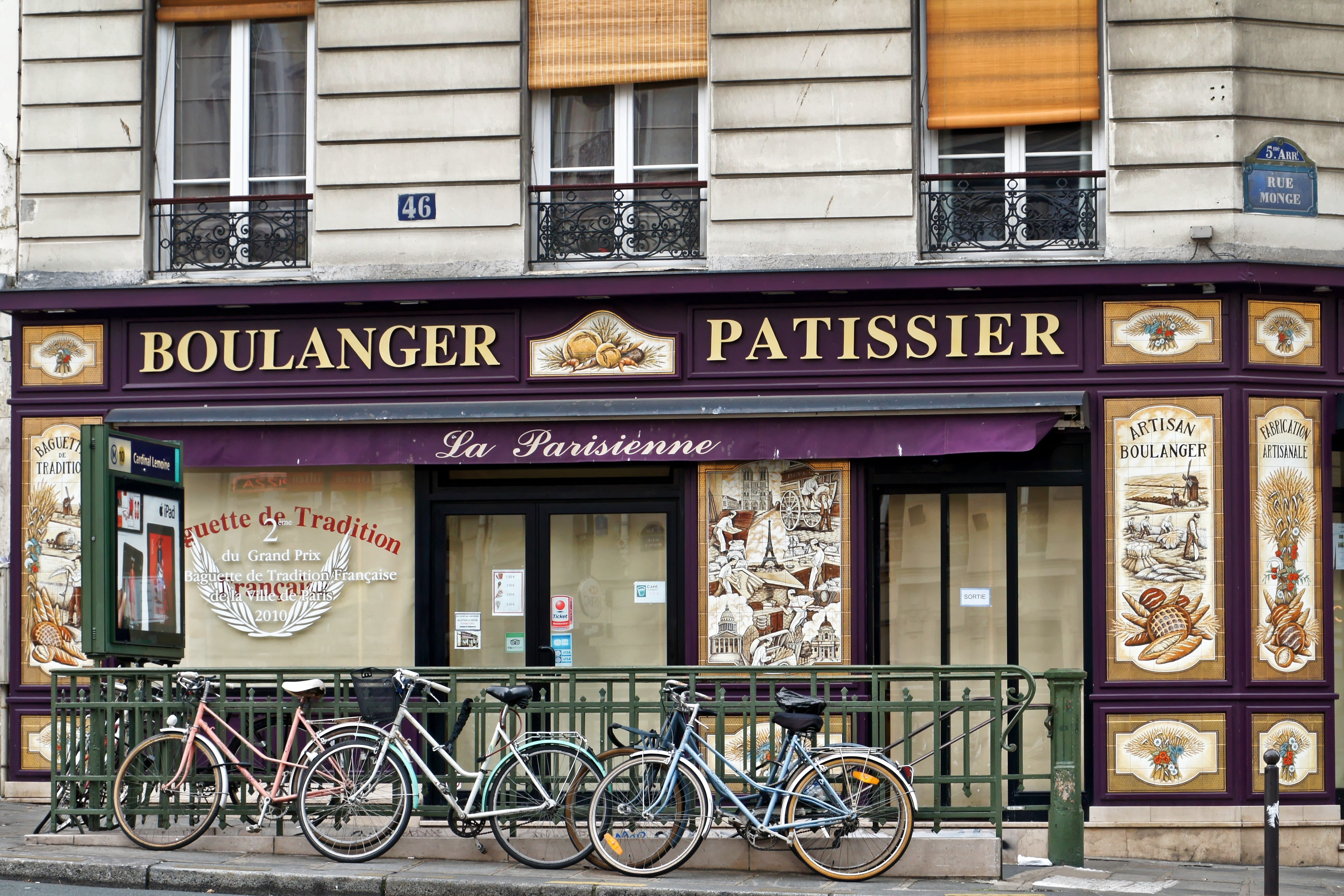
Entrance on Rue Monge

The station was opened on 26 April 1931 with the transfer of the section of Line 10 between Maubert – Mutualité and Place Monge to Line 7. Line 10 was deviated from its old route east of Maubert – Mutualité to the new station of Jussieu. Cardinal Lemoine was built at the southeastern end of the old route under Rue Monge.

It is named after the Rue du Cardinal Lemoine, named after Cardinal Jean Lemoine (1250–1313), a papal legate of Pope Boniface VIII to Philip IV the Fair. The Lycée Henri-IV is nearby.

As part of the RATP's "Metro Renewal" programme, the station's corridors and platform lighting were renovated and inaugurated on 20 November 2006.

== Passenger services ==
=== Access ===
The station has two entrances, each consisting of a fixed staircase embellished with a Dervaux-type balustrade:

- Access 1 - Rue du Cardinal-Lemoine, adorned with a Dervaux candelabra, leads to no. 55 of this street and no. 29 bis of Rue Monge;
- Access 2 - Rue Monge is located to the right of no. 28 of the same street.

=== Station layout ===
Street Level

B1	Mezzanine

Line 10 platforms	Side platform, doors will open on the right
Line 10 platforms	Westbound	← toward Boulogne – Pont de Saint-Cloud (Maubert – Mutualité)
Line 10 platforms	Eastbound	toward Gare d'Austerlitz (Jussieu) →
Line 10 platforms	Side platform, doors will open on the right

=== Platform ===
Cardinal Lemoine is a standard configuration station. It has two platforms separated by the metro tracks and the vault is elliptical. The decoration is in the style used for most metro stations. The lighting canopies are white and rounded in the Gaudin style of the metro revival of the 2000s, and the bevelled white ceramic tiles cover the walls, the vault and the tunnel exits. The advertising frames are made of honey-coloured earthenware and the name of the station is also made of earthenware in the style of the original CMP. The Motte style seats are blue in colour. However, the station is distinguished by the lower part of its walls, which are vertical and not elliptical.

=== Bus connections ===
The station is served by lines 47, 75 and 89 of the RATP Bus Network.

== Nearby ==
- Montagne Sainte-Geneviève (located at the foot of this hill in the Latin Quarter, which has been known since the Middle Ages as the student district)
- Ministère de l'Enseignement supérieur, de la Recherche et de la Science
- Collège de France (situated on Place Marcelin-Berthelot)
- Lycée Henri-IV (situated on Rue Clovis)
- La Rue Mouffetard and its many shops
- La Nécropole républicaine du Panthéon
