= Jussieu station =

Paris Métro station

Jussieu
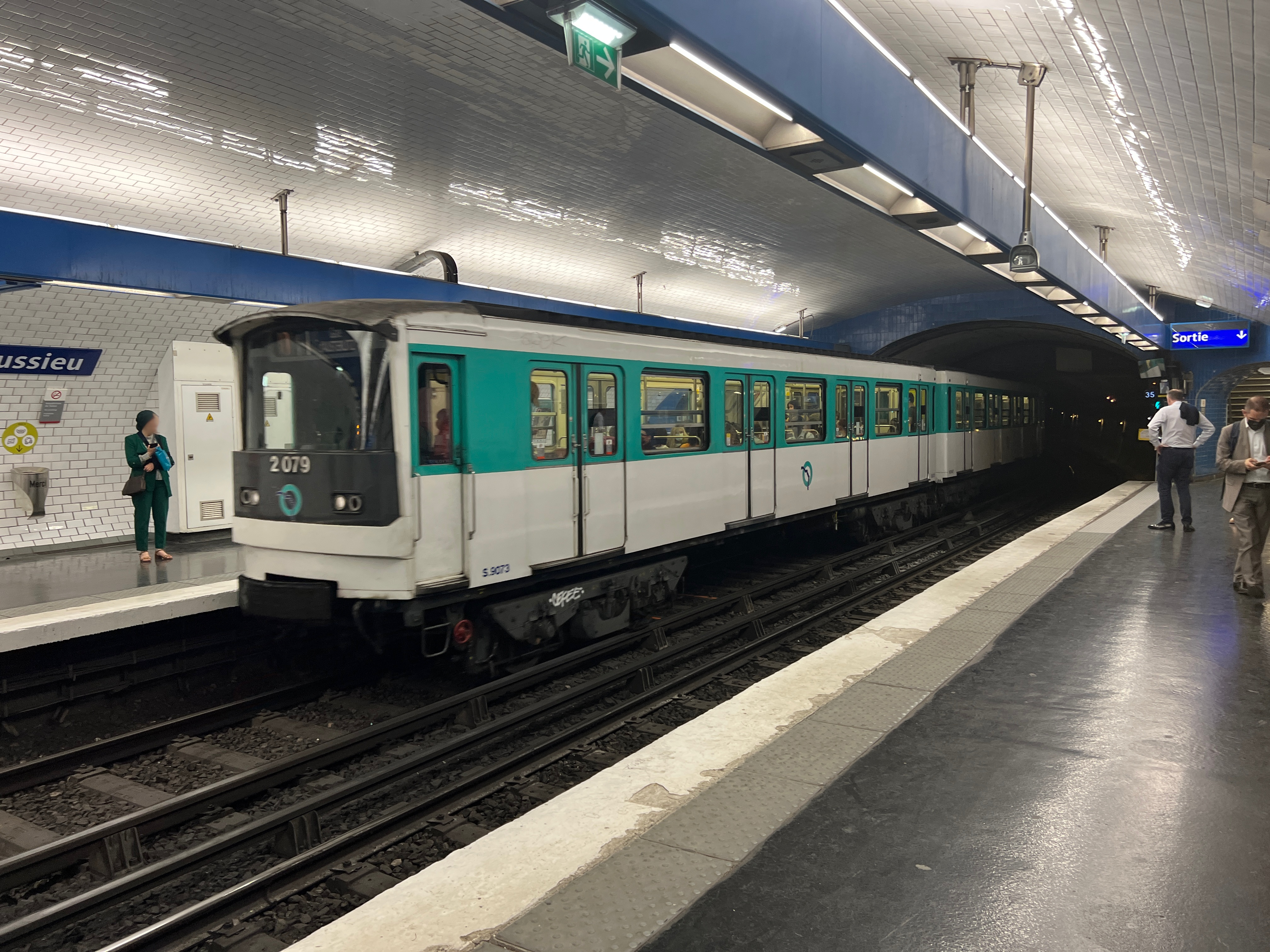
- Line 10 platforms at Jussieu

General information
- Location: 5th arrondissement of Paris; Île-de-France; France
- Coordinates: 48°50′46″N 2°21′21″E
- System: Paris Métro station
- Owner: RATP
- Operator: RATP

Other information
- Fare zone: 1

History
- Opened: 26 April 1931; 95 years ago

Services
Preceding station	Paris Metro	Following station
Place Monge towards Villejuif–Louis Aragon or Mairie d'Ivry	Line 7	Sully–Morland towards La Courneuve–8 mai 1945
Cardinal Lemoine towards Boulogne–Pont de Saint-Cloud	Line 10	Gare d'Austerlitz Terminus
Location
- Location within Paris

Jussieu (French pronunciation: [ʒysjø]) is a station on lines 7 and 10 of the Paris Métro in the eastern part of the Latin Quarter in the 5th arrondissement.

== History ==
The station was opened on 26 April 1931 with the extension of line 7 from Pont de Sully to Place Monge and its incorporation of part of Line 10 from Place Monge to Porte de Choisy. At the same time the remaining section of line 10 was extended from the new station of Cardinal Lemoine to Jussieu.

It was formerly called Jussieu - Halle-aux-vins, but today only the name of Jussieu remains, because the small Halle aux Vins, created by Napoleon I, has disappeared and in its location is now (since 1957) the Jussieu Campus (now Campus Pierre-et-Marie-Curie). The station is under and named after the Place Jussieu, which was named after the De Jussieu family of famous botanists and historians of the natural world, several of whom have been associated with the nearby Jardin des Plantes.

The platforms for the two lines were renovated in the Andreu-Motte style in 1975, but for the first time with flat tiling instead of the traditional bevelled tiling.

During the first half of 2020, work was undertaken to provide the station with a second escalator to exit the station. This was parallel to the main entrance and directly connects the ticket hall to the road network. The operation was accompanied with a redevelopment of Place Jussieu.

In 2020, with the Covid-19 crisis, 1,891,986 travellers entered this station, which places it in 127th position among metro stations for its usage.

In 2021, attendance is gradually increasing, with 2,889,642 travellers entering this station, which places it in 114th position among metro stations for usage.

== Passenger services ==
=== Access ===
The station has three entrances all located on Place Jussieu. The first two lead to Rue Linné, one of which has an escalator only for entering, the other a staircase. The third, also equipped with an escalator, is used as an exit only from the station.

=== Station layout ===
Street Level

B1	Mezzanine

Line 10 platforms	Side platform, doors will open on the right
Line 10 platforms	Westbound	← toward Boulogne–Pont de Saint-Cloud (Cardinal Lemoine)
Line 10 platforms	Eastbound	toward Gare d'Austerlitz (Terminus) →
Line 10 platforms	Side platform, doors will open on the right

Line 7 platforms	Side platform, doors will open on the right
Line 7 platforms	Southbound	← toward Villejuif–Louis Aragon or Mairie d'Ivry (Place Monge)
Line 7 platforms	Northbound	toward La Courneuve–8 mai 1945 (Sully–Morland) →
Line 7 platforms	Side platform, doors will open on the right

=== Platforms ===
The platforms of the two lines are of standard configuration. Two platforms per stopping point ar separated by the metro tracks located in the centre and the vault is elliptical. The two stations are positioned at the same level in parallel and in a slight curve on the east side. However, the platforms of line 10 are 75 meters long while those of line 7 are 105 meters long. Access corridors in the right wall common to the two stations allow a direct connection between the platform of line 10 in the direction of Gare d'Austerlitz and that of line 7 in the direction of Mairie d'Ivry or Villejuif - Louis Aragon. The decoration is in the Andreu-Motte style with two light canopies, with the tunnel exits covered with flat coloured tiling and Motte seats are in orange for line 7 and blue for line 10. This layout is combined in the two cases with the flat white ceramic tiles that cover the side walls, the vault and the outlets of the corridors. The advertising frames are metallic and the name of the station is written in Parisine font on enamel plates.

=== Bus connections ===
The station is served by the 67 and 89 lines of the RATP Bus Network (towards Gare de Vanves only) as well as by line 87 (from the Jussieu - Minéraux stop located approximately 200 meters away and serving as the terminus and departure point for partial services specific to this line from Monday to Friday at peak times and at the start of the evening).

== Nearby attractions ==
- The Université Pierre et Marie Curie
- The Arènes de Lutèce, an ancient Roman amphitheatre
- The Jardin des Plantes
- The Institut du Monde Arabe (Institute of the Arab World)

== Gallery ==
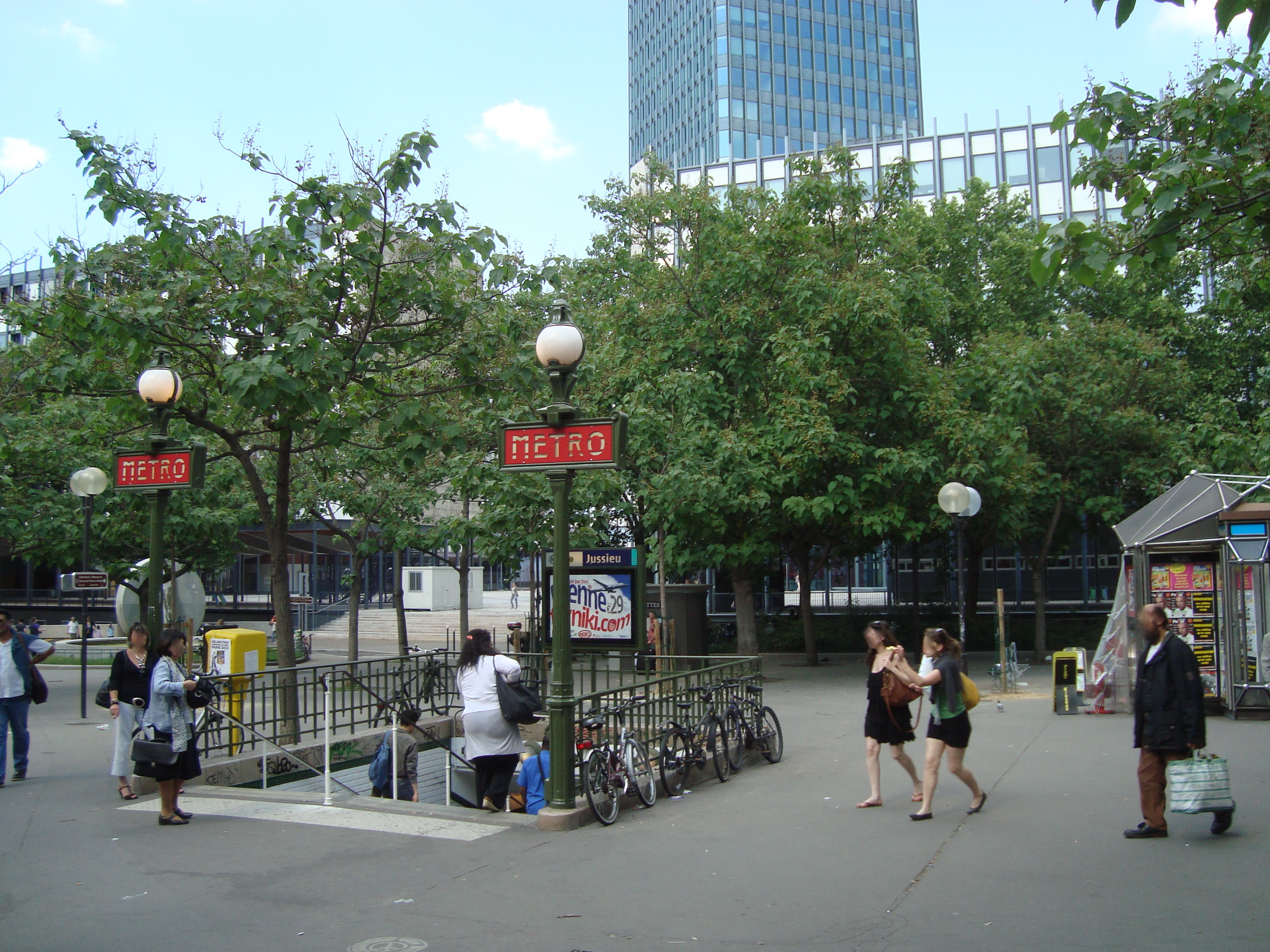
Street-level entrance at Jussieu

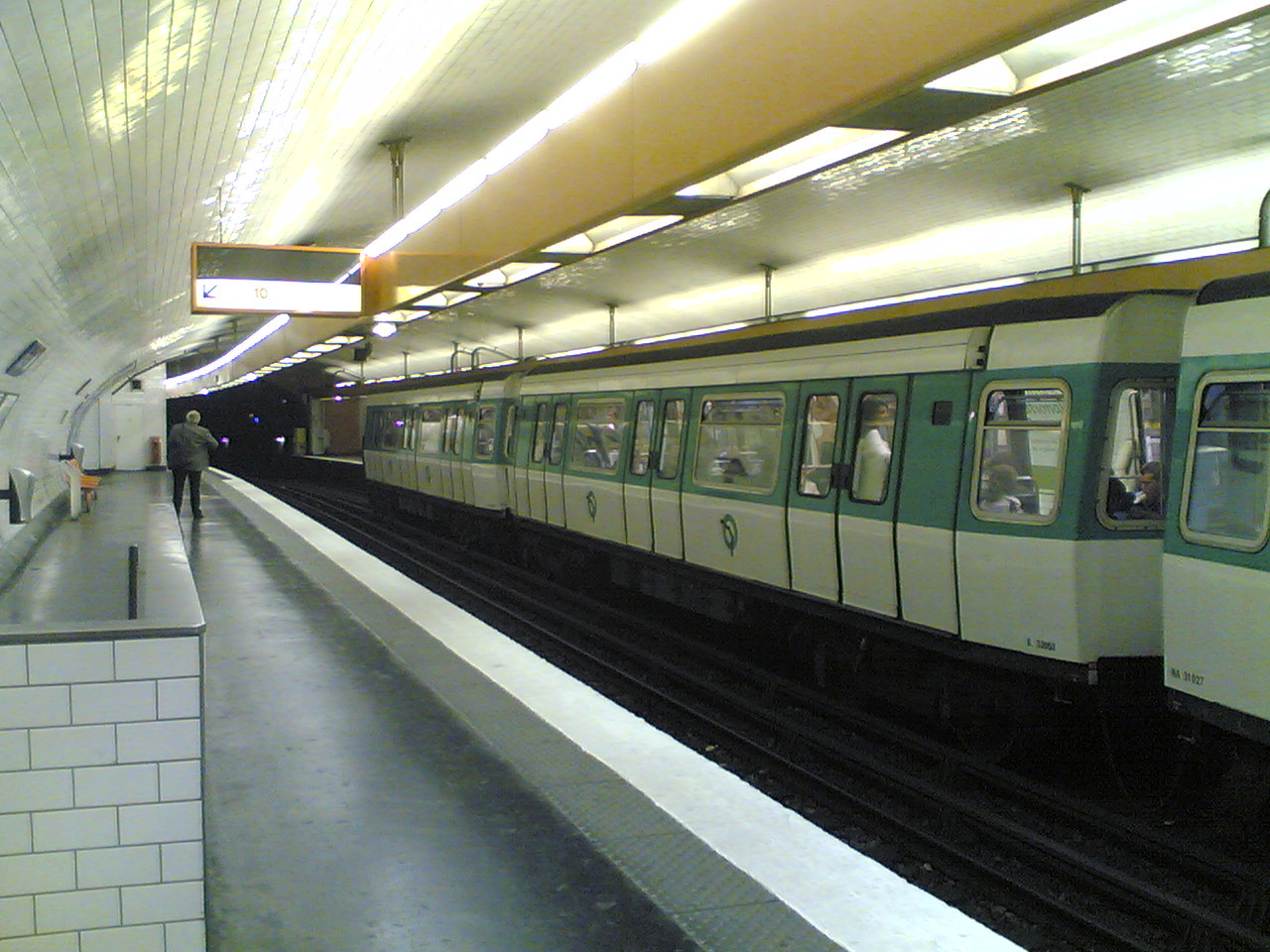
Line 7 platforms at Jussieu
