= Place Monge station =

Metro station in Paris, France

Place Monge
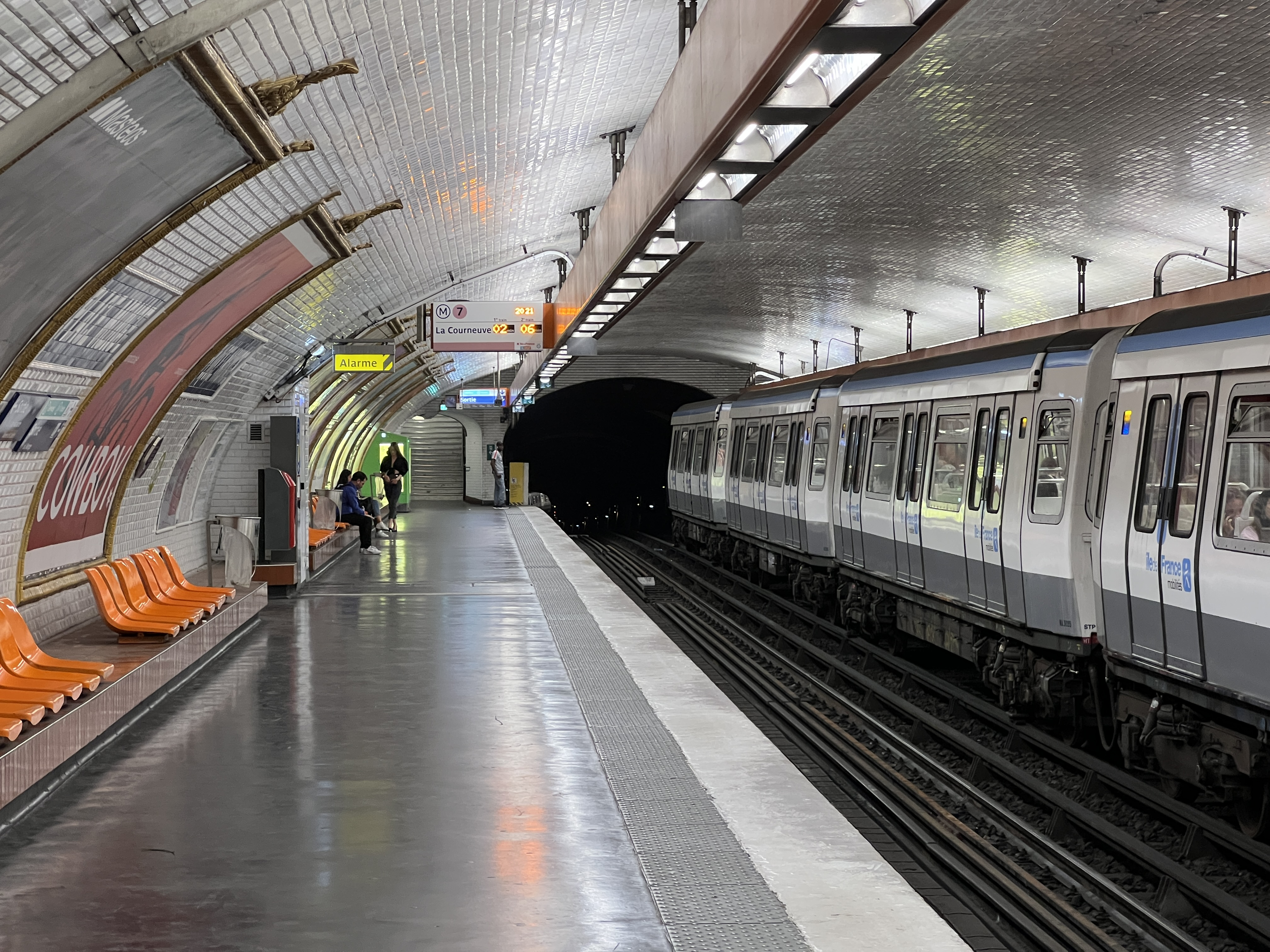
- Platforms view

General information
- Location: 5th arrondissement of Paris; Île-de-France; France
- Coordinates: 48°50′37″N 2°21′08″E
- System: Paris Métro station
- Owner: RATP
- Operator: RATP

Other information
- Fare zone: 1

History
- Opened: 15 February 1930; 96 years ago

Services
Preceding station	Paris Metro	Following station
Censier–Daubenton towards Villejuif–Louis Aragon or Mairie d'Ivry	Line 7	Jussieu towards La Courneuve–8 mai 1945
Location
- Location within Paris

Place Monge (French pronunciation: [plas mɔ̃ʒ]) is a station on Line 7 of the Paris Métro and located in the 5th arrondissement of Paris.

== Location ==
The station is located in the middle of the 5th arrondissement of Paris, under the Rue Monge to the north-east of the Place Monge. Oriented along a north-south axis, it is interspersed between the Jussieu and Censier - Daubenton metro stations. In the direction of Mairie d'Ivry and Villejuif - Louis Aragon, it was preceded by a connection with line 10, which was in commercial service for a year, from 1930 to 1931, when this line had as its terminus Porte de Choisy.

== History ==
It opened on 15 February 1930 as part of a planned section of the line, which was temporarily operated as part of Line 10 until the completion of the under-Seine crossing of Line 7 from Pont de Sully. This former arrangement can still be seen at the north of the station where a non-revenue track diverges on the left, leading to Cardinal Lemoine (now on Line 10). The station was integrated into Line 7 on 26 April 1931.

It serves Place Monge, named after Gaspard Monge (1746–1818), a French mathematician who is best known as the inventor of descriptive geometry. The station is located in the eastern part of the Latin Quarter. Nearby are the Jardin des Plantes (botanical garden), the Roman remains of the Arènes de Lutèce and the Rue Mouffetard, a street with restaurants and a lively street market.

== Passenger services ==
=== Access ===
The station has two accesses divided into three metro entrances:

- access 1 - Place Monge consisting of a fixed staircase adorned with a balustrade and a Dervaux-type candelabrum, located to the north-east of the square, and an exit with an entourage designed by Joseph Cassien-Bernard comprising two escalators leading to the southeast of said square;
- access 2 - Rue de Navarre, with an original kiosk with two entrances whose architecture echoes that of the Arènes de Lutèce, located on the even sidewalk of Rue de Navarre, adjoining the Square des Arènes de Lutèce and Square Capitan.

=== Station layout ===
Street Level

B1	Connecting level

Line 7 platforms	Side platform, doors will open on the right
Line 7 platforms	Southbound	← toward Villejuif – Louis Aragon or Mairie d'Ivry (Censier – Daubenton)
Line 7 platforms	Northbound	toward La Courneuve–8 mai 1945 (Jussieu) →
Line 7 platforms	Side platform, doors will open on the right

=== Platforms ===
Place Monge is a station with a standard configuration. It has two platforms separated by the metro tracks and the vault is elliptical. The decoration is in the Andreu-Motte style with two brown light canopies, benches covered in flat brown tiles and orange Motte seats. These fittings are combined with the bevelled white ceramic tiles that cover the side walls, the vault, the tunnel exits and the outlets of the corridors. The advertising frames are in honey-coloured earthenware with plant motifs and the name of the station is also in earthenware in the Interwar period of the original CMP.

The platforms were designed to accommodate trains 105 meters long, but only 75 meters are actually used. A track device is located at the north end of the station in the unused part of the platforms, a very rare case on the network that was also found at the Saint-Lazare station on line 14.

=== Bus connections ===
The station is served by line 47 of the RATP Bus Network and, at night, by lines N15 and N22 of the Noctilien network.

== Nearby ==
- Square des Arènes de Lutèce and Square Capitan
- Arènes de Lutèce
- Rue Mouffetard
- Jardin des plantes
