= Quai des Célestins =

Thoroughfare in Paris, France

Coordinates: 48.8523°N 2.3607°E

The Quai des Célestins runs along the Seine in Paris' 4th arrondissement. The quay, or dock, runs into the Quai Henri-IV upstream, and downstream becomes the Quai de l'Hôtel-de-Ville.

== History ==
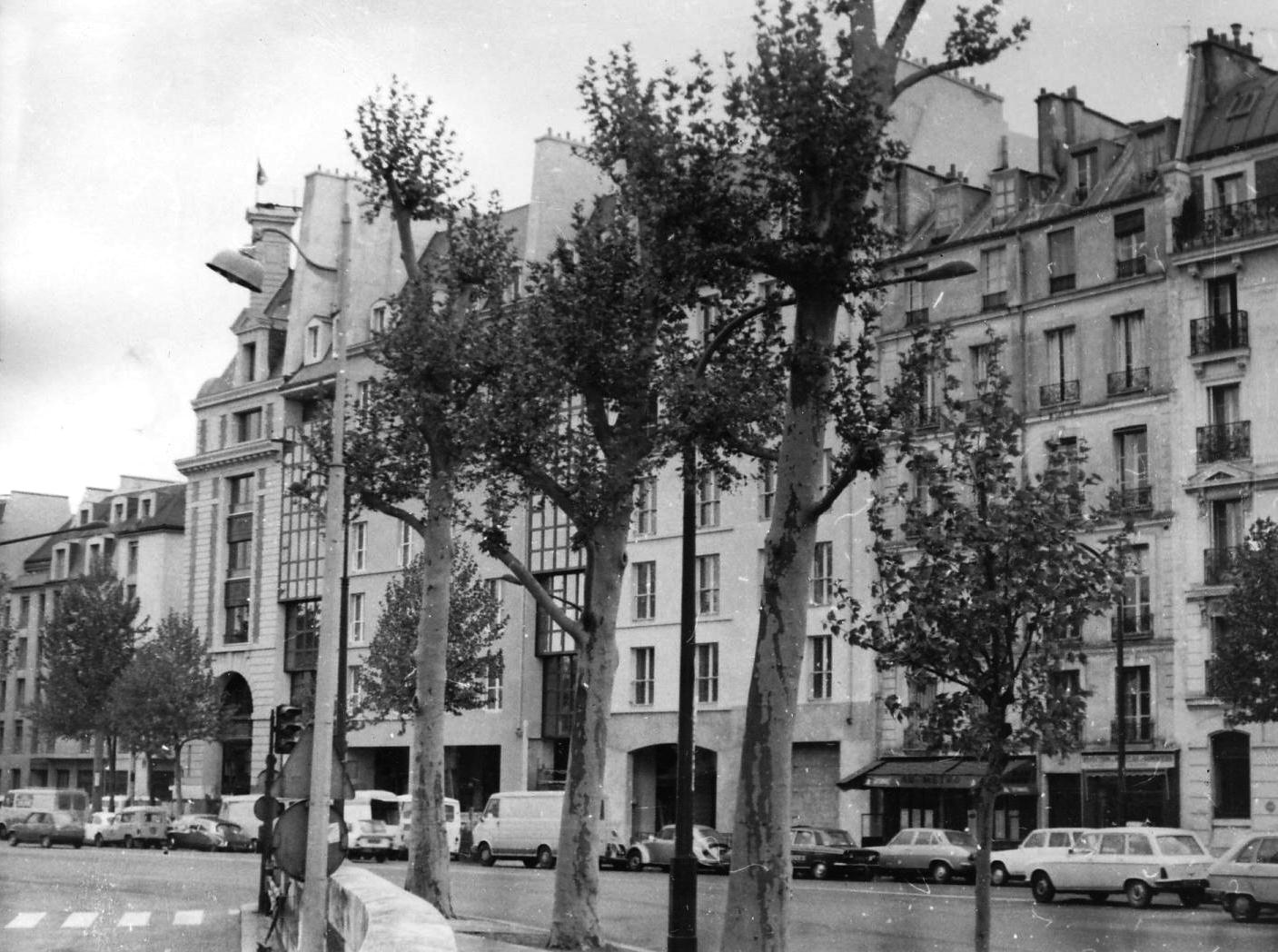
Quai des Célestins in 1981

The quay was named after the couvent des Célestins, located at the current site of the Caserne des Célestins of the Garde républicaine.

The main entrance to the Hôtel Saint-Pol, also vanished now, was on the Quai des Célestins.

The quay was rebuilt and paved in 1705.

== Notable locations ==
- At the level of the Boulevard Henri-IV is the Square Henri-Galli, notable for the remains of one of the eight towers of the Bastille prison.
- 2 et 2bis: Hôtel Fieubet or La Vallette, situated at the location of the royal Hôtel Saint-Pol, granted in 1519 by King Francis I. In 1587, Raymond Phélypeaux d'Herbault built a first hôtel particulier there. In 1676, it was acquired by the chancellor of Queen María Teresa of Spain, Gaspard Fieubet. Fieubet had it renovated and decorated by Le Sueur and Vicotte according to the plans of Jules Hardouin-Mansart. In 1816, the hôtel became a sugar refinery. In 1857, the count of Lavalette acquired it and had it transformed by Jules Gros in a neo-Baroque Italo-Spanish style, especially the street-side and court-side façades. Since 1877, it has been the location of the école Massillon.
- 32: edge of the city of Paris, location of the former Tour Barbeau destroyed at the end of the 16th century or the very beginning of the 17th.
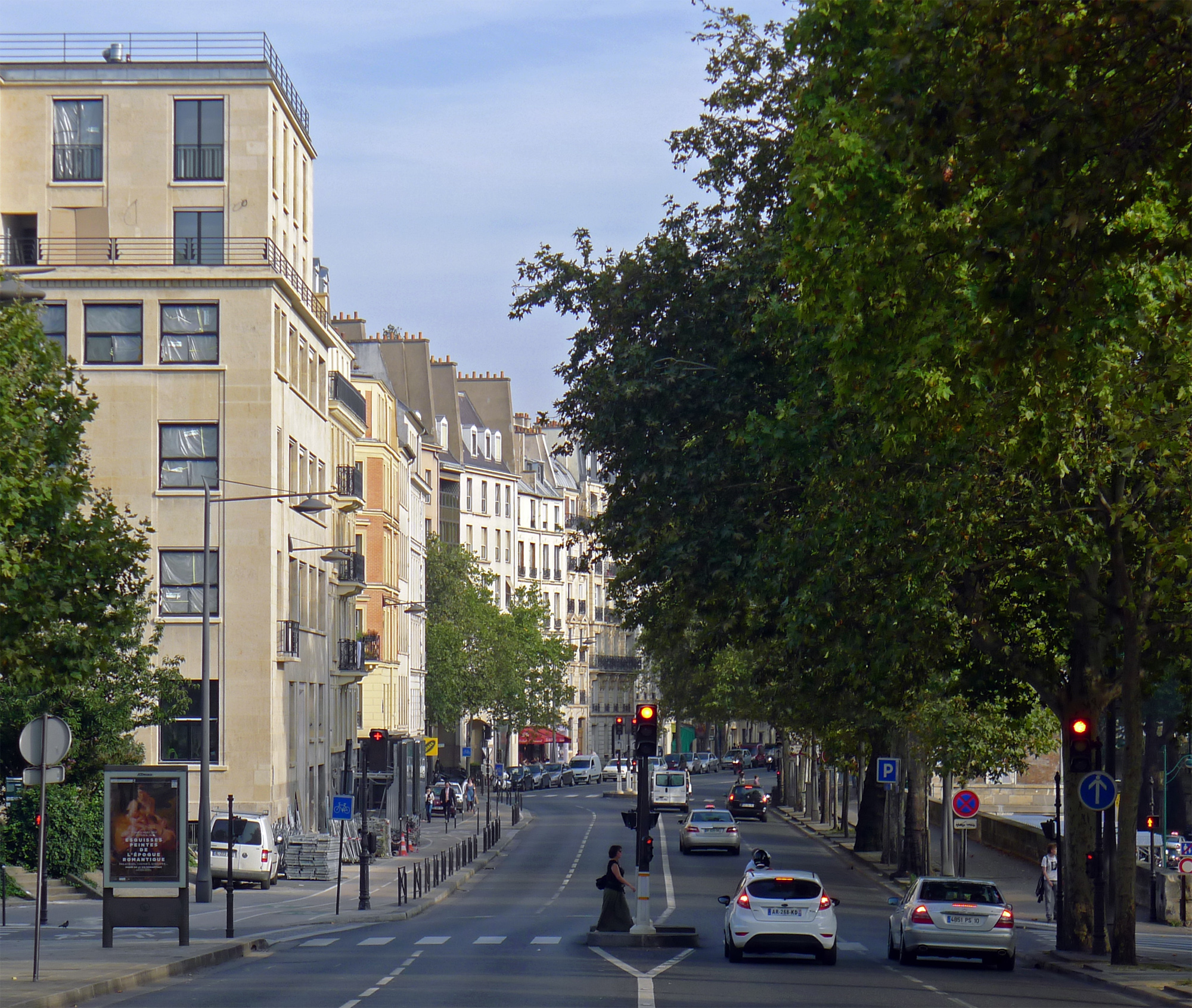
Quai des Célestins seen from the Quai de l'Hôtel-de-Ville

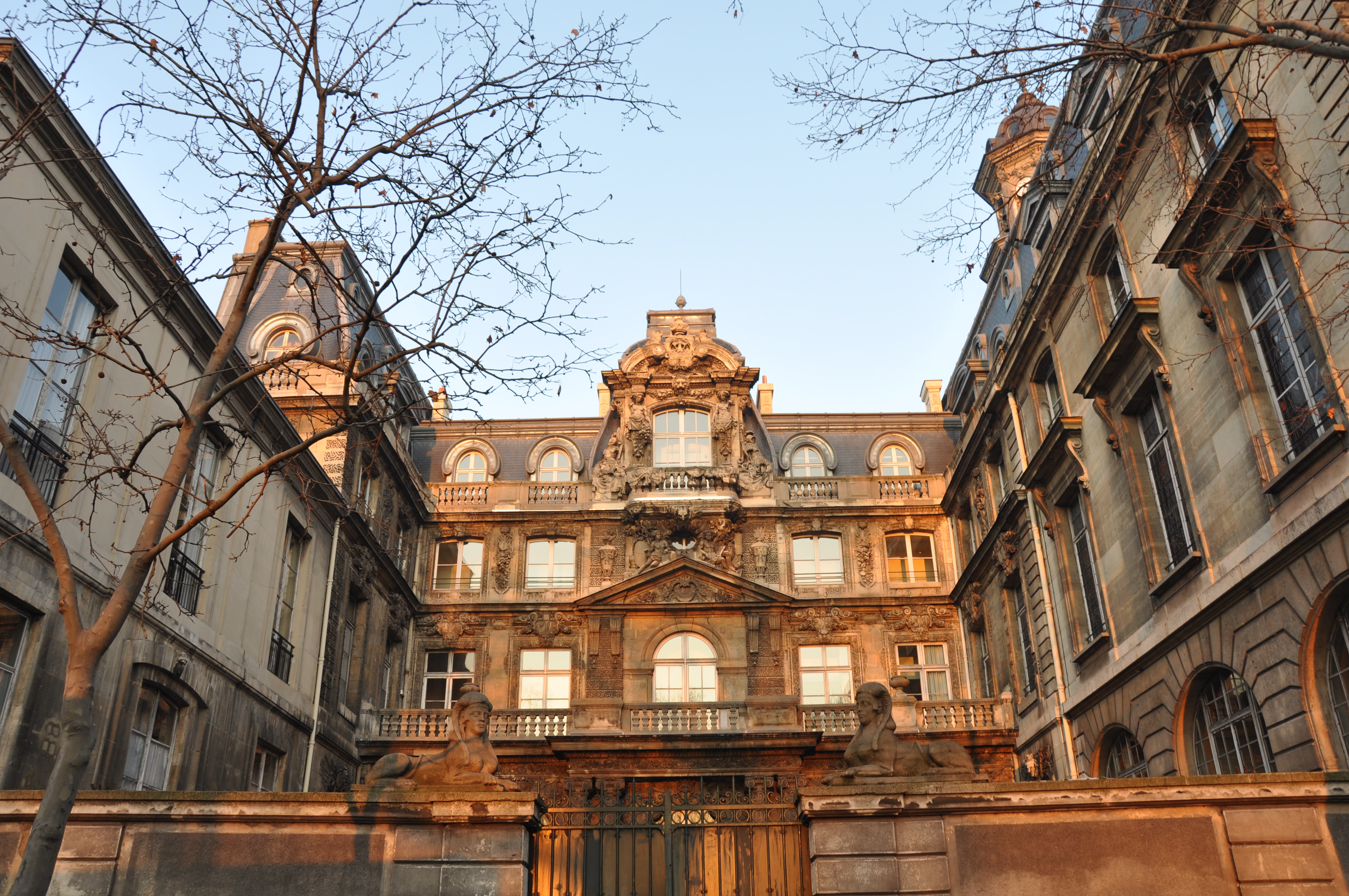
École Massillon

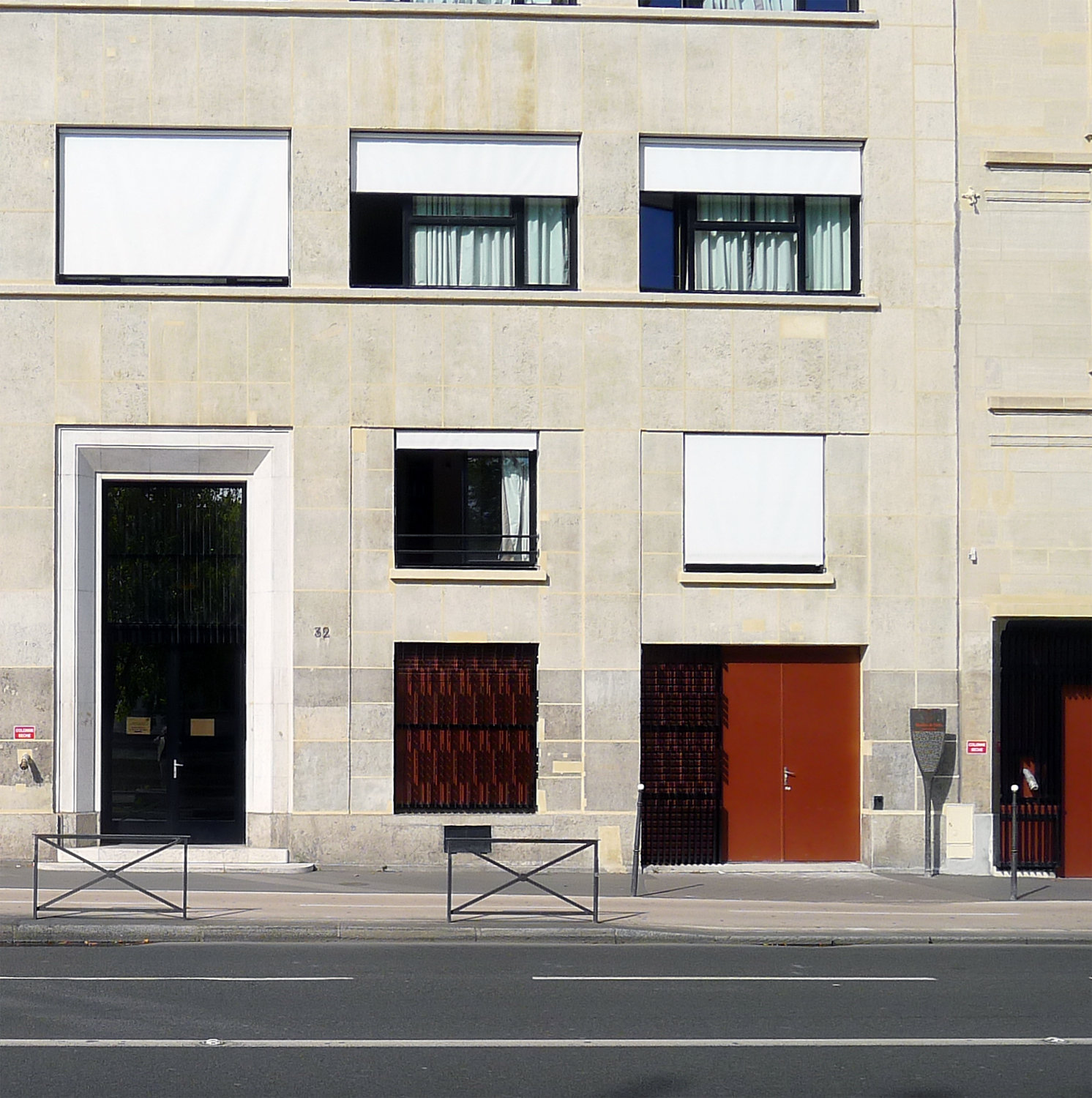
No. 32

== Access ==
The Quai des Célestins is served by and is close to the Metro line, at the Pont Marie et Sully - Morland stations as well as the RATP bus lines 67 86 87.
