= Sully–Morland station =

Metro station in Paris, France

Sully–Morland
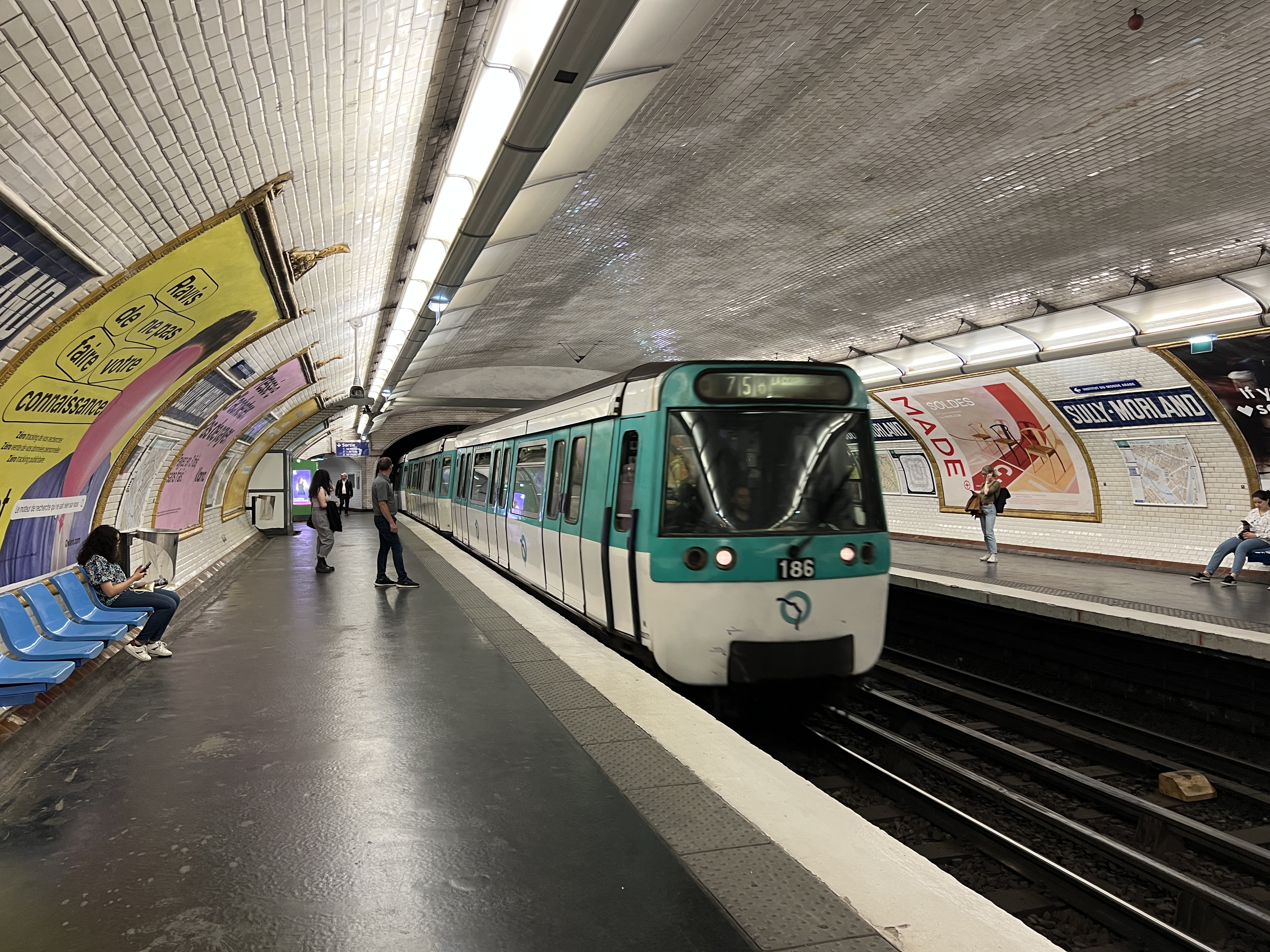

General information
- Location: 4th arrondissement of Paris; Île-de-France; France
- Coordinates: 48°51′05″N 2°21′43″E
- System: Paris Métro station
- Owner: RATP
- Operator: RATP

Other information
- Fare zone: 1

History
- Opened: 3 June 1930; 96 years ago

Services
Preceding station	Paris Metro	Following station
Jussieu towards Villejuif–Louis Aragon or Mairie d'Ivry	Line 7	Pont Marie towards La Courneuve–8 mai 1945
Location
- Location within Paris

Sully–Morland (French pronunciation: [syli mɔʁlɑ̃]) is a station of the Paris Métro on line 7 of the Paris metro, located in the 4th arrondissement of Paris.

== Location ==
The station is located under the Quai des Célestins, at the intersection of Boulevard Morland and Boulevard Henri-IV, near the Seine and the Pont de Sully. Oriented along a north-west/south-east axis, it is interspersed between the Pont Marie and Jussieu metro stations. Downstream of the station, in the direction of Mairie d'Ivry and Villejuif - Louis Aragon, the line makes a 90-degree bend towards the south-west and plunges under the Seine on a 40% slope towards Jussieu metro station.

== History ==
Named after the Pont de Sully and the Boulevard Morland. The Pont de Sully commemorates Maximilien de Béthune, Baron of Rosny, Duke of Sully (1560–1641), friend and Minister to King Henri IV. It crosses the Seine to the Île Saint-Louis and the Boulevard Saint-Germain. The Boulevard Morland was named after Colonel François-Louis Morlan (called "Morland", 1771–1805), who was killed at Austerlitz, with his body being repatriated in a barrel of rum.

== Passenger services ==
=== Access ===
The station has four entrances, each consisting of a fixed staircase embellished with a Dervaux-style balustrade:

- entrance 1 - Boulevard Morland - Mairie de Paris - Préfecture de Paris, decorated with a Dervaux candelabrum, leading to boulevard Henri-IV at place du Père-Teilhard-de-Chardin, between rue de Sully and Boulevard Morland;
- entrance 2 - Rue de Sully located to the right of the Célestins barracks at no. 12 boulevard Henri-IV, at the corner with rue de Sully;
- entrance 3 - Boulevard Henri-IV, also equipped with a Dervaux mast located opposite no. 2 of the Quai des Célestins, at the corner with Rue du Petit-Musc and Boulevard Henri-IV;
- entrance 4 - Quai des Célestins comprising two entrances established back-to-back, leading to the right of no. 10, 12 and 14 of this same Quai.

=== Station layout ===
Street Level

B1	Connecting level

Line 7 platforms	Side platform, doors will open on the right
Line 7 platforms	Southbound	← toward Villejuif–Louis Aragon or Mairie d'Ivry (Jussieu)
Line 7 platforms	Northbound	toward La Courneuve–8 mai 1945 (Pont Marie) →
Line 7 platforms	Side platform, doors will open on the right

== Gallery ==
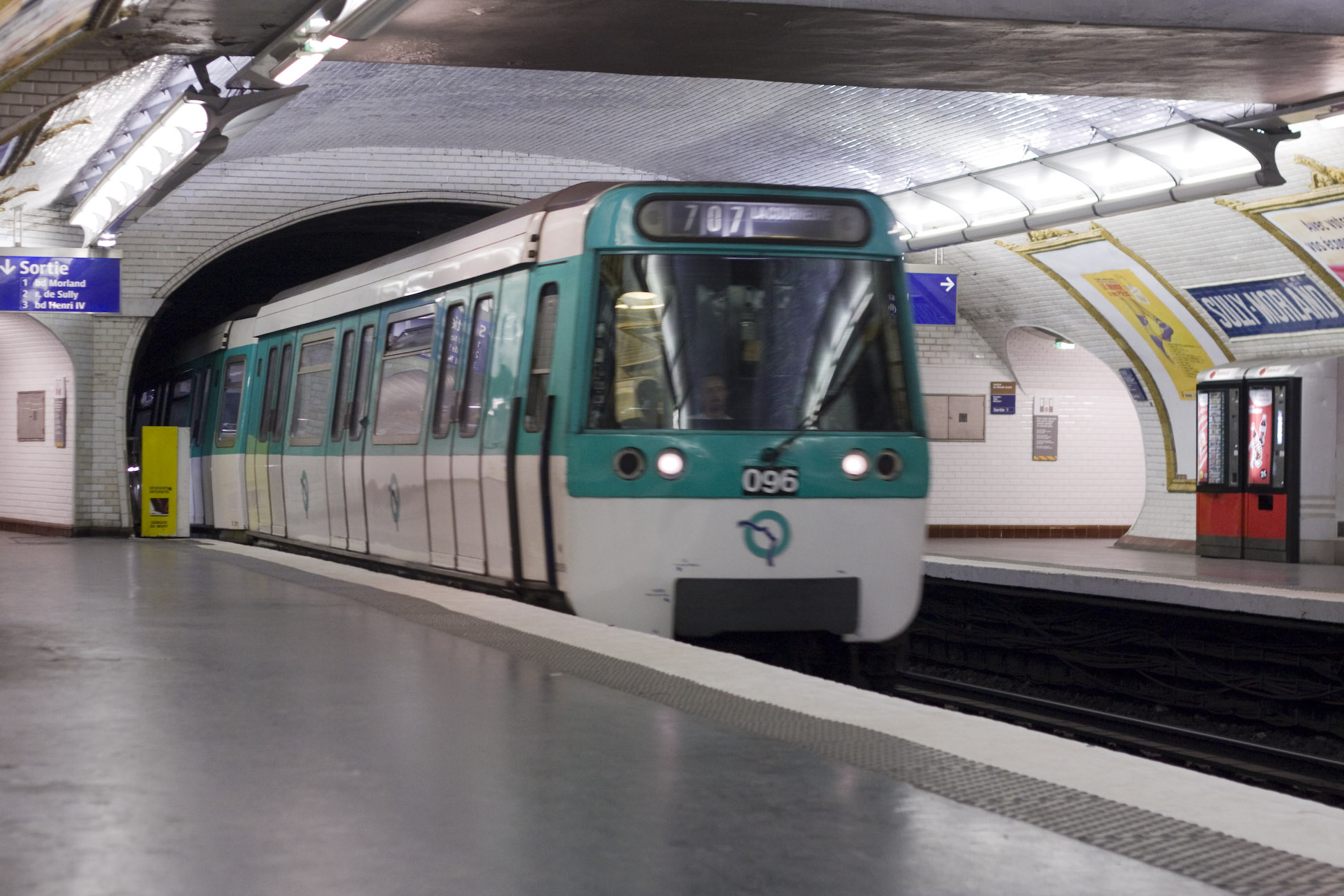
MF 77 rolling stock on Line 7 at Sully–Morland
