= Trocadéro Fountain =

A monumental fountain in the Trocadéro Gardens below the Palais de Chaillot in Paris

- Fontaine du Trocadéro (French), Fontaine de Varsovie (French)
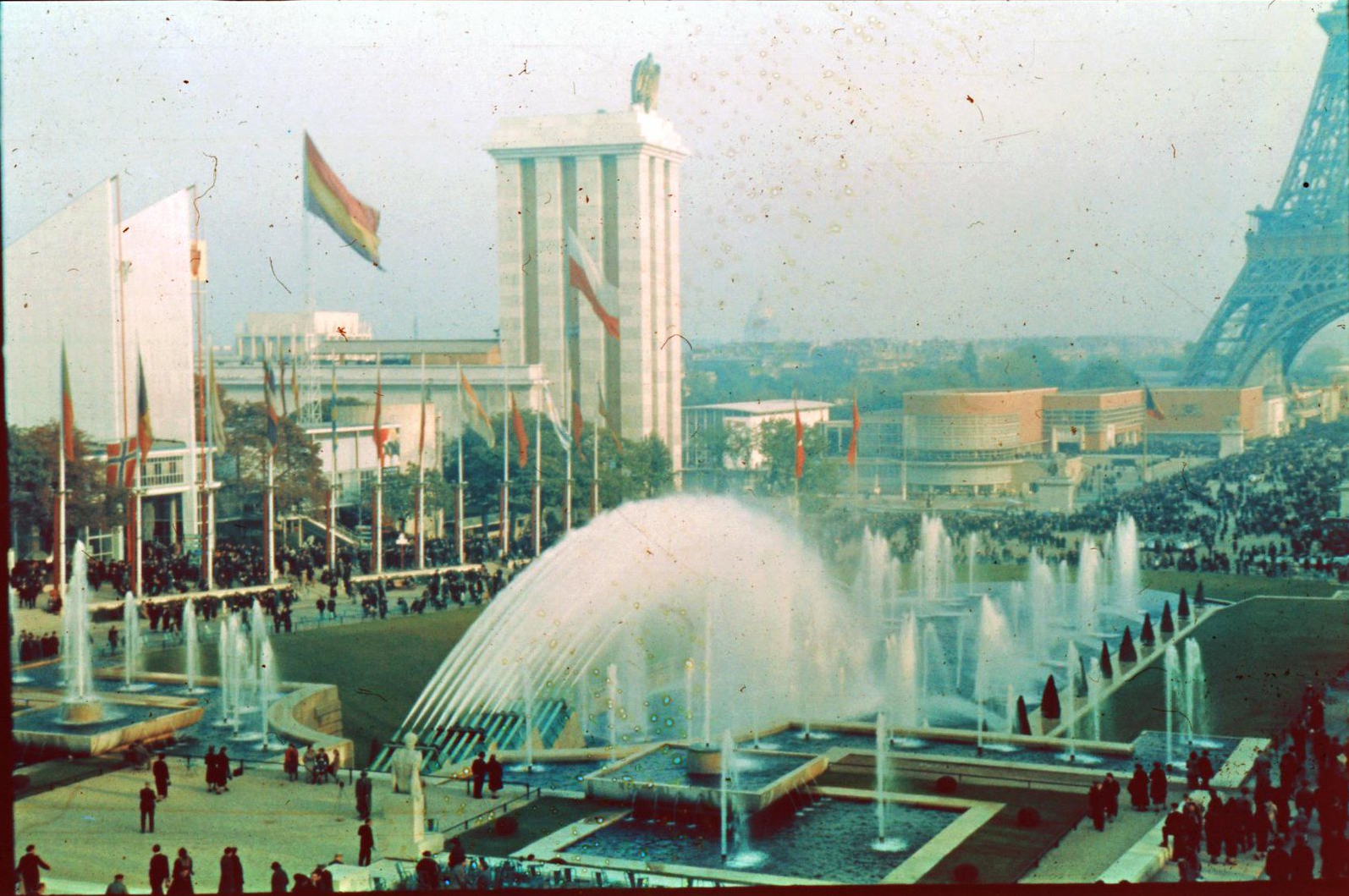
- The Trocadéro Fountain during the 1937 International Exposition in Paris.
- Artist: Roger-Henri Expert, Paul Maître, Adolphe Thiers (architects); Daniel-Joseph Bacqué, Léon-Ernest Drivier (sculptors)
- Year: 1937
- Completion date: 25 May 1937
- Medium: Reinforced concrete, water, bronze sculptures
- Subject: Monumental fountain with water features and sculptures
- Dimensions: Largest fountain in Paris; features 20 water cannons (50 m range), 56 jets (7 m), 12 columns (7 m)
- Condition: Operational
- Location: Paris, France; 48°51′40″N 2°17′24″E
- Owner: City of Paris
- Website: www.paris.fr/lieux/jardins-du-trocadero-1803

The Trocadéro Fountain, also known as the Warsaw Fountain, is a fountain located in the Trocadéro Gardens, situated below the Palais de Chaillot in the 16th arrondissement of Paris, France.

The fountain's footprint (lawns and basins) forms an island bordered by four public roads: Place de Varsovie (named in 1928), Avenue Albert Ier de Monaco (named in 1932), Avenue Hussein Ier de Jordanie (named in 1999), and Avenue Gustave V de Suède (named in 1951).

== History ==
=== The original fountain ===
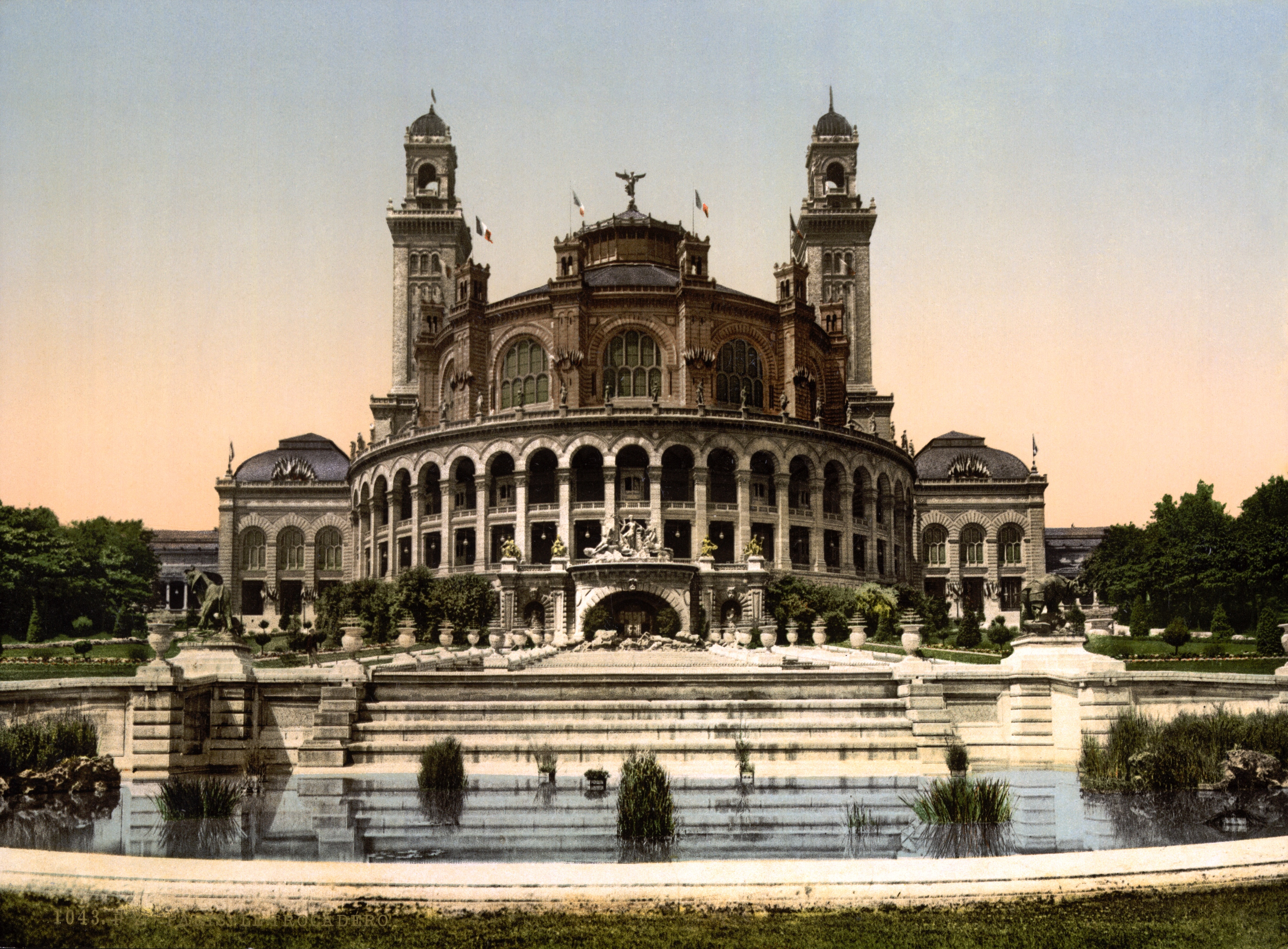
The original fountain in front of the former Trocadéro Palace (1878–1935).

Before the current fountain, an earlier one stood in its place, designed as a cascade by architect Gabriel Davioud for the 1878 Universal Exposition, alongside the construction of the former Trocadéro Palace.

This fountain featured bronze mascarons crafted by Auguste Rodin. Seven of these were salvaged and reinstalled at the Parc de Sceaux, while others were placed on the retaining wall of the terrace at the Jardin des Serres d'Auteuil. Plaster models of two mascarons are preserved at the Musée des Arts Décoratifs, in Paris.

Surrounding the fountain were four bronze sculptures: Horse with Harrow by Pierre Louis Rouillard, Young Elephant Trapped by Emmanuel Frémiet, The Rhinoceros by Henri-Alfred Jacquemart, and The Ox by Auguste Cain. Today, the first three are located in Paris in front of the Musée d'Orsay, while the last is in Nîmes.

The original fountain was demolished in 1935 to make way for its successor.

=== The 1937 fountain ===
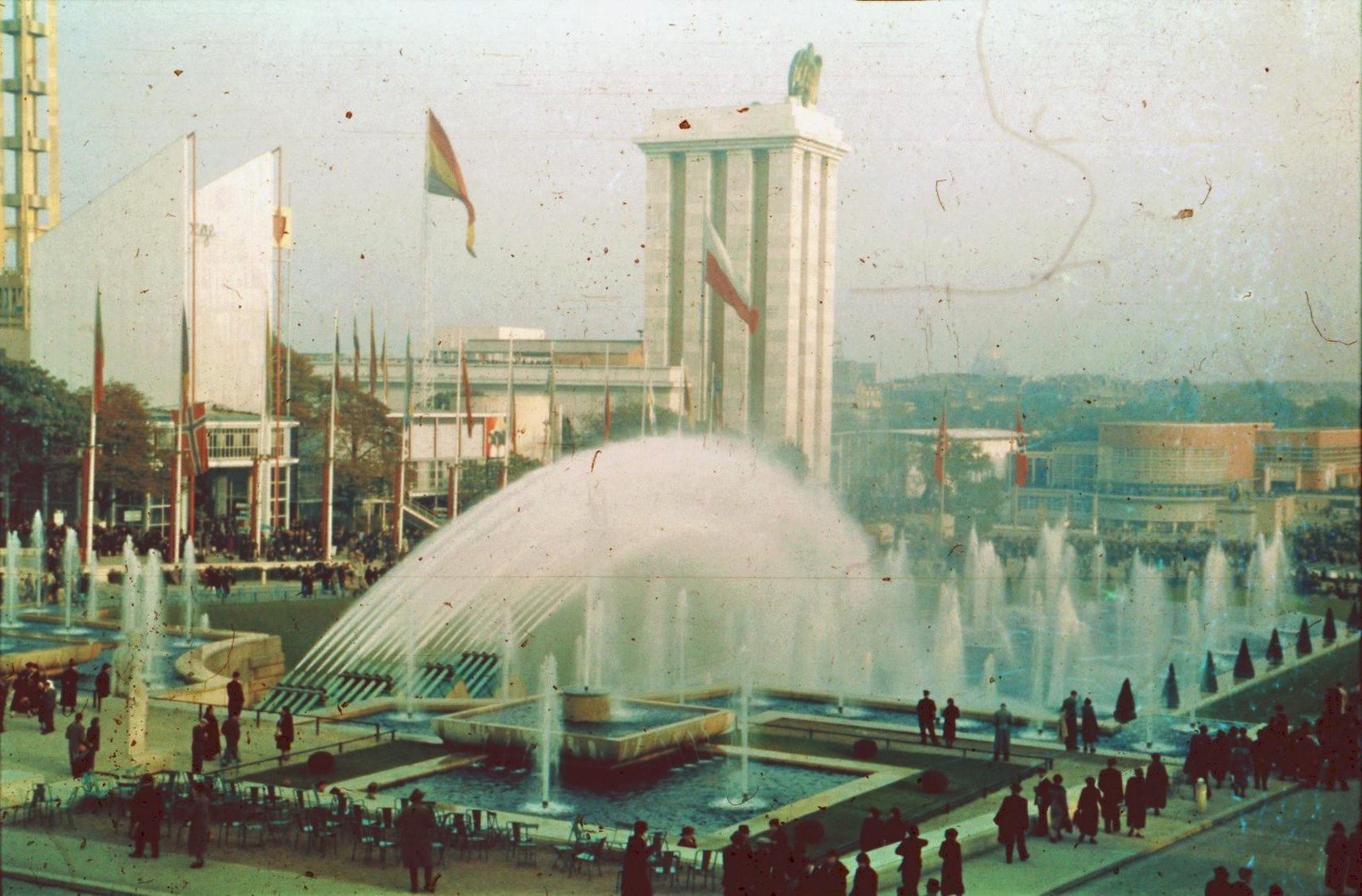
The 1937 Universal Exposition in Paris, showcasing the Warsaw Fountain.

Constructed for the 1937 International Exposition, the current fountain was part of a major redevelopment of the area, including the replacement of the old Trocadéro Palace with the Palais de Chaillot and a redesign of the Trocadéro Gardens. The architects were Roger-Henri Expert, Paul Maître, and Adolphe Thiers, with sculptors Daniel-Joseph Bacqué and Léon-Ernest Drivier contributing to its design. As the largest fountain in Paris, it features "an impressive array of twenty angled water cannons, arranged in four groups of five, aimed toward the Eiffel Tower with a 50-meter range, complemented by fifty-six 4-meter water jets and twelve 7-meter columns, all powered by a 1,000-horsepower system." During the 1937 exposition, 530 electric projectors illuminated the fountain and its surroundings for a spectacular nighttime display.

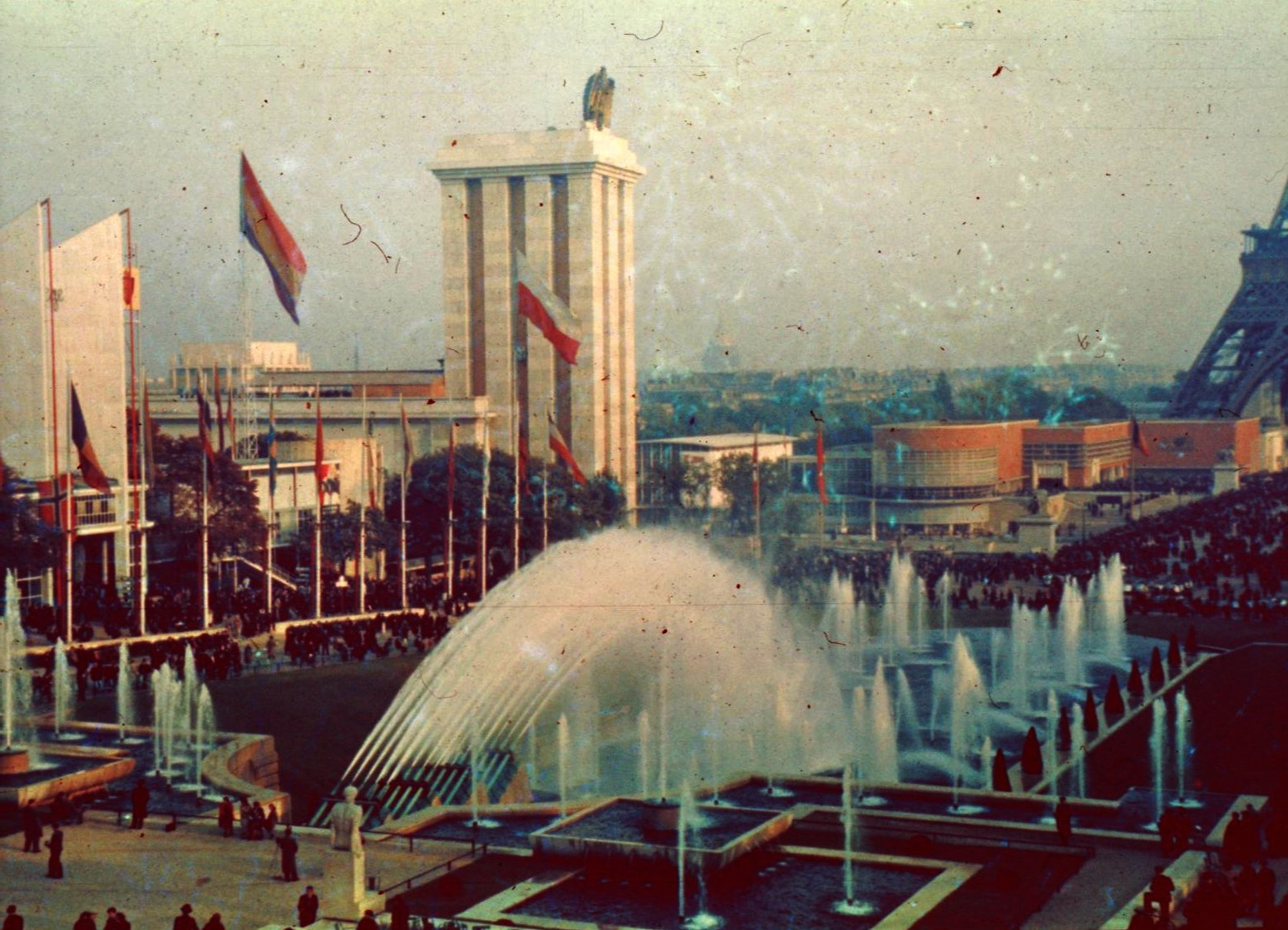
The 1937 fountain.

In winter, when frozen, the fountain’s surface has been used for ice skating and sliding.

The fountain has appeared in popular media, including the music video for Laurent Voulzy’s Rockollection (1977) and a scene in Lisa Azuelos’s film LOL (Laughing Out Loud) (2012). In 1989, to mark the centennial of the Eiffel Tower and the bicentennial of the French Revolution, Mireille Mathieu performed La Marseillaise with the French Army Choir in front of the fountain, broadcast live on French television.

During the summer of 2021, the Trocadéro Gardens were temporarily reconfigured to host a fan zone for the 2020 Summer Olympics in Tokyo. The fountain was drained and transformed into a stadium-like space. The site is accessible via Line 6 and Line 9 at the Trocadéro station.

==== Description ====
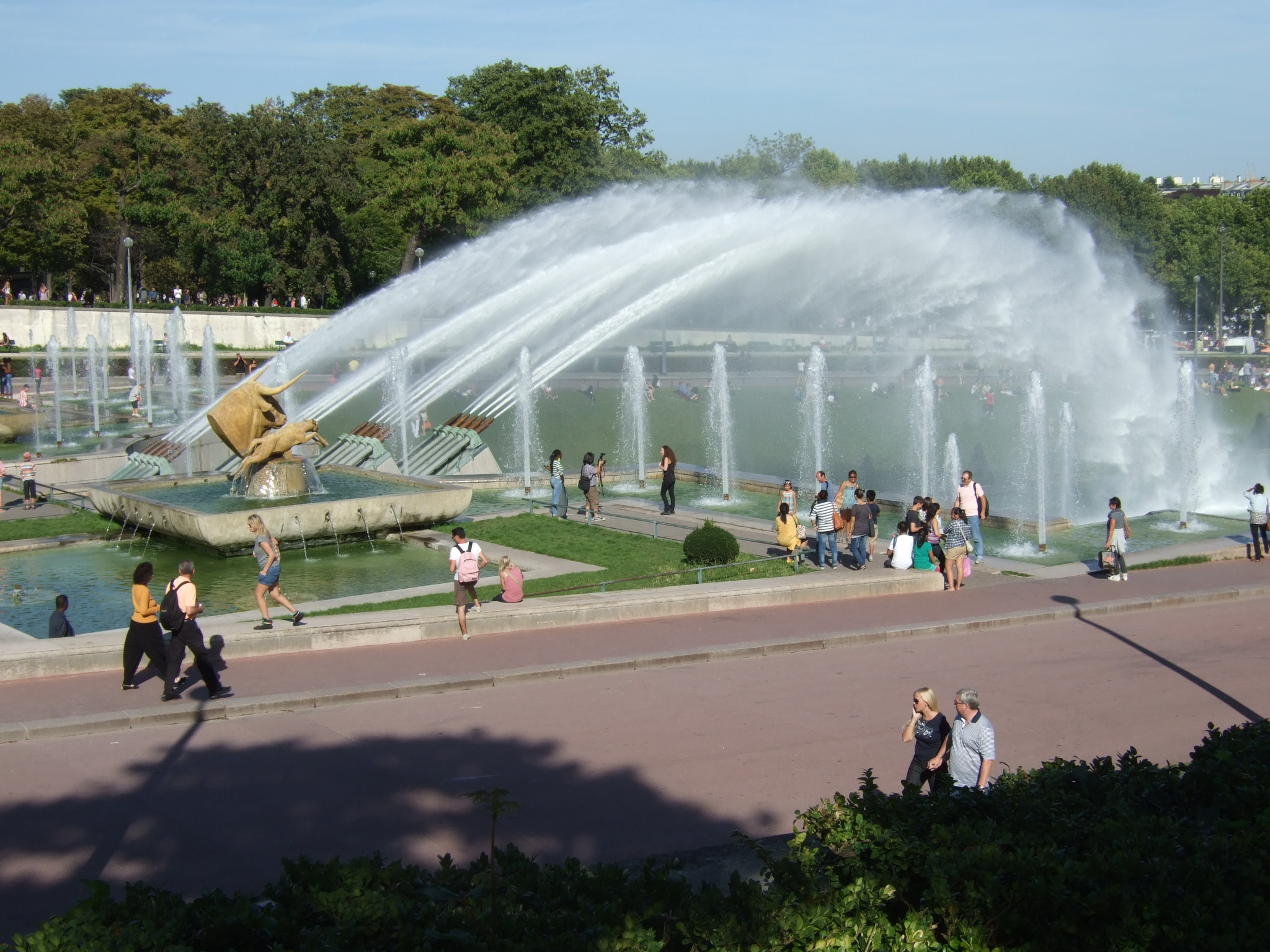
View of the fountain in 2011.

The current Trocadéro Fountain consists of a rectangular basin "topped by a series of symmetrical smaller basins operating in a closed circuit." It features twenty 50-meter-range angled water cannons, fifty-six 7-meter jets, and twelve 7-meter columns, collectively propelling 5,700 liters of water per second.

Flanking the fountain near the Seine are two freestanding sculptures: The Joy of Life by Léon-Ernest Drivier and Youth by Pierre-Marie Poisson. Additional sculptures adorn the basins, including one of horses and a dog by Georges Guyot and another of a bull and deer by Paul Jouve. Two statues, Man by Pierre Traverse and Woman by Daniel Bacqué, overlook the structure. The fountain is equipped with nighttime lighting.

== See also ==
- List of fountains in the 16th arrondissement of Paris
- List of fountains in Paris
- Jardins du Trocadéro
- Trocadéro district
- Trocadéro Palace
- Palais de Chaillot

== Bibliography ==
- Barozzi, Jacques (2010). Paris de fontaine en fontaine [Paris from Fountain to Fountain] (in French). Paris: Éditions Parigramme, Compagnie parisienne du livre. p. 106. ISBN 978-2-84096-625-8.
