= Trocadéro, Paris =

Site of the Palais de Chaillot in Paris, France

Coordinates: 48°51′46″N 2°17′14″E

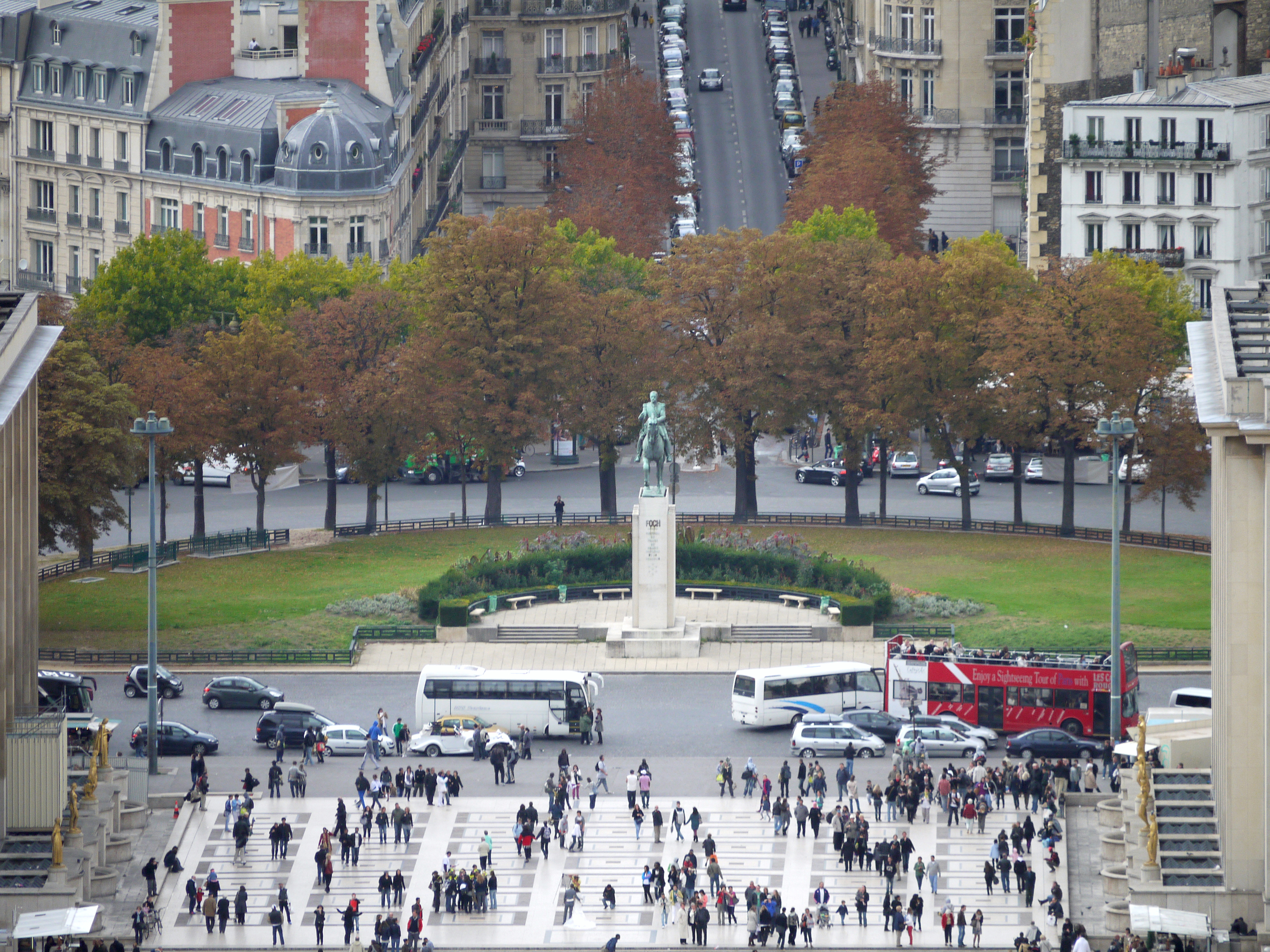
Place du Trocadéro et du 11 Novembre

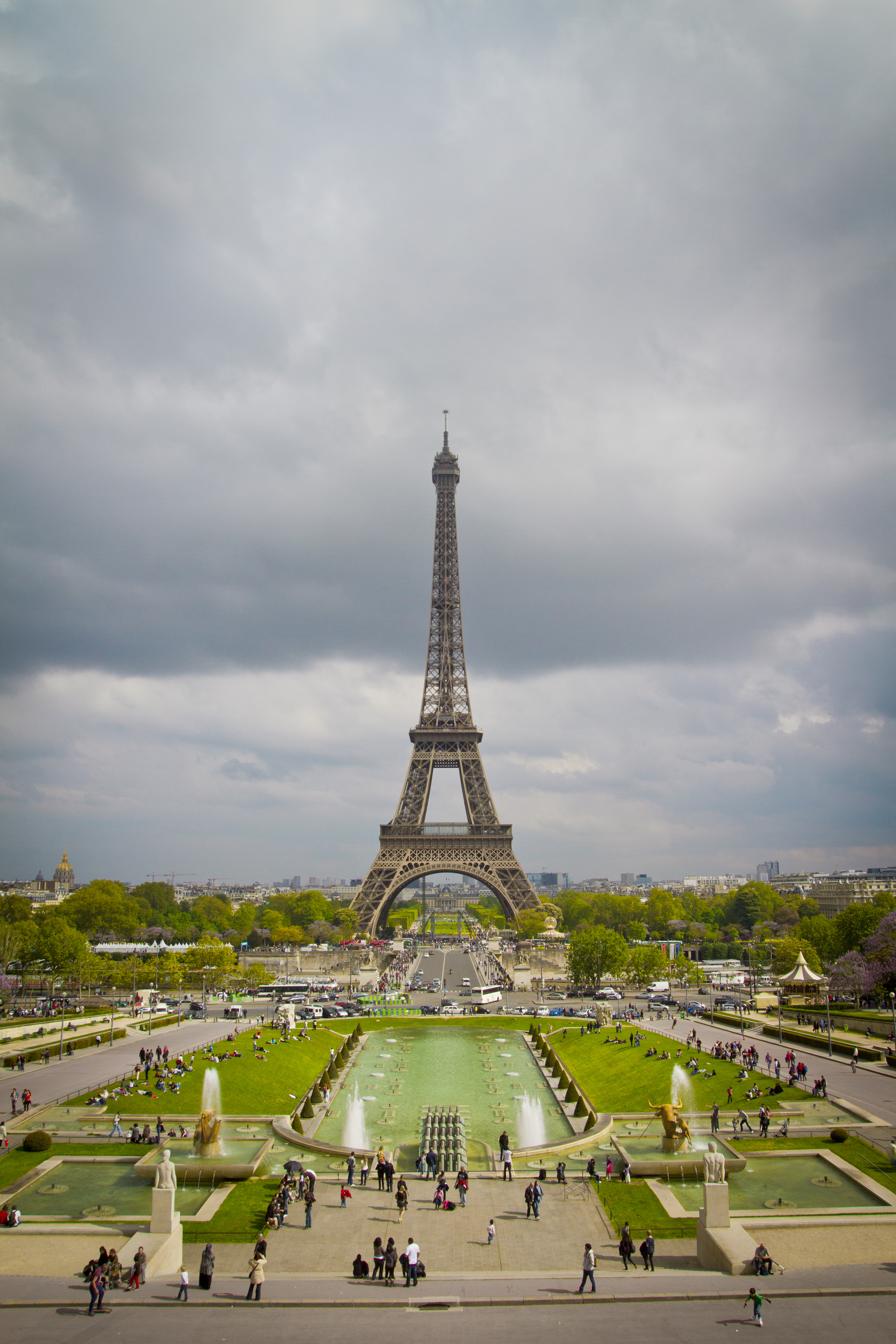
The Fontaines de Chaillot and Eiffel Tower seen from the Place du Trocadéro

The Trocadéro (pronounced [tʁɔkadeʁo]), site of the Palais de Chaillot, is an area of Paris, France, in the 16th arrondissement, across the Seine from the Eiffel Tower. It is also the name of the 1878 Trocadéro Palace which was demolished in 1937 to make way for the Palais de Chaillot. The hill of the Trocadéro is the hill of Chaillot, a former village.

== Origin of the name ==
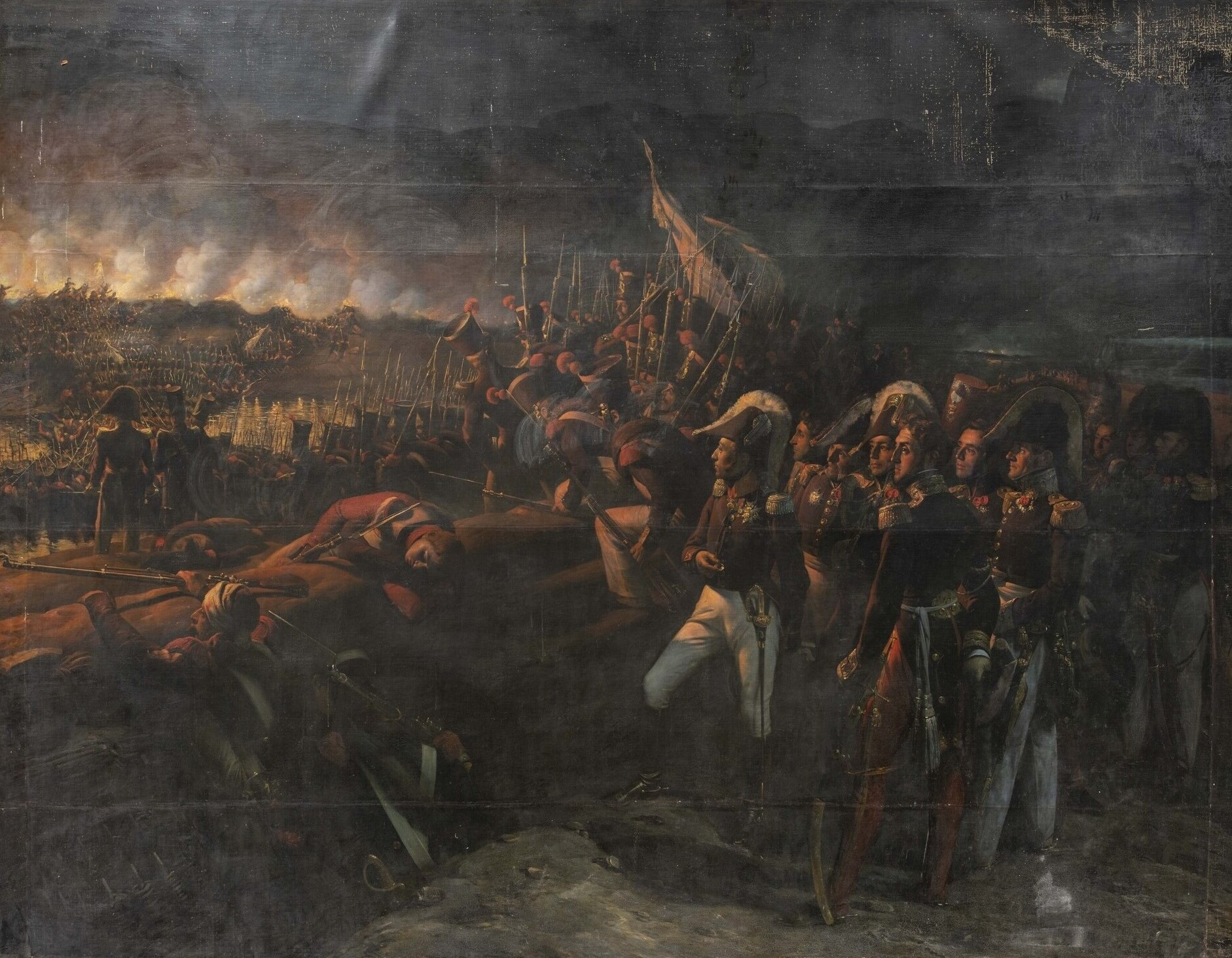
Battle of Trocadero, 31 August 1823

The place was named in honour of the Battle of Trocadero, in which the fortified Isla del Trocadero, in southern Spain, was captured by French forces led by the Duc d'Angoulême, son of the future King of France, Charles X, on 31 August 1823. France had intervened on behalf of King Ferdinand VII of Spain, whose rule was contested by a liberal rebellion. After the battle, the Spanish Bourbon Ferdinand VII was restored to the throne of Spain.

François-René de Chateaubriand said "To stride across the lands of Spain at one go, to succeed there, where Bonaparte had failed, to triumph on that same soil where the arms of the fantastic man suffered reverses, to do in six months what he couldn't do in seven years, that was truly prodigious!"

Nowadays the square is officially named Place du Trocadéro et (and) du 11 Novembre (for the WWI armistice), although it is usually simply called the Place du Trocadéro.

== Palais du Trocadéro ==
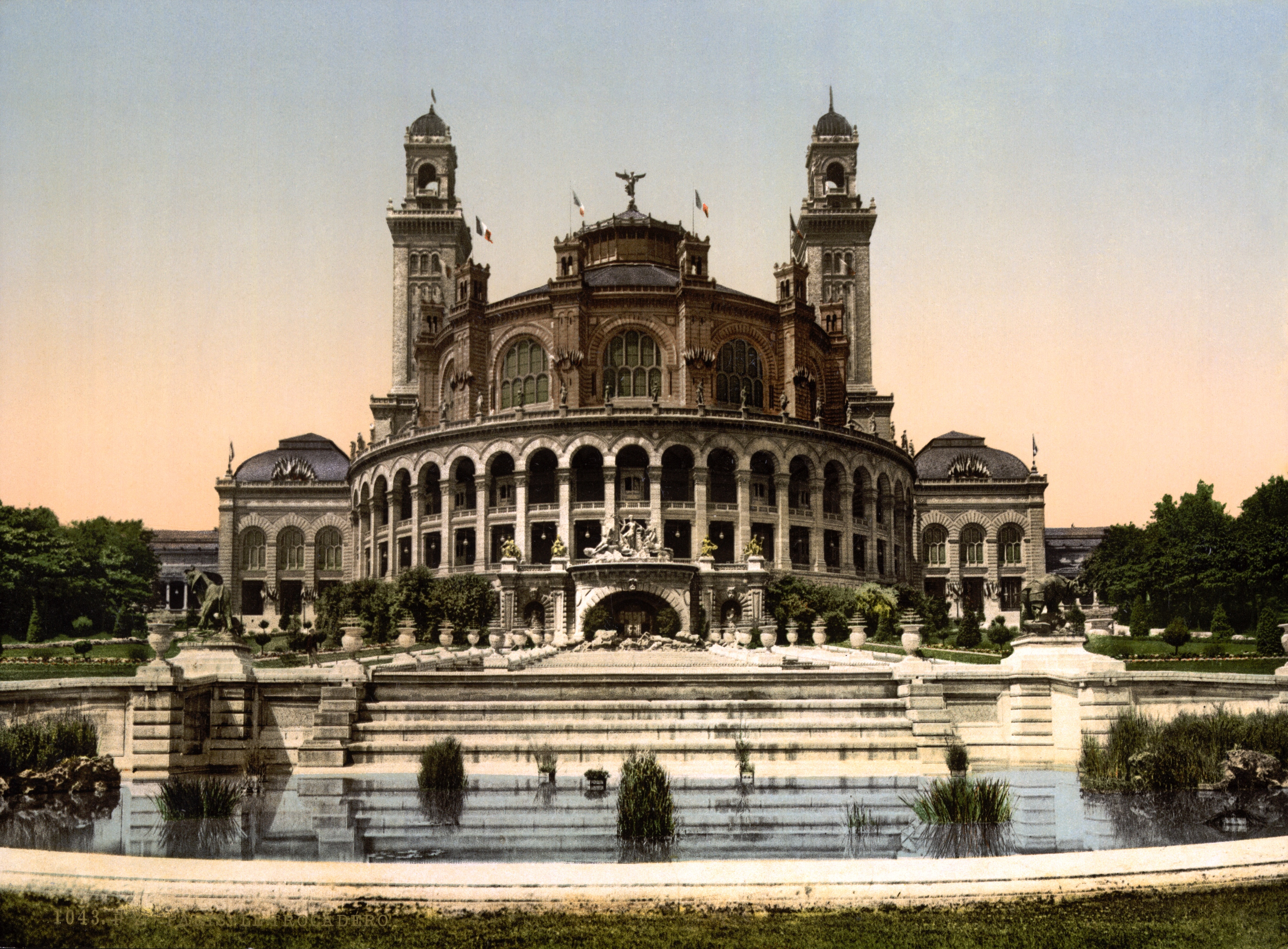
The Palais du Trocadéro in the late 19th century

The hill of Chaillot was first arranged for the 1867 World's Fair. For the 1878 World's Fair, the (old) Palais du Trocadéro (1878–1936) was built here (where meetings of international organizations could be held during the fair). The palace's form was that of a large concert hall with two wings and two towers; its style was a mixture of exotic and historical references, generally called "Moorish" but with some Byzantine elements. The architect was Gabriel Davioud.

The concert hall contained a large organ built by Aristide Cavaillé-Coll; the first large organ to be installed in a concert hall in France (it has since been modified twice, and eventually moved in 1977 to the Auditorium Maurice Ravel in Lyon, where it is still in use today.) The organ was inaugurated during the 1878 World Fair with a concert in which Charles Marie Widor played the premiere of his Symphony for Organ No. 6. The building proved unpopular, but the cost expended in its construction delayed its replacement for nearly fifty years.

Below the building in the space left by former underground quarries, a large aquarium was built to contain fish of French rivers. It was renovated in 1937 but closed again for renovation from 1985 until 22 May 2006. The space between the palais and the Seine is set with gardens, designed by Jean-Charles Adolphe Alphand, and an array of fountains.

Within its garden, the old palace contained two large animal statues, of a rhinoceros and an elephant, which were removed and stored during the demolition of the old Trocadero palace, and have been located next to the entrance of the Musée d'Orsay since 1986.

== Palais de Chaillot ==
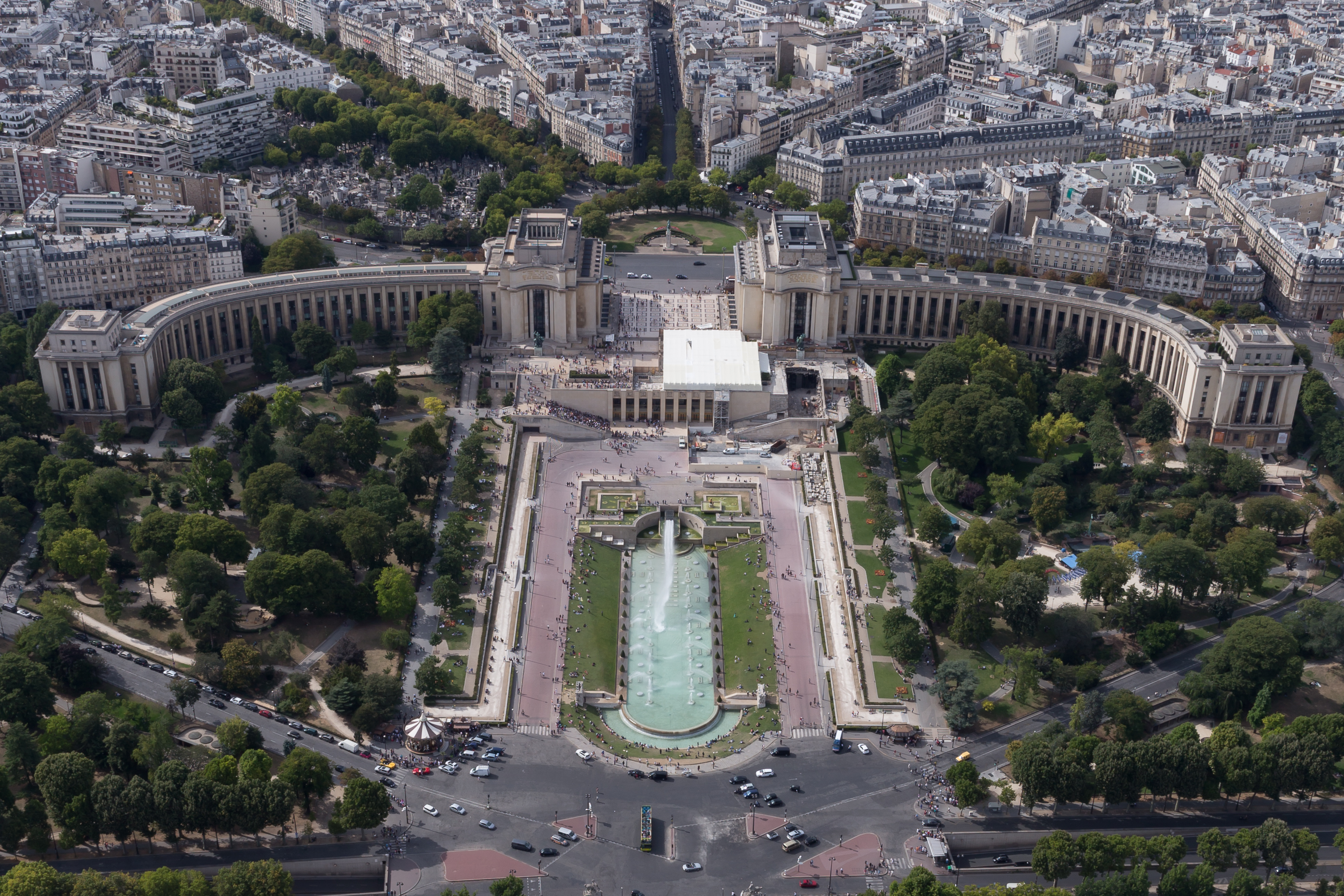
View of the Palais de Chaillot and the Jardins du Trocadéro from the Eiffel Tower in 2015

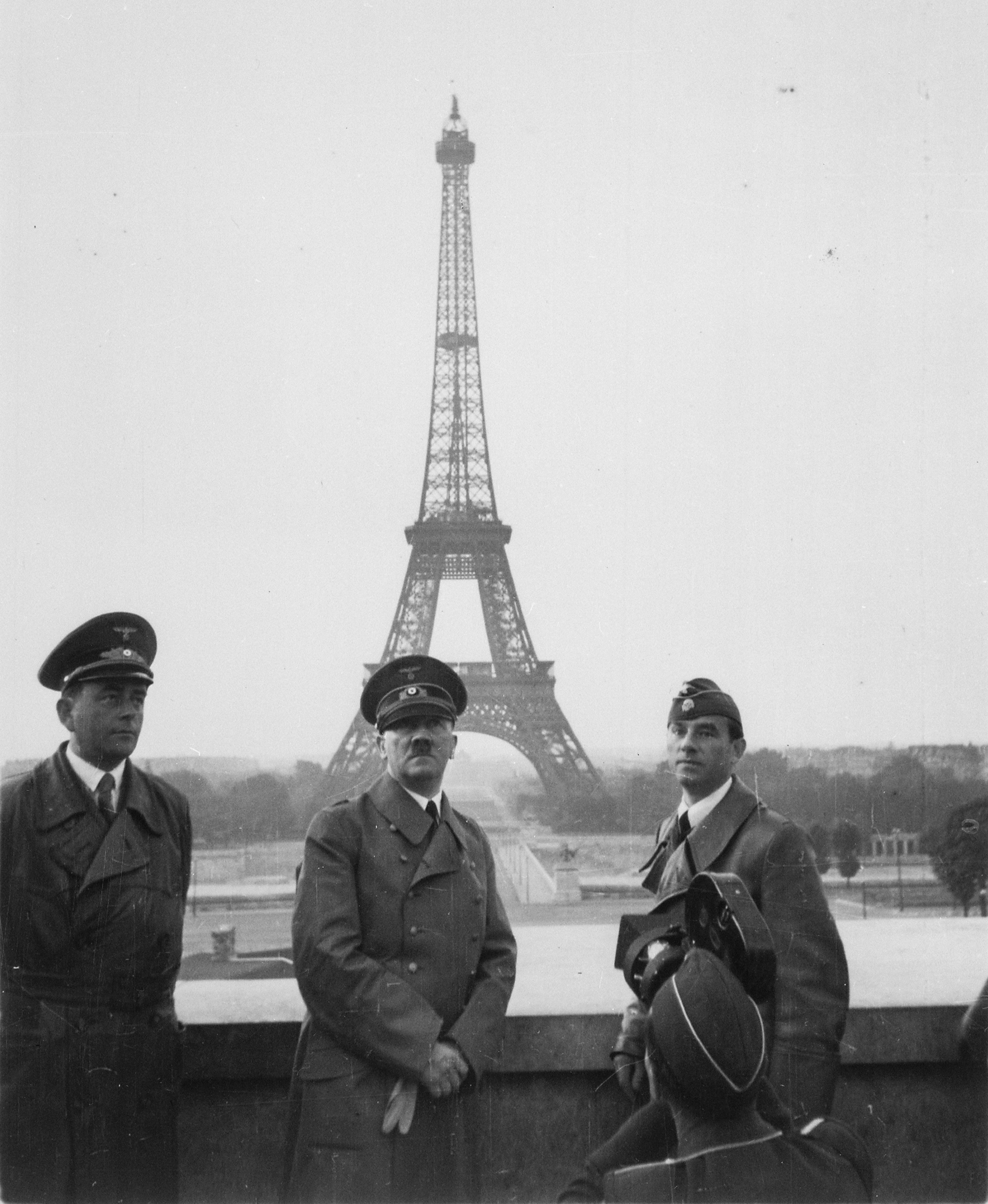
German leader Adolf Hitler visiting the Trocadéro with Albert Speer (left) and sculptor Arno Breker (right) on 23 June 1940 during the Battle of France

For the Exposition Internationale of 1937, the old Palais du Trocadéro was partly demolished and partly rebuilt and the Palais de Chaillot now tops the hill. It was designed in classicizing "moderne" style by architects Louis-Hippolyte Boileau, Jacques Carlu and Léon Azéma. Like the old palais, the Palais de Chaillot features two wings shaped to form a wide arc; reclad and expanded, these wings and the pair of central pavilions are the only remaining portion of the former building. However, unlike the old palais, the wings are independent buildings and there is no central element to connect them: instead, a wide esplanade leaves an open view from the place du Trocadéro to the Eiffel Tower and beyond.

The buildings are decorated with quotations by Paul Valéry, and sculptural groups at the attic level by Raymond Delamarre, Carlo Sarrabezolles and Alfred Bottiau. The eight gilded figures on the terrace of the Rights of Man are attributed to the sculptors Alexandre Descatoire, Marcel Gimond, Jean Paris dit Pryas, Paul Cornet, Lucien Brasseur, Robert Couturier, Paul Niclausse, and Félix-Alexandre Desruelles.

The buildings now house a number of museums:

- the Musée national de la Marine (naval museum) and the Musée de l'Homme (ethnology) in the southern (Passy) wing.
- the Cité de l'Architecture et du Patrimoine, including the Musée national des Monuments Français, in the eastern (Paris) wing, from which one also enters the Théâtre national de Chaillot, a theater below the esplanade.

It was on the front terrace of the palace that Adolf Hitler was pictured during his short tour of the city in 1940, with the Eiffel Tower in the background. This became an iconic image of the Second World War. It is in the Palais de Chaillot that the United Nations General Assembly adopted the Universal Declaration of Human Rights on 10 December 1948. This event is now commemorated by a stone, and the esplanade is known as the esplanade des droits de l'homme (English: "Esplanade of Human Rights"). The Palais de Chaillot was also the initial headquarters of NATO, while the "Palais de l'OTAN" (now Université Paris Dauphine) was being built.

== Jardins du Trocadéro ==
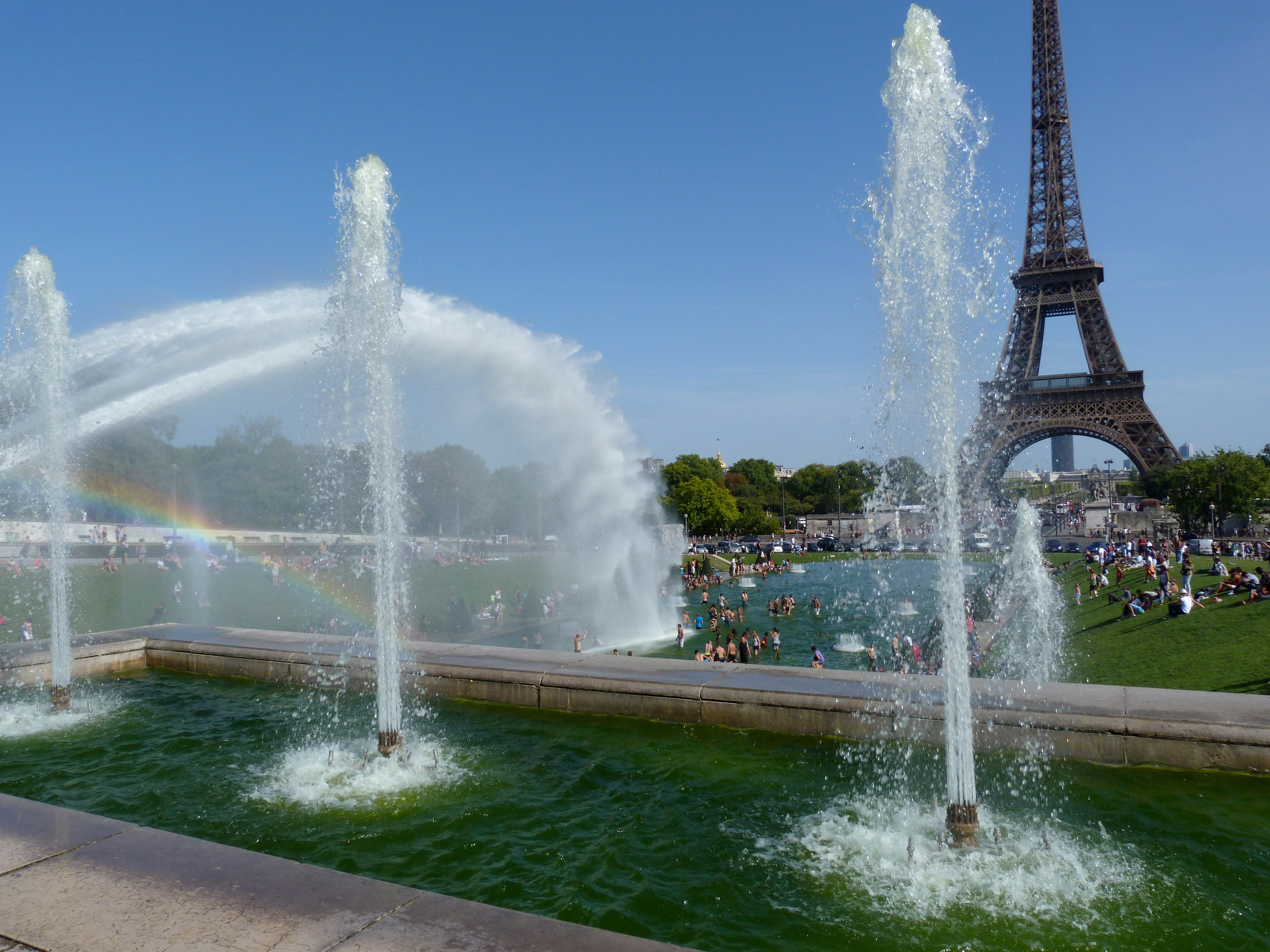
Jardins du Trocadéro with the Eiffel Tower in the background

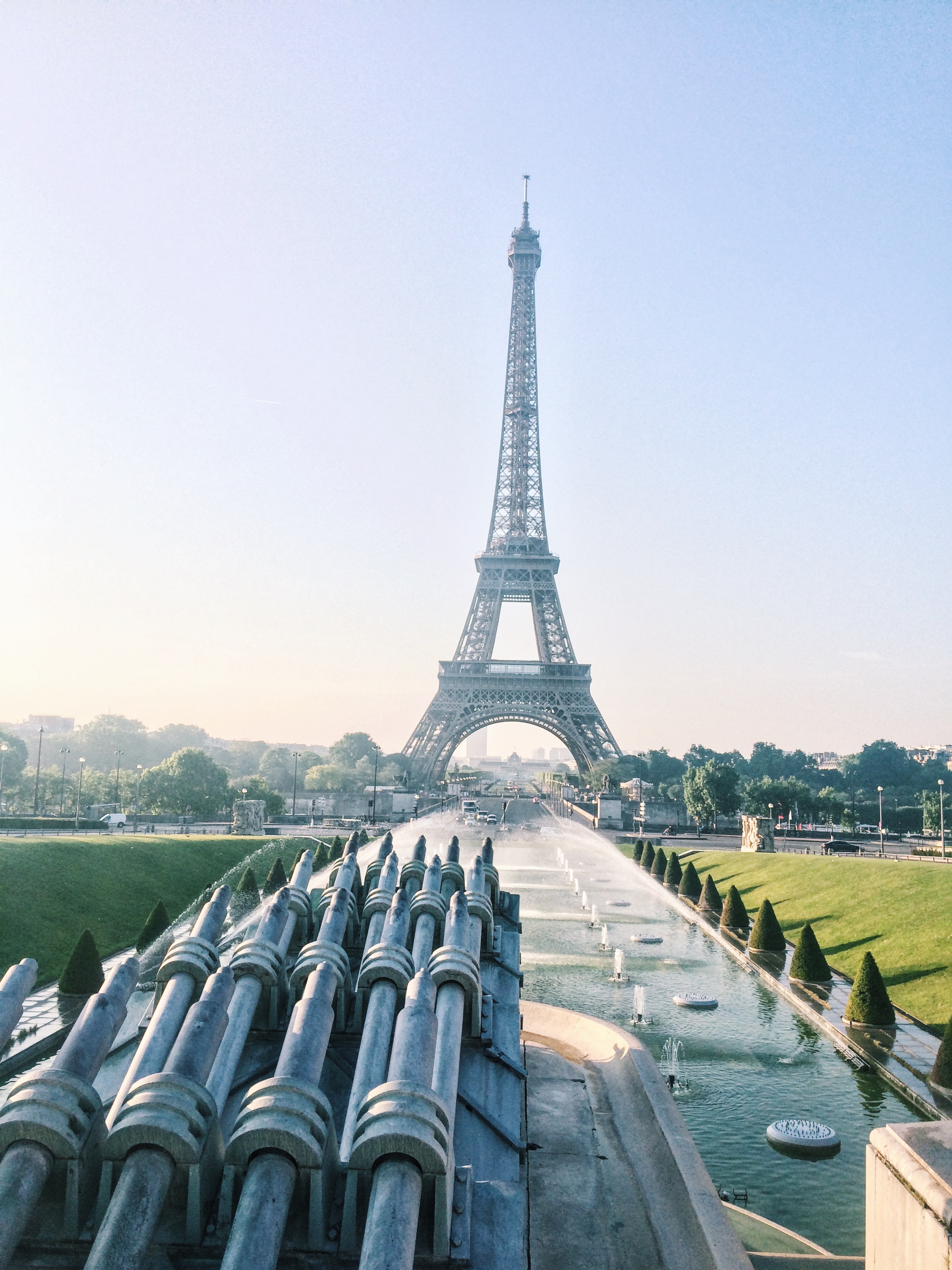
View of the Eiffel Tower from the Trocadéro

The Jardins du Trocadéro occupy the open space bounded to the northwest by the wings of the Palais de Chaillot and to the southeast by the Seine and the Pont d'Iéna.

The present garden has an area of 93,930 square metres (23.21 acres) and was created for the Exposition Internationale des Arts et Techniques dans la Vie Moderne (1937), on the design of architect Roger-Henri Expert. The entire site was formerly the garden of the old Palais du Trocadéro, laid out by Jean-Charles Adolphe Alphand.

== Others ==
Five avenues originate in the Trocadéro: the Avenue Henri-Martin, which links the Trocadéro with the Porte de la Muette and passes in front of the Lycée Janson de Sailly (Janson de Sailly secondary school); the Avenue Paul Doumer, which also approaches the Muette; the Avenue d'Eylau, which goes to the Mexico Plaza; the Avenue Kléber, which goes to the Place Charles de Gaulle; and the Avenue du Président Wilson, which goes to the Pont de l'Alma and the Seine.

There is a large municipal library (the Germaine Tillion Library, named after the resistance member and ethnologist) near (to the west of) the Trocadéro's square.

The high retaining walls of the Trocadero cemetery (Cimetière de Passy) were constructed by the French industrialist François Coignet.

== Education ==
The Institut Culturel Franco-Japonais – École Japonaise de Paris opened at the Trocadéro in 1973. It moved to its current location at Montigny-le-Bretonneux in 1990.

== Access ==
The nearest Paris Metro station is Trocadéro, served by lines 6 and 9.

== Trocadéro today ==
Trocadéro is a popular tourist destination to take pictures of the Eiffel Tower. The Place du Trocadéro et du 11 Novembre is also where the Paris Saint-Germain F.C. celebrates its French championships victories and where sometimes reporters from the US come to show the evidence of their presence in the French territory.

== See also ==
- Antoine Sartorio
- Trocadéro Palace
- Trocadéro Fountain
- Trocadéro Esplanade
