= Théâtre national de Chaillot =

National Theatre in Paris (1937)

- Théâtre National Populaire
- Théâtre National de Chaillot
- Interactive map of Théâtre national de Chaillot
- Address: 1 Place du Trocadéro, 16th Paris; France
- Coordinates: 48.8623053°N 2.2819822°E
- Capacity: Salle Jean-Vilar: 1250; Salle Gémier: 420
- Type: contemporary dance classical Music

Construction
- Opened: 1937
- Architects: Édouard Niermans; Jean Niermans

Website
- www.theatre-chaillot.fr

The Théâtre national de Chaillot (French pronunciation: [teɑtʁ nɑsjɔnal d(ə) ʃajo]; "Chaillot National Theatre") is a theatre located in the Palais de Chaillot at 1, Place du Trocadéro, in the 16th arrondissement of Paris. Close by the Eiffel Tower and the Trocadéro Gardens—the Théâtre de Chaillot is among the largest concert halls in Paris. It has long been synonymous with popular theatre and is especially associated with stars such as Jean Vilar and Antoine Vitez. In 1975 the French Ministry of Culture designated it as one of the four national theatres of Paris.

== History ==
The Théâtre national de Chaillot was built between 1934 and 1937 by the brothers Jean and Édouard Niermans for the Paris Exhibition of 1937 on the site of the former Trocadéro Palace, itself an elaborate structure built for the Paris World's Fair of 1878. Starting in 1973 the interior of the theatre was completely renovated by the team of Valentine Fabre and John Perrottet and now houses a theatre school and three theatre venues: the Salle-Jean Vilar with 1250 seats, the Salle Gémier with 420 seats, and an 80-seat studio dedicated to small productions and avant-garde shows.

In 2007, France's Ministry for Culture under Christine Albanel directed the Théâtre national de Chaillot to promote contemporary dance—especially the work of French choreographers. This announcement was greeted by controversy and outright hostility in some quarters. Nevertheless, according to the Paris convention and visitors bureau, the Chaillot is dedicated to a presenting world class international dance, theatre, circus and visual arts—to being "a theatre that welcomes art in all its diversity". It regularly hosts international dance companies such as The Forsythe Company, the Royal Swedish Ballet, and the Irish troop Colin Dunne.

The Chaillot is a frequent venue of au courant fashion shows featuring top designers such as Giorgio Armani, Elie Saab, and Claude Montana.

== Directors ==
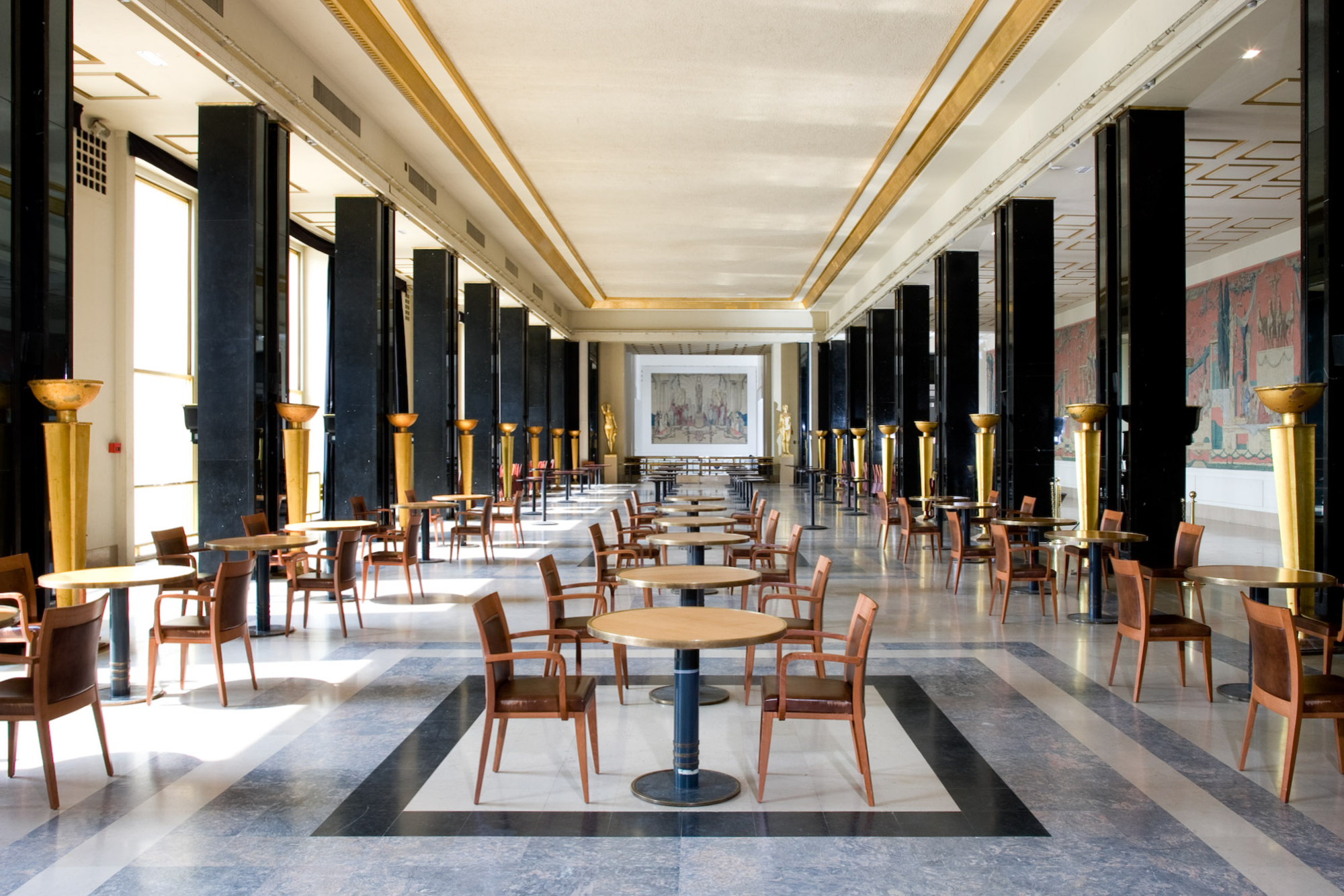
The Grand Foyer of the Théâtre National de Chaillot

Directors of the old theatre (demolished in 1935):

- 1920–1933 Firmin Gemier
- 1933–1935 Albert Fourtier

Directors of the new theatre (rebuilt in 1937):

- 1938–1939 Paul Abram
- 1941–1951 Pierre Aldebert
- 1951–1963 Jean Vilar
- 1963–1972 Georges Wilson
- 1973–1974 Jack Lang
- 1974–1981 Andre-Louis Périnetti
- 1981–1988 Antoine Vitez
- 1988–2000 Jérôme Savary
- 2000–2008 Ariel Goldenberg
- 2008–2011 Jose Montalvo and Dominique Hervieu
- 2011–present Didier Deschamps
