= Hôtel de Ville, Reims =

Town hall in Reims, France

Hôtel de Ville
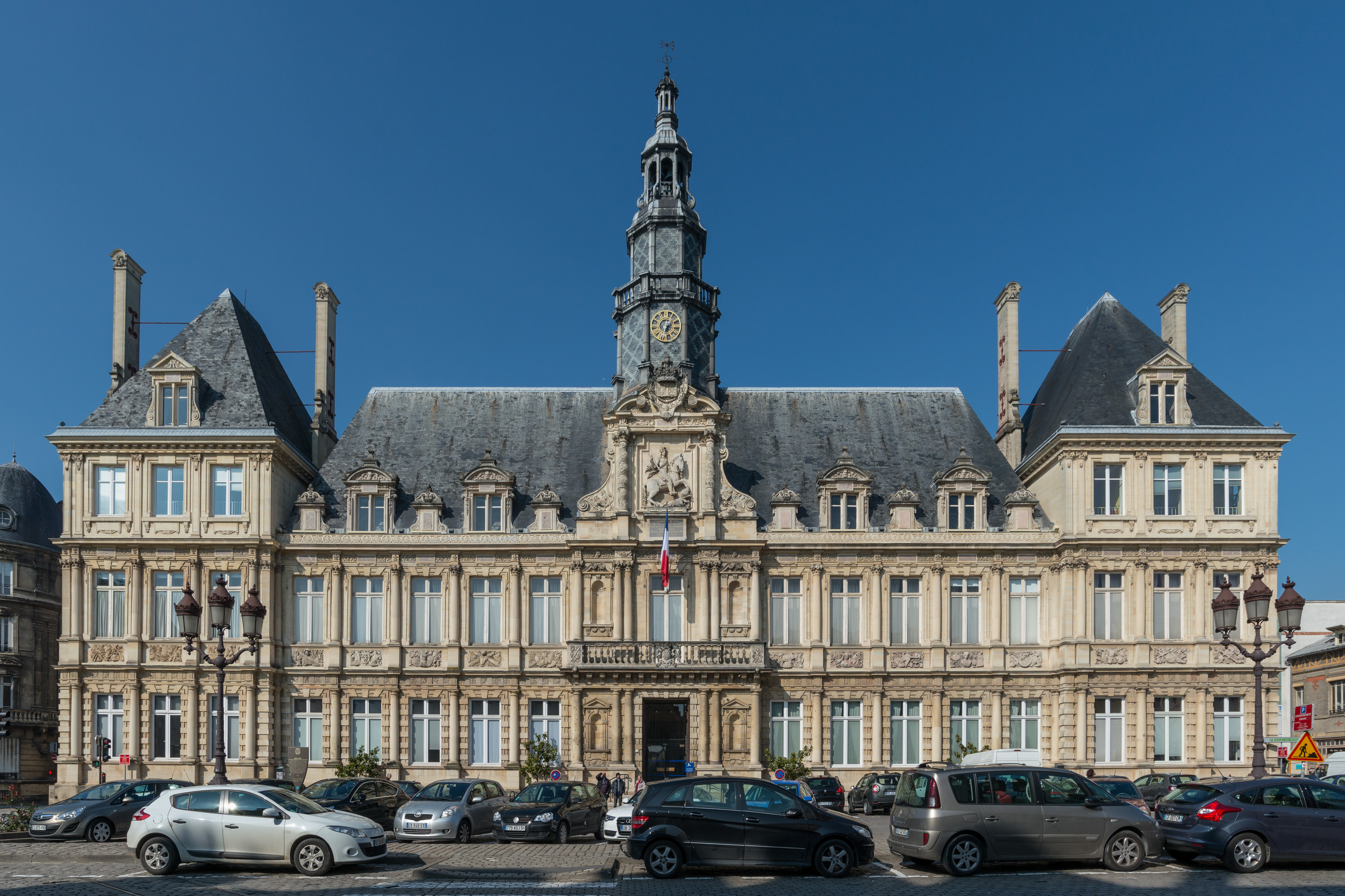
- Main frontage of the Hôtel de Ville in March 2014

General information
- Type: City hall
- Architectural style: Renaissance Revival style
- Location: Reims, France
- Coordinates: 49.25801°N 4.03171°E
- Completed: 1628; 1825 (expansion); 1928 (reconstruction)

Design and construction
- Architect: Jean Bonhomme

Monument historique
- Official name: Hôtel de ville
- Type: Inscrit
- Designated: 1862
- Reference no.: PA00078795

The Hôtel de Ville (French pronunciation: [otɛl də vil], City Hall) is the town hall in Reims, France. It was designated a monument historique by the French government in 1862.

== History ==
After previously meeting at different sites, the town council bought a building on the Place du Marché-aux-Chevaux for its meeting place in 1499. This building soon became too small, but a new one could not be built until a 22,000 livre debt was repaid to the city by Charles, Duke of Guise.

Nicolas Lespagnol, the city's lieutenant, laid the foundation stone for the new building on 18 June 1627. It was constructed in ashlar stone from Lagery, to a design by the architect Jean Bonhomme. The layout involved four pavilions, one on each side of a courtyard, with a tower at each corner. The first pavilion on Rue des Consuls (now called Rue du Général Sarrail) was completed quickly, and the council began meeting there from 1628. Two more pavilions, the main façade facing Place de l'Hôtel de Ville and the rear façade facing Rue de la Gross Écritoire, were erected shortly thereafter and were complete by 1630.

The design involved a symmetrical main frontage of 19 bays facing onto Place de l'Hôtel de Ville, with the end three bays on either side projected forward as three-storey towers. The central section featured a square-headed doorway flanked by niches on the ground floor and a French door flanked by niches and fronted by a balcony on the first floor, all surmounted by a half-relief of King Louis XIII on horseback, supported by carved scrolls. There was an octagonal clock tower with a dome behind. The other bays on the ground floor, all the bays on the first floor, and all the bays on the second floor of the towers were fenestrated by tall casement windows. There were four dormer windows with segmental pediments at attic level in the central section. The bays on the ground floor were flanked by Doric order columns supporting a frieze with triglyphs; the bays on the first floor were flanked by Corinthian order columns supporting a frieze with floral decorations, while the bays on the second floor of the towers were flanked by Ionic order pilasters. The bell for the clock tower was cast by Pierre Roussel in March 1630.

The complex was expanded to a design by Nicolas Serrurier in the early 1820s to complete the quadrangle, with the pavilion facing Rue de Mars finally being in place by 1825. Further construction work, within the inner courtyard, was undertaken in the 1880s.

The building was badly damaged by German artillery on 3 March 1917 during the First World War and rebuilt after the war, with work commencing under Bernard Humbold (architecte en chef des monuments historiques) in 1924. The architects Roger-Henri Expert and Paul Bouchette contributed to the design, along with the sculptor Paul Berton, who was born in Reims. President Gaston Doumergue reopened the building on 10 June 1928.

Following the liberation of the town on 30 August 1944, during the Second World War, a plaque was unveiled in the town hall to commemorate the lives of the 16 members of council staff who had died in the war. In February 1957, the former British Secretary of State for War, Leslie Hore-Belisha, collapsed while making a speech in the building and died a few minutes later.
