= Jardins du Trocadéro =

Gardens in the 16th arrondissement of Paris

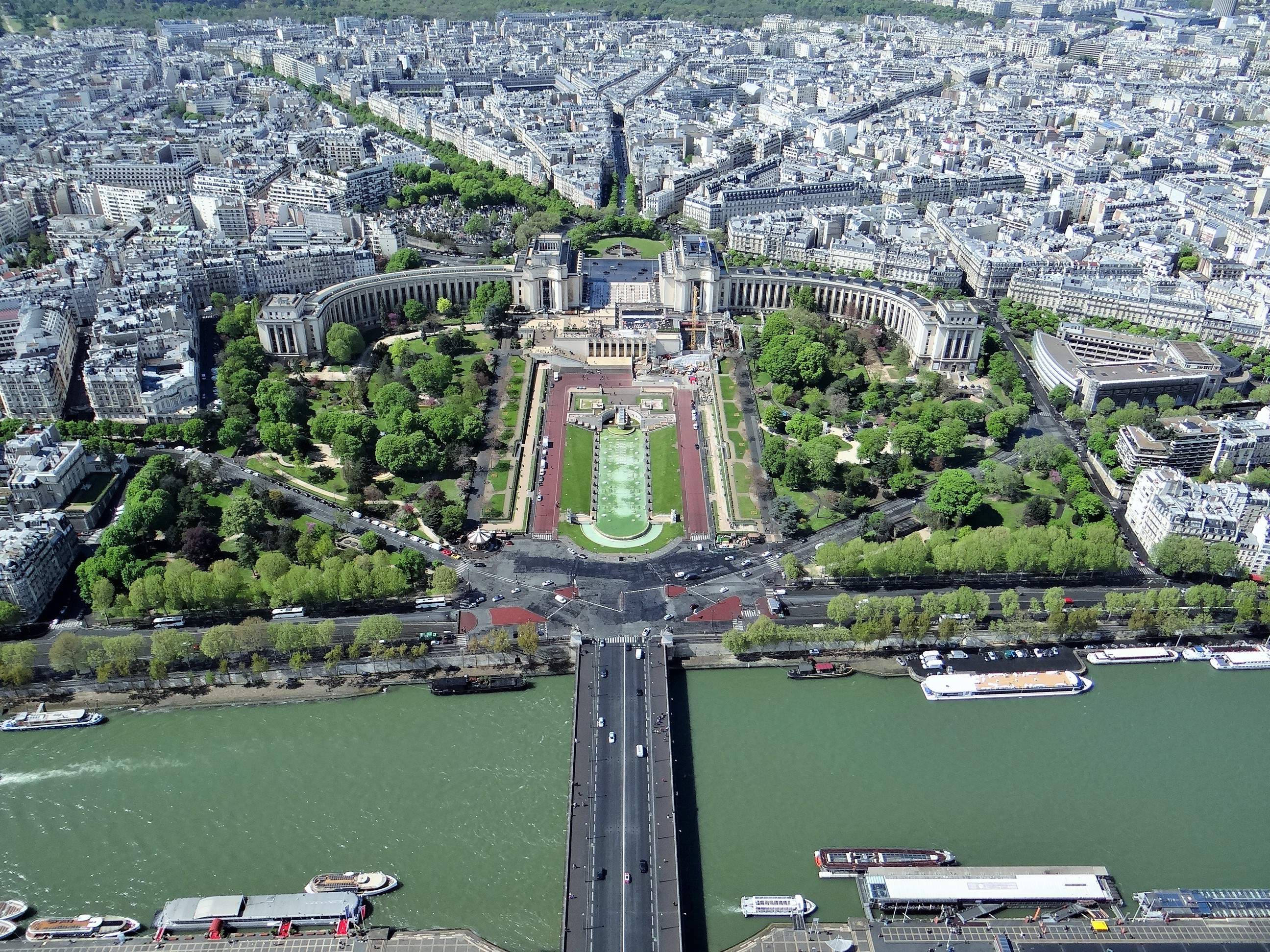
- View of the Trocadéro Gardens and Palais de Chaillot from the Eiffel Tower
- Interactive map of Jardins du Trocadéro
- Type: Urban park
- Location: 16th arrondissement of Paris, France
- Public transit: Trocadéro station (Paris Métro)

The Jardins du Trocadéro (French: [ʒaʁdɛ̃ dy tʁɔkadeʁo]; French for 'Gardens of the Trocadéro') is a public space in the 16th arrondissement of Paris, France. It is bounded to the northwest by the wings of the Palais de Chaillot and to the southeast by the Seine and the Pont d'Iéna at the Place de Varsovie, with the Eiffel Tower on the opposite bank of the Seine.

== History ==
A map of the Jardins du Trocadéro

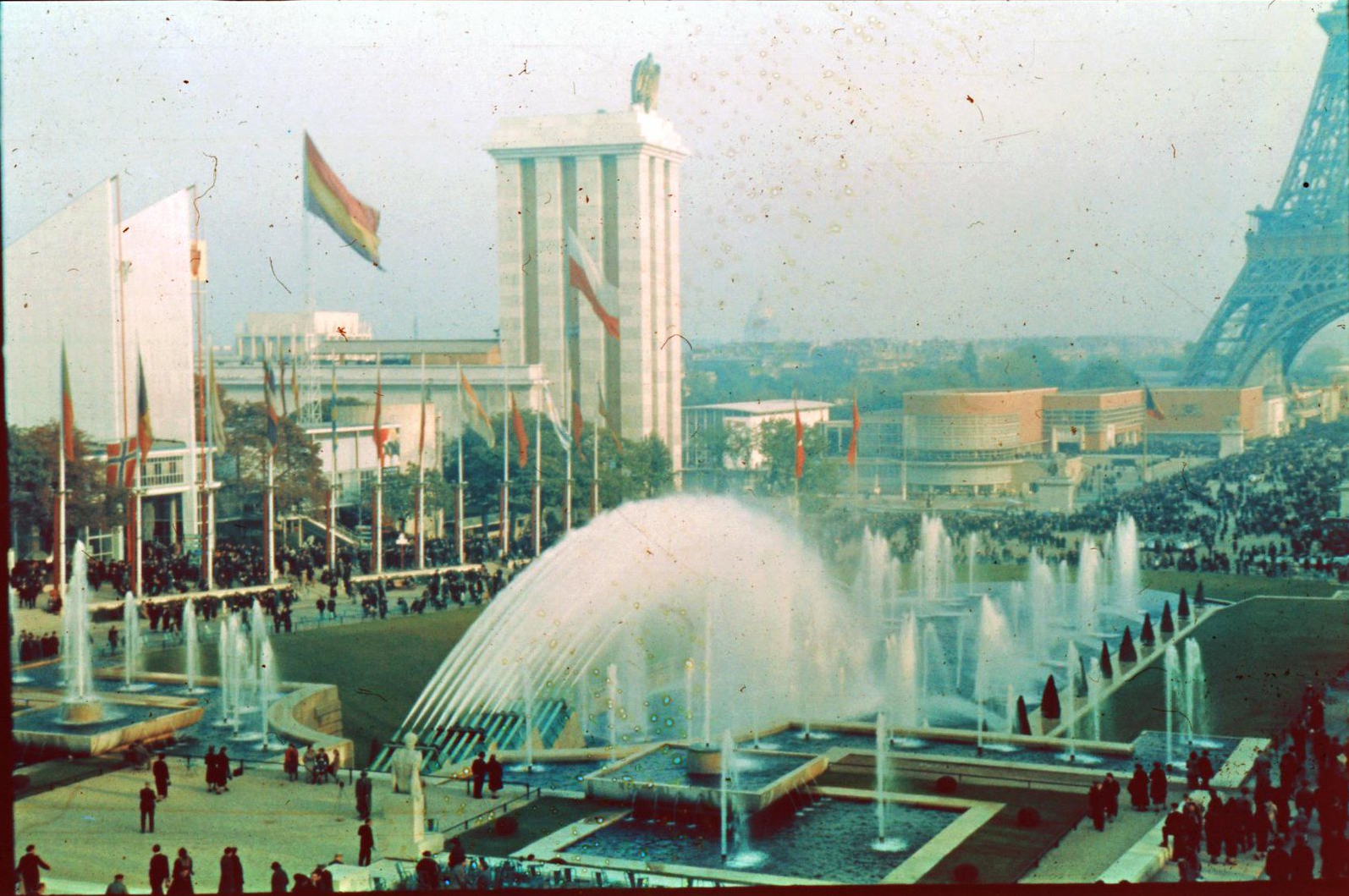
The Jardins du Trocadéro and Fountain of Warsaw with the Eiffel Tower in the background during the 1937 World Expo in Paris

The Palais de Chaillot in 1939 (Autochrome Lumière).

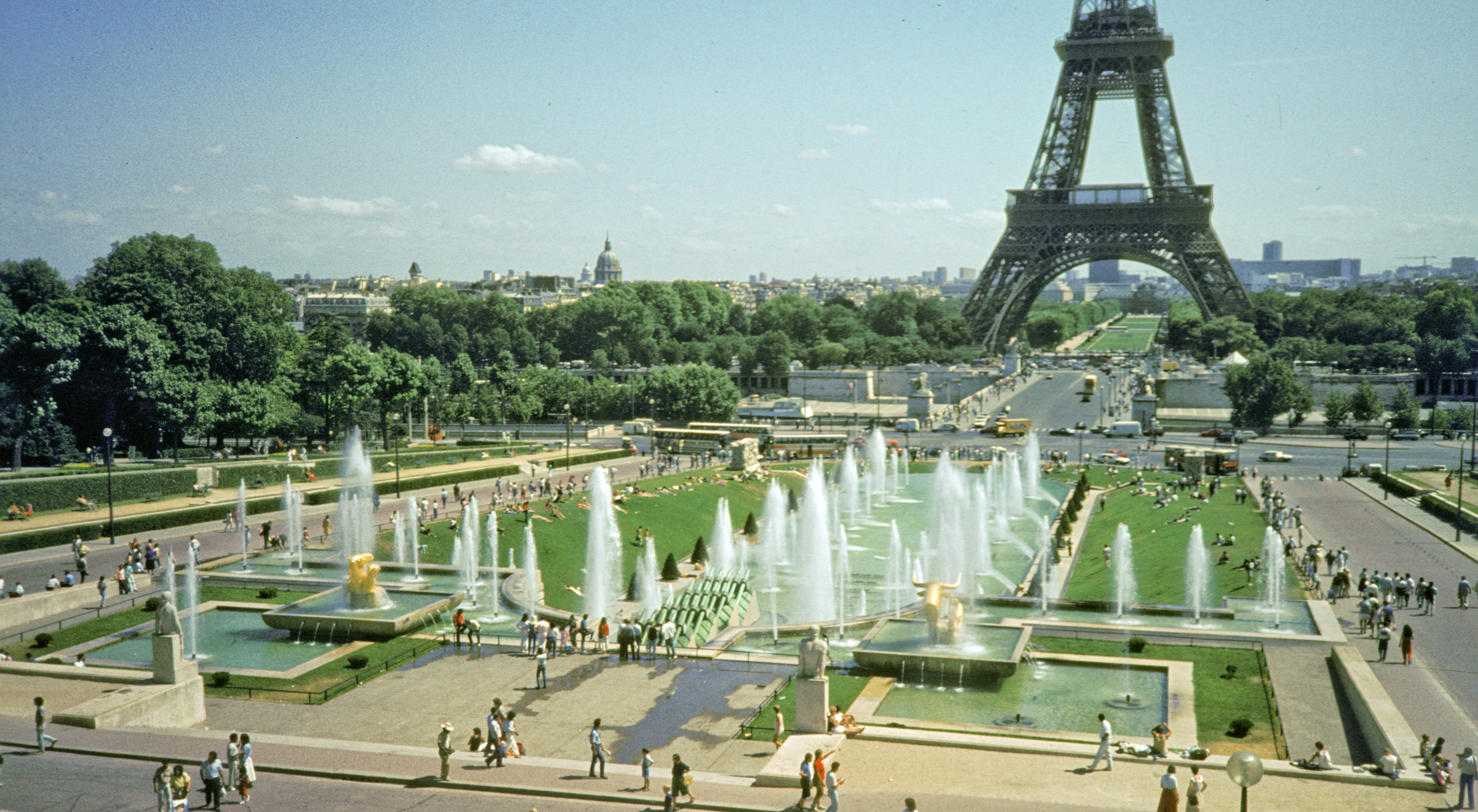
The Jardins du Trocadéro with the Eiffel Tower in the background

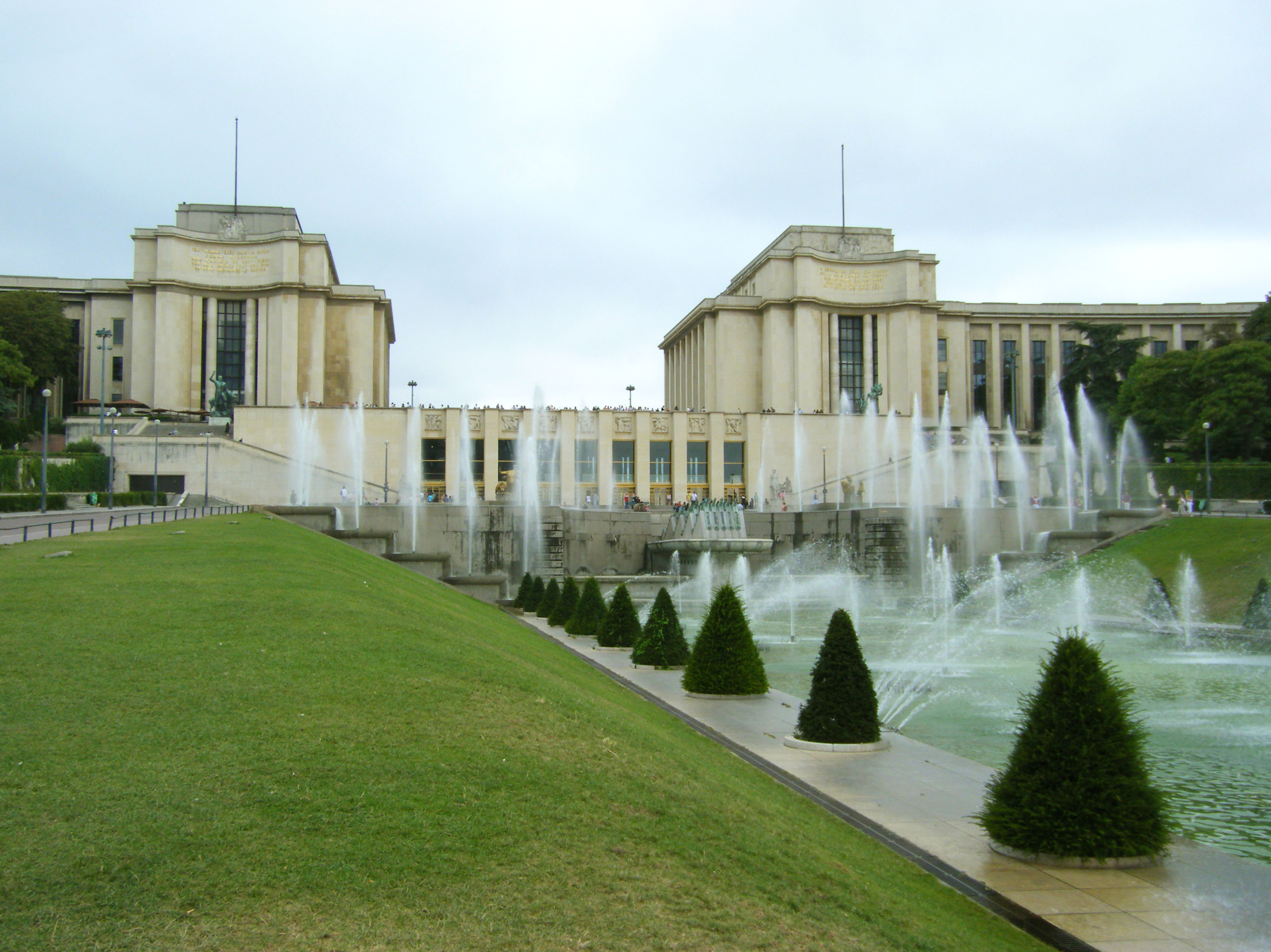
Fountain of Warsaw, with the Palais de Chaillot in the background

The entire site was formerly the garden of the original Trocadéro Palace, laid out by Adolphe Alphand for the 1878 Exposition Universelle.

The present garden has an area of 93,930 m^{2}, and was created for the Exposition Internationale des Arts et Techniques dans la Vie Moderne (1937). This was the design of Parisian architect Roger-Henri Expert.

During the exposition in 1937, the pavilions of Nazi Germany and the Soviet Union were facing each other on opposite sides of the Jardins du Trocadéro.

The grounds hosted the opening ceremony of the 2024 Summer Olympics.

== Main sights ==
=== Fontaine de Varsovie ===
The main feature, called the Fontaine de Varsovie (Fountain of Warsaw), is a long basin, or water mirror, with twelve fountains creating columns of water 12 metres high; twenty four smaller fountains four metres high; and ten arches of water. At one end, facing the Seine, are twenty powerful water cannons, able to project a jet of water fifty metres. Above the long basin are two smaller basins, linked with the lower basin by cascades flanked by 32 sprays of water four meters high. These fountains are the only exposition fountains which still exist today, and still function as they once did. In 2011, the fountain's waterworks were completely renovated and a modern pumping system was installed.

=== Statuary ===
With sloping fairways that run along the river, the garden terraces feature a number of sculptures, some dating from the 1930s, including:

- at the first level below the Palais de Chaillot, the matching stone statues L'Homme by Pierre Traverse, and La Femme by Daniel Bacqué, both leaning against stone pedestals
- two gilded bronze fountain sculptures in their own square basins, Bull and Deer by Paul Jouve and Horses and Dog by Georges Guyot
- 21-foot bronze Apollo with lyre (or Apollon musagète) group by sculptor Henri Bouchard
- a matching 21-foot bronze Hercules with bull, by Albert Pommier
- two matching stone groups on pedestals towards the southeastern end of the fountain, La Joie de vivre, by Léon-Ernest Drivier and Youth by Pierre Poisson
- a white, stone monument commemorating Polish veterans fighting to defend and liberate France 1939–1945, by André Greck (1978)

== Access ==
The location is near the metro station Trocadéro, at 48°51′39″N 2°17′24″E, on the lines 6 and 9.

== See also ==
- Trocadero District
- Trocadéro Palace
- Trocadéro Fountain
- Palais de Chaillot
- Eiffel Tower

== Sources ==
- this article partially sourced from French Wikipedia, sourced 9/11/2010
