= Lucien Brasseur =

French sculptor (1878–1960)

Lucien Alcide Constant Brasseur (30 August 1878 – 9 February 1960) was a French sculptor.

== Biography ==
Brasseur was born in Saultain in the Nord region. He graduated from the École des Beaux-Arts in 1894 and took first prize in the Prix de Rome for sculpture in 1905.

Between the wars, he made memorials for several municipalities in Northern France, including a major monument in Tourcoing and, perhaps his best-known, in Havrincourt, which includes a self-portrait. He also did memorials in Oisy-le-Verger and Saint-Omer and reliefs for the train station in Brest. In 1937, he created a statue for the Palais de Chaillot at the Exposition Universelle.

He is buried at the Cimetière parisien de Bagneux.

== Monuments aux morts ==
Work	Location	Subject, notes and references
Tourcoing	Tourcoing Nord-Pas-de-Calais	Perhaps Brasseur's best known work is the war memorial at Tourcoing, which took nine years to produce. Five sculptors submitted works to the committee established to supervise the erection of a monument aux morts and it was the work "La victoire qui mène les soldats à la gloire et à l'immortalité " by Lucien Brasseur which was chosen. The monument was finally inaugurated in 1931. 2,531 soldiers' deaths are recorded, as well as those of 177 civilians. A plaster model of the monument can be seen in the Musée des Beaux – Arts in Valenciennes. The monument has a pyramid like form and at its summit Brasseur has placed an "Angel of Victoire" riding a horse. Below her and on each side are columns of soldiers who climb up towards her, all carrying unfurled flags and pennants. At the base two soldiers appear to have collapsed with exhaustion or perhaps they are dead or wounded.
The monument aux morts at Havrincourt		For the monument aux morts here, Brasseur has created an extremely defiant looking soldier, who stands with hands on hips. It is said that the face of the soldier was a self-portrait. The Havrincourt monument was inaugurated on 17 May 1931 and a plaster model can be seen in the Musée des Beaux-Arts de Valenciennes in Valenciennes.
The monument aux morts at Oisy-le-Verger		Here Brasseur depicts two children standing beneath a soldier's helmet and bayonette hanging on a tree. The monument dates from 1923. There is also a plaque at the base of the monument which reads "In memoriam a la gloire des résistants OCM de la France combattante SERRURE André décapité à Munich par les nazis le 28 novembre 1944". In reading of this resistance fighter's beheading by the Nazis in Munich, we are reminded that the sufferings and losses of the people of Oisy-le-Verger were to be repeated in the Second World War.
The monument aux morts at Saint-Omer		The Saint Omer monument aux morts was inaugurated on 21 October 1923. It is recorded that some 300 choristers and musicians performed at the inauguration ceremony. It had been hoped that Maréchal Pétain would be present at the ceremony but he was unable to attend and his place was taken by Général Lacapelle. In Brasseur's composition the centre piece is an allegorical depiction of a "Victorious France". She holds up a dove to the sky and her right foot rests on an unpleasant looking lizard like creature, described as " le monstre des carnages humains" (The German invaders?). A total of 583 names are listed of those who perished in the Great War and further plaques record those lost fighting in the Second World War, Indochina and North Africa. There were three architects involved in designing the monument; Emile-Joseph Molinié, Charles-Henri Nicod and Albert Pouthier.

== Other works ==
His other works include:

Work	Location	Subject, notes and references
"La Femme au pigeon"	Valenciennes Nord-Pas-de-Calais	Brasseur's "La Femme au pigeon" can be seen in the rue du Paris in Valenciennes. A photograph is shown in the gallery below courtesy Sébastien Dusart.
"Les oiseaux"	Paris	"Les oiseaux" is one of eight gilded sculptures in front of the Palais de Chaillot in Paris, with a large plaster replica of the work held by the Palais des Beaux-Arts de Lille
"La Pensée" and "L'Inspiration lyrique"	Valenciennes Nord-Pas-de-Calais	Brasseur executed two gilded bronzes which are located on the façade of the Musée des Beaux-Arts in Valenciennes. Photograph of these two works are shown in the gallery below, shown courtesy of Sébastien Dusart.
Statue of Constantine	El Kantara Algeria	This work is in front of the railway station at El Kantara. It is a copy of the work in marble at the Basilique St Jean de Latran in Rome.
"Buste d'Harpignies"	Paris	Brasseur executed this bronze bust of Henri Harpignies which is kept in the Musée National d'Art Moderne - Centre Georges Pompidou in Paris.
Bas-reliefs at the Gare de Brest.	Brest Brittany	It was in 1936 that the architect Urbain Cassan was commissioned to design the Brest railway station and his design included a bas-relief by Brasseur in red granite on a bell-tower. Only the lower part of this tower still exists including Brasseur's work.
"Cérès enseigne l'agriculture à Triptolème, fils de Pelée, roi d'Eleusis"	Paris	This was Brasseurs work which won the Prix de Rome in 1905. It is held in the École nationale supérieure des Beaux-Arts in Paris.
"Ulysse naufragé"	Valenciennes Nord-Pas-de-Calais	This sculpture is held in the Musée des Beaux-Arts in Valenciennes.
"Le Bouvier"	Le Mans Sarthe Pays de la Loire	The Musée de Tessé in Mans have a bronze by Brasseur entitled "Le Bouvier" ("Cowman").
Sculpture of David d'Angers	Angers Maine-et-Loire Pays de la Loire	This work was acquired on 9 March 1948 for the Mairie of Angers.
"Femme drapée"	Thionville Moselle Lorraine	This sculpture was acquired by the Mairie in Thionville.
Maréchal Lobau	Verdun Meuse Lorraine	This sculpture was acquired by the Mairie in Verdun.
Sculpture of Louis Leseigneur	Barentin Seine-Maritime Upper Normandy	This work was acquired by the Mairie in Baretin.
Henri Harpignies	Lisieux Calvados Lower Normandy	This sculpture of Henri Harpignies was acquired by the Mairie in Lisieux and is now held by Musée du Vieux-Lisieux.
"L'enfant prodigue"	Valenciennes Nord-Pas-de-Calais	This work in marble dates from 1937 and is held by the Musée des Beaux-Arts in Valenciennes.
"Le Sacré-Coeur"	Barentin Seine-Maritime Upper Normandy	This work was acquired by the Mairie of Barentin and is in a Barentin church.
