= Palais de Chaillot =

Building in Paris

Coordinates: 48°51′44″N 2°17′17″E

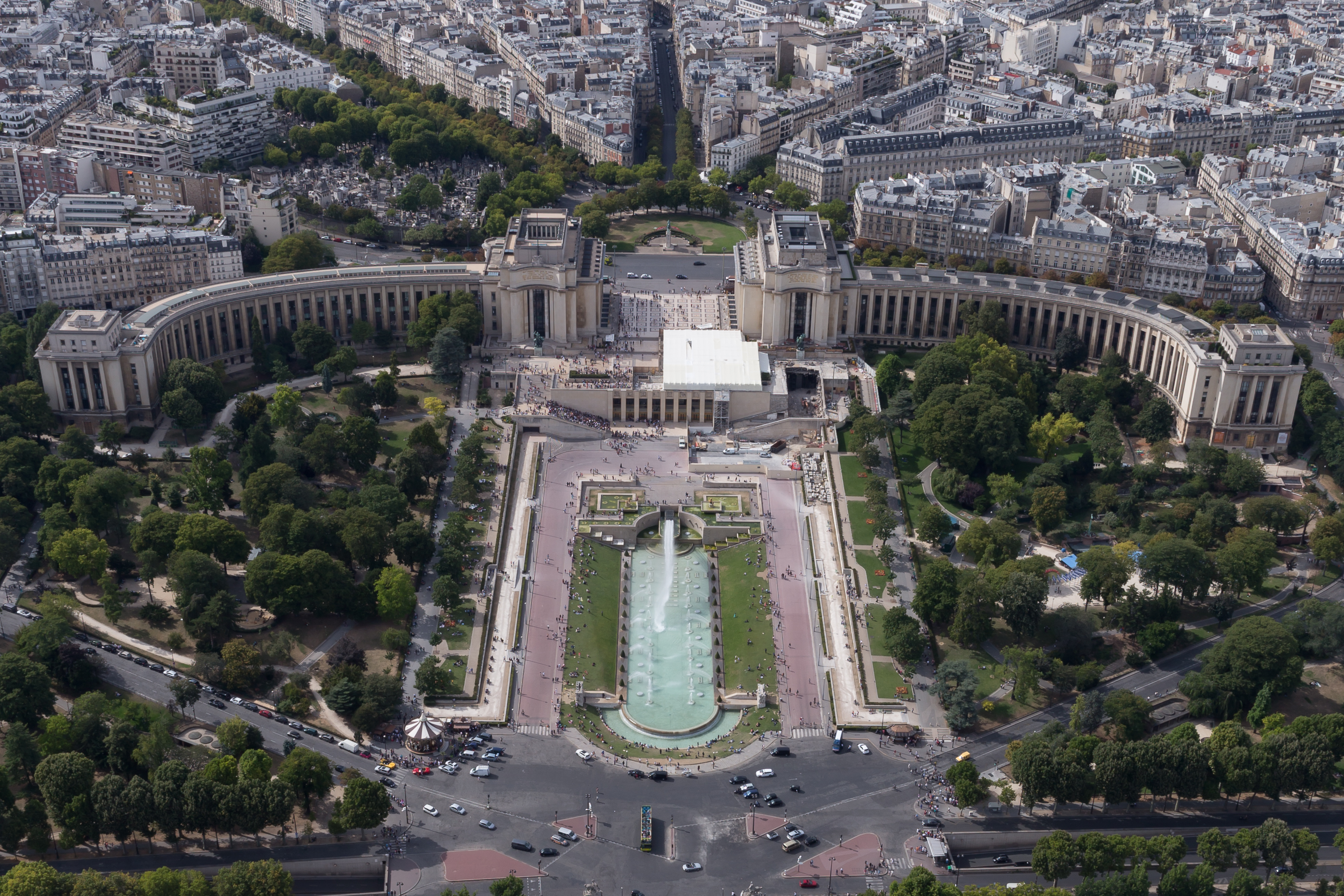
View of the Chaillot Palace and the Jardins du Trocadéro from the Eiffel Tower in 2015.

The Chaillot Palace (/ʃɑːˈjoʊ/ shah-YOH; French: Palais de Chaillot [palɛ də ʃajo]) is a building atop the Chaillot Hill in the Trocadéro area, in the 16th arrondissement of Paris, France.

== Design ==
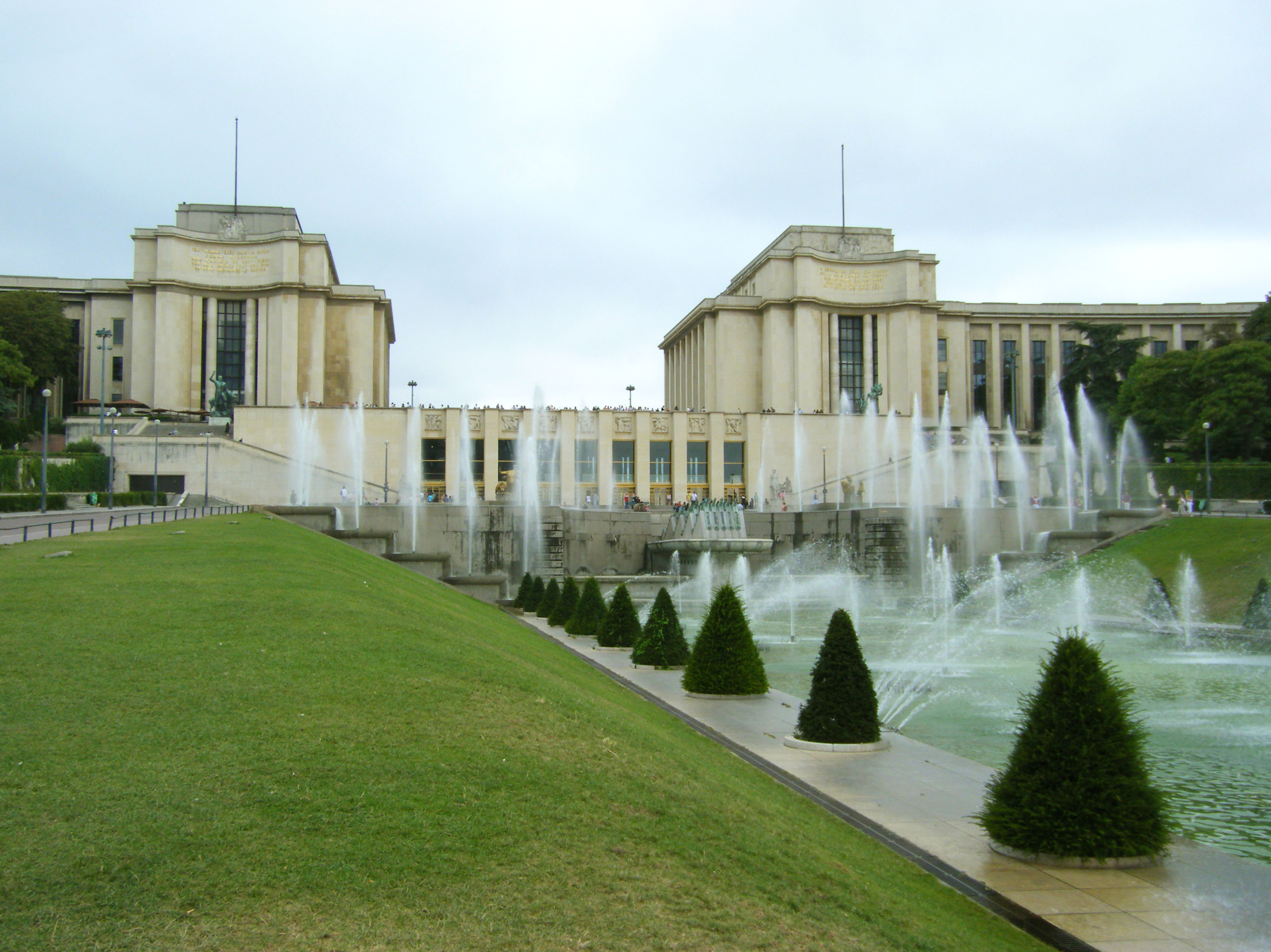
Fountain of Warsaw, with the Chaillot Palace in the background.

The building was designed in classicising "moderne" style by architects Louis-Hippolyte Boileau, Jacques Carlu and Léon Azéma. The Palace consists of two separate wings shaped to form a wide arc, which are those of the former Palais du Trocadéro with new taller portions built in front. The pair of larger central pavilions are also those of the former Palais du Trocadéro, encapsulated in new construction. The large central hall and towers of the old palace were demolished, leaving only the basement, with a wide esplanade created on top, establishing an open view from the Place du Trocadéro to the Eiffel Tower and beyond.

The buildings are decorated with quotations by Paul Valéry, and sculptural groups at the attic level by Raymond Delamarre, Carlo Sarrabezolles and Alfred Bottiau. The eight gilded figures on the terrace of the Rights of Man are attributed to the sculptors Alexandre Descatoire, Marcel Gimond, Jean Paris dit Pryas, Paul Cornet, Lucien Brasseur, Robert Couturier, Paul Niclausse and Félix-Alexandre Desruelles.

The buildings now house a number of museums:

- the Musée national de la Marine (naval museum) and the Musée de l'Homme (prehistory and anthropology) in the southern (Passy) wing,
- the Cité de l'Architecture et du Patrimoine, including the Musée national des Monuments Français, in the eastern (Paris) wing, from which one also enters the Théâtre national de Chaillot, a theatre below the esplanade.

== History ==
=== Construction ===
For the Exposition Internationale of 1937, the old 1878 Palais du Trocadéro was partly demolished and partly rebuilt to create the Chaillot Palace.

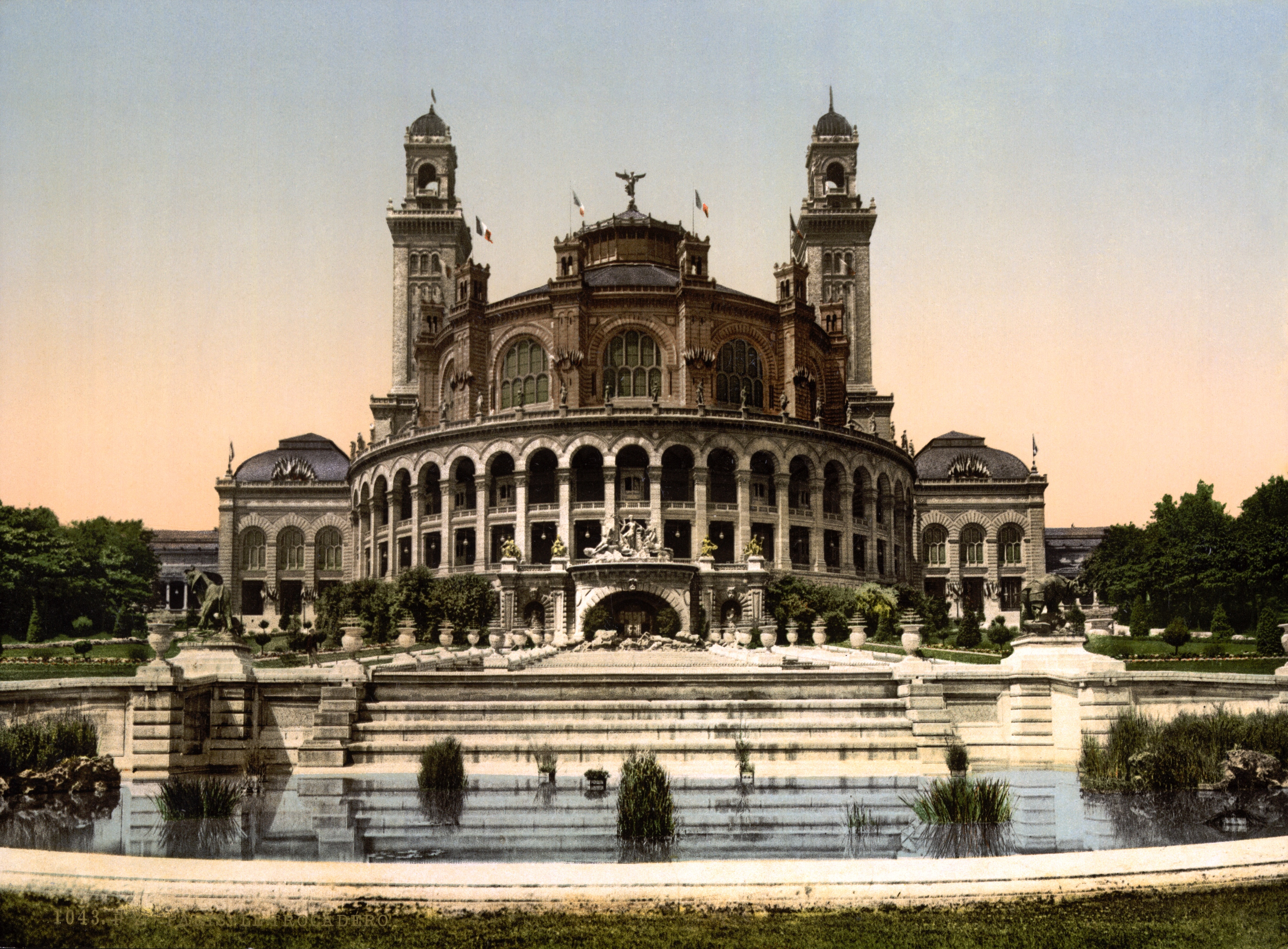
The old Palais du Trocadéro in the late 19th century.

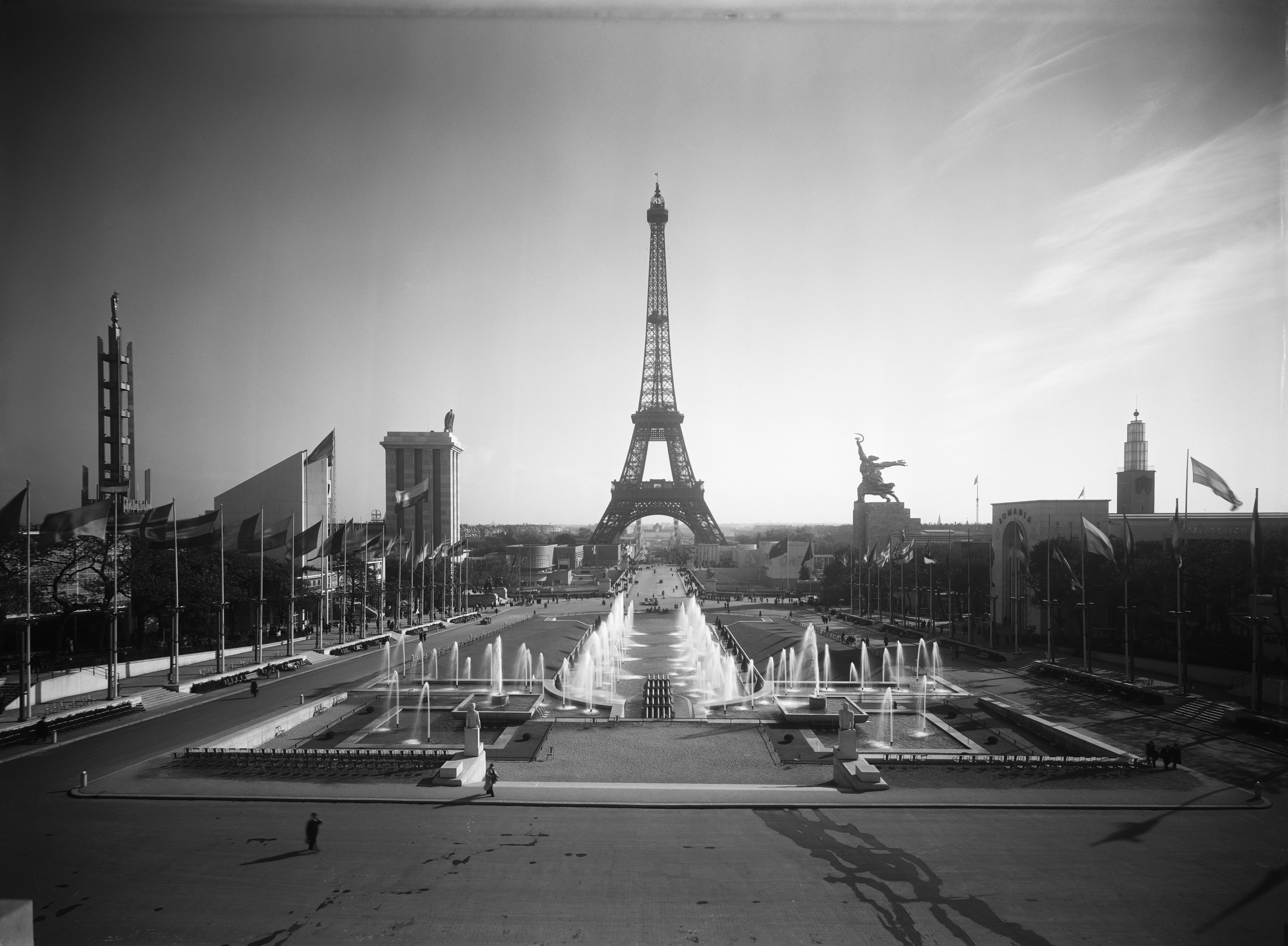
The pavilions of Soviet Russia (right) and Nazi Germany (left) faced each other at the 1937 Expo.

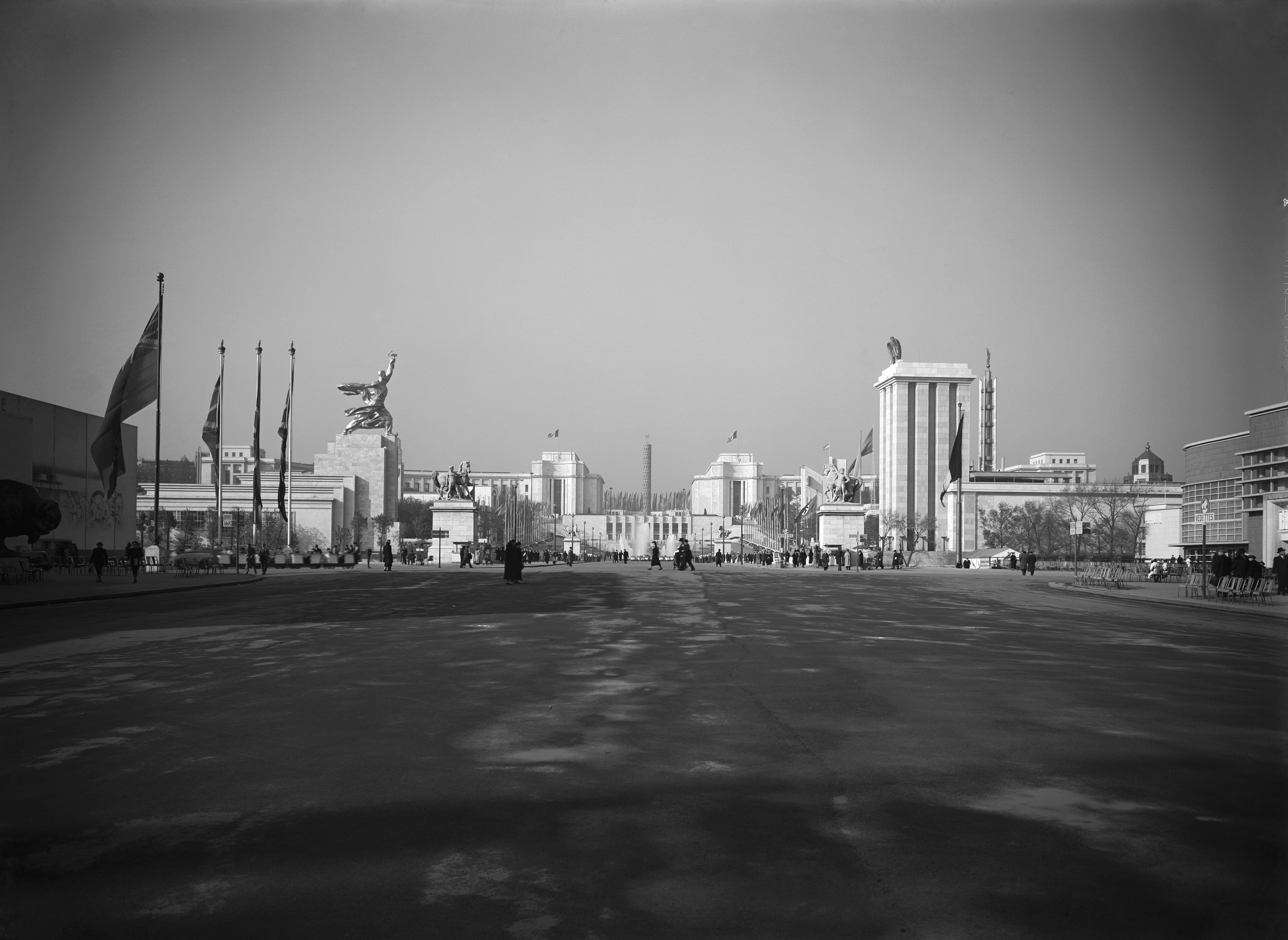
The Palais de Chaillot in Paris during the World Expo in 1937.

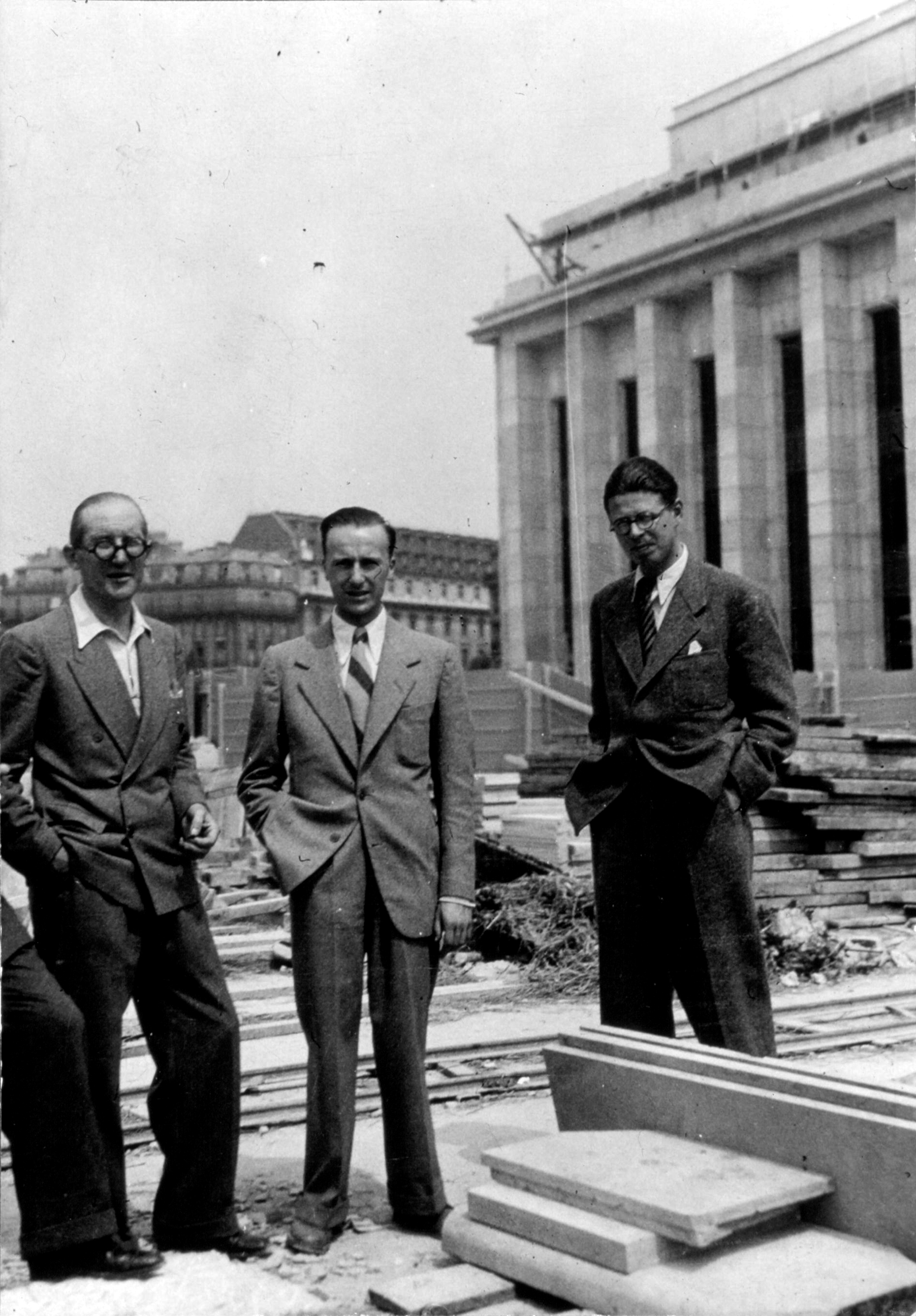
Le Corbusier in front of the Palais de Chaillot in Paris during the World Expo in 1937.

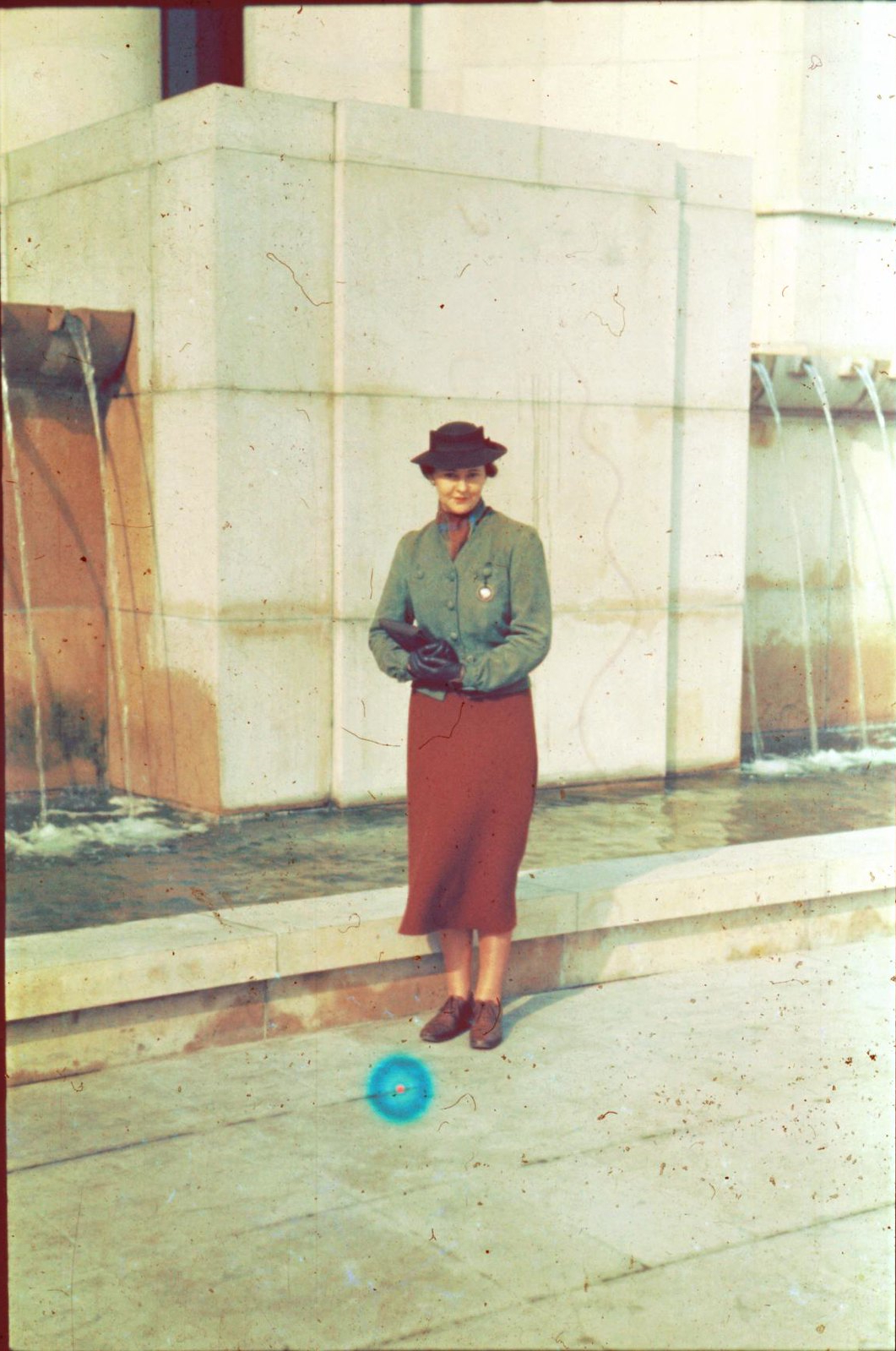
The Palais de Chaillot, fountain at the entrance to the building in 1937.

The Palais de Chaillot in 1939 (Autochrome Lumière).

=== World War II ===
It was on the front terrace of the palace that Adolf Hitler was pictured during his short tour of the city in 1940, with the Eiffel Tower in the background. This became an iconic image of the Second World War. On VE Day, 8 May 1945, the U.S. Army in Paris celebrated their victory on the same spot. Over 2800 soldiers, sailors and airmen listened to the victory speech to the troops by President Harry S. Truman, and then an address by the ranking officer in Paris, Lt. Gen John C. H. Lee, commanding general of the Com-Z logistics operations of the U.S. Army in Europe since May 1942.

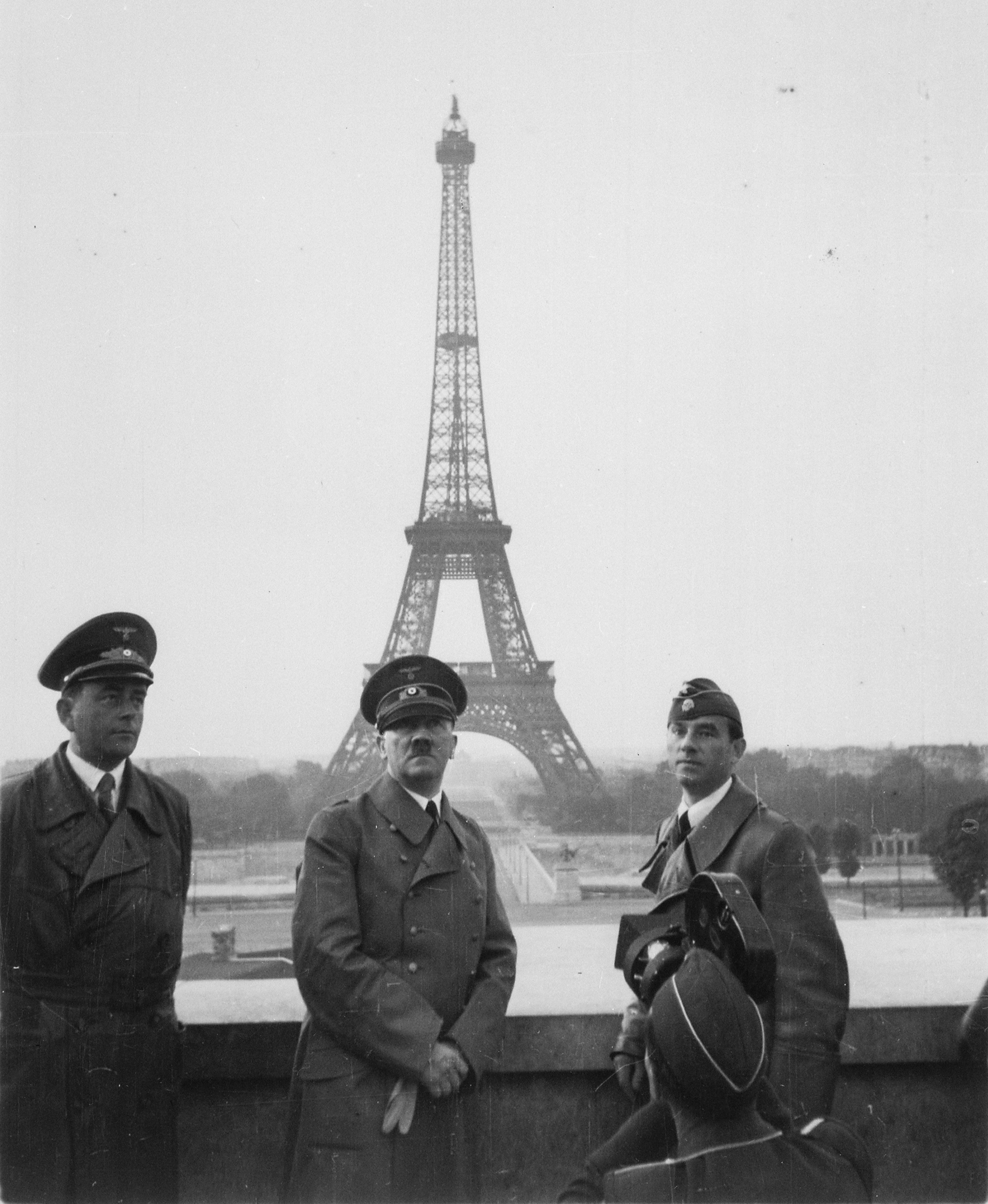
Adolf Hitler visiting the Trocadéro with Albert Speer (left) and sculptor Arno Breker (right) on 23 June 1940 during the Battle of France.

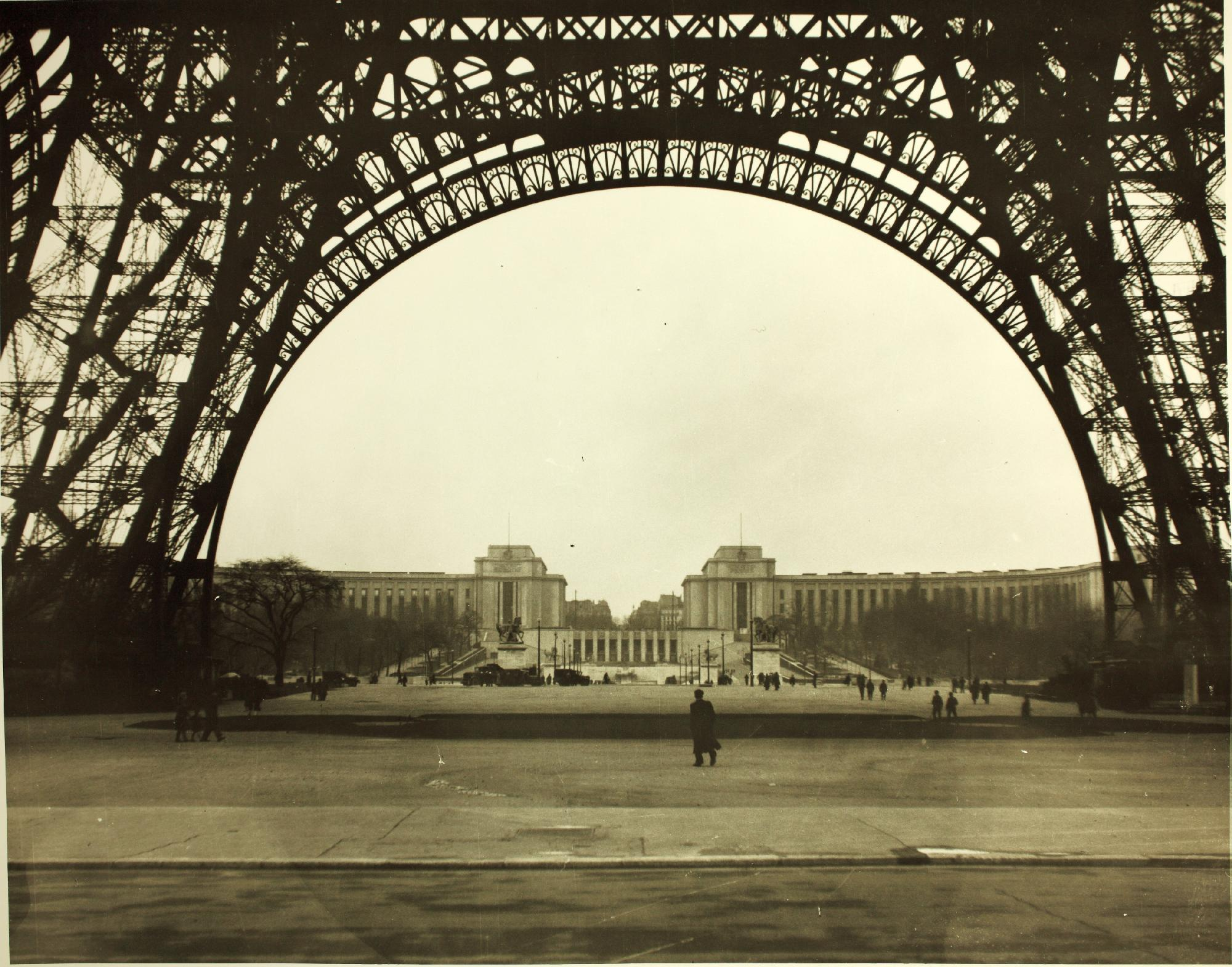
Palais de Chaillot in 1940s.

U.S. Army soldiers in front of the Palais de Chaillot after liberation of Paris.

=== Post-World War II ===
==== 1948/1951: United Nations General Assembly ====
In 1948, the Chaillot Palace hosted the third United Nations General Assembly (UNGA), and, in 1951, the sixth UNGA It is in the Chaillot Palace that the UNGA adopted the Universal Declaration of Human Rights on 10 December 1948. This event is now commemorated by a stone, and the esplanade is known as the esplanade des droits de l'homme ("esplanade of human rights").

==== 1952–1959: Temporary NATO headquarters ====
The Chaillot Palace also served as temporary NATO headquarters in Paris, from 1952 until the permanent HQ at "Palais de l'OTAN" (now Université Paris Dauphine) was inaugurated in 1959.

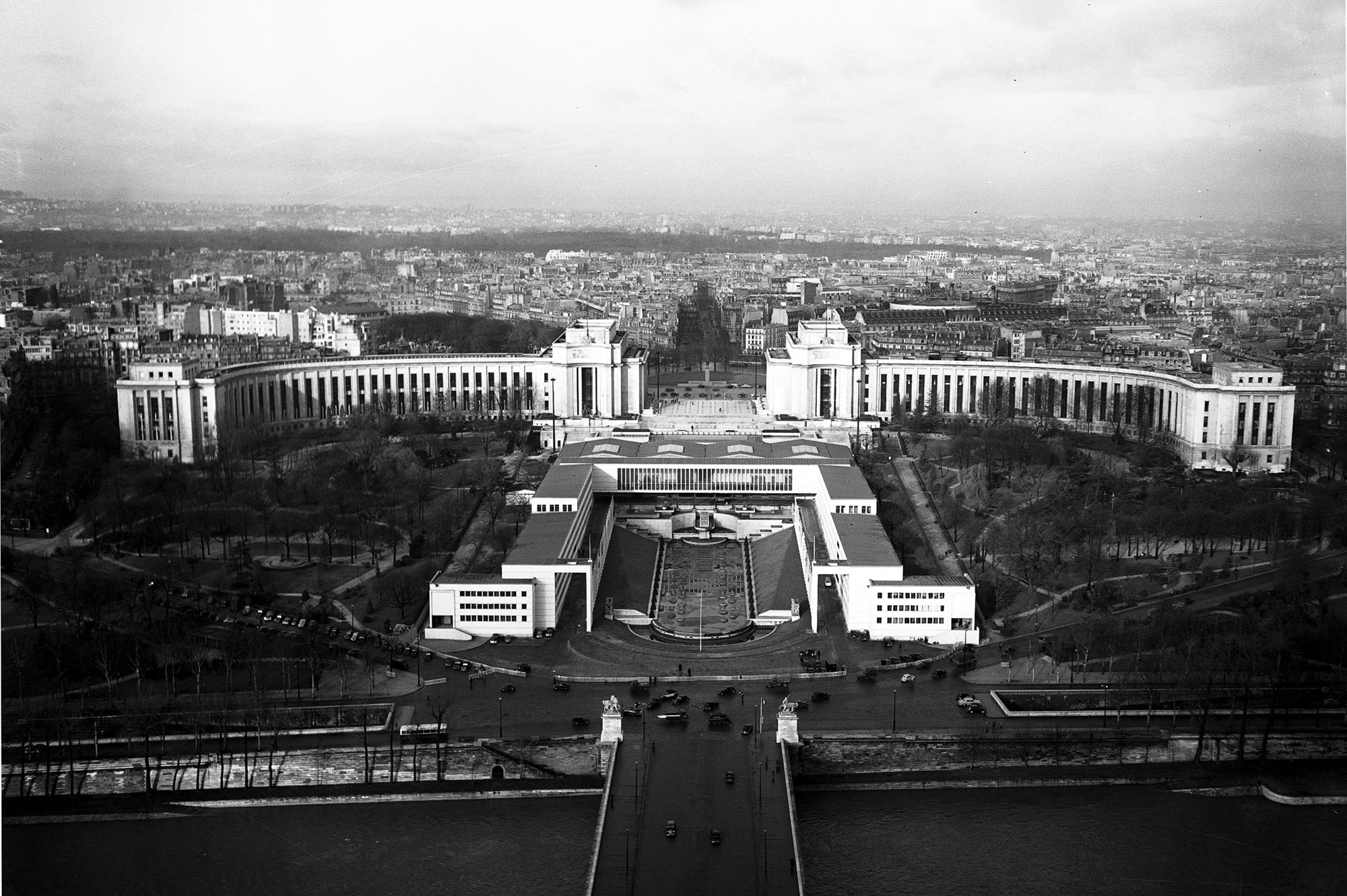
Former annex along the reflecting pool, which housed NATO headquarters between 1952 and 1959.

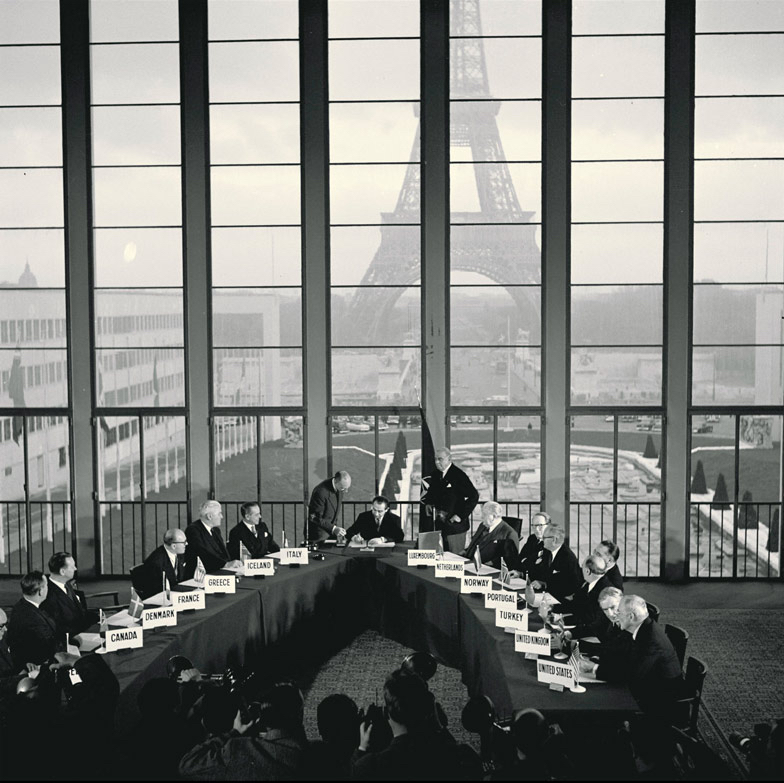
Signing of NATO membership invitation to West Germany in 1954, in the temporary NATO annex.

== Related articles ==
- Trocadéro Palace
- Château de Chaillot
- Trocadéro Fountain
