= Avenue d'Eylau =

Avenue in Paris, France

The Avenue d'Eylau is a two-way street in the 16th arrondissement of Paris. It connects the Place du Trocadéro-et-du-11-Novembre and the Place de Mexico, 300 metres to the north-west. It is named after Napoleon's victory at the Battle of Eylau in 1807.
