= Pierre Traverse =

French sculptor (1892–1979)

- Born: 1892; Saint-André-de-Cubzac
- Died: 1979 (aged 86–87); Paris
- Occupation: Sculptor

Pierre Traverse (1892 – 1979) was a French sculptor, who was born in Saint-André-de-Cubzac.

== Biography ==
Pierre Traverse was born on 1 April 1892 in Saint-André-de-Cubzac in the Dordogne in France. His father sent him to Limoges to study and he then enrolled at the École des Beaux-Arts in Paris and was attached to the studios of Jean-Antoine Injalbert. In Paris he exhibited at the Salon des Artistes Français, of which he was an hors-concours member, the Salon d’Automne and the Salon des Artistes Décorateurs. His first showing at the Salon des Artistes Français was a group composition entitled "Les Présents de la Terre". He received a silver medal in 1921, a gold medal in 1926 and a diploma of honor in 1937 at the Exposition Internationale in Paris. He was also awarded a medal of honor in 1942 and was decorated with the Légion d'honneur in 1938. Works by Traverse can be found in the Musée du Petit Palais in Paris. Traverse died in 1979. Traverse's works can be seen at the Musée de Mont de Marsan, the Musée des Années Trente in Boulogne and in the Musée d'Art Moderne de Paris (MAM Paris). Traverse also occasionally worked in porcelain. Traverse also contributed a bas-relief for the Paris Colonial Exhibition ("exposition coloniale") of 1931

== Main works ==
Four examples of Traverse's work can be seen in Paris.

=== The sculpture "L'Homme" ===
This work by Traverse can be seen in the jardins-du-trocadero.

=== "Deux femmes et un enfant" ===
This 1938 composition can be seen in Paris' Parc de la Butte du Chapeau-Rouge, a park created in 1939 and designed by Léon Azéma. The sculpture forms part of a fountain along with the work "Eve" by Raymond Couvègnes.

=== "Maternité" ===
This sculpture dates to 1930 and can be seen in the gardens of the Musée Paul Belmondo in Boulogne-Billancourt

=== Three reliefs in Paris' rue des Reculettes ===
These reliefs were executed in 1941.
