= Roger-Henri Expert =

French architect (1882-1955)

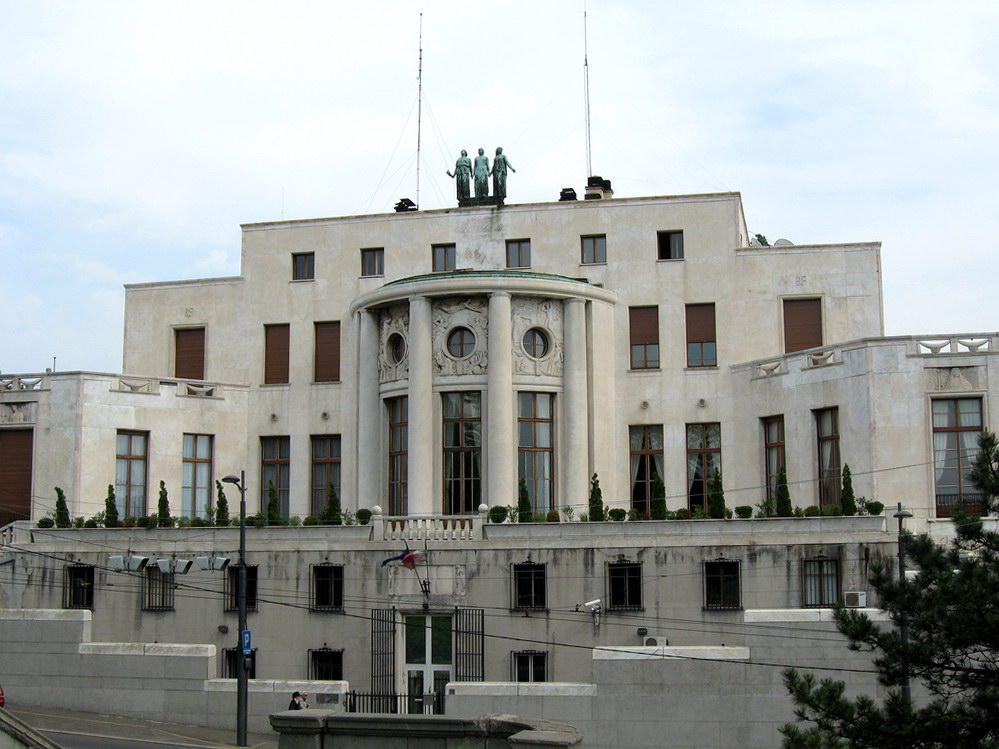
French Embassy Art Deco style, Belgrade, Serbia

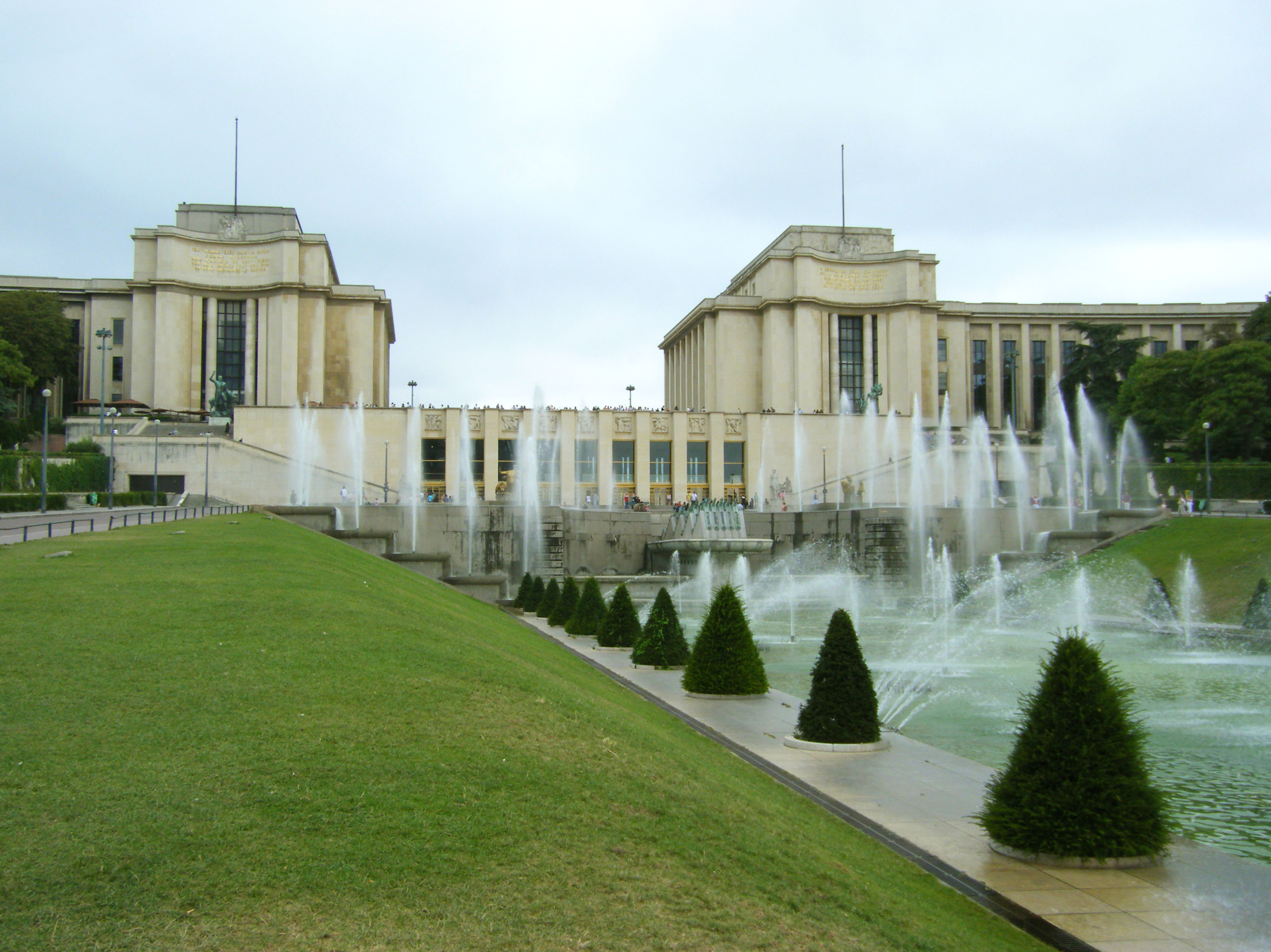
fountains of the Jardins du Trocadéro

Roger-Henri Expert (18 April 1882 – 13 April 1955) was a French architect.

== Life ==
The son of a merchant, Expert first studied painting at the École des beaux-arts in Bordeaux, then from 1906 attended the École nationale supérieure des Beaux-Arts in Paris, where he studied under Gaston Redon and Gustave Umbdenstock. In 1912 he won the second Prix de Rome and spent three years in Rome at the Villa Medici. He returned to the Ecole as an instructor, in 1922, then as the head of his atelier in 1934, until 1953.

In 1921 he accepted a position as Architecte des Bâtiments civils et palais nationaux (official architect of national structures), responsible for the maintenance of the Louvre Palace, Gobelins Manufactory, the Panthéon, as well as new projects for embassies, fair pavilions and other government commissions through the 1950s.

Stylistically Expert worked in a simplified classicism tending towards Art Deco—his Tourism Pavilion for the 1925 International Exhibition of Hydropower and Tourism in Grenoble is an early and uncharacteristic showy example. He also developed an expertise in architectural lighting. (His dramatic floodlighting for the 1937 Paris Exposition, seen by Albert Speer, preceded Speer's "cathedral of light" at the Festliches Nürnberg by a few months.)

Expert was made Commander of the Légion d'honneur in 1950, and appointed to the Académie des Beaux-Arts in 1954. He died the following year, and is buried at the cemetery at Arcachon.

== Work ==
- reconstruction of the Hôtel-de-ville, Reims, with sculptor Carlo Sarrabezolles, 1924–1927
- Hotel Splendid and the casino, Dax, Landes, 1925–1932
- Tourism Pavilion, exposition internationale de la houille blanche et du tourisme, Grenoble, 1925
- the Rue d'Ulm buildings of the École nationale supérieure des arts décoratifs, Paris, 1927–1928
- French Embassy, Belgrade, Serbia, with sculptor Carlo Sarrabezolles, 1928–1933
- two pavilions and the illuminated lights for the Paris Colonial Exposition, with fellow architect André Granet, 1931
- decorative scheme for the SS Normandie, circa 1932
- The 10 Rue Küss School, reinforced concrete in the shape of a ship, 13th arrondissement, Paris, 1932–1934
- fountains and pools of the Jardins du Trocadéro, for the Exposition Internationale des Arts et Techniques dans la Vie Moderne (1937), Paris
- French pavilion for the 1939 New York World's Fair, with architect Pierre Patout, 1939
- interior of the French Embassy, London, 1946–1948
- residential building towers within the Old Port of Marseille, 1946–1952
- the reinforced concrete Sainte-Thérèse-de-l'Enfant-Jésus church, Metz, begun 1937, completed 1954

== Sources ==
- Brief biography of Expert @ Cité de l'architecture et du patrimoine
- this page translated from its French equivalent accessed 9/13/2010
