= Sainte-Jeanne-de-Chantal =

Sainte-Jeanne-de-Chantal may refer to:

- Jane Frances de Chantal (1572–1641), a Roman Catholic Saint
- Sainte-Jeanne-de-Chantal (Paris), a church in Paris
- Sainte-Jeanne-de-Chantal (Île Perrot), a church in Quebec
