= Sainte Jeanne de Chantal Church =

Sainte Jeanne de Chantal Church may refer to:

- Sainte-Jeanne-de-Chantal (Paris), a church in Paris
- Sainte-Jeanne-de-Chantal (Île Perrot), a church in Quebec
