= Chausse =

Chausse, Chaussé or Chausses may refer to:

- Chausses, a medieval term for leggings, also used for leg armour
- Chausse (grape), or Béquignol noir
- Chaussé (heraldry), a method of division of the field in heraldry
- Alcide Chaussé (1868–1944), Canadian architect
- Chausse, Idaho, a place in Idaho, U.S.
