= 16th arrondissement of Paris =

Municipal arrondissement in Île-de-France, France

- Municipal arrondissement
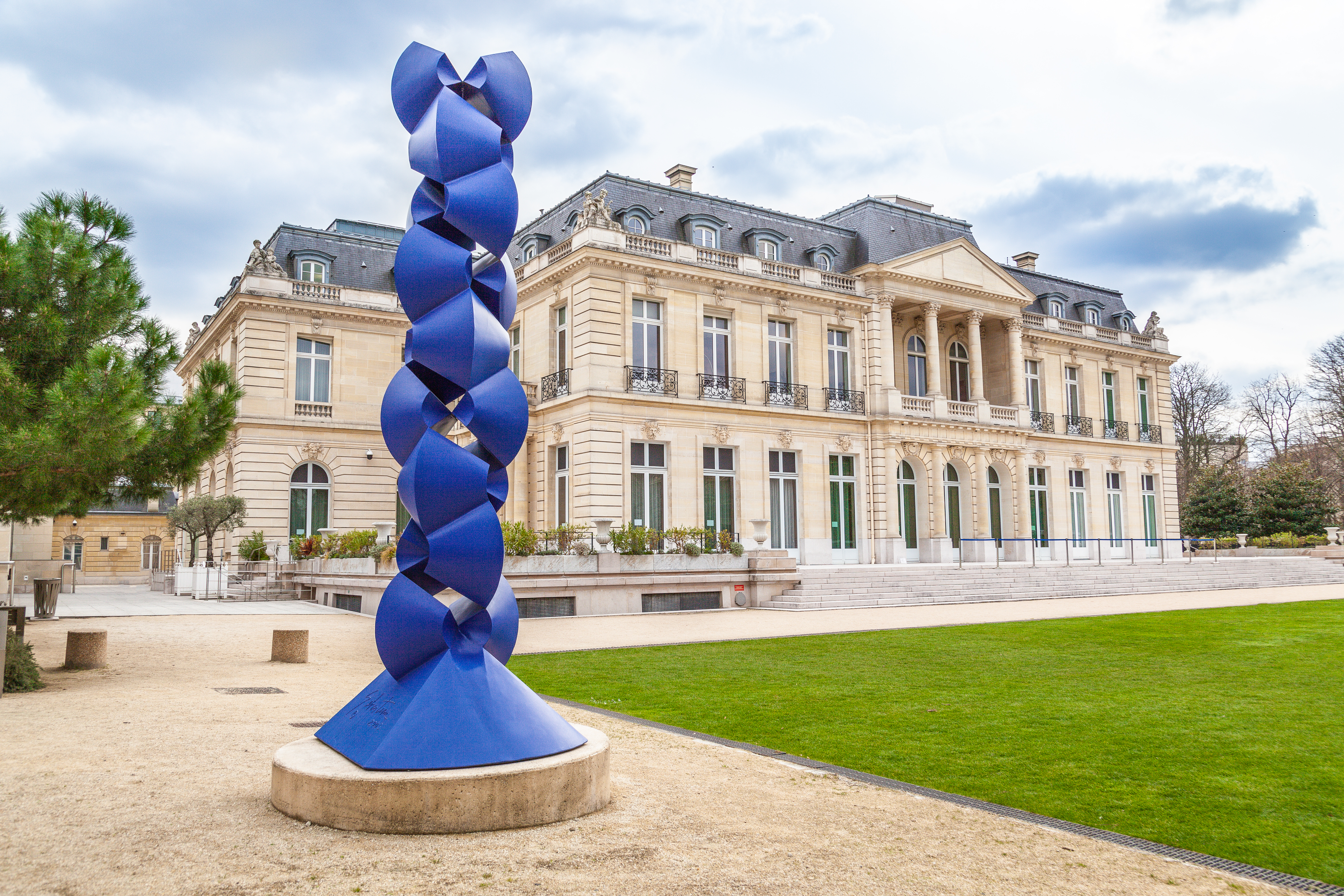
- The Château de la Muette, the OECD's headquarters in Paris

- Coat of arms

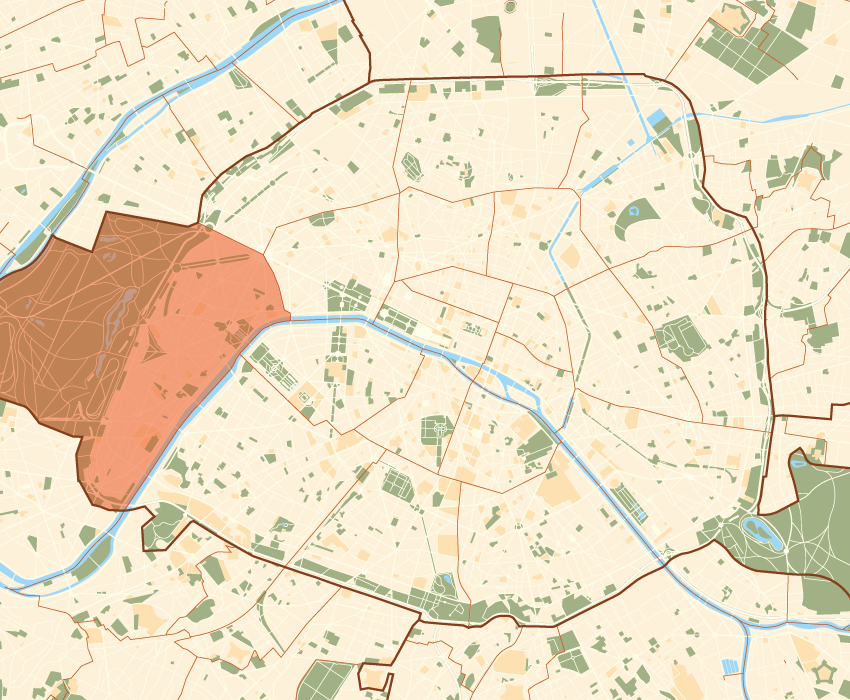
- Location within Paris
- Coordinates: 48°51′49″N 2°16′35″E
- Country: France
- Region: Île-de-France
- Department: Paris
- Commune: Paris

Government
  - Mayor (2023–2026): Jérémy Redler (LR)
- Area: 16.30 km^{2} (6.29 sq mi)
- Population (2023): 159,386
  - Density: 9,778/km^{2} (25,330/sq mi)
- INSEE code: 75116

The 16th arrondissement of Paris (le XVI^{e} arrondissement; French pronunciation: [lə sɛzjɛm aʁɔ̃dismɑ̃]) is the westernmost of the 20 arrondissements of Paris, the capital city of France. Located on the city's Right Bank, it is adjacent to the 17th and 8th arrondissements to the northeast, as well as to the suburb of Boulogne-Billancourt, Hauts-de-Seine to the southwest. Across the Seine are the 7th and 15th arrondissements. In 2023, it had a population of 159,386.

Notable sights of the 16th arrondissement include the Arc de Triomphe (at the junction with the 8th and 17th arrondissements) and the Place du Trocadéro, where the Palais de Chaillot stands. This complex is used for three museums and one theatre. Other museums and cultural venues are also located in this arrondissement, including the Louis Vuitton Foundation opened in 2014.

With its ornate 19th-century buildings, large avenues, prestigious schools, museums, and various parks, the 16th arrondissement has long been known as one of French high society's favourite places of residence (comparable to London's Kensington and Chelsea or Berlin's Charlottenburg) to such an extent that the phrase le 16^{e} has been associated with great wealth in French popular culture. Indeed, the 16th arrondissement of Paris is France's third-richest district for average household income, behind only its 7th arrondissement and the suburb of Neuilly-sur-Seine, both of which are adjacent.

The 16th arrondissement hosts several large sporting venues, including: the Parc des Princes, which is the stadium where Paris Saint-Germain football club plays its home matches; Roland Garros Stadium, where the French Open tennis championships are held; and Stade Jean-Bouin, home to the Stade Français rugby union club and the football club Paris FC. The Bois de Boulogne, the second-largest public park in Paris (behind only the Bois de Vincennes), is also located in this arrondissement.

== History ==
The 16th arrondissement was created by the Law of 16 June 1859 which incorporated the villages (now neighborhoods) of Auteuil, Passy and Chaillot into Paris; these villages had become communes after the French Revolution and had been in the Seine department ever since. When the law of 1859 was drafted, it was planned that these villages would form a new arrondissement that would be numbered the 13th arrondissement, but "The rich and powerful moving in did not like the number. They pulled strings and became the 16th, the unlucky association and postmark being transferred to the blameless but less influential folks around Porte d'Italie."

== Geography ==
The quarters of the 16th arrondissement

The land area of this arrondissement is 16.305 km^{2} (6.295 sq mi or 4,029 acres), slightly more than half of which consists of the Bois de Boulogne park. Excluding the Bois de Boulogne, its land area is 7.846 km^{2} (3.029 sq mi or 1,939 acres). It is the largest arrondissement in Paris in terms of land area.

The arrondissement consists of four quarters:

- Quartier Auteuil (61)
- Quartier Muette (62)
- Quartier Porte-Dauphine (63)
- Quartier Chaillot (64)
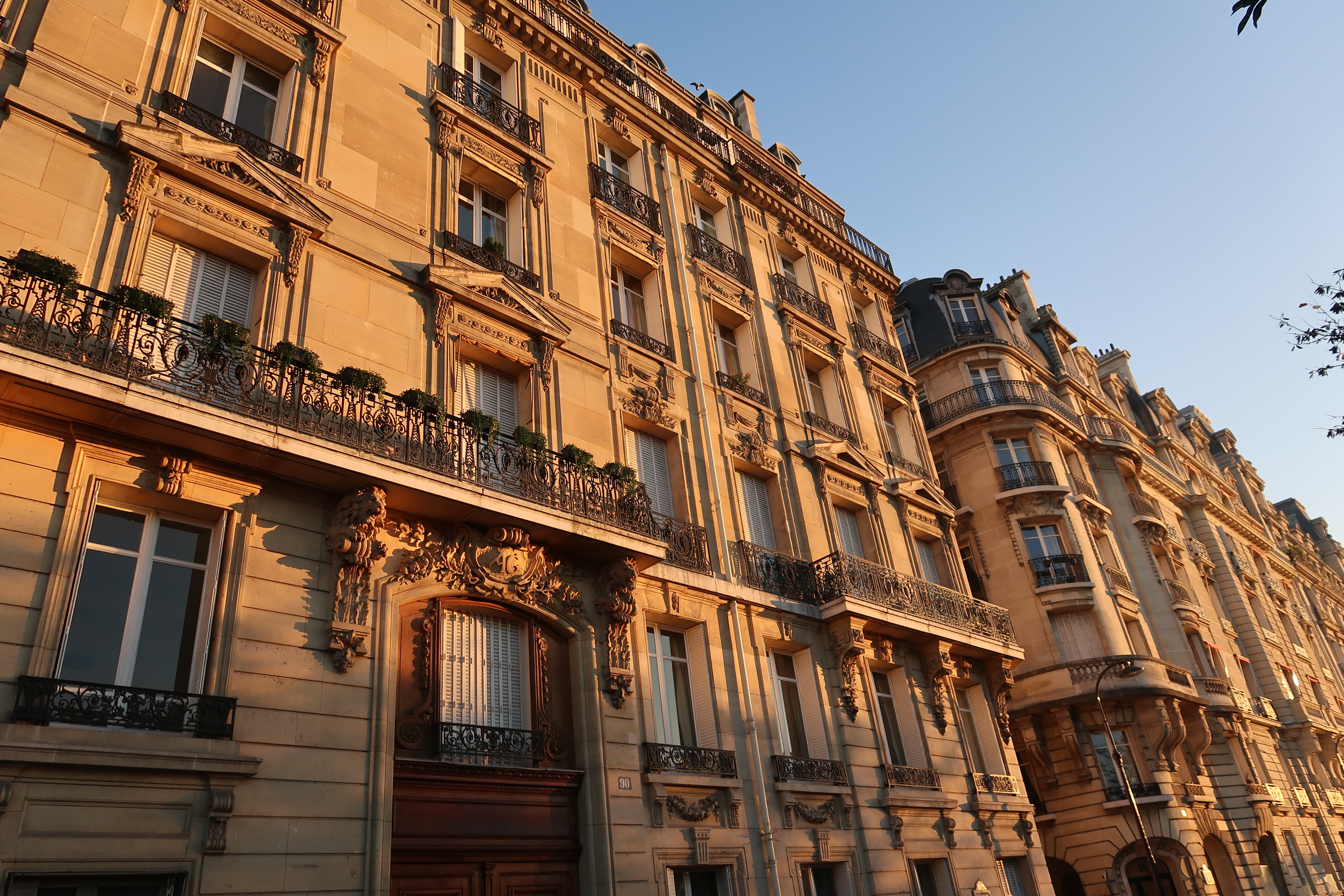
Apartment buildings on Boulevard Flandrin

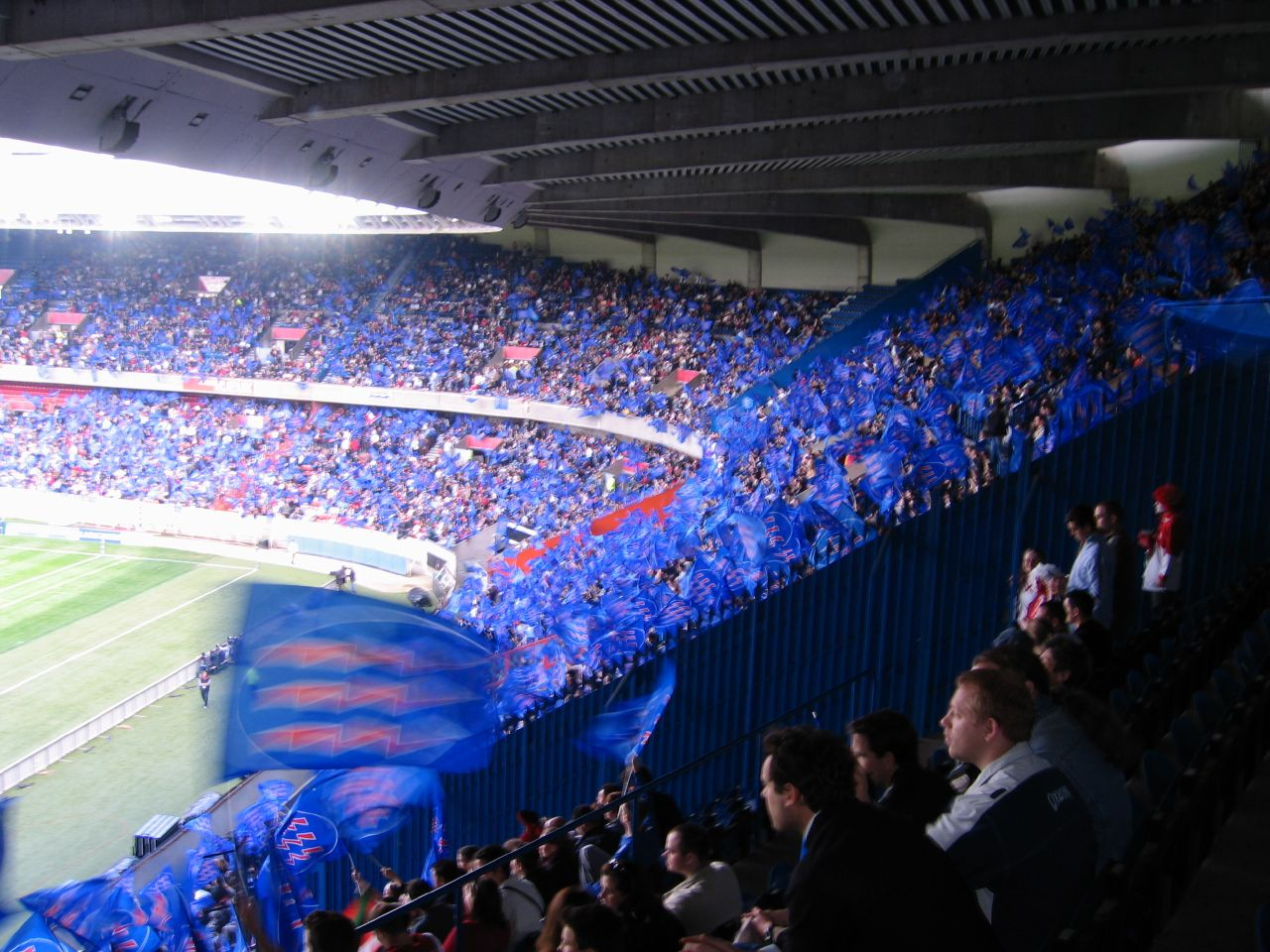
Stade Français rugby union fans at the Parc des Princes

== Demographics ==
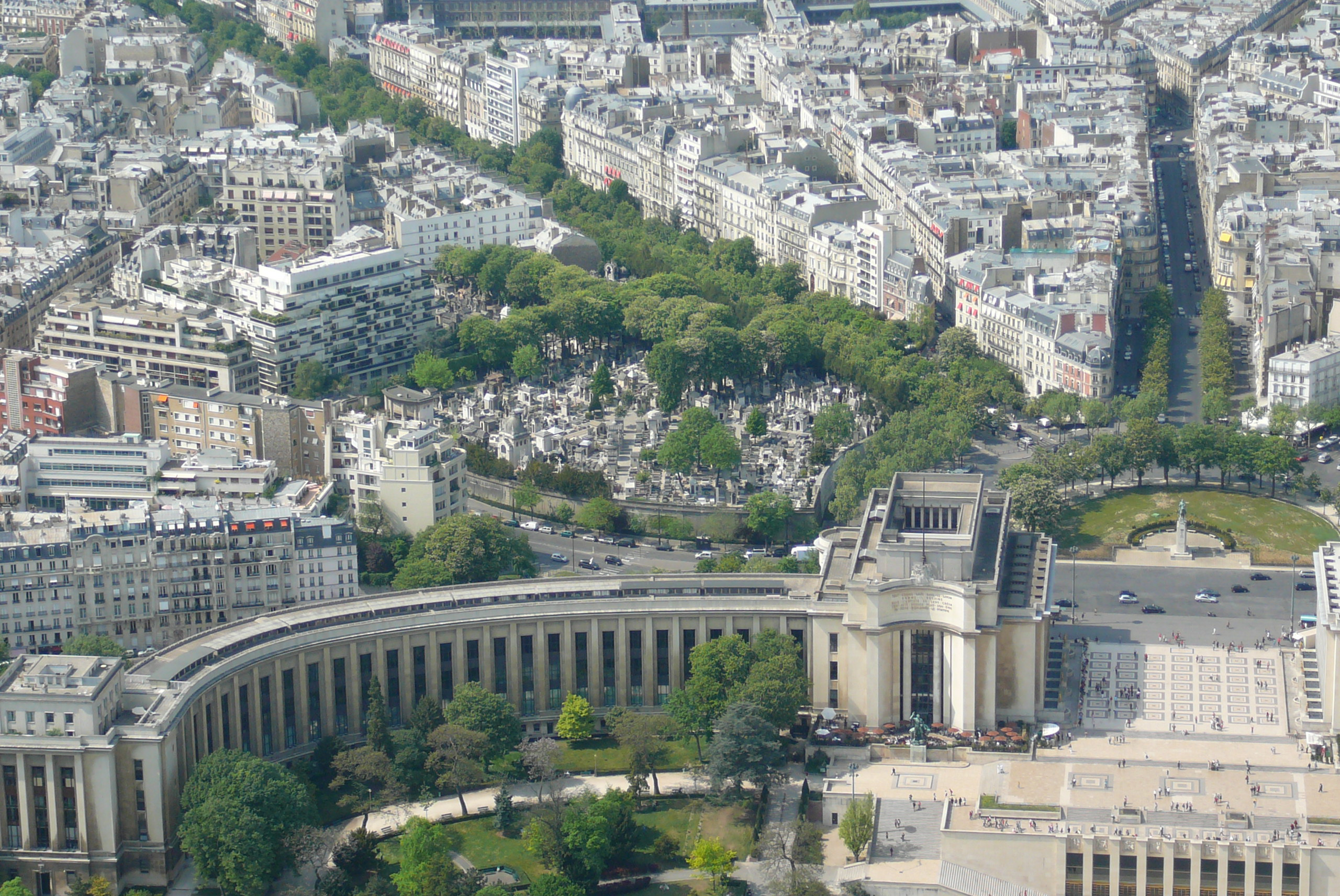
View of the Place du Trocadéro

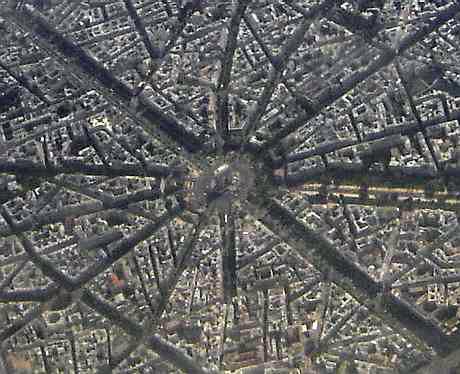
The Place de l'Étoile

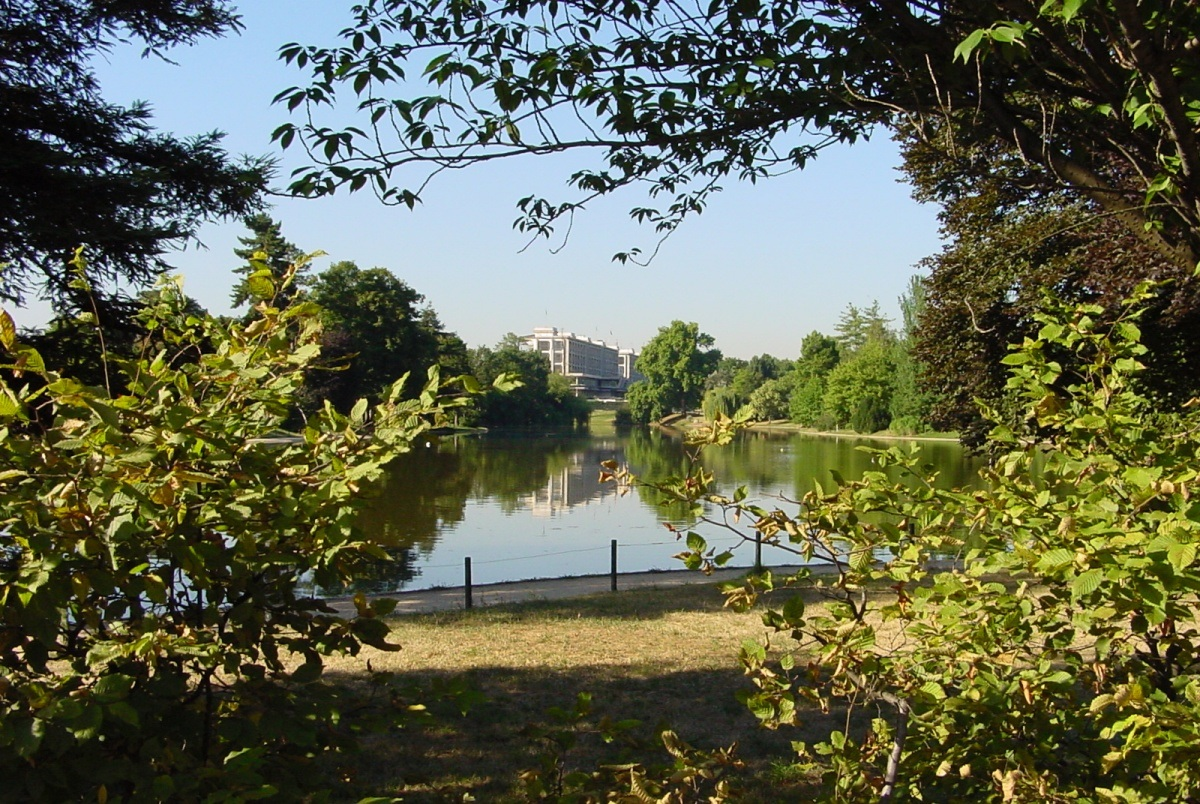
Lac supérieur in the Bois de Boulogne

The population of the 16th arrondissement peaked in 1962, when it had 227,418 inhabitants. The 16th arrondissement contains a great deal of business activity; in 1999 it hosted 106,971 jobs.

The 16th arrondissement is commonly thought to be one of the richest parts of Paris (as the saying Auteuil-Neuilly-Passy popularised); it features some of the most expensive real estate in France including the famous Auteuil "villas"; (Note: The foremost Auteuil villas are: Villa Montmorency, Hameau Boileau, Villa de la Réunion and Villa Victorien Sardou; all of which are inhabited by some of France's wealthiest and most famous citizens including First Lady Carla Bruni (and President Nicolas Sarkozy) or multibillionaires Vincent Bolloré, Arnaud Lagardère, Dominique Desseigne and Alain Afflelou and famous singers Mylène Farmer and Sylvie Vartan) heirs to 19th century high-society country houses, they are exclusive gated communities with huge houses surrounded by gardens, which is extremely rare in Paris. It is also the only arrondissement in Paris to be divided into two separate postal codes. The southern part of the arrondissement carries a postal code of 75016, while the northern part has the code of 75116.

=== Historical population ===
Historical population

Year	Pop.	±% p.a.
1861	36,728	—
1872	43,332	+1.51%
1881	62,876	+4.22%
1891	89,226	+3.56%
1901	121,131	+3.10%
1911	150,174	+2.17%
1921	162,819	+0.81%
1931	176,868	+0.83%
1936	189,571	+1.40%
1946	197,732	+0.42%
1954	214,042	+1.00%

Year	Pop.	±% p.a.
1962	227,418	+0.76%
1968	214,120	−1.00%
1975	193,590	−1.43%
1982	179,446	−1.08%
1990	169,863	−0.68%
1999	161,773	−0.54%
2007	159,706	−0.16%
2012	167,613	+0.97%
2017	166,361	−0.15%
2023	159,386	−0.71%

Source: Demographia (1861-1999) and INSEE (1876-2023)

=== Immigration ===
Place of birth of residents of the 16th arrondissement in 1999
Born in metropolitan France	Born outside metropolitan France			
74.5%	25.5%			
74.5%	Born in overseas France	Born in foreign countries with French citizenship at birth^{1}	EU-15 immigrants^{2}	Non-EU-15 immigrants
74.5%	0.6%	5.7%	6.7%	12.5%
^{1} This group is made up largely of former French settlers, such as pieds-noirs in Northwest Africa, followed by former colonial citizens who had French citizenship at birth (such as was often the case for the native elite in French colonies), as well as to a lesser extent foreign-born children of French expatriates. A foreign country is understood as a country not part of France in 1999, so a person born for example in 1950 in Algeria, when Algeria was an integral part of France, is nonetheless listed as a person born in a foreign country in French statistics.^{2} An immigrant is a person born in a foreign country not having French citizenship at birth. An immigrant may have acquired French citizenship since moving to France, but is still considered an immigrant in French statistics. On the other hand, persons born in France with foreign citizenship (the children of immigrants) are not listed as immigrants.

== Politics ==
The 16th arrondissement used to be one of the strongest areas in the country for the French political right. At the 2017 French presidential election, for example, it gave over 58% of its votes in the first round to right-wing candidate François Fillon, compared to his national result of 20%.

However, after the political realignment in French politics in the late 2010s, which saw emerging polarization between Emmanuel Macron’s centrist coalition and the populist-right National Rally, the 16th began breaking for Macronist parties like En Marche! and Renaissance by large margins. Both of the arrondissement’s current representatives in the National Assembly, for instance, are from Renaissance.

Election	Winning candidate	Party	%
2022	Emmanuel Macron	EM	81,90
2017	Emmanuel Macron	EM	87.37
2012	Nicolas Sarkozy	UMP	78.01
2007	Nicolas Sarkozy	UMP	80.81
2002	Jacques Chirac	RPR	87.99
1981	Valéry Giscard d'Estaing	UDF	76.58

== Economy ==
Notable companies that have their head offices in the arrondissement include Lacoste, PSA Peugeot Citroën and Lagardère.

At one time Aérospatiale, Technip, Veolia and Lafarge also had their head offices in the arrondissement.

== Filming location ==
In one of the opening scenes of the 1965 James Bond film Thunderball, character Emilio Largo is seen arriving at the headquarters of The International Brotherhood for the Assistance of Stateless Persons. This scene was shot on Avenue d'Eylau in the 16th arrondissement.

The 1972 film Last Tango in Paris was filmed at various locations in the 16th arrondissement, with the apartment the characters stayed in being located in Passy.

A scene of the 2018 action film Mission: Impossible – Fallout was filmed under the elevated Métro station Passy in the arrondissement. Other scenes of the film included ones shot at the Grand Palais (8th arrondissement) and under the Cité de la mode et du design on the Seine (13th arrondissement).

Several scenes of the Netflix series Emily in Paris were filmed in the 16th arrondissement of Paris. The district's residential streets and characteristic Haussmannian architecture were used as filming locations for the show.

== Education ==
=== Primary and secondary schools ===
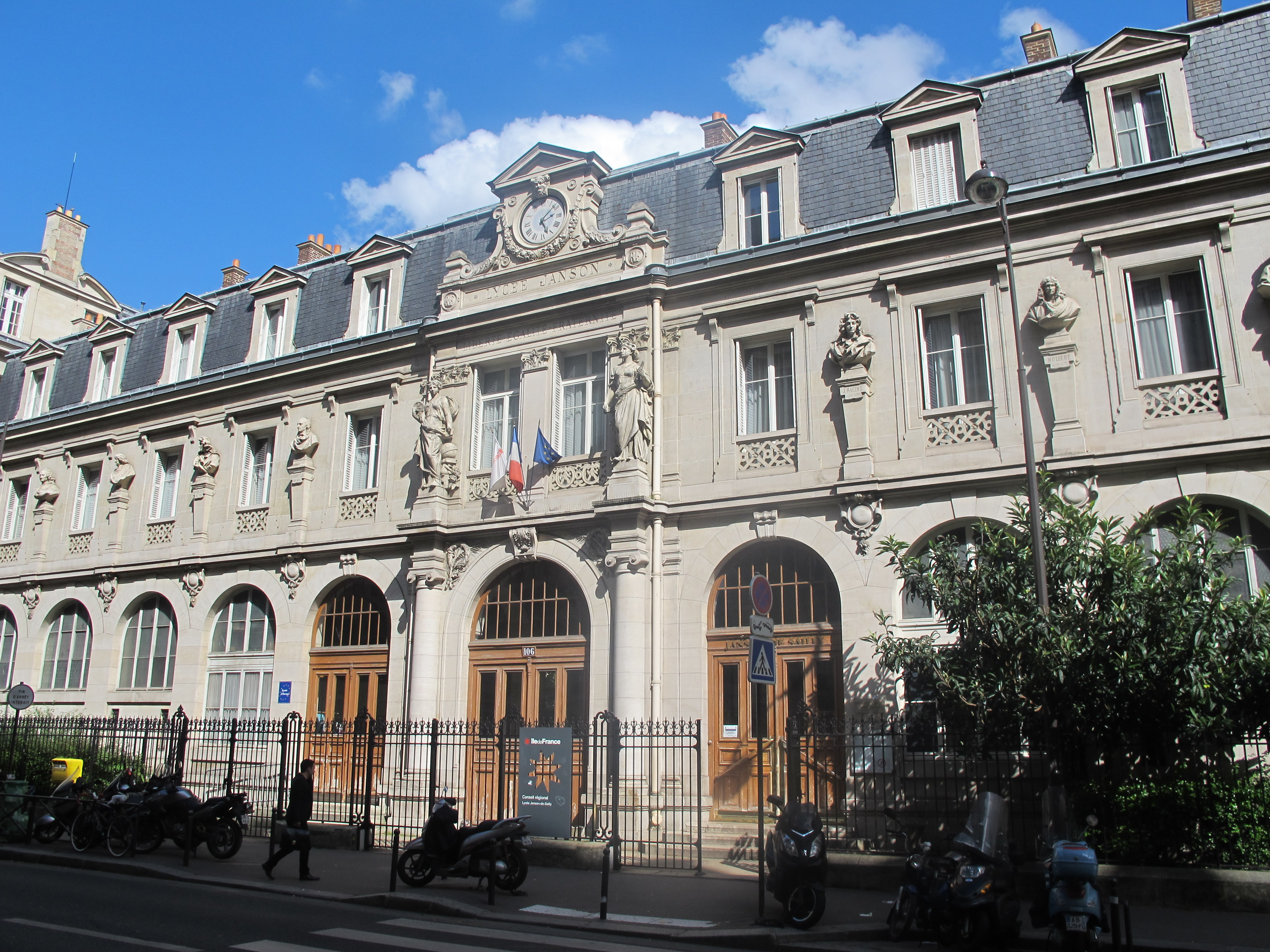
Lycée Janson-de-Sailly

Here is a list of domestic French sixth-form colleges/high schools in the arrondissement

- Lycée Saint-Jean de Passy
- Lycée Saint-Louis-de-Gonzague
- Lycée Janson-de-Sailly
- Lycée Claude-Bernard
- Lycée Jean-Baptiste-Say
- Lycée Gerson
- Lycée Molière
- Lycée La Fontaine (Lycée Jean-de-la-Fontaine)
- Lycée Octave-Feuillet
- Lycée Notre-Dame des Oiseaux
- École Pascal
- Institut de l'Assomption
- Institut de La Tour
- Lycée René-Cassin
- École normale israélite orientale (Paris) (fr
- Établissement Gerson
- Cours privé Beauséjour
- École d'esthétique Yves Rocher
- Ipécom Paris
- Lycée Moria-Diane Benvenuti
- Lycée Passy-Saint-Honoré
- Lycée Sainte-Thérèse

International schools:

- Russian Embassy School of Paris, on the grounds of the Russian Embassy in Paris.
- Colegio Español Federico García Lorca, a Spanish international primary school owned by the Spanish government The Spanish secondary school, Liceo Español Luis Buñuel, is located in Neuilly sur Seine.
- The two campuses of the International School of Paris
- Kingsworth International School

=== Undergraduate and postgraduate studies ===
The Paris Dauphine University is in the arrondissement, as well as Paris Institute of Technology, part of Paris Cité University, one of Paris biggest public universities.

The renowned "classes préparatoires" establishment Intégrale : Institut d'enseignement supérieur privé have one of their campuses in the arrondissement.

=== Supplementary schools ===
The École de langue japonaise de Paris (パリ日本語補習校 Pari Nihongo Hoshūkō), a supplementary Japanese education programme, is held at the École Maternelle et Primaire Saint Francois d'Eylau in the 16th arrondissement. The school has its offices at the Association Amicale des Ressortissants Japonais en France (AARJF) in the 8th arrondissement.

== Cityscape ==
=== Neighbourhoods ===
- Auteuil
- Chaillot
- Passy

=== Places of interest ===
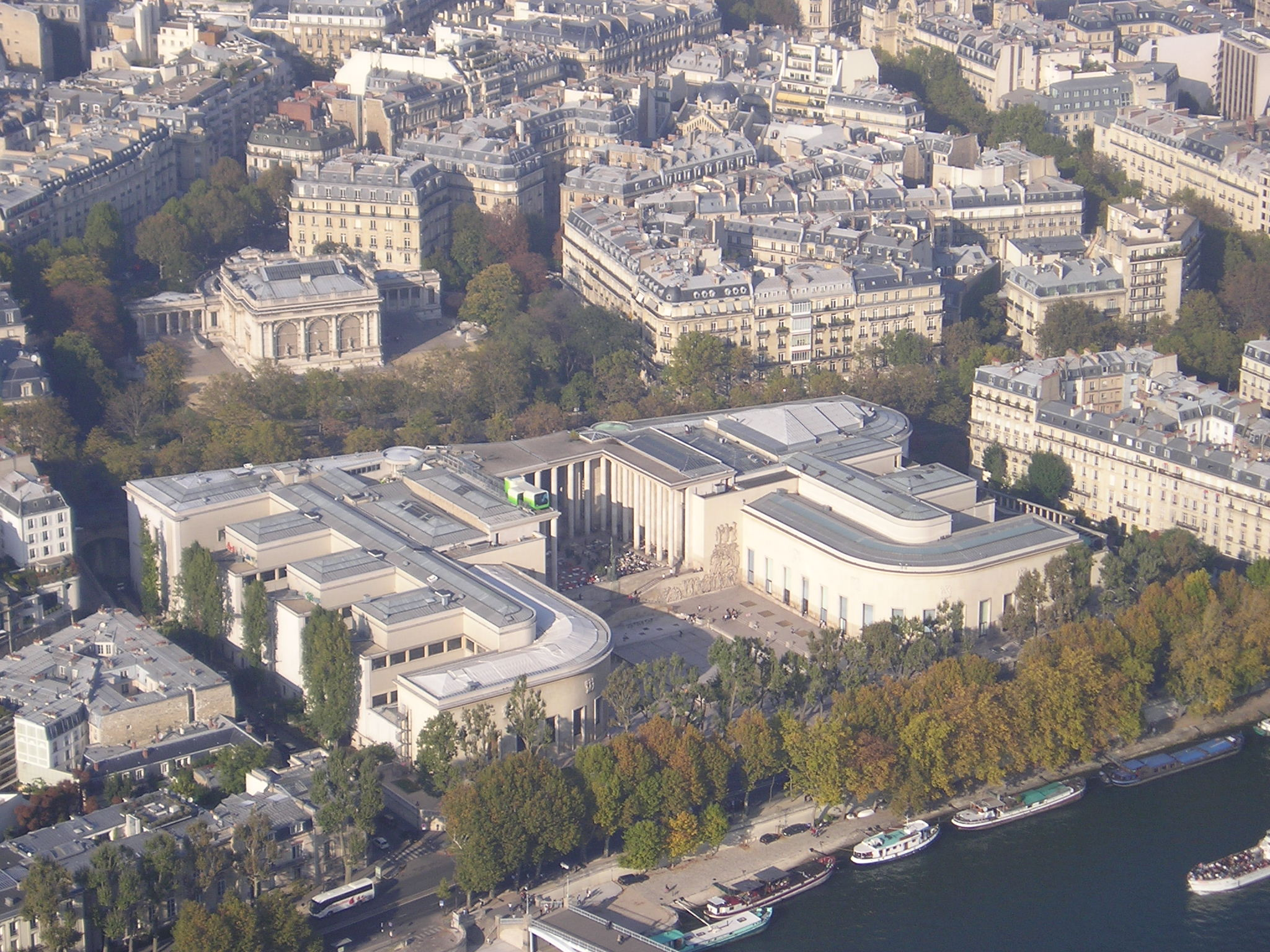
View of the Palais de Tokyo, Museum of Contemporary Art (left) and Paris Museum of Modern Art (right)

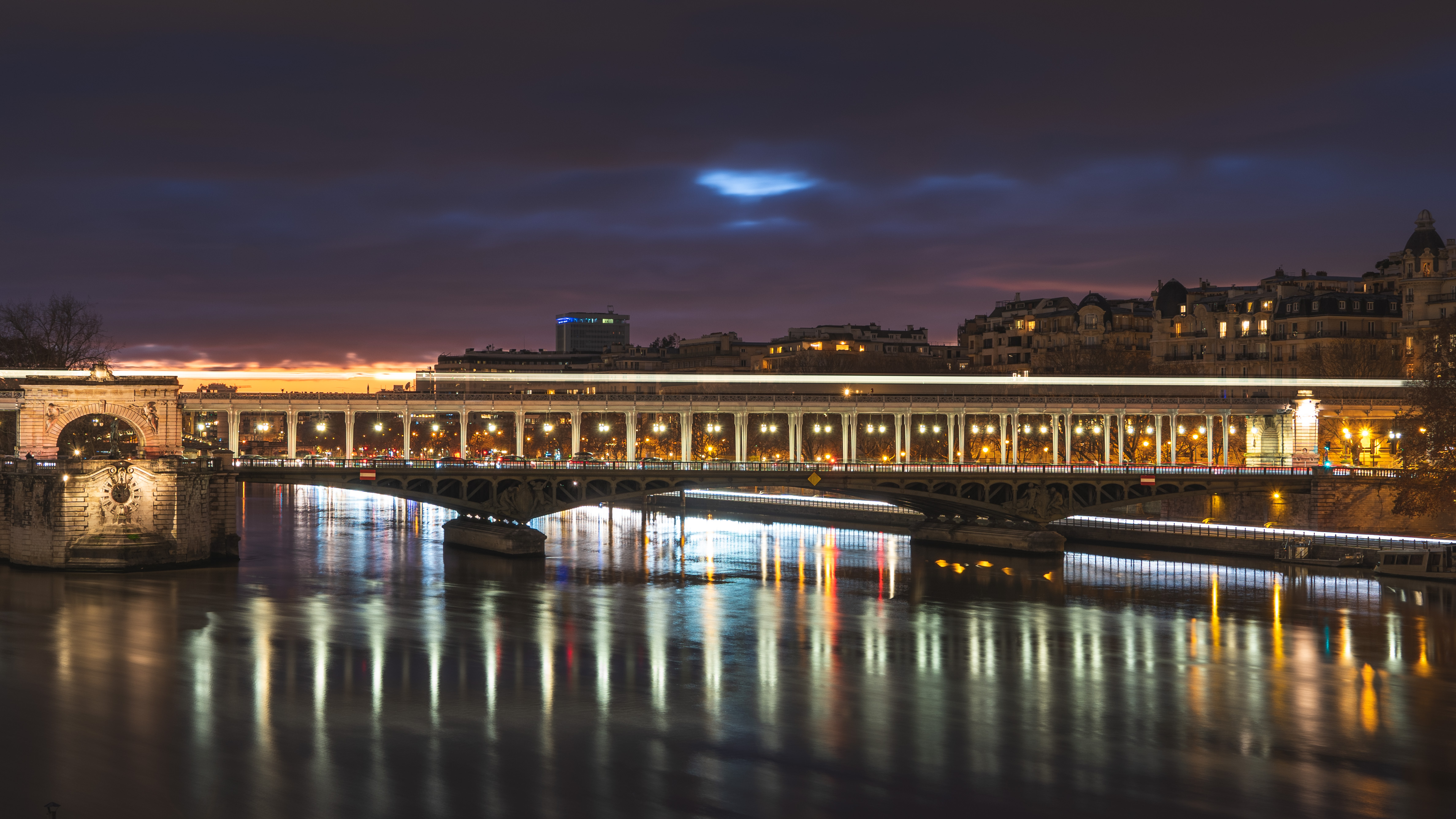
The Pont de Bir-Hakeim between the 15th and 16th arrondissements

- Louis Vuitton Foundation
- Cimetière de Passy
- Parc des Princes
- Palais de Tokyo
- Pavillon de l'eau
- Lycée Janson-de-Sailly
- Maison de Radio France
- Maison de Balzac
- Fondation Le Corbusier
- Guimet Museum
- Saint Honore d'Eylau church
- Jardin d'Acclimatation
- Jardin des Serres d'Auteuil
- Mona Bismarck American Center
- Musée Arménien de France
- Musée d'Art Dentaire Pierre Fauchard
- Musée Baccarat
- Musée Clemenceau
- Musée de la Contrefaçon
- Musée d'Ennery
- Musée Galliera
- Musée Marmottan Monet
- Musée Yves Saint Laurent Paris
- New York University's distinguished Paris campus
- Organisation for Economic Co-operation and Development
- Ohel Abraham Synagogue
- Château de la Muette
- International School of Paris
- Tenniseum

=== Main streets and squares ===
- Trocadéro
  - Musée national de la Marine
  - Musée de l'Homme
  - Musée national des Monuments Français
  - Musée du Cinéma Henri Langlois
  - Théâtre national de Chaillot
- Avenue Foch
  - 84 Avenue Foch
- Place de l'Étoile and Arc de Triomphe (partial)
- Rue Nungesser et Coli, named after the disappeared aviators of the 1927 biplane L'Oiseau Blanc (The White Bird).
  - avenue Bugeaud
- Place de la Porte-de-Saint-Cloud

== See also ==
- The Seizième a variation on the Manhattan cocktail made with Calvados instead of rye whiskey.
- Trocadéro Palace
