= Juvin =

Juvin is a surname. Notable people with the surname include:

- Hervé Juvin (born 1956), French essayist and politician
- Philippe Juvin (born 1964), French medical doctor and politician
- Robert Juvin (1921–2005), French sculptor
