= Empress Theatre (Montreal) =

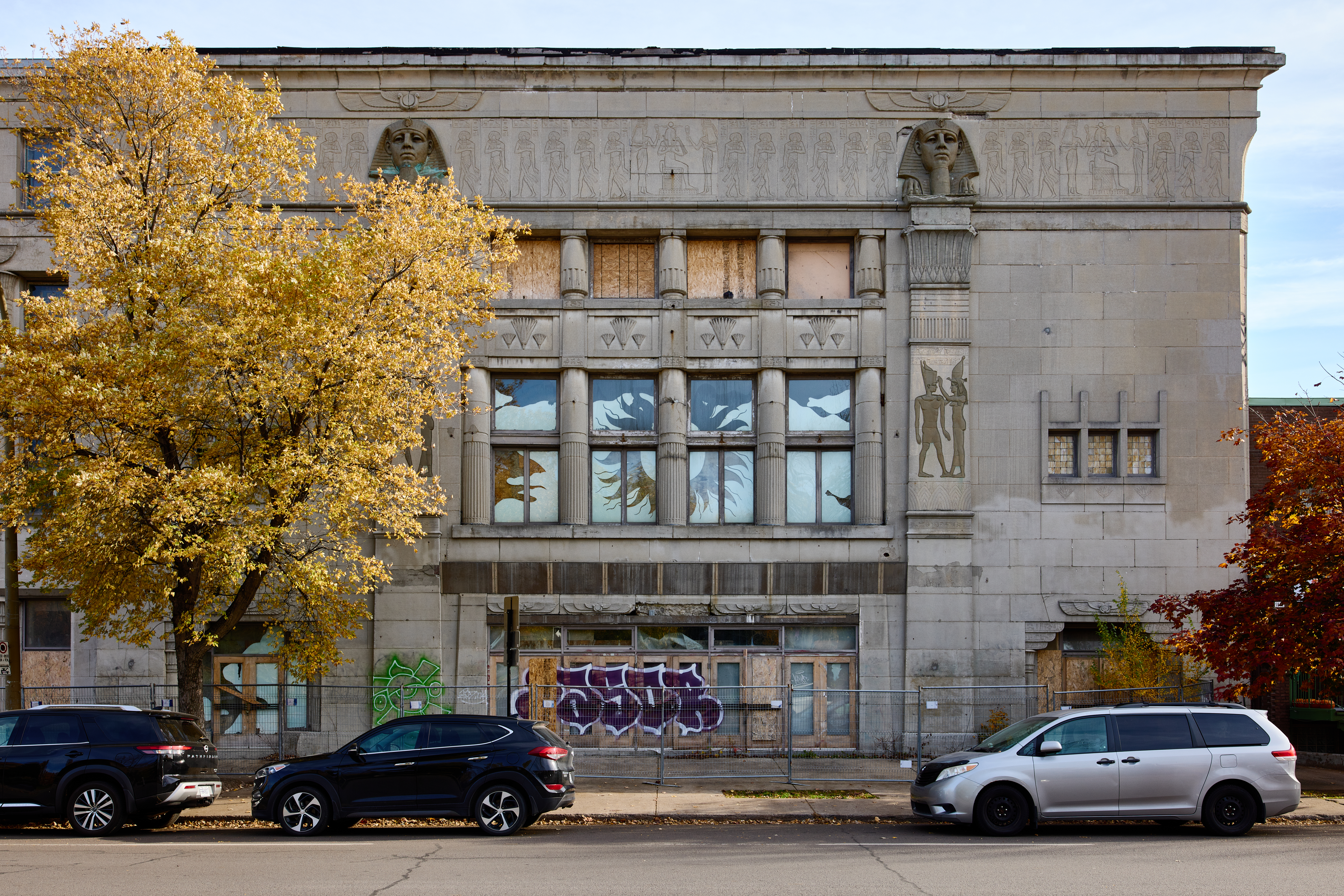
- Empress Theatre on Sherbrooke Street in Notre-Dame-de-Grâce on 28 October 2022
- Interactive map of the Empress Theatre area
- Alternative names: Cinema V

General information
- Type: Movie theatre
- Architectural style: Egyptian Revival architecture
- Location: Montreal, Quebec, Canada, 5560 Sherbrooke Street
- Coordinates: 45.4718°N 73.6129°W
- Inaugurated: 1927
- Owner: City of Montreal

Design and construction
- Architect: Joseph-Alcide Chaussé
- Other designers: Emmanuel Briffa

The Empress Theatre (also known as Cinema V), is an abandoned Egyptian Revival style theatre located on Sherbrooke Street west in the Notre-Dame-de-Grâce district of Montreal, Quebec, Canada. After operating for 65 years, the theater closed in 1992.

== History ==
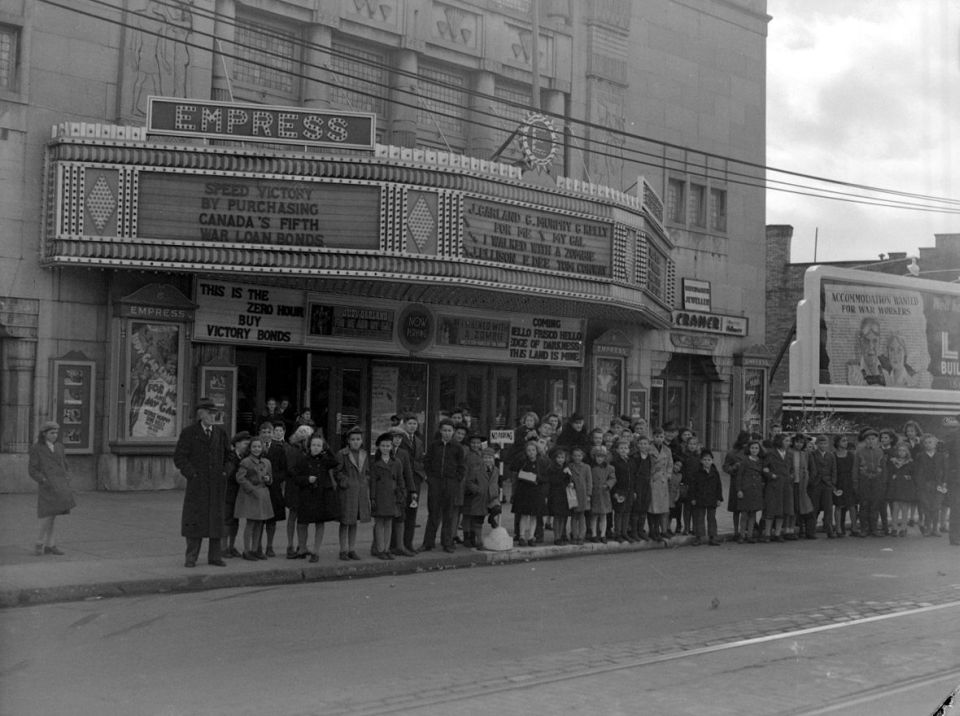
Empress Theatre in 1943 (during World War II era).

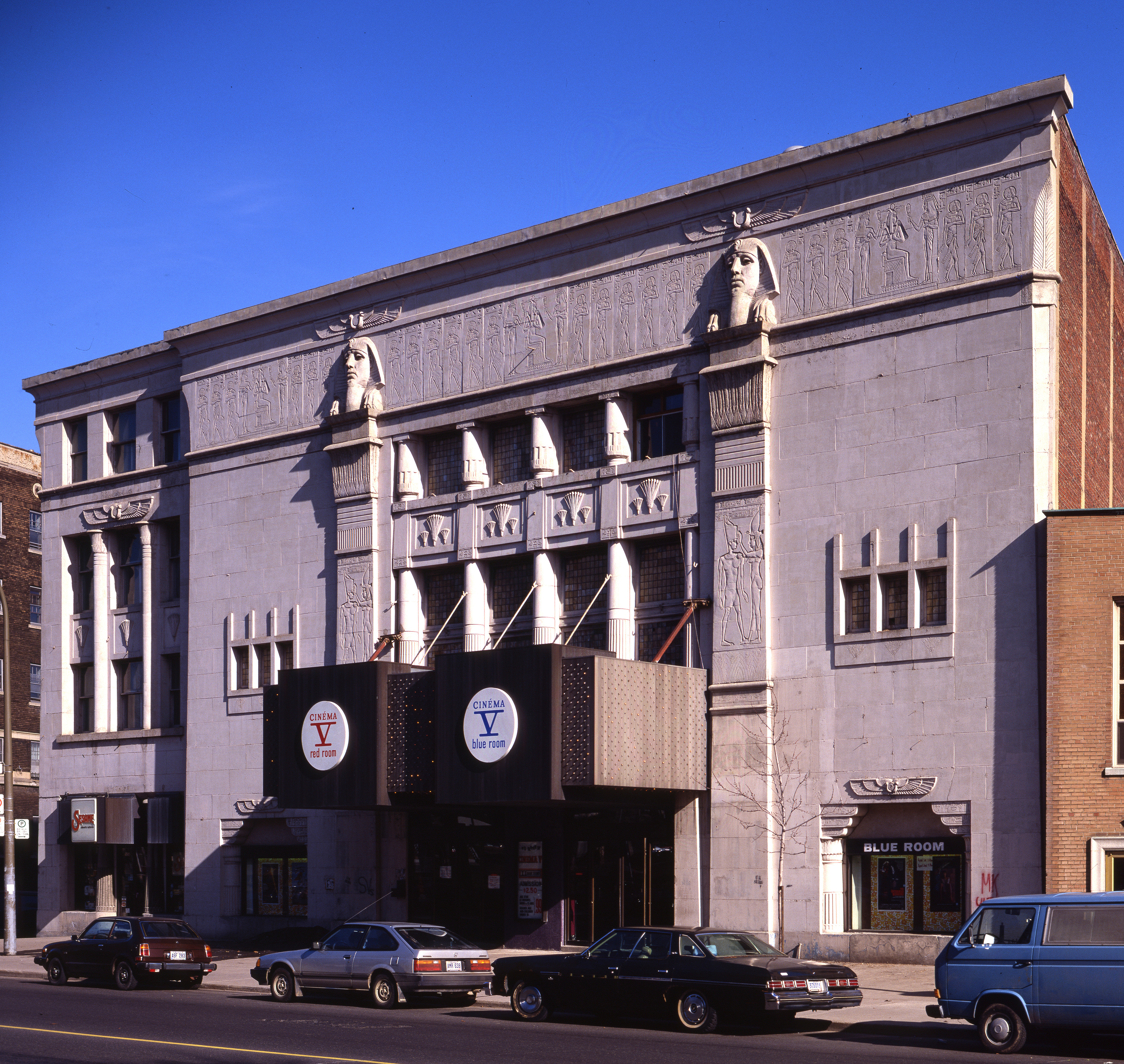
Cinema V in 1982.

The theater was designed by Joseph-Alcide Chaussé, with interiors by Emmanuel Briffa, and built in 1927. It is the only theatre in Canada designed in the Egyptian style (inspired by the discovery of Tutankhamen's tomb).

In 1928 it opened as the Empress Theatre, the building was a vaudeville theatre for burlesque and first-run films.

In 1965, it was a cabaret called the Royal Follies.

In 1968 it became a two-tiered art-movie cinema known as Cinema V and Salle Hermes.

In 1974 it was briefly named The Home of the Blue Movies.

In 1975 it became simply Cinema V, a repertory cinema.

In 1988 it was acquired by Famous Players and showed first-run films.

In 1992 a fire caused damage to the theater resulting in its permanent closure.

== Failed restoration plans ==
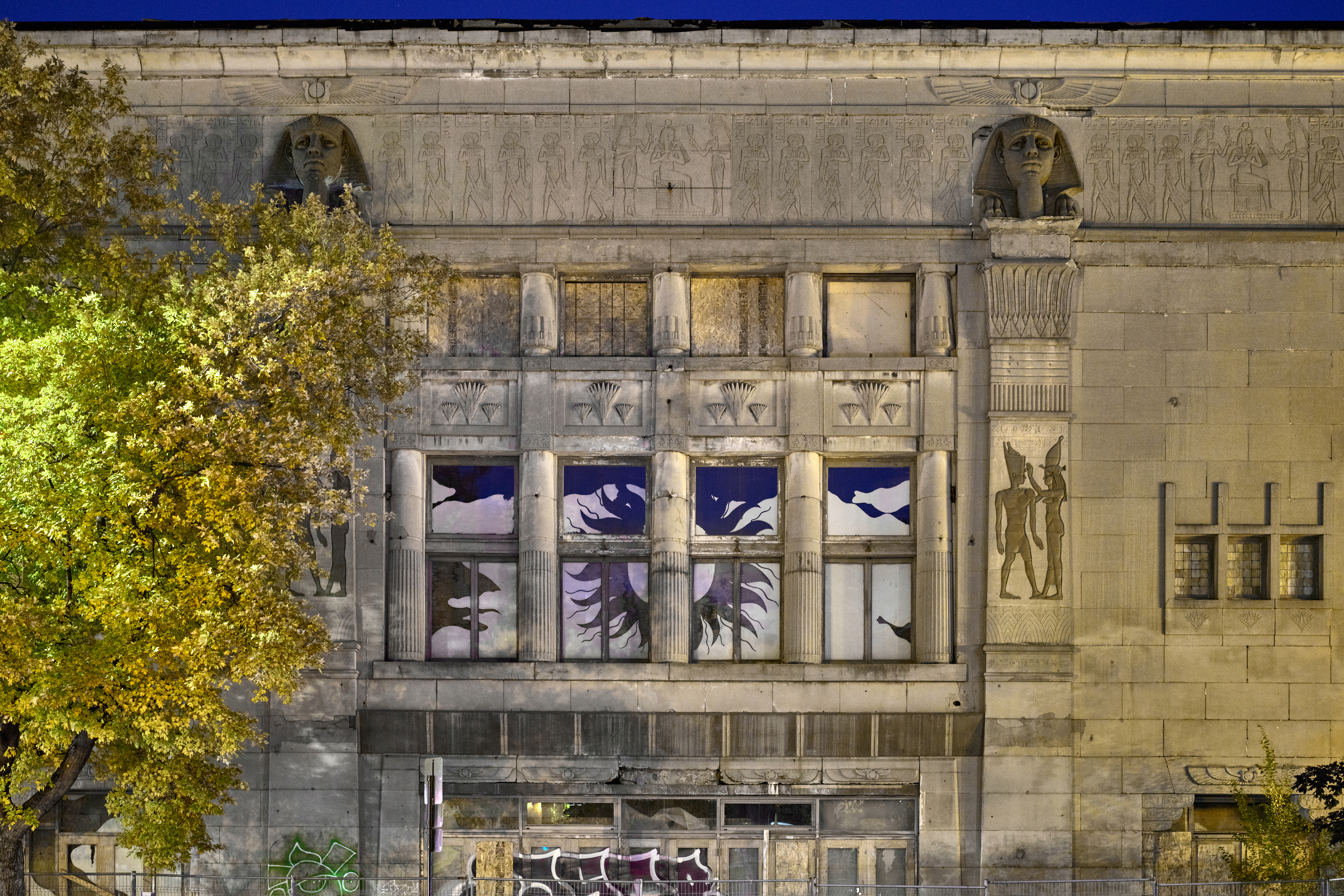
Empress Theatre in October 2022

=== Geordie-BTW-McGill ===
In November 2009, after several unsuccessful attempts to revive the theater over the years, Geordie Productions , Black Theatre Workshop, McGill Music Conservatory and the City of Montreal (who took ownership of the building in 1999) announced plans to restore the building. The estimated cost was $11.8 million. The theatre was to be used for performance and visual arts and included a cafe/art gallery and a 246-person concert hall. It was to be home to Geordie Productions and Black Theatre Workshop, and the McGill Conservatory had planned to use the theatre for its music program.

In August 2010, the provincial government pulled funding and announced ownership would be returned to the city of Montreal by November. Residents of NDG formed Renaissance Empress, a group dedicated to preserving the theatre and transforming it into a cultural centre, and delayed the move. On August 15, 2011, the NDG borough seized ownership, effectively canceling the project.

=== Cinema NDG ===
In January 2012, the borough of N.D.G. announced that any non-profit group with a new plan for the building should present it by May 11, 2012. The city stated that it would not provide any funding for the building.

On September 5, 2012, the borough voted to accept Cinema NDG's proposal. Their plan was to open a movie theater with four screening rooms and set aside 20% of the building for commercial use. Restoration of the building was estimated at $12 million. Cinema NDG was given until December 31, 2013, to find financial backing, but failed to meet the deadline. Two extensions were granted during 2014 and 2015, but Cinema NDG failed to meet these as well. On November 2, 2015, the city voted to grant a third and final extension, for June 30, 2016, but yet again Cinema NDG failed to meet the deadline, forfeiting the project.

In late September 2016, in hope of a new start, Cinema NDG submitted a revised and scaled back plan to the city, bringing the estimate cost down to $9.5 million. However, the city did not show willingness to accept a new plan, and furthermore stated under no circumstance would it transfer ownership of the building unless Cinema NDG could prove it had secured 100% of the funding. Meanwhile, other cinemas continued to close in Montreal and throughout North America, including the Montreal cinema and performing arts centre Excentris in November 2015.

=== MK2 ===
In October 2017, a new citizens formed group was announced: Friends of the Empress. Expressing an interest in reopening the theater, the group called for more transparency and public consultations for the project. It also proposed a pop-up sidewalk stand to solicit the opinions of residents. These efforts were thwarted by the Cinema NDG group, which accused the Friends of the Empress group of playing politics for trying to make the process more democratic. A week later, without any consultation with local stakeholders, the French film company MK2 signed a letter of intent to partner with Cinema NDG (now known as Empress Theater Foundation) to run an 880-seat cinema out of the building, with 5 rooms, a restaurant, a bar and a coffee shop. However, no financial details had been set, nor had the city made any new agreement. Efforts by the Friends of the Empress to obtain information about the contract were denied by local councillors.

In August 2018, it had been reported MK2 cut ties with the Empress Theater Foundation and withdrew from its agreement. This had left the project to revitalize the theater, yet again, to fall apart and ultimately fail.

== Current state ==
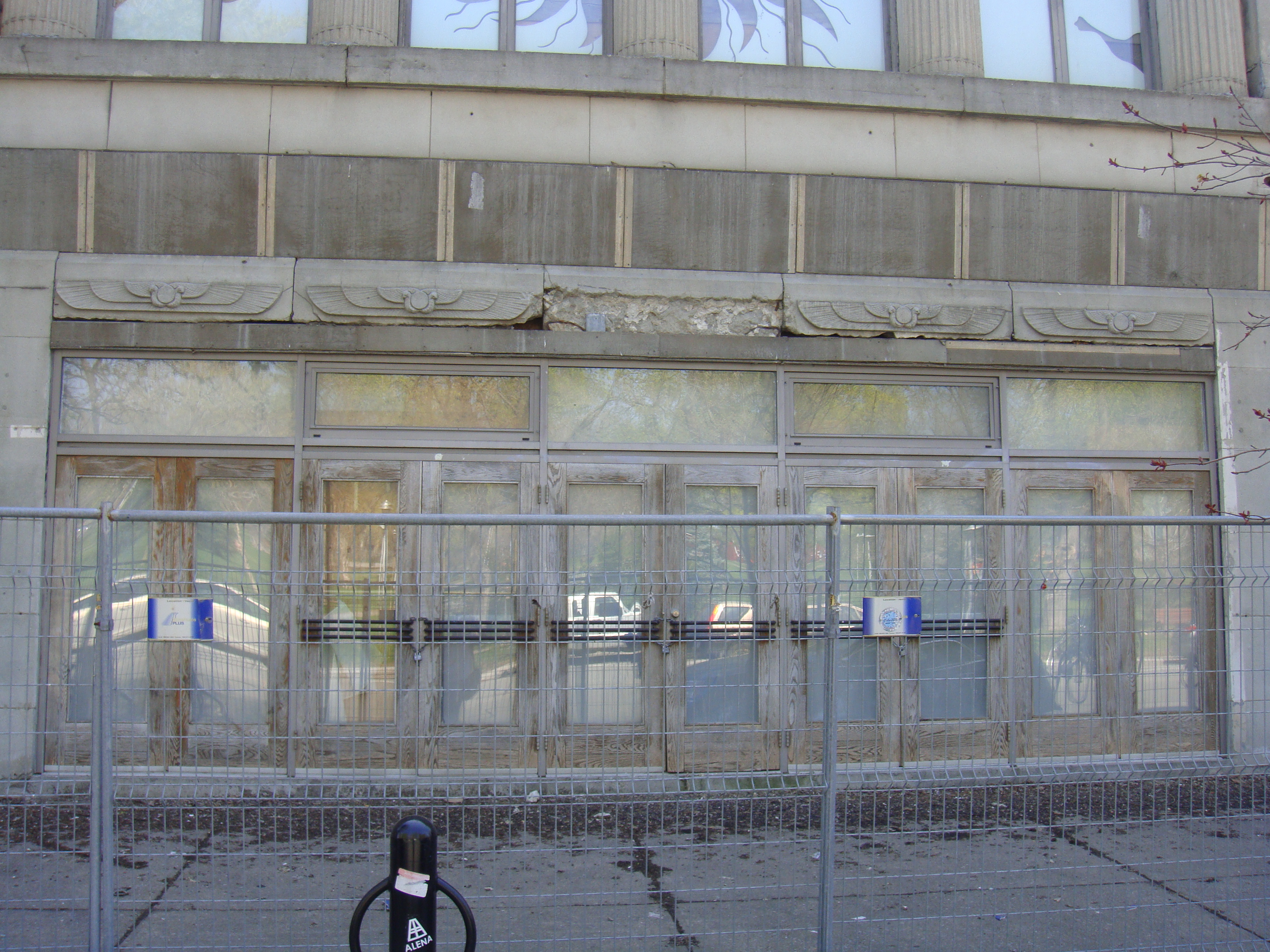
Empress Theatre in May 2015

The abandoned building is deteriorating and its perimeter fenced off. Although community organizers had temporarily opened a small one room office headquarters on the ground floor in 2005 (left corner of building), it was abandoned again when the city of Montreal forcibly closed it in December 2011. With heating and power later shut off to the vacant space after 2013, it's been left open to further decay and neglect. In the years since, the building has been repeatedly vandalized, windows broken, and covered with graffiti. Following 30 years of neglect and abandonment, the building is now structurally unsound and the roof at risk of collapse. As of August 2023, all the building's windows and doors are now permanently boarded up for long-term abandonment, leaving the former theater to succumb to nature. In 2005, students from Concordia University's Journalism Department made a 15 minute documentary about the theatre.

=== Planned demolition ===
In March 2020, CTV News reported the CDN-NDG city borough planned to demolish the former Empress theater. An audit showed the building structurally unsound, with its concrete degraded and roof at risk of collapse. Its neo-Egyptian exterior facade could be preserved and incorporated into a new building, however its advanced decay and the substantial additional cost questioned its feasibility. Montreal's public housing agency claimed "affordable" housing (condos) would be built in its place, with commercial and community space on the ground floor. The announcement seemingly marked the end of the nearly century old landmark, however, other than being boarded up, it remained untouched and its fate in limbo over the next several years.

In November 2024, it was reported the city of Montreal was preparing to sell the building–potentially backtracking on its demolition, with vague plans once again to redevelop it into a mix of commercial and residential space. Heritage Montreal stated years of neglect and rain infiltration caused the building's poor condition, and immediate action would be needed to save it. However no timeline for its sell or refurbishment was given, again leaving the building in limbo and further decay.

In February 2026, the city borough once again announced plans to demolish the building, but only preserving two walls: the front and side facade (on Sherbrooke and Old Orchard streets, respectively). With a budget of $10 million ear marked, the project's first phase will see the empty space used as a temporary grass-covered courtyard for the public, framed by two walls held up by steel girders. A second phase involves construction of a new building behind the wall facade, replacing the courtyard, but the city has no concrete date or plan. The borough is currently seeking a contractor for the demolition, and hopes for the courtyard to open by October 2027.
