= Ohel Abraham Synagogue, Paris =

Synagogue Ohel Abraham
- Synagogue de la rue de Montevideo
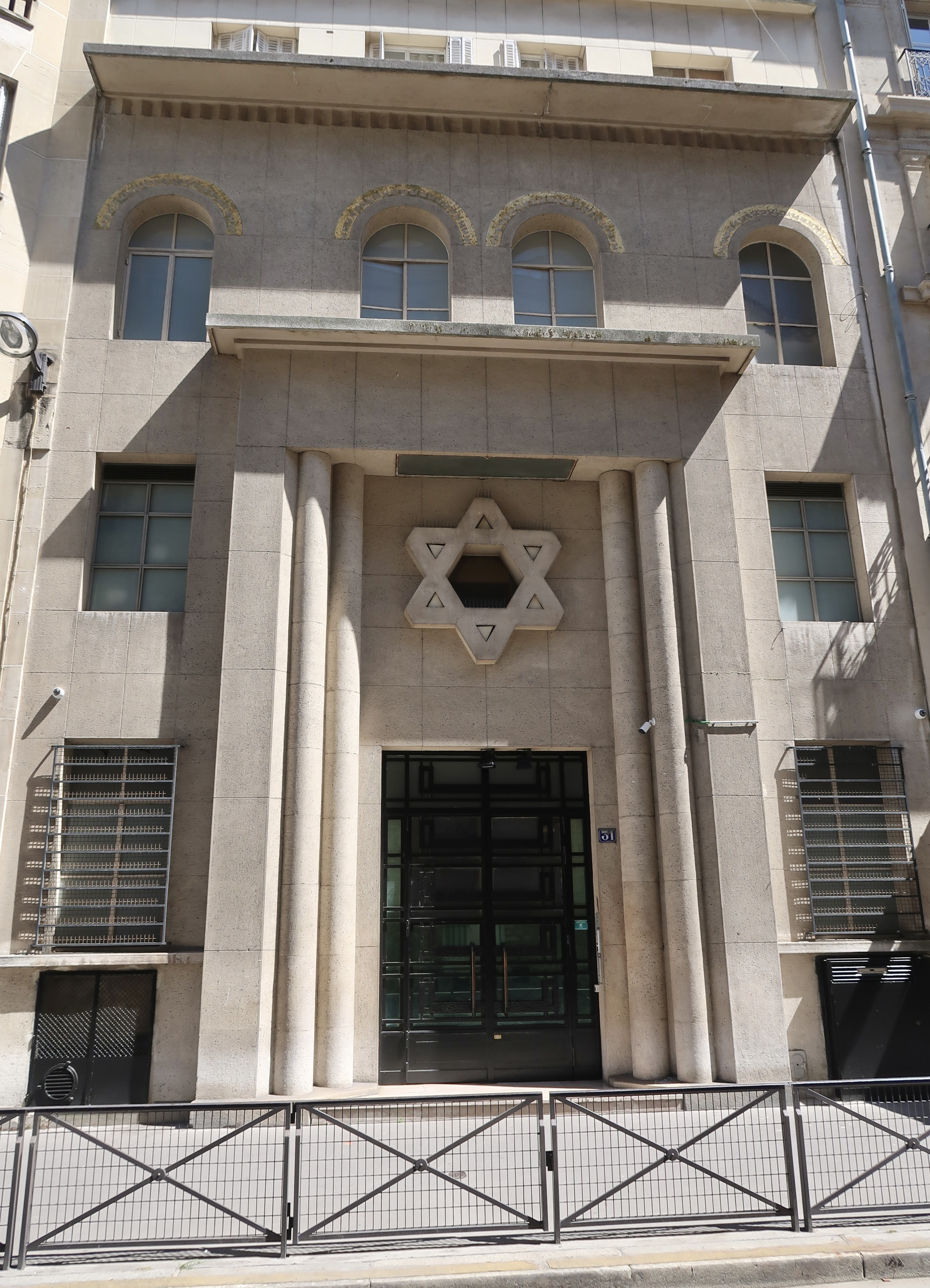

- Location within Paris

Religion
- Affiliation: Orthodox Judaism
- Year consecrated: 1936

Location
- Location: 31 rue de Montevideo
- Municipality: 16th arrondissement, Paris
- Country: France
- Interactive map of Synagogue Ohel Abraham
- Coordinates: 48.8665°N 2.2735°E

The Synagogue on Rue de Montevideo is a Jewish Synagogue in the 16th arrondissement of Paris. Today it is known as Synagogue Ohel Abraham.

== History ==
The community was founded in 1893 under the name the Société du culte traditionnel israélite.

=== Buildings ===
In 1913 a dozen Jewish families bought a hôtel particulier at 31 rue de Montevideo, then called Rue Théry, for their religious site. As the community grew and the space became more cramped, a real synagogue was built in 1936. The ground floor was devoted to men, while the balcony on the first floor was for women. Classrooms and apartments for community members were housed on higher floors. The first stone of the building contained a piece of parchment which featured the names of families who participated in the work. The building was renovated in 1986.

The façade is adorned with an imposing stone Star of David.

In this neighborhood, the community also owns a building at 23 bis, rue Dufrenoy, where the Edmond-Weil Community Center is located. The center is provides social, cultural and leisure activities. The building, donated by Edmond Weil after the Second World War, houses the West Paris branch of the Institut universitaire Elie-Wiesel, a Jewish museum, a Talmud Torah school as well as École Ariel and École Gabriel.

=== Rabbis ===
Originally led by Rabbi Simon Langer, the synagogue was briefly run by Chief Rabbi Charles Touati when Langer escaped France for New York City. Rabbi Jean Schwarz took direction of the community at rue de Montevideo for numerous year, until July 1972, when he was replaced with Rabbi Daniel Gottlieb (1939–2010), who served until December 2002.

Today, the Rabbi is Jacky Milevski and the hazzan is Shmuel Shapiro.

== Bibliography ==
- Dominique Jarassé, Guide du patrimoine juif parisien, Parigramme, 2003.
