= Place de la Porte-de-Saint-Cloud =

Square in the Auteuil district in Paris

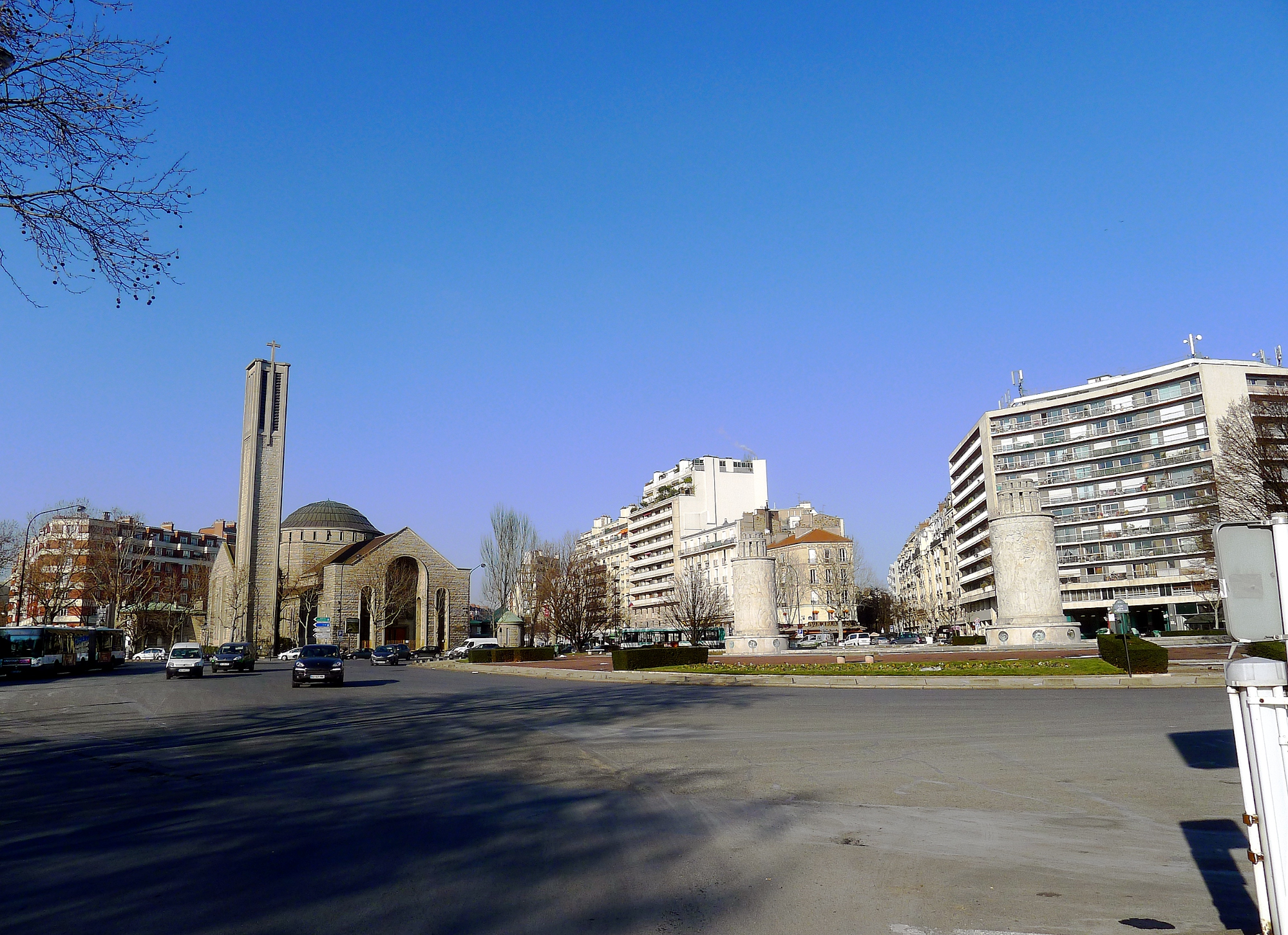
- View of the square
- Type: Square
- Location: 16th arrondissement, Paris, France
- Arrondissement: 16th
- Quarter: Auteuil
- Coordinates: 48°50′17″N 2°15′25″E
- From: Boulevard Murat; Avenue Georges-Lafont
- To: Avenue de la Porte-de-Saint-Cloud; Avenue de Versailles

Construction
- Inauguration: March 4, 1929

The Place de la Porte-de-Saint-Cloud is a thoroughfare in the Auteuil district of Paris's 16th arrondissement.

== Location and access ==
The Place de la Porte-de-Saint-Cloud is served by line 9 at Porte de Saint-Cloud station.

== Origin of name ==
This square is located on the former Porte de Saint-Cloud's site in Thiers' enceinte.

== History ==
The square, created by the City of Paris in 1928 on the site of former bastions nos. 65 and 66, received its current name through a decree of March 4, 1929. A subsequent decree on October 11, 1932, designated it as a Parisian roadway.

At its center, where an octroi barrier once stood, lies the garden of the Porte-de-Saint-Cloud traffic circle, home to the Porte de Saint-Cloud fountains since 1936.

The square has been recognized with the "Patrimoine du XXe siècle" (20th-century heritage) label.

== Buildings and places of remembrance ==
- Sainte-Jeanne-de-Chantal church and garden.
- Three of the four monumental animal statues that had been installed in the gardens of the Trocadero Palace during the 1878 Universal Exhibition were installed on the Place de la Porte-de-Saint-Cloud from 1935 to 1985. These were Pierre Louis Rouillard's Cheval à la Herse, Emmanuel Frémiet's Jeune éléphant pris au piège and Henri-Alfred Jacquemart's Rhinocéros. In 1986, they were restored at the Coubertin Foundation in Saint-Rémy-les-Chevreuse before being installed on the Orsay Museum forecourt.
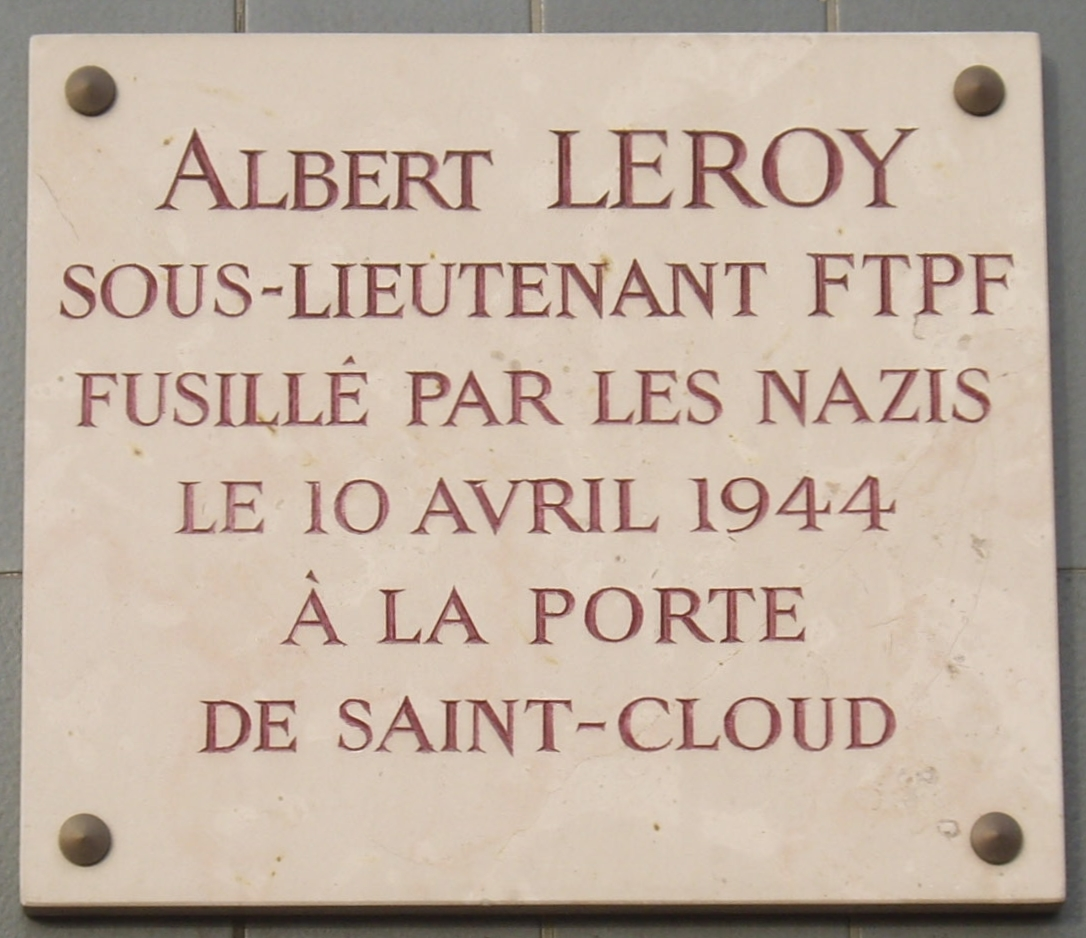
Plaque at no. 6.

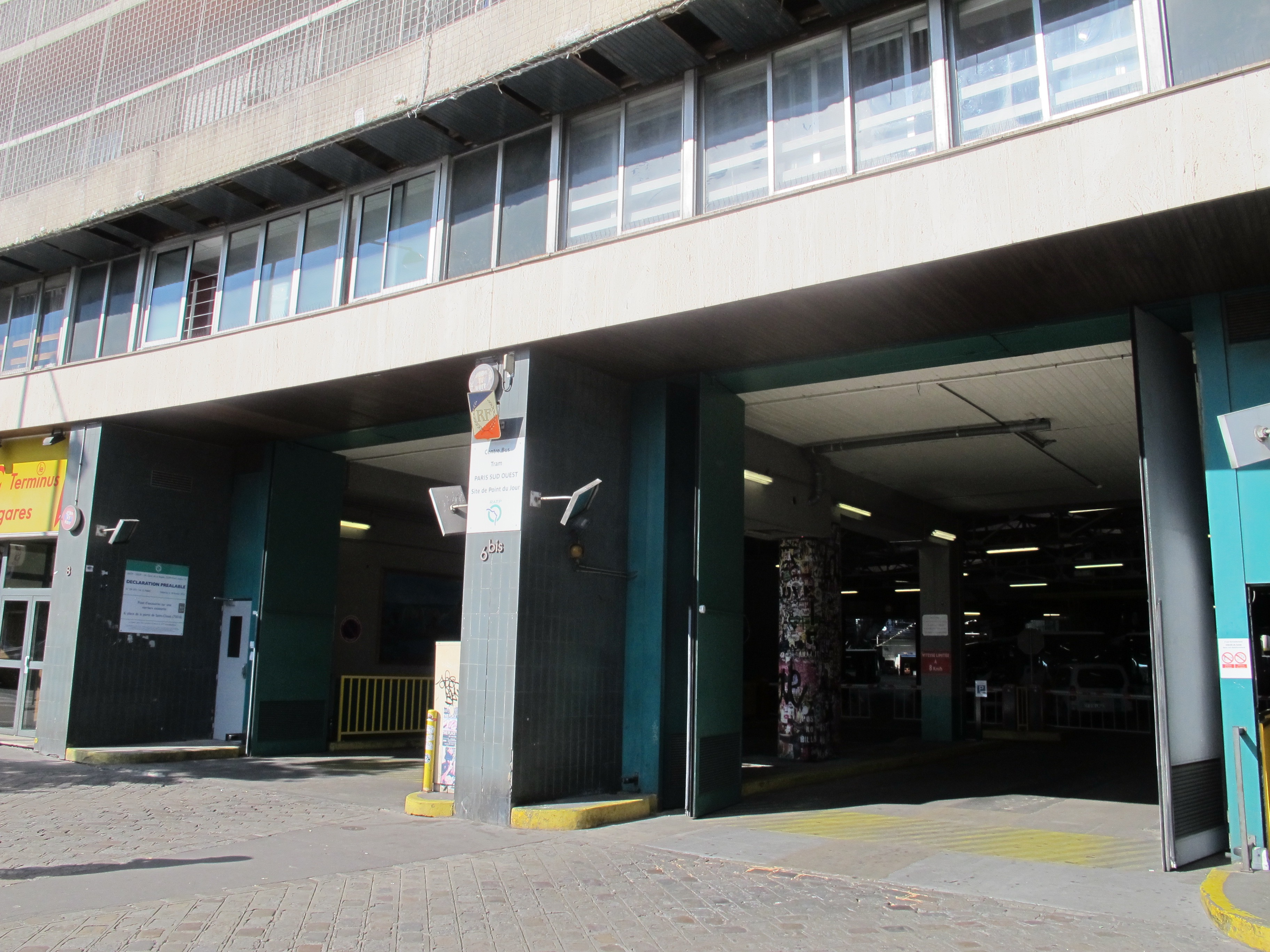
Bus depot at no. 6bis.
