= Julien Barbier =

French architect

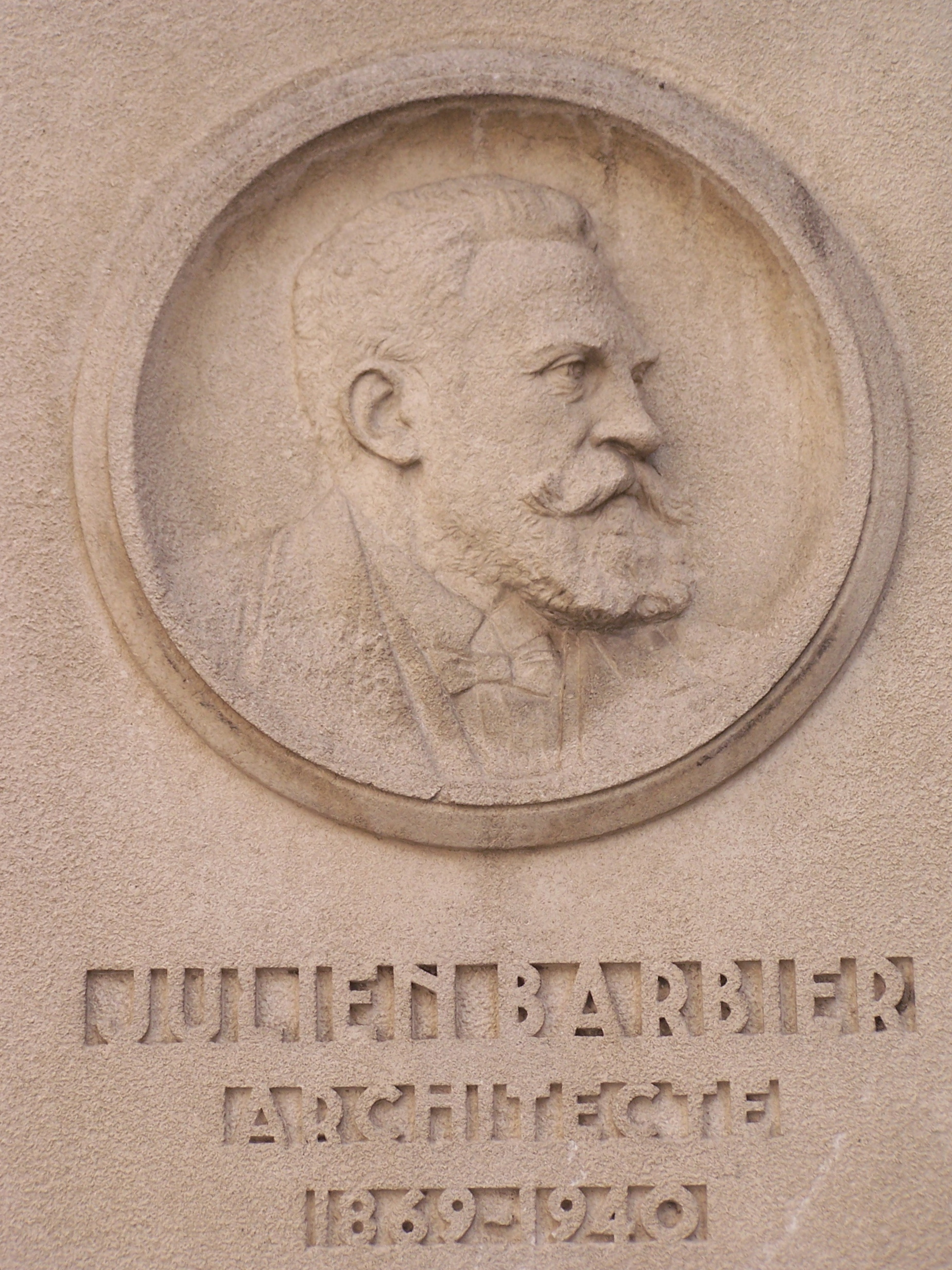
- Bas-relief on the Notre-Dame-des-Otages church in Paris depicting Barbier
- Born: 1869
- Died: 1940 (aged 70–71)
- Occupation: Architect

Julien Barbier was a French architect who specialized in religious architecture.

== Work ==
Notable works include:

- Sacré-Cœur Church, Dijon,

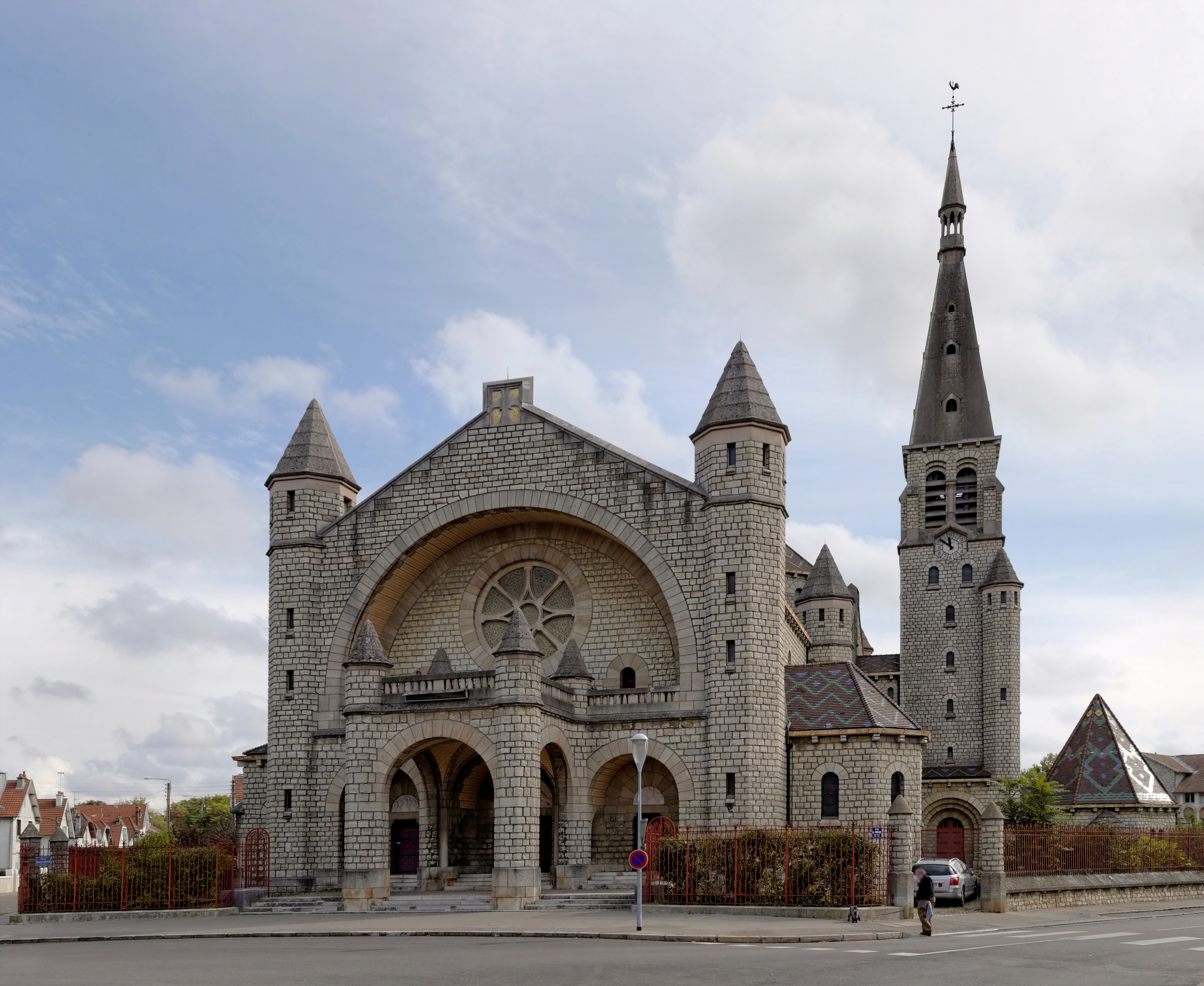
Sacré-Cœur

- Saint-Maurice de Bécon-les-Bruyères Church, Courbevoie (1907),

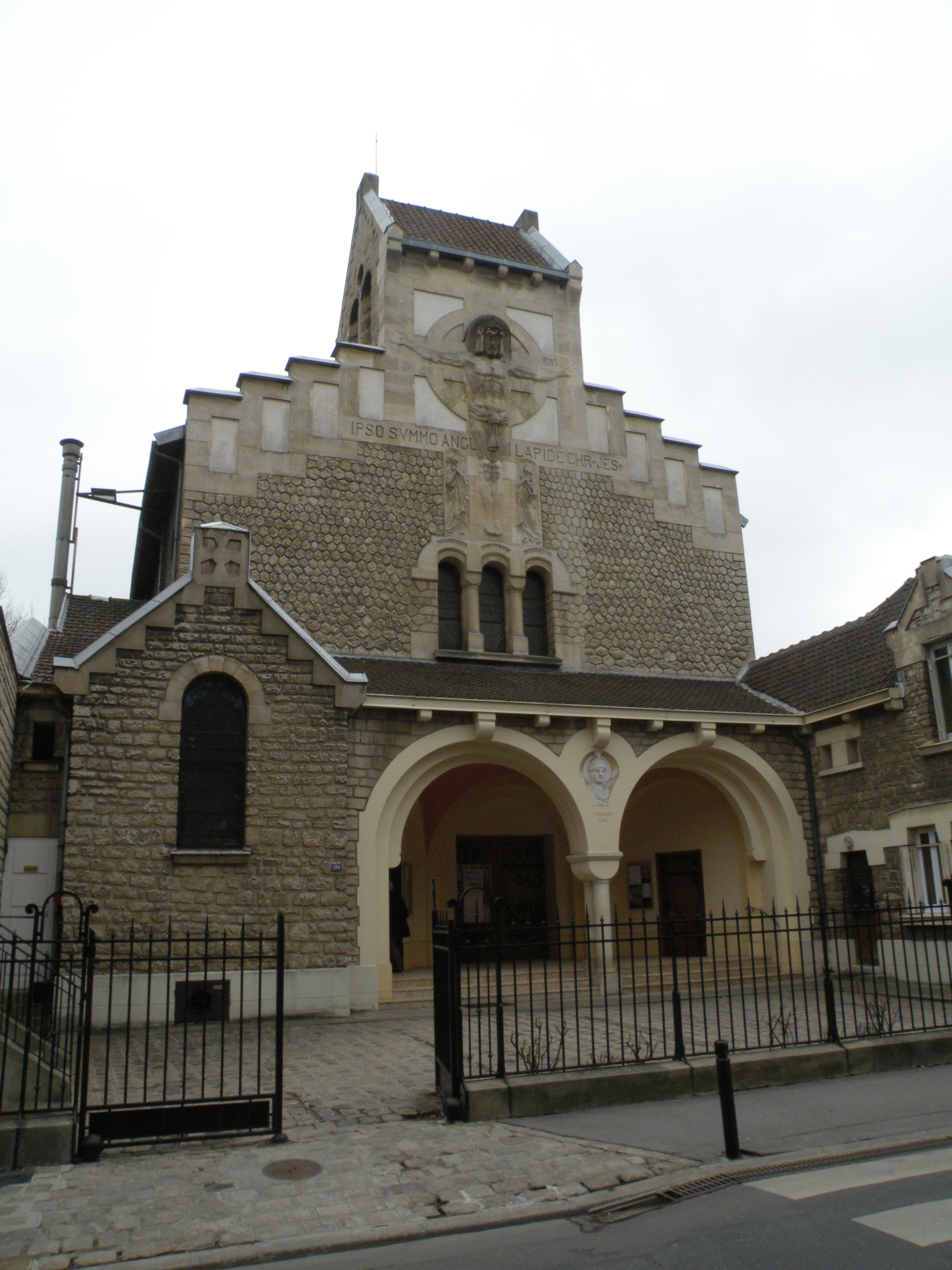
Saint-Maurice

- Saint-Rémi de Limé Church, Aisne (1929) (made a monument historique).

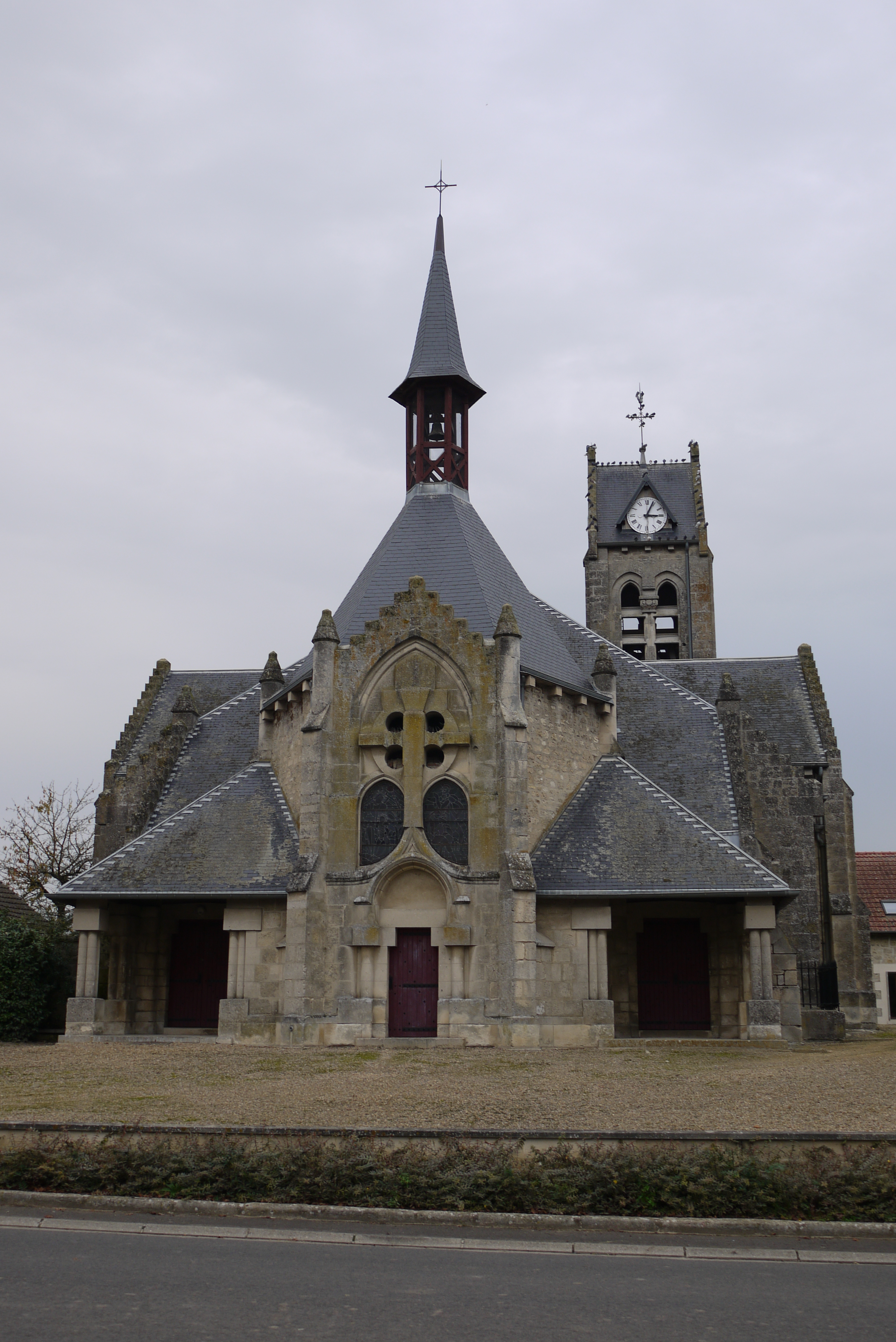
Saint-Rémi

- Sainte-Germaine Parish Church, Cachan (1932),

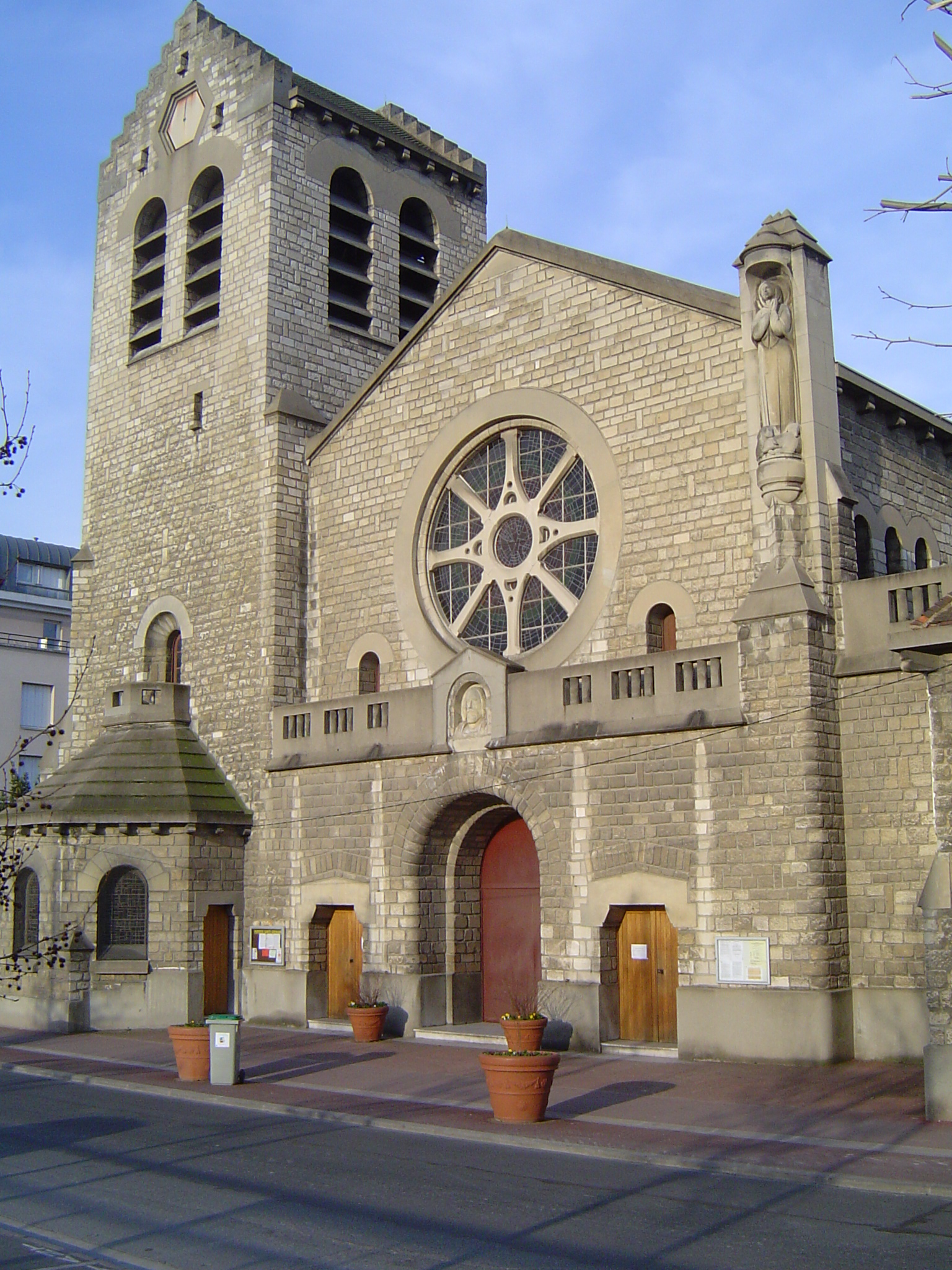
Sainte-Germaine

- Chapel of the Grand Saint-Mars Château, Chalo-Saint-Mars (1898), with Eugène Méhu (made a monument historique).

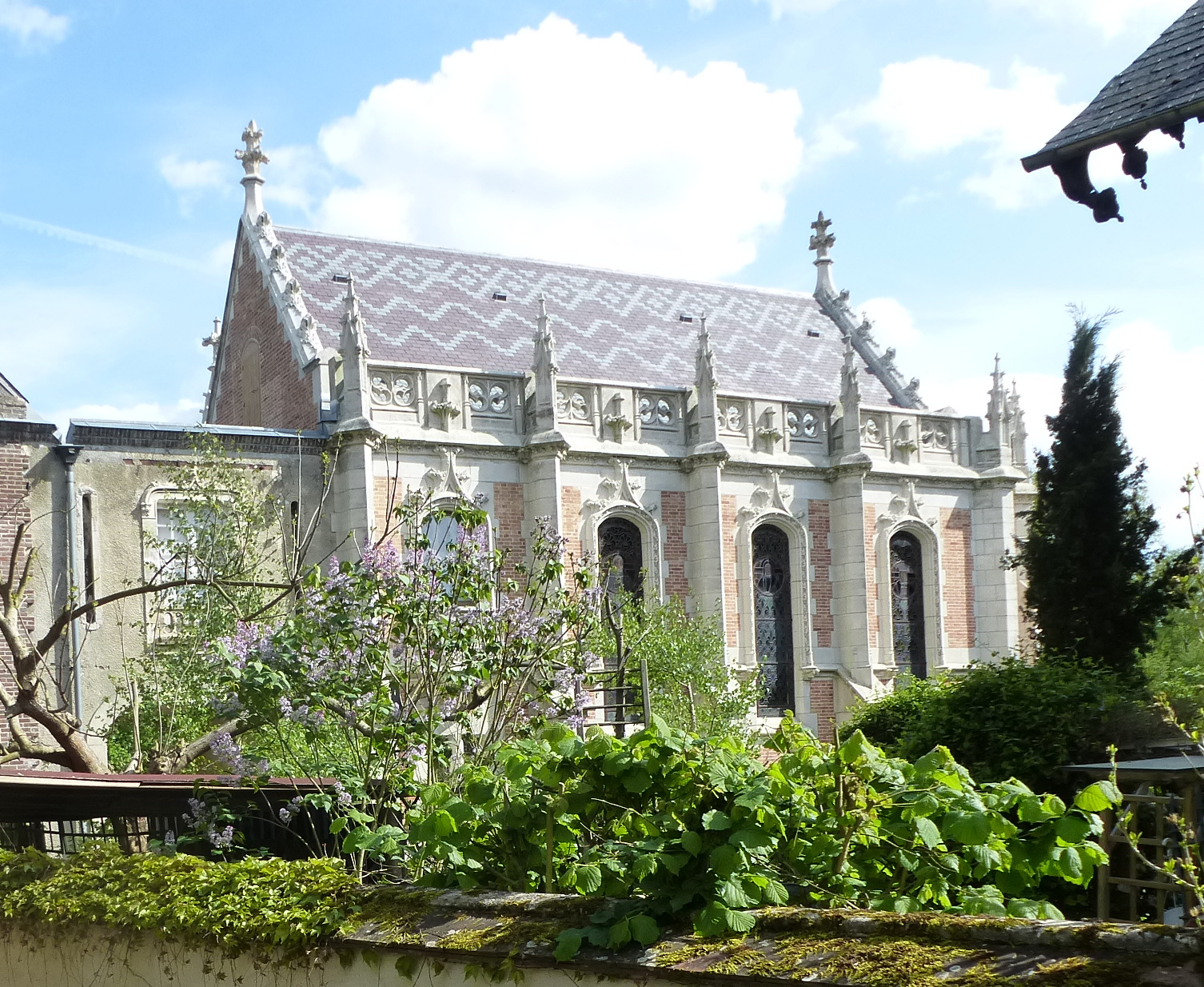
Saint-Mars

- War Memorial, La Garenne-Colombes (1913),
- The Lamartine School Complex, Gentilly (1922), with Georges Morice,
- The Notre-Dame-des-Otages Church, Paris,

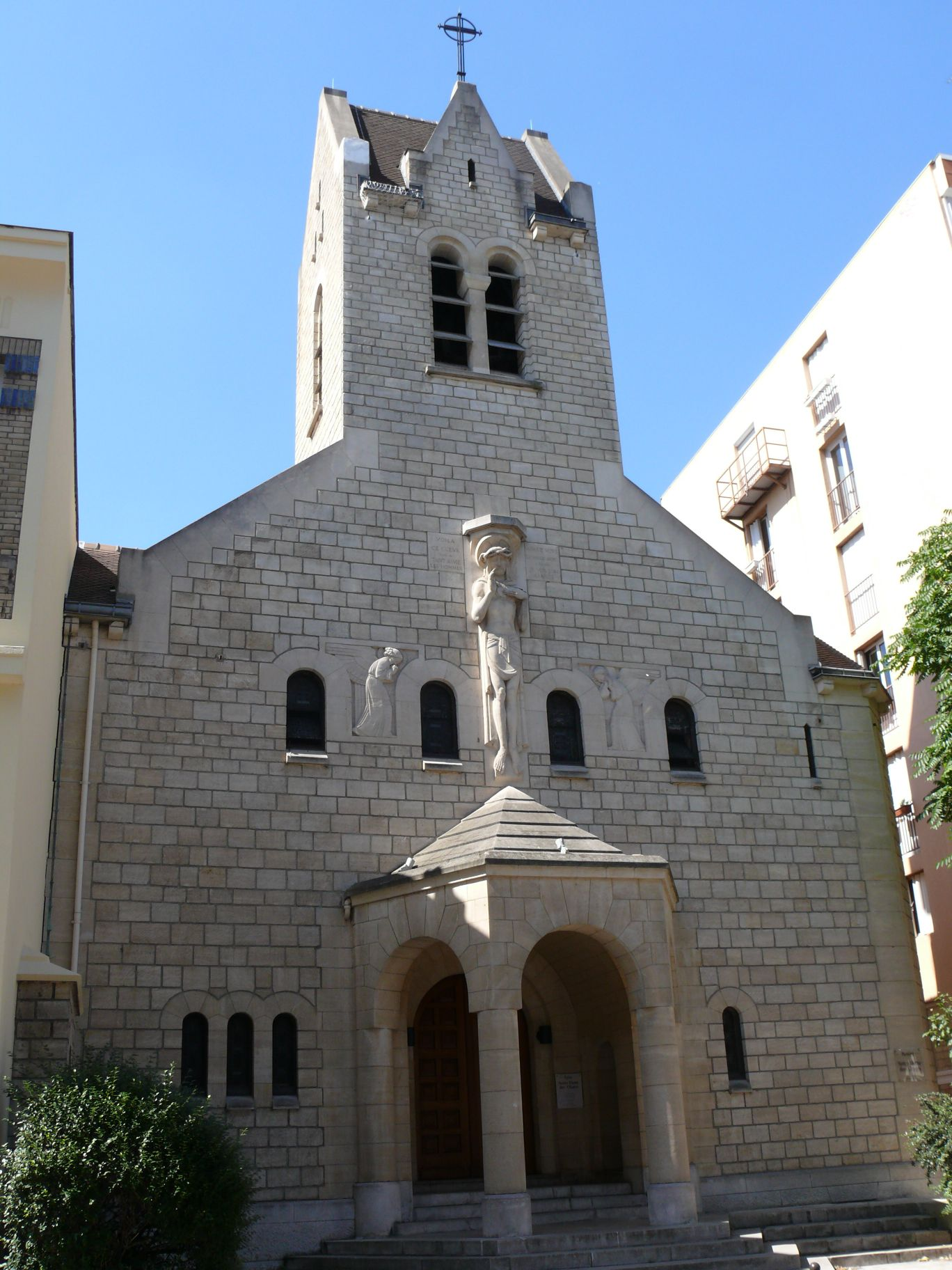
Notre-Dame

- The Sainte-Jeanne-de-Chantal Church, Paris.

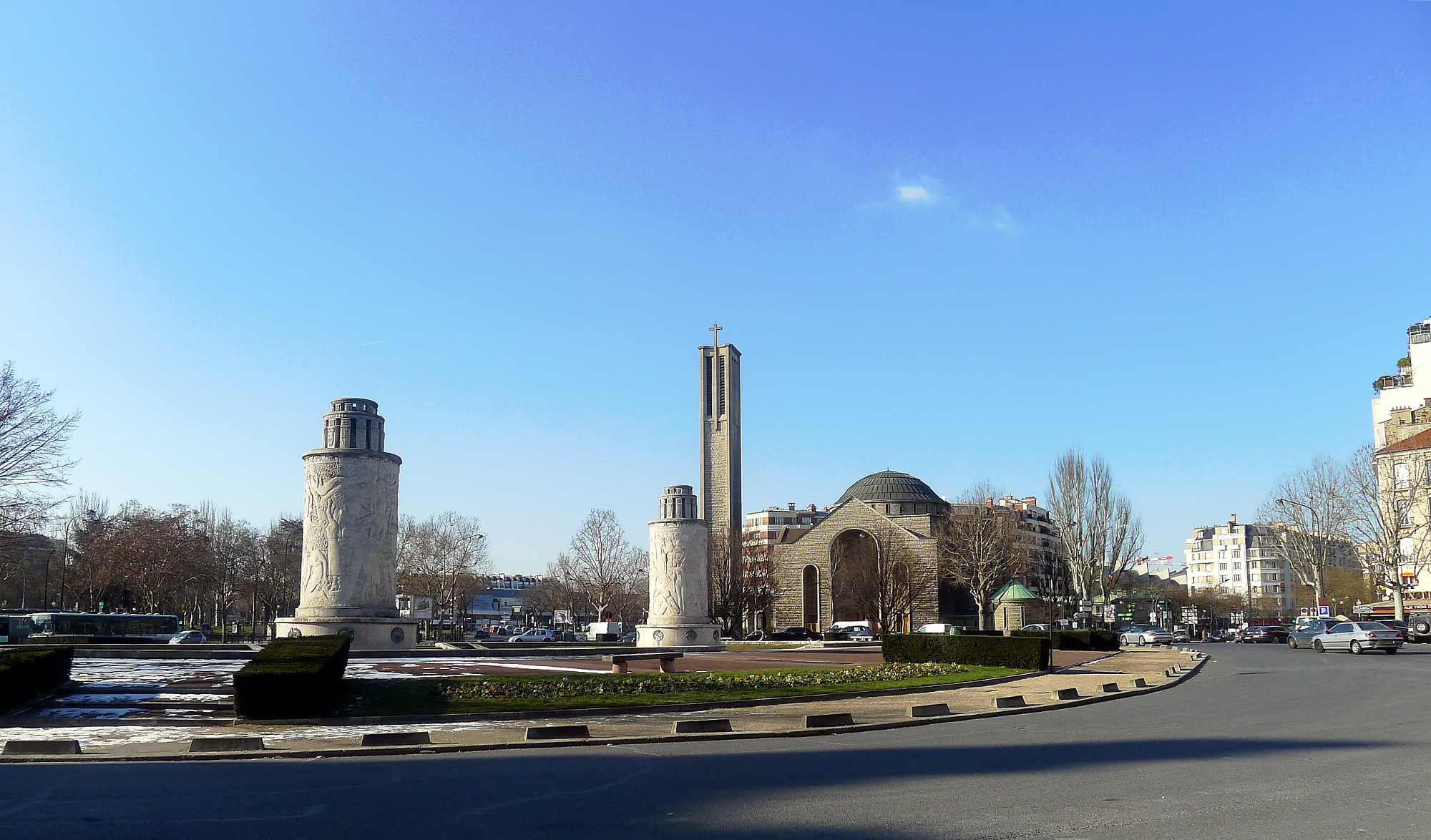
Sainte-Jeanne at center right
