= Alcide Chaussé =

Canadian architect

Joseph-Alcide Chaussé
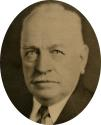
- Born: 7 January 1868; Saint-Sulpice, Quebec, Canada
- Died: 7 October 1944 (aged 76); Montréal, Quebec, Canada
- Occupation(s): Architect and author
- Known for: Empress Theatre (Montreal)
- Children: 5 children

Joseph-Alcide Chaussé (7 January 1868 – 7 October 1944) was a Canadian architect, best known for the Egyptian-style Empress Theatre in Montréal.

== Early years ==
Joseph-Alcide Chaussé was born in Saint-Sulpice, Quebec on 7 January 1868. His parents were Edouard Chaussé and Rose-de-Lima Rivest. His father was a timber merchant. He attended St. Mary's Academy (Académie Sainte-Marie), Montreal, then studied architecture in Montreal in the office of Alphonse Raza. He also studied under architects in Chicago and Milwaukee. He became an architect in 1888. He married Rose-de-Lima Renaud on 8 September 1894, and they had five sons, of whom two survived. In 1890 he was one of the founders of the Association of Architects of the Province of Quebec. He was responsible for the plans for the presbytery of the Assomption-de-la-Sainte-Vierge (1897) and the new facade of the church of Sainte-Jeanne-de-Chantal (1901) in what is now Notre-Dame-de-l'Île-Perrot.

== City official ==
On 21 May 1900 Chaussé was appointed a building inspector for the city of Montreal. He wrote papers for the cities of Montreal and Quebec about fire prevention and construction regulations. Chaussé was the main promoter of the Royal Architectural Institute of Canada, founded in 1907. He was honorary secretary of the institute until 1942. In 1911 Chaussé and the architect Joseph Venne overhauled the Montreal building regulations. In 1914 Chaussé was appointed municipal architect.

== Later career ==
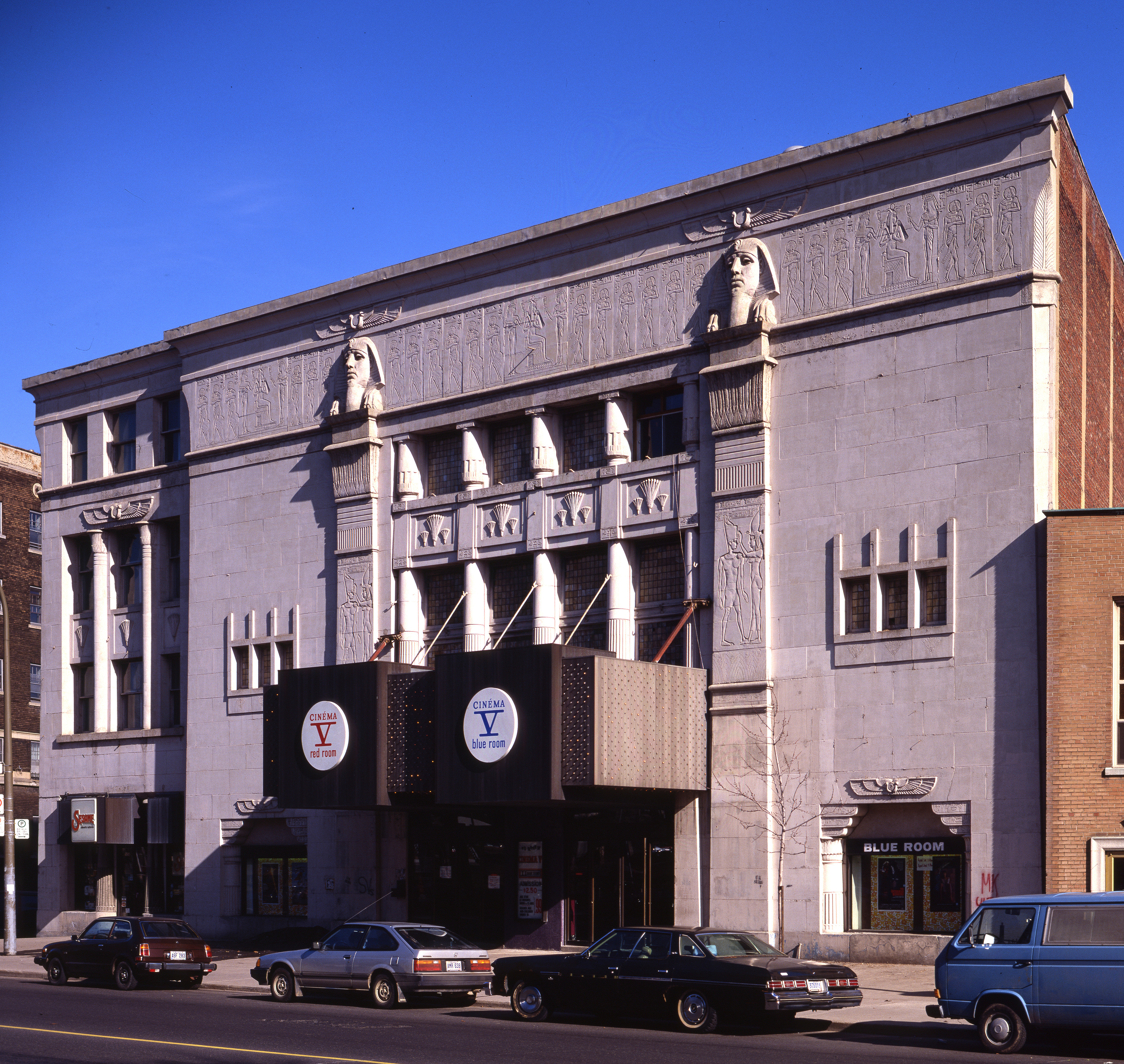
Empress Theatre (Montreal) (1927)

On 1 August 1918 Chaussé returned to private practice, specializing as an expert in court appearances and in municipal assessments. He designed the church of Sainte-Gertrude, built in 1925 in the north of the Island of Montreal. His best known work is the Empress Theater (1927) in Montreal in an Egyptian style inspired by the discovery of the tomb of Tutankhamun in 1922. Chaussé was involved in various national and international architects' associations, and participated in conferences in locations such as London, Budapest and Rio de Janeiro. Joseph-Alcide Chaussé died in Montreal on 7 October 1944.

== Publications ==
- Building Inspectors Handbook, 1902
- Code of Building Laws, Montreal, 1906
- Supplement to Code of Building By-Laws, Montreal, 1913

== Sources ==
- "Alcide Chaussé". Prominent People of the Province of Quebec. Montreal: Biographical Society of Canada, Limited. 1924.
- "Chaussé, Alcide" (in French). Gouvernement du Québec. 2013.
- "Fonds Alcide et Marcel Chaussé" (in French). Archives Lanaudière.
- Lemire, Robert (2008-05-19). "Joseph-Alcide Chaussé". The Canadian Encyclopedia.
