= Robert Juvin =

French sculptor

- Born: 1921; Redon, Ille-et-Vilaine
- Died: 22 December 2005; Menton, France
- Occupation: Sculptor

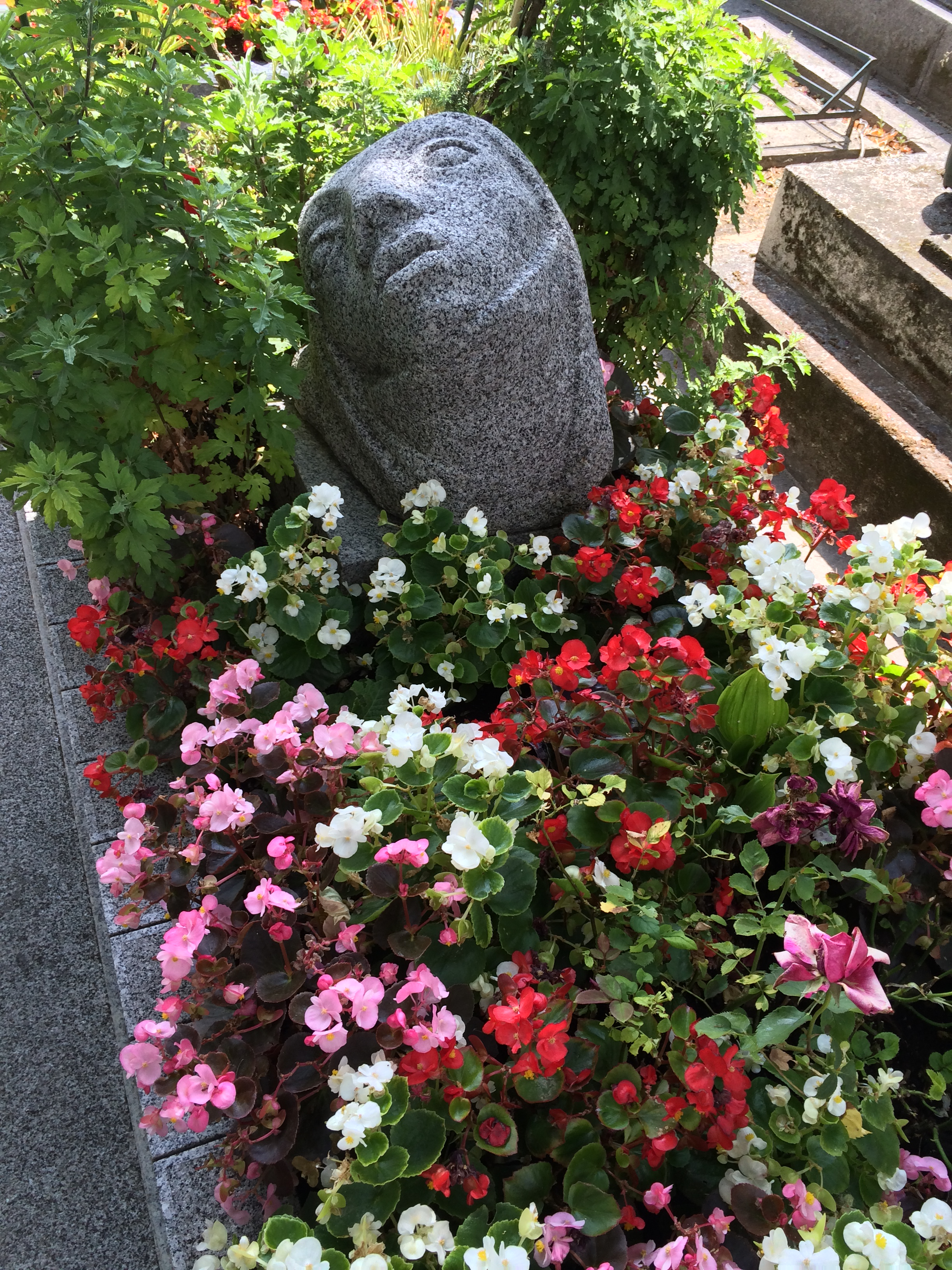
Grave of Robert Juvin, Montparnasse cemetery (div. 11), Paris XIVe

Robert Juvin (1921–2005) was a French sculptor who worked in stone and concrete, and is known for his mounted wall reliefs.

== Life and work ==
Robert Juvin was born in 1921 in Redon, Ille-et-Vilaine. He attended the École supérieure de dessin in Paris, and in 1941 went to the École des Beaux-arts in Paris. He also studied at the École régionale des Beaux-arts in Nantes. During World War II (1939–45) he fought in the French Resistance. Later he was awarded the Croix de Guerre. He was attached to the military government in Germany for administration of artistic recovery. Juvin was professor of sculpture at the French School in Koblenz, Germany.

Juvin founded the group Mur Vivant (Living Wall) which set itself the goal of re-integrating the visual arts with architecture. He prepared reliefs in asbestos-cement. Juvin was commissioned to create one of the sixteen haut-relief sculptures for the Mémorial de la France combattante at Fort Mont-Valérien, opened in June 1960. His sculpture, entitled Narvik, commemorates the departure of the French expeditionary force from Narvik, Norway on 3–8 June 1940. It depicts a longship pierced with arrows, but still afloat. His Allégorie de la Loire, made around 1960, is mounted in the wall of the Quai Mayaud of Saumur.

In 1962 Juvin created a bas-relief Bienheureuse Vierge de la Merced for the facade of the Église Sainte-Jeanne-de-Chantal in Paris (16e). Early in 1964 Juvin's work was displayed in the Biennale de la Sculpture at the Rodin museum in Paris. Juvin was commissioned to create the facades of the Musée de La Poste. Juvin's sculpture Couple (1987) stands in the gardens of the Palais Carnoles, Menton's Museum of Fine Art. A retrospective exhibition of his work was held at the Palais Carnoles from 22 February to 19 May 2003. Robert Juvin died in Menton in décember 2005.

== Awards ==
Awards given to Juvin included:

- Prix de la Fondation Florence Blumenthal, 1954
- Officier des Arts et Lettres, 1961
- Prix du Jeune Travailleur Intellectuel – collaboration architecte-sculpteur, 1962
- Grande médaille d’argent de la Ville de Paris, 1963

== Sources ==
- AC. Editions Girsberger. 1967.
- "JUVIN Robert" (PDF). Région Basse-Normandie. Archived from the original (PDF) on 2014-11-29.
- "La Loire à Saumur". petit patrimoine.
- "Les seize hauts reliefs". Mont-Valérien.
- "Paris, église Sainte-Jeanne-de-Chantal". patrimoine-histoire.fr.
- Revue Internationale D'amiante-ciment: Internationale Asbestzement-Revue. International Asbestos-cement Review. 1969.
- "Robert Juvin". Artaujourdhui.
- Texier, Simon (2007). Paris, grammaire de l'architecture, XXe-XXIe siècles. Parigramme. ISBN 9782840964469.
- "The Couple". Menton Daily Photo. 2010-08-15.
