= Intégrale Prépa =

French college prep school

Intégrale : Institut d'enseignement supérieur privé
- Paris and Clamart; France

Information
- Type: Private Classes Préparatoires aux Grandes Écoles
- Established: 1985
- Language: French
- Website: www.integrale-prepa.com

Intégrale : Institut d'enseignement supérieur privé (French for 'Intégrale : Private Institute of Higher Education'), or simply Intégrale Prépa, is a French private establishment exclusively composed of classes préparatoires. It was founded in 1985 and has a high rate of admission to top "Grandes Écoles" such as HEC Paris, ESSEC Business School and ESCP Europe.

== Locations ==
Intégrale has two different campuses:

- Rue du Rocher, 8th arrondissement of Paris
- Rue de l'église, Clamart (Parisian suburb)

The Avenue Paul Doumer (16th arrondissement of Paris) location has now closed.
