= Sainte-Jeanne-de-Chantal, Paris =

Church of Sainte-Jeanne-de-Chantal
- Église Sainte-Jeanne-de-Chantal
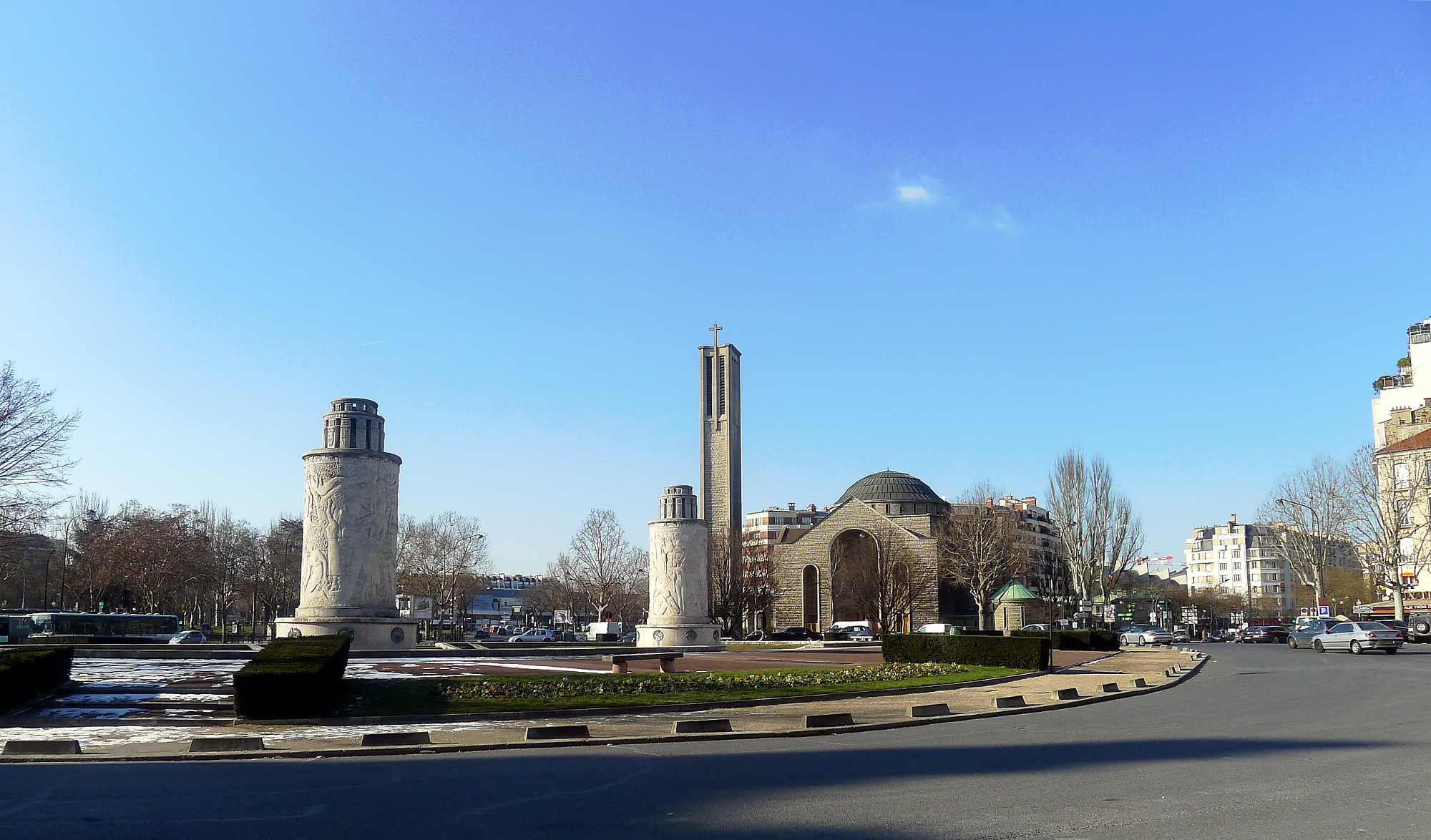
- Place de la Porte de Saint-Cloud, Paris XVI; Church is center-right

- Location within Paris
- 48.838722°N 2.256139°E
- Location: Place de la Porte de Saint Cloud, Paris 75016
- Country: France
- Denomination: Catholic
- Website: www.saintejeannedechantal.com

Specifications
- Materials: Concrete

Administration
- Diocese: Paris
- Parish: Sainte-Jeanne-de-Chantal

Sainte-Jeanne-de-Chantal (French pronunciation: [sɛ̃t.ʒan.də.ʃɑ̃.tal]) is a Catholic church in Paris built of concrete in Byzantine style with a large dome. It was constructed between 1932 and 1956.

== History ==
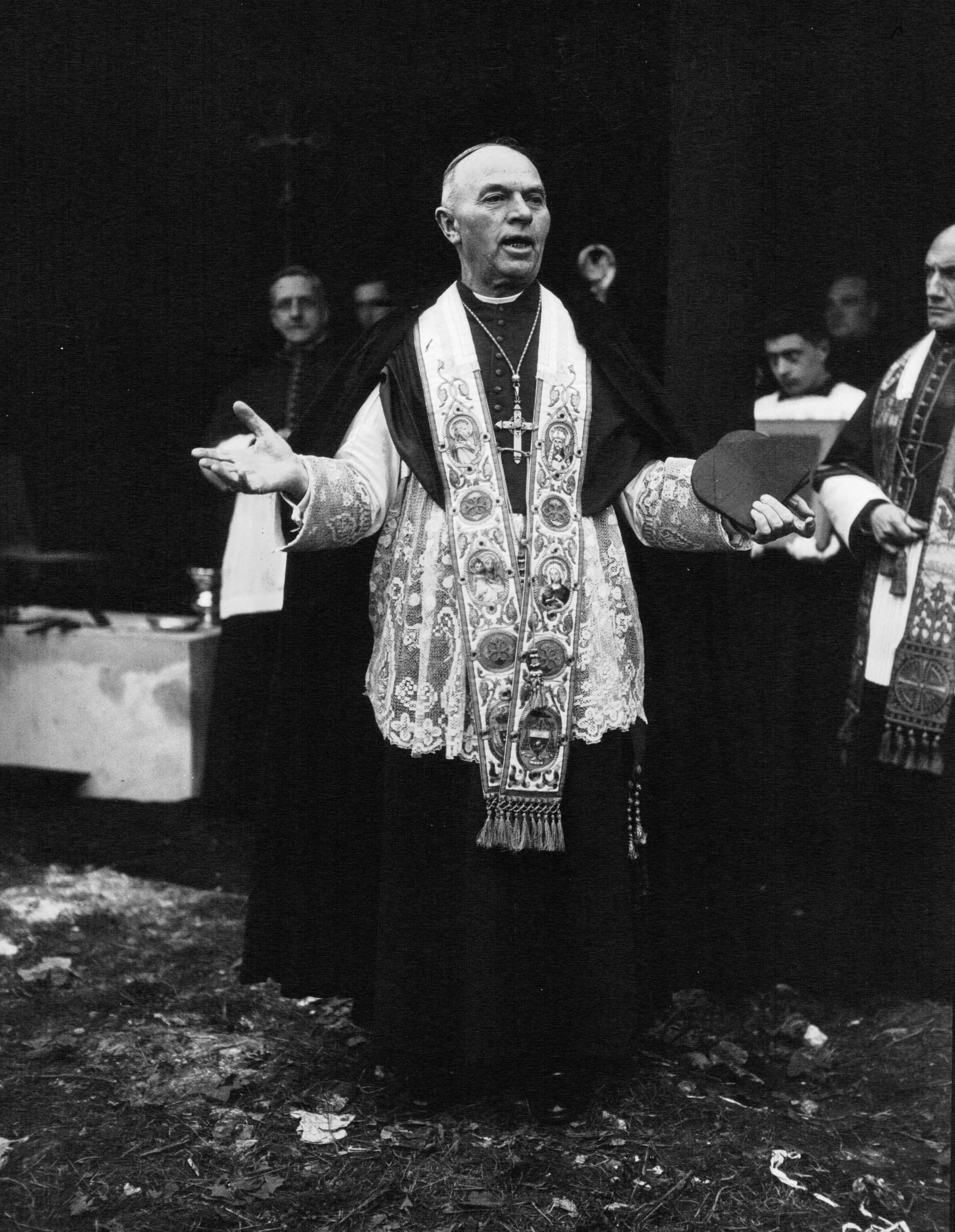
Cardinal Jean Verdier at the foundation ceremony of the future Sainte-Jeanne-de-Chantal Church in Paris in 1933

The Église Sainte-Jeanne-de-Chantal is located on the grounds of some old fortifications. The population of the Paris neighborhood of the Porte de Saint-Cloud was growing fast in the 1920s, and a new church was needed. A Parisian woman from the area made a significant donation to help with the construction before she entered the convent of the Order of the Visitation, founded by François de Sales and Jeanne de Chantal. The architect Julien Barbier (1869–1939) was made responsible for the construction. The first stone was laid in 1932.

The Église Sainte-Jeanne-de-Chantal was near to the Renault factories, and was bombed by the allies during World War II (1939–45). After the liberation of Paris construction resumed as part of the Chantiers du Cardinal program. Some changes were made to the design. The nave was enlarged and the dome flattened. Construction was not complete until 1956. The building was finished in 1962.

Cardinal Jean-Marie Lustiger, Archbishop of Paris, was curé of the parish of Sainte-Jeanne-de-Chantal from 1969 to 1979, when he was named Bishop of Orleans.

== Structure ==
The Église Sainte-Jeanne-de-Chantal has a Byzantine style, which had become popular in Western Europe after the rediscovery of ancient Hagia Sophia in Constantinople. It features a large dome. The structure is concrete, and the walls are covered in "reconstituted stones". In 1962 Robert Juvin created a bas-relief Bienheureuse Vierge de la Merced for the facade of the church. The bell tower is separate from the church and dominates the square.

The interior is spacious and has a sober elegance. The Chapel of the Blessed Sacrament, in the apse, can be hidden from the nave by a large curtain. Only this chapel has figurative stained glass. The eight windows by Jacques Le Chevallier (1954) illustrate the Litany of the Virgin. The church has stations of the cross by Hervé Quenolle (2001) and sculptures by Jean Touret (1975) and Sébastien Touret (2004). The Tourets, father and son, undertook the liturgical furniture and much of the decoration.

== See also ==
- Place de la Porte-de-Saint-Cloud

== Sources ==
- "Histoire de l'église Sainte Jeanne de Chantal" (in French). Sainte Jeanne de Chantal. Archived from the original on 2023-01-27.
- "Jean-Marie LUSTIGER" (in French). Académie française.
- "Paris, église Sainte-Jeanne-de-Chantal". patrimoine-histoire.fr (in French).
- "Sainte-Jeanne de Chantal" (in French). Diocèse de Paris.
