= Sainte-Jeanne-de-Chantal (Île Perrot) =

Église Sainte-Jeanne-de-Chantal
- Location within Quebec
- 45.3494°N 73.9017°W
- Country: Canada
- Denomination: Catholic
- Website: www.paroissesjc.org

Specifications
- Materials: Concrete

Administration
- Diocese: Roman Catholic Diocese of Valleyfield
- Parish: Sainte-Jeanne-de-Chantal

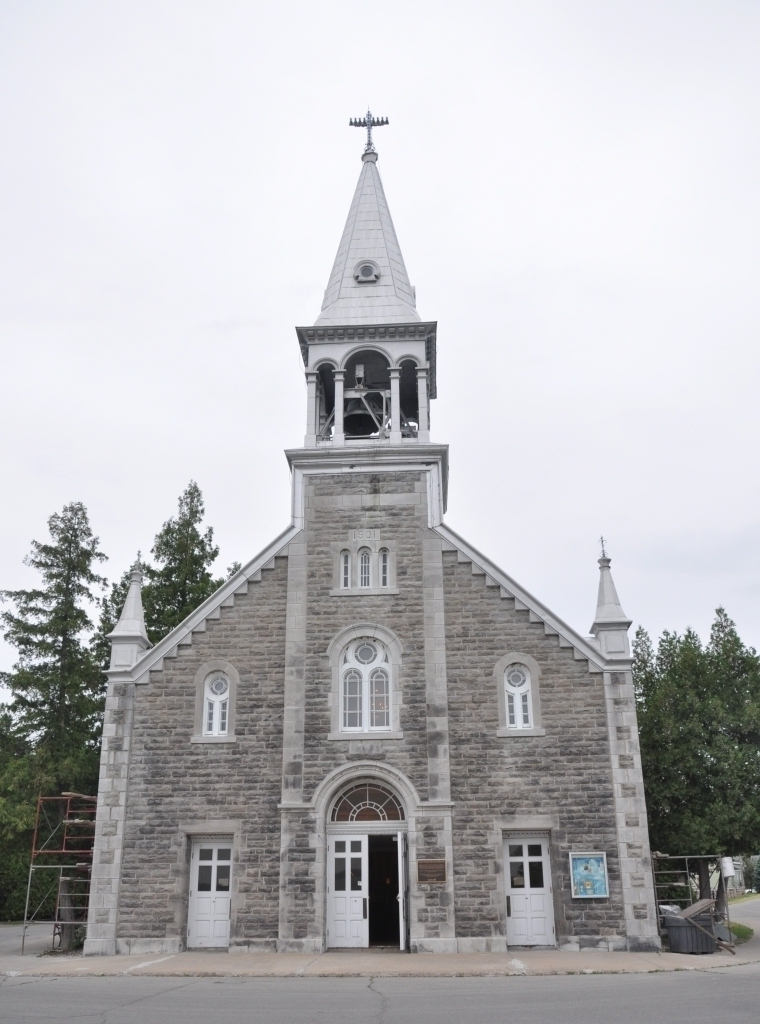
Ste-Jeanne-Chantal-Ile-Perrot.jpg

Sainte-Jeanne-de-Chantal is a Catholic church on the Île Perrot to the west of the island of Montreal in the Canadian province of Quebec. Built in 1773–74, it is one of the oldest surviving rural churches in North America.

== Location ==
The church is located on a promontory of the Île Perrot, on a bluff overlooking the Saint Lawrence River, known as the Cataraqui River by the original inhabitants.

It lies in the municipality of Notre-Dame-de-l'Île-Perrot, and faces the town of Beauharnois to the south.

The bell tower serves as a navigation aid. It is one of the ten oldest rural religious foundations in North America. The church is dedicated to Saint Jane Frances de Chantal to honor the devotion of the Seigneuresse Jeanne-Françoise Cullerier for that saint.

== History ==
The Île Perrot was granted to François-Marie Perrot by Jean Talon in 1672. From then until 1721 it was part of the Pointe-Claire parish, but residents often traveled to the nearer parish of Sainte-Anne du Bout (now Sainte-Anne-de-Bellevue) for religious services. Either way, they had to go by canoe.

A small chapel was built on the island in 1743. This soon proved too small for the growing population, and in 1753 the seigneur Jean-Baptiste Leduc granted the site on which the present church was built. Construction did not start until 1773, and was completed in August 1774.

Work continued until 1783. The original church was rectangular, with roughly the same dimensions as the present nave, ending in a semi-circular apse.

The exterior walls were built of red ocher sandstone masonry. In 1838 they were covered in cement, which was repaired several times afterwards.

At first the parish was served by a visiting priest, then in 1789 a resident priest came to live permanently on the island.

The "syndics", or representatives of the parishioners, gradually acquired furniture, paintings and sacred vessels. The building was enlarged in 1812. The tower was installed in 1842, with the first bell, and in 1848 the church was enlarged on the side of the sacristy.

The sacristy was burned down in 1852 and rebuilt in 1853. The bell tower was struck by lightning in 1863, and was not repaired for two years. In 1864 the cedar shingles that covered the church and sacristy roof were replaced with sheet metal.

In 1896 the tower collapsed in a gale and had to be rebuilt.

In its fall the tower had damaged the front of the church. In 1901 the nave was extended by 2.5 metres (8 ft 2 in) and a new facade was built, with a new bell tower 21 metres (69 ft) high. The architect Alcide Chaussé (1868–1944) designed the eclectic new facade.

New bells were installed in 1925. The church was declared a historic monument in 1961 by the Ministry of Cultural Affairs. In 2008 it was designated one of the "Seven Wonders of Vaudreuil-Soulanges".

== Description ==
The original church building was 60 by 30 feet (18.3 by 9.1 m), and was 18 feet (5.5 m) high to the roof ridge. It had eight glass windows with shutters and a door.

The ceiling was vaulted, made of bleached planks, and covered with cedar shingles. In 1812 the nave was extended about 10 metres (33 ft) and the semi-circular apse was replaced by a flat walled choir.

A sacristy was built as an extension of the choir at this time. With the addition of two side chapels the building took the shape of a Roman cross.

The front of the church originally had just one door, but the 1901 restoration added two smaller doors and four windows.

The interior decoration is in the Louis XV and Louis XVI styles, typical of traditional Quebec architecture.

The high altar tableau, representing the patron saint Jeanne de Chantal, was acquired in 1790. It has been attributed to the painter Louis Dulongpré (1759–1843). Joseph Turcaut, who had studied under the sculptor Joseph Pépin (1770–1842) in the Écores workshop, made the paneling and false ceiling between 1812 and 1819, and probably also made the altars. In 1828 Louis-Xavier Leprohon (1795–1876), also from the Écores workshop, made the altarpieces, the entablature of the nave and the ornamentation of the false ceiling. The work of Turcaut and Le Prohon has been preserved intact.

The medallions of Ecce Homo and La Vierge de douleur by unknown artists were installed in 1828 at the same time as the altarpiece. "The Miracle St. Anthony" and the "Baptism of Christ" in the transept are also by unknown artists.

The transept also has a painting of "Christ in pain", painted in 1881 by Joseph Dynes (1825–97) of Quebec. The altarpiece of the west arm of the transept has a statue of Our Lady of the Guard donated in 1849 by the Sulpicians of Montreal. It is one of the first statues made by the Grey Nuns of Montreal in Papier-mâché, a technique they often used.

The rectory was built in 1780 by Basile Proulx. It is a large stone house in typical style for the period. The exterior is unchanged apart from an addition in 1992. The interior was restored in the 1850s after a fire had caused severe damage.

The priest lived in part of the building, which also contained a large meeting room, the salle des habitants. The room was used as a school for a short time. Around 1860 it became the first library on the island. The old cemetery behind the church dates to 1793, and was surrounded by a high stone wall. It was enlarged and the wall rebuilt in 1942. A new terraced cemetery accessed by a large central stairway was built between 1951 and 1959, sloping down toward the Saint Lawrence.

The terraced cemetery is the only one of this type in Quebec.

The Chapel of Remembrance was built in 1953, a reconstruction of the original small chapel. The commemorative chapel used stones from the original chapel at Pointe-du-Moulin.

== Sources ==
- Aubuchon, Isabelle (2014). "Fondation du patrimoine Sainte-Jeanne-de-Chantal" (in French).
- Aubuchon, Isabelle (2014b). "L'île Perrot et sa première église" (in French). Archived from the original on 2014-10-31.
- Aubuchon, Isabelle (2014c). "L'église" (in French). Archived from the original on 2014-10-31.
- "Église de Sainte-Jeanne-de-Chantal" (in French). Conseil du patrimoine religieux du Québec. 2003.
- "Historiques - Église Ste-Jeanne-de-Chantal" (in French). Paroisse Sainte-Jeanne-de-Chantal.
- Hunter Publishing (2006-01-01). Quebec. Ulysses Travel Guides. ISBN 978-2-89464-711-0.
