= Léon François Chervet =

French sculptor

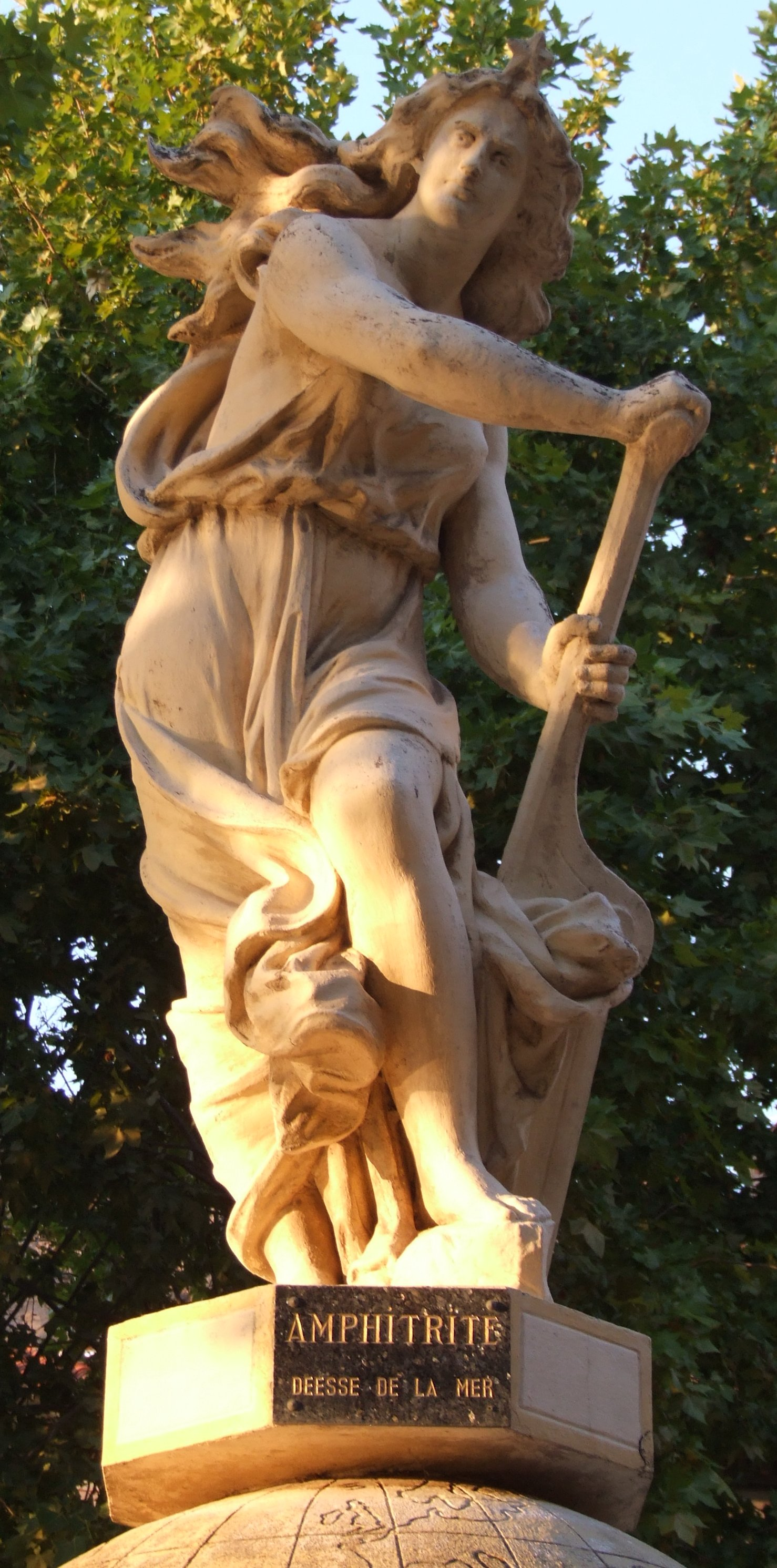
Allegorical figure by Léon François Chervet, now at Agde, as "Amphitrite"

Léon François Chervet was a French sculptor, a representative of the high quality of design and execution engendered by the training of the official French École des Beaux-Arts, even among artists of the second rank in reputation.

His allegorical sculpture, now called "Amphitrite" (illustration) is his only public sculpture. She formerly stood on the façade of the Palais du Trocadéro, Paris, built for the Exposition Universelle (1878) and demolished to make way for the Exposition of 1937. She was preserved and offered to the city of Agde, where, as "Amphitrite", she now symbolizes Agde's maritime vocation in the place de la Marine.

Chervet exhibited at the annual Paris Salon at the Palais des Champs-Elysées, Paris, often hors concours, as sculptures acquired by the State
