= Trocadéro Palace =

Building in Paris built for the 1878 Paris Exposition

- Palais du Trocadéro
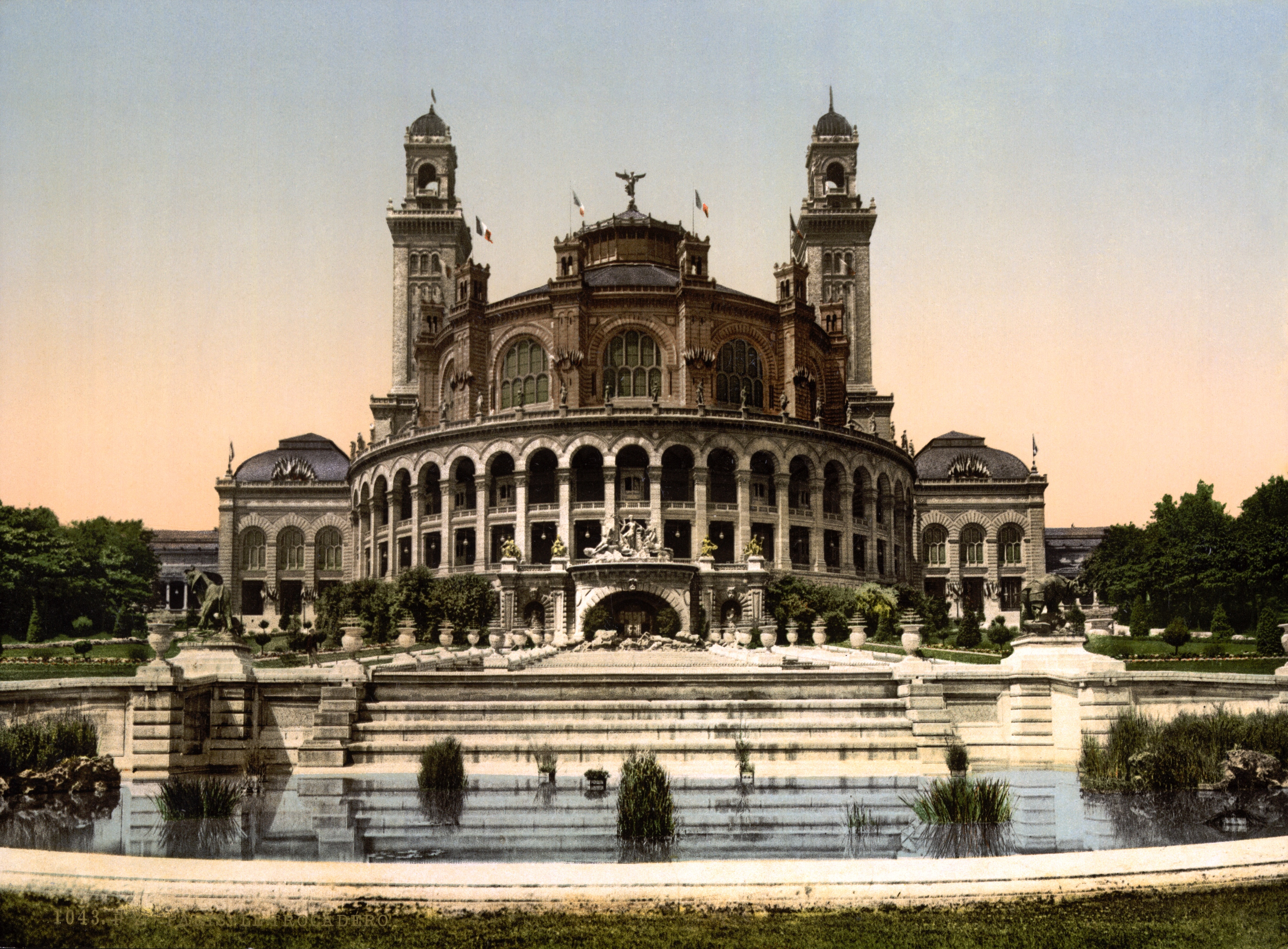
- The Trocadéro Palace and its fountain during the 1900 Exposition Universelle, seen from the gardens.
- Interactive map of Trocadéro Palace
- Address: Paris; France
- Coordinates: 48°51′44″N 2°17′18″E
- Elevation: 80 m (260 ft)
- Type: Palace
- Events: Eclectic and Moorish architecture
- Current use: Destroyed

Construction
- Built: 1876–1878
- Opened: 1878
- Demolished: 1935
- Architects: Gabriel Davioud and Jules Bourdais

Tenant
- Musée national des Monuments Français (1882–1937)

The Trocadéro Palace was an eclectic building of Moorish and neo-Byzantine inspiration dating from the second half of the 19th century. Located in the 16th arrondissement of Paris, on the Convent of the Visitandines de Chaillot between the Place du Trocadéro and the gardens of the same name, it comprised a 4,600-seat auditorium extended on either side by two curved wings, each housing a museum (the Musée des Monuments Français and the Musée d'Ethnographie), as well as conference rooms.

Built for the 1878 Exposition Universelle, it was not intended to outlast the event; although the building was eventually preserved for some sixty years, it was widely criticized for its architectural style, its progressive dilapidation, and the poor acoustics of its main hall, which was soon deserted by orchestras. It was dismantled in 1935 in preparation for the 1937 Exposition Universelle, to make way for a new building, the Palais de Chaillot.

== History ==
=== Past ===
==== Initial projects ====
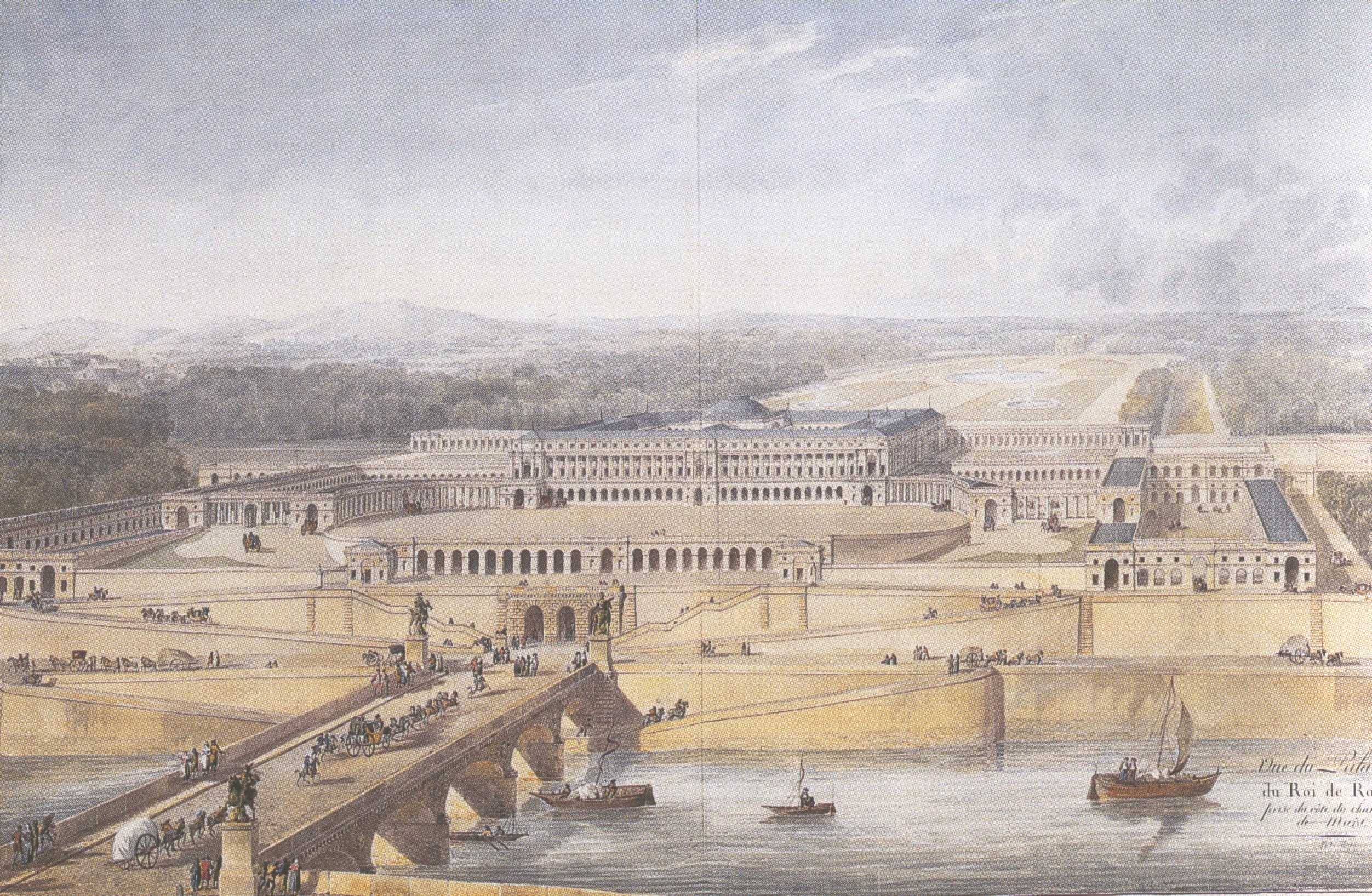
Artist's conception of what the construction of the Palace of the King of Rome would have looked like.

The location of the Trocadéro Palace has witnessed a succession of buildings and architectural projects. Originally, the site was part of the former estate of Maréchal de Bassompierre, Henry IV's comrade-in-arms. In 1651, Henrietta Maria of France founded a convent of the Visitation order, which was destroyed during the French Revolution.

In February 1811, Emperor Napoleon I decided to build on the site of the Palace of the King of Rome, a building intended to be the residence of his son (one month before the latter's birth). It was to be the center of an imperial administrative and military city. (Note: The "Palais du Roi de Rome" at Rambouillet is in fact a private mansion dating from the reign of Louis XVI, refurbished under the First Empire. The Chaillot project corresponds more closely to the palace built between 1784 and 1785 by the architect Jacques-Jean Thévenin for the Duc d'Angiviller, governor of the Rambouillet estate; its link with the King of Rome is also stronger, as it is linked to the very essence of the project, whereas the link between Rambouillet and Napoleon's son corresponds to a very short period in the construction history of Jacques-Jean Thévenin. The town of Rambouillet uses the name "Palais du Roi de Rome" for reasons of prestige and tourism.) The architects in charge of the project were Charles Percier and Pierre-François-Léonard Fontaine.

Another project, envisaged by Antoine-Marie Peyre in 1824, the "villa Trocadéro" is an urban planning project centered on a semi-circular square, organized around the commemoration of the recent victory at Trocadéro in Spain by the Duke of Angoulême in 1823, leaving the choice of architecture to the purchasers of the plots. In 1839, Camille Moret designed a tomb for Napoleon I, and in 1841, Hector Horeau proposed the addition of a colossal 30-metre statue of the Emperor.

In 1858, the sculptor Antoine Étex, having proposed a monument to Liberty in 1848, envisaged a "monumental lighthouse or fountain" at the center of a circular square housing the imperial palace and ministerial buildings. In 1868, Hector Horeau proposed a new project for a colossal statue of "intelligent France enlightening the world". But none of this came to fruition.

==== "Trocadéro" ====
The name "Trocadéro" comes from the Trocadéro fort, which defended the Spanish port of Cadiz. On 31 August 1823, it was taken by the French expeditionary corps commanded by the Duke of Angoulême, who had been sent by his uncle, King Louis XVIII of France, to restore King Ferdinand VII to his Spanish throne. The Trocadéro site thus refers to a French military victory. In 1826, during a re-enactment of this feat of arms in a military parade for the French king Charles X, the site's layout was used to depict the battle: the hill of Chaillot represented the "Trocadéro fort" and was to be "conquered" from the Champ-de-Mars, from where the French "troops" set off (a papier-mâché fort was built on the hill).

A temporary triumphal arch was erected and the foundation stone laid for a military barracks, which was never built. The obelisk that was also to be built in the middle of the hill never got beyond the planning stage. Bonapartists even proposed erecting the Emperor's tomb here, before the remains were moved to the Hôtel des Invalides.

However, the top of the hill remained uncultivated until it was leveled to create the Place du Roi de Rome (Place du Trocadéro) in 1869, and the land below until the Trocadéro gardens were laid out in 1876.

=== 1878 Exposition Universelle building ===
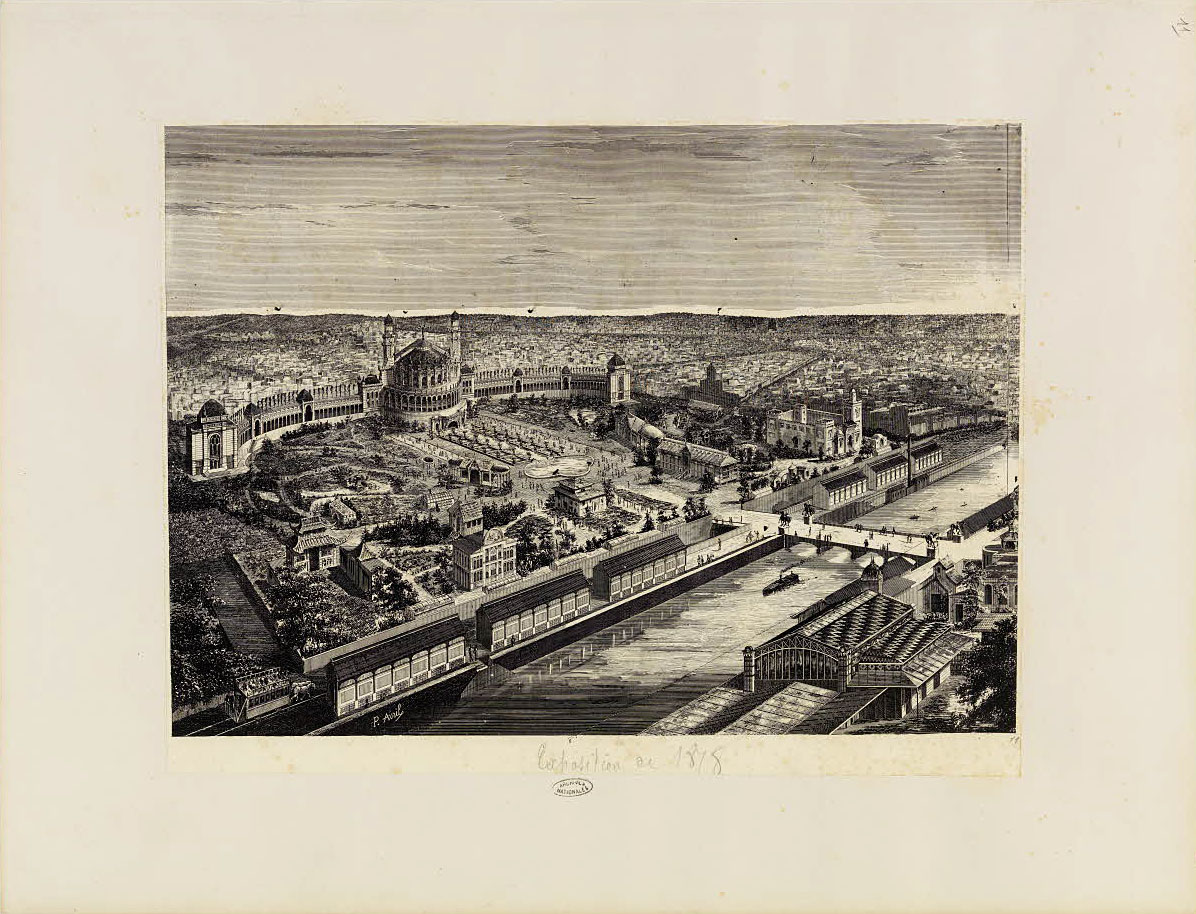
1878 Exposition Universelle. Panoramic view of the central part of the exhibition (Archives nationales - F/12/11919 - Pièce 11).

From the mid-1860s onwards, the Chaillot hill underwent "earthworks and levelling" to provide a panoramic view of the 1867 Exposition Universelle facilities on the Rive Gauche (Left Bank), and to create the Champ-de-Mars park. The square, then still called "Place du Roi de Rome", was linked to the Pont d'Iéna by a granite staircase.

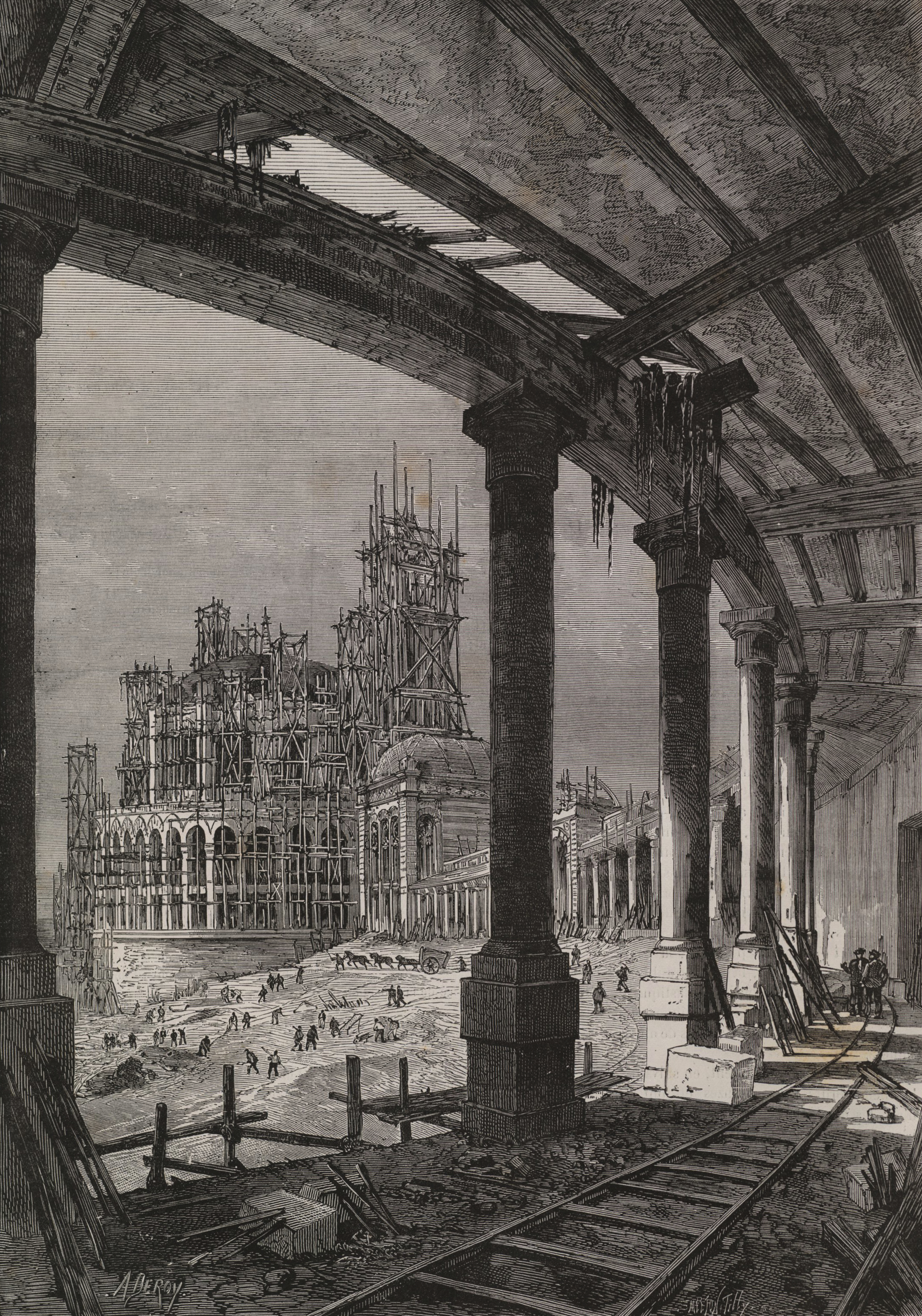
Construction of the palace in 1878.

As early as 1876, there was talk of developing the site for the 1878 Exposition Universelle. The program for the Concours pour l'Exposition Universelle of 1878 called up for the construction of a "formidable hall for public meetings and solemnities". The palace was designed by architects Gabriel Davioud and Jules Bourdais, inspired by the Giralda in Seville, the Palazzo Vecchio in Florence, and, above all, by Baron Haussmann's 1864 project for a 10,000-person hall, the Orphéon, which was to have been built on the Place du Château d'Eau. It was the result of a competition, whose requirements included a 10,000-seat festival hall and exhibition galleries; 94 teams entered the competition, but the Davioud-Bourdais project had in fact already been selected. The design features two semicircular wings linked by a circular central section flanked by two towers, in the Moorish or neo-Byzantine style; on the square side, the gable is "Flemish-style", although other commentators refer less to the orientalism of the project than to a whimsical style, now typical of all world's fairs since London's Crystal Palace in 1851.

Work on the Trocadéro Palace took place between November 1876 and June 1878; in 1877, the square was renamed "Place du Trocadéro", while in July of the same year, "the two-story portico of the central body was completed, while the walls delimiting the high windows were being added". Given the resources available at the time, workers still had to maneuver on "wooden scaffolding erected as a framework". In October, the roof began to be laid and the waterfall bed was dug out of the mine (the waterfall descends from the central body to the gardens in the form of a fountain).

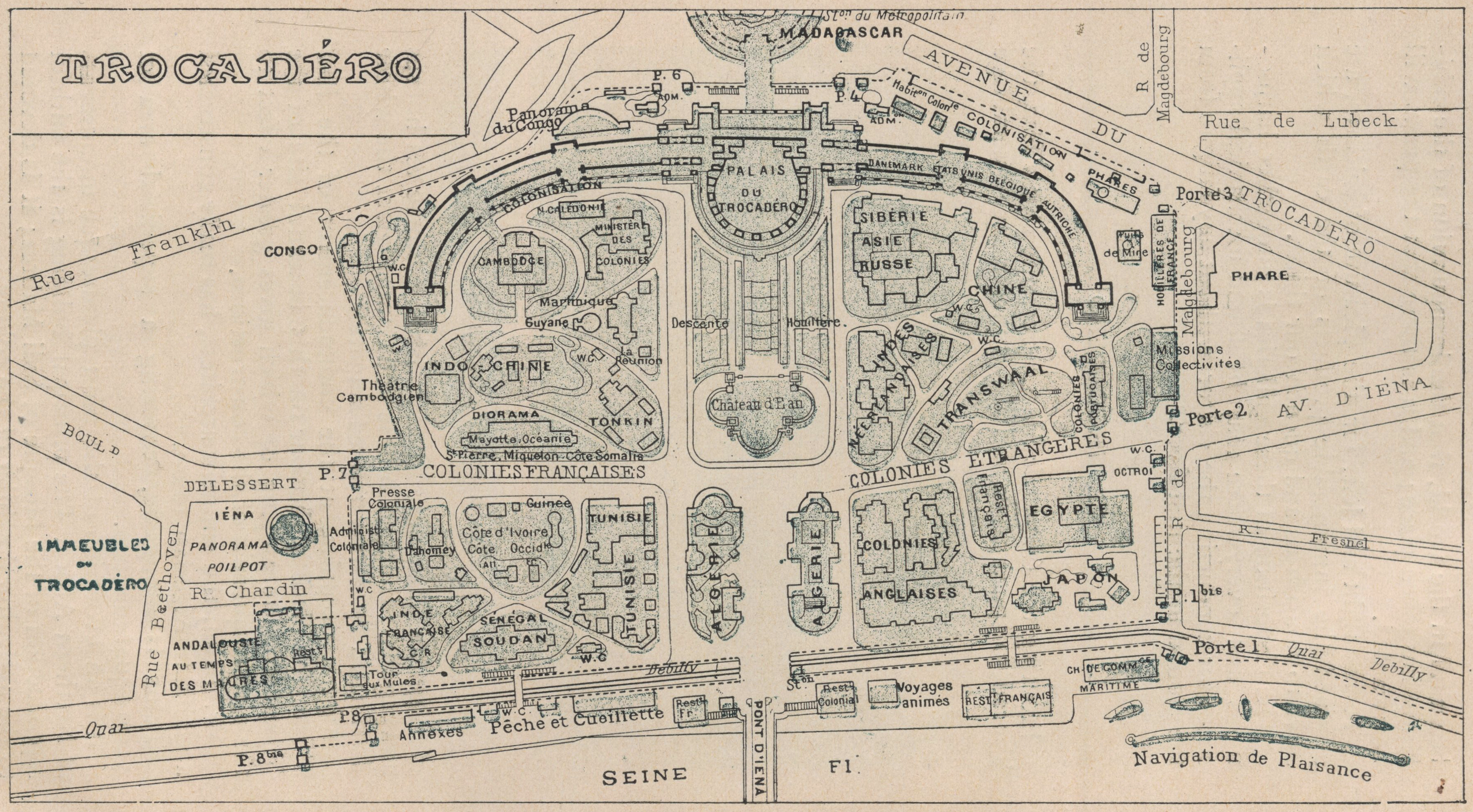
Plan of the exhibition pavilions in the palace gardens for the 1900 exhibition.

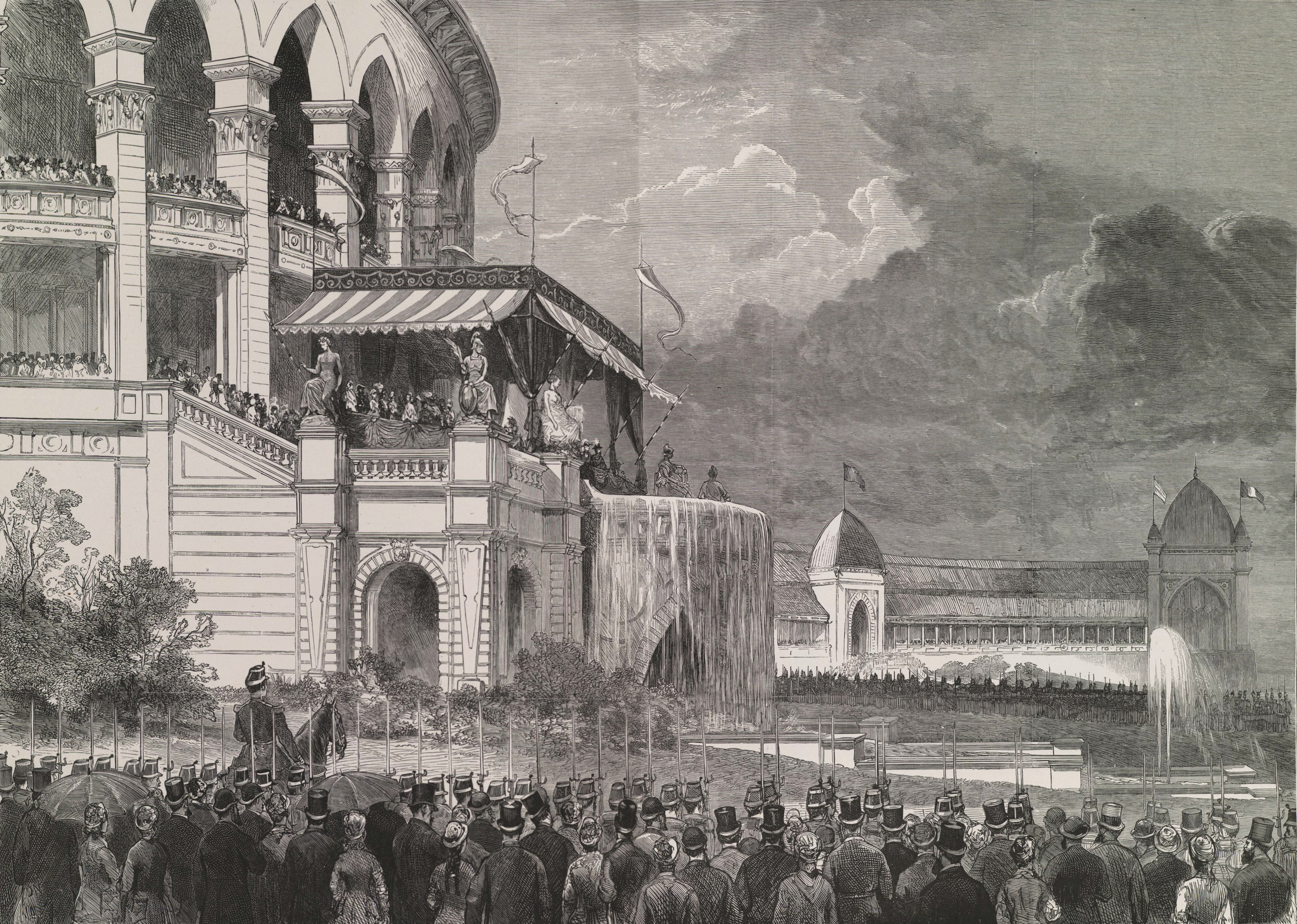
French President Patrice de Mac Mahon inaugurates the 1878 Exposition Universelle from the Trocadéro Palace.

The Trocadéro Palace was never intended to go beyond the exhibition stage, but in the end, it remained, due to its much higher cost than originally projected (twelve million gold francs instead of seven and a half million, which subsequently led the City of Paris to withdraw from the project, in favor of the State.

Alongside this, the Palais du Trocadéro hosted the Exposition Universelle of 1889 and 1900, whose installations were mainly located on the Champ-de-Mars (the most notable being the Eiffel Tower, also initially built on a temporary basis). On 15 April 1889, a supplement to Le Figaro noted: "If you want to get a good idea of the Exposition Universelle as a whole, the best way is to stand at the central point of the Trocadéro Palace, in the middle of the circular gallery overlooking the gilded statues of the five parts of the world. From there, the panorama is magnificent". For the 1900 exhibition, the pavilions of the French colonies and protectorates were set up in the palace gardens, and the Iéna bridge was "widened with wooden sidewalks" (it was completely enlarged in 1935, from 14 to 35 meters).

=== Controversial museum palace ===
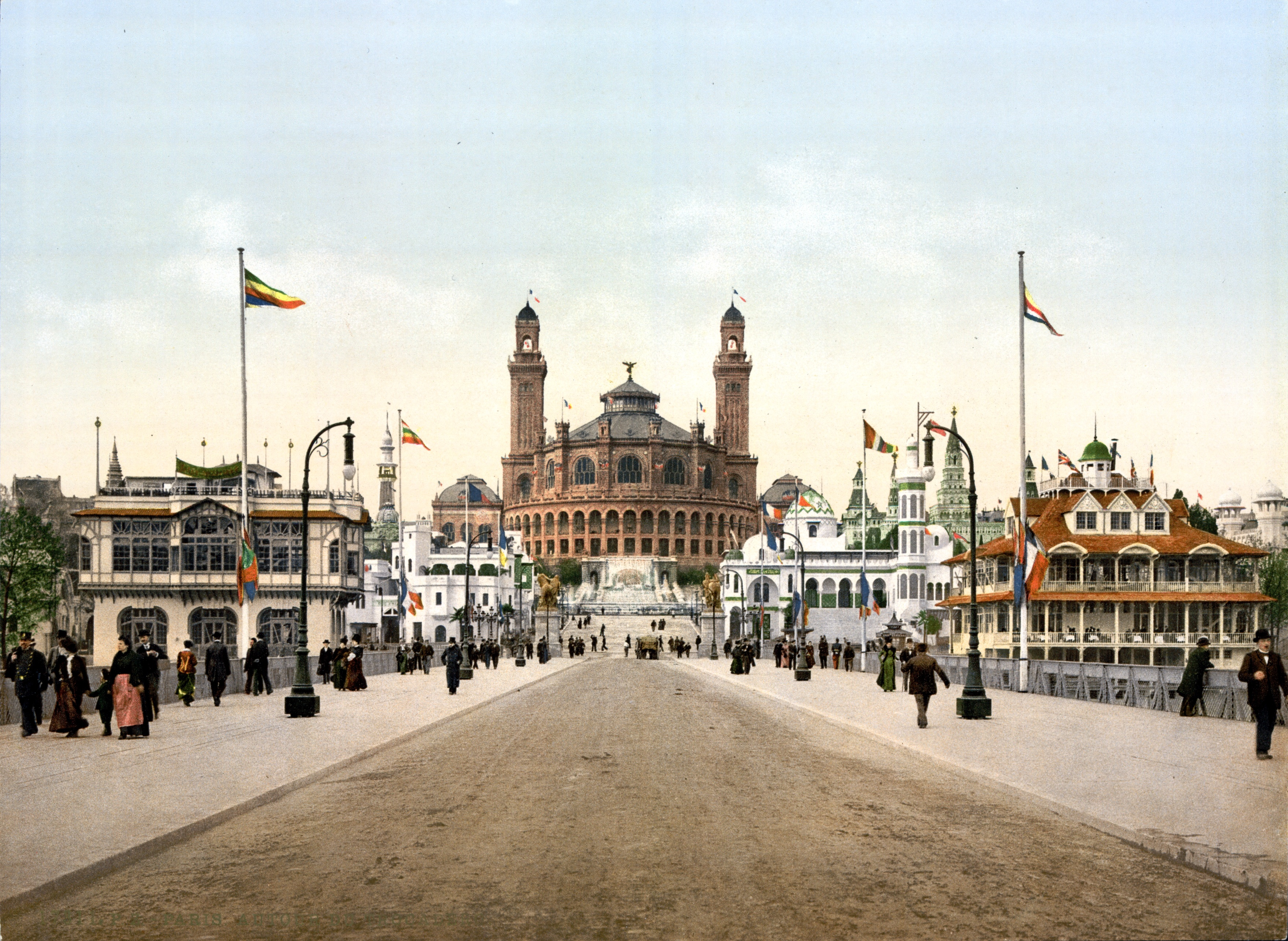
The palace at the 1900 Exposition Universelle; in the foreground, the pavilions of the invited powers.

The palace was home to the Musée des Monuments Français, created in 1879 by Eugène Viollet-le-Duc, and the first Paris ethnographic museum, founded by Ernest Hamy, forerunner of the Musée de l'Homme. The Trocadéro gardens were designed by Adolphe Alphand. From 1880, a popular observatory, founded by Léon Jaubert, was set up here. Between 1878 and 1925, an Indochinese museum, the result of discoveries made by explorer Louis Delaporte, occupied a third of the palace's Passy wing; the objects on display were then transferred to the Musée Guimet, with the exception of 624 plaster casts from the temple of Angkor, which remained at Trocadéro, donated in 1936 to the Musée des Monuments Français, housed in the new Palais de Chaillot. (Note: They were then carefully cut into pieces and stored until 1945 in the suburbs of Paris, then until 1973 in the basement of the Palais de Tokyo, then in the Abbey of Saint-Riquier in the Somme, a reserve of the Musée Guimet and the Musée National des Arts et Traditions Populaires; they have been restored since 2002.)

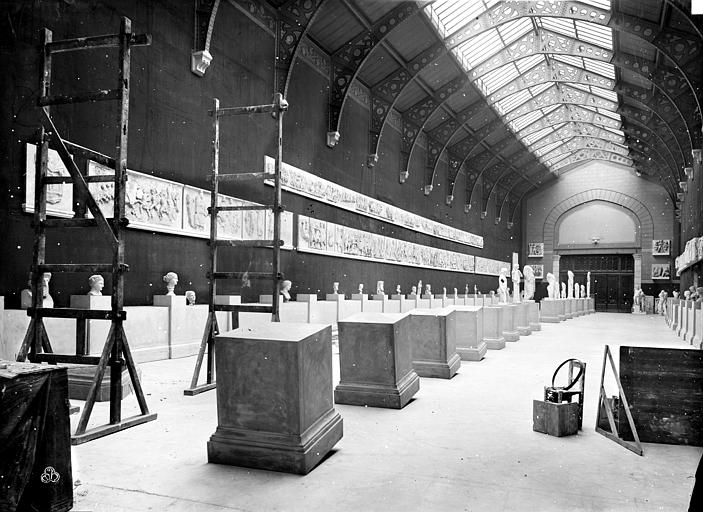
An exhibition room at the Musée des Monuments Français (comparative sculpture museum).

Unlike other Parisian monuments that were initially decried, but quickly accepted by elites and the general public (such as the Palais Garnier and the Eiffel Tower), the Trocadéro Palace was the subject of numerous and recurring criticisms in the decades following its construction: the disdain of architects and writers, a style deemed obsolete, and the faulty acoustics of the assembly hall.

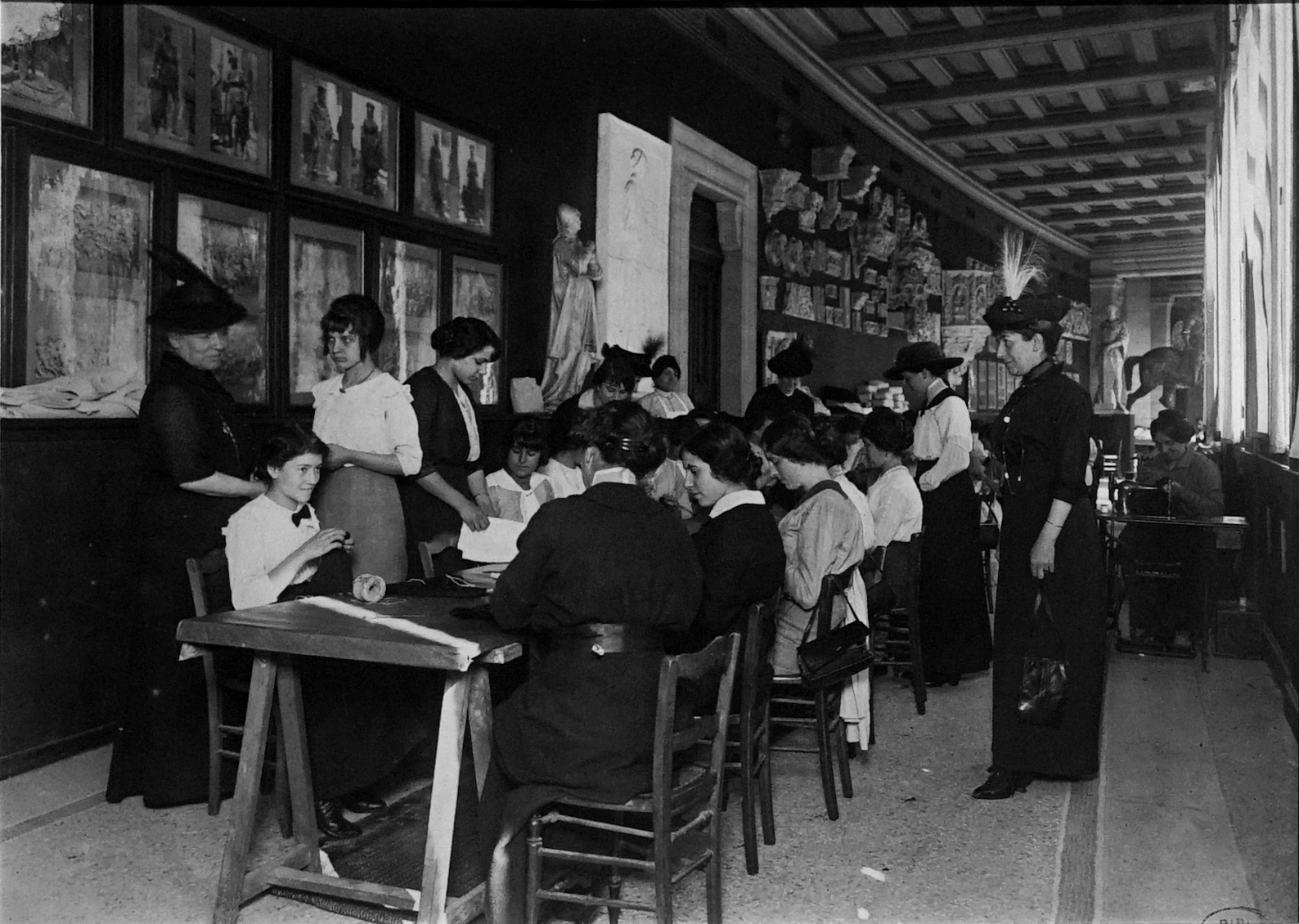
Madame de Talleyrand Workroom on 5 October 1914, charity ladies offering a meal and work to women.

Viollet-le-Duc nevertheless championed the project, but died in 1879. The press and other personalities mocked the building, such as the humorist Touchatout, who compared the statue overhanging the dome of the Assembly Hall to a "fly on the lid of a soup tureen", or Joris-Karl Huysmans, who referred to the palace as "the belly of a lying hydropic woman", while the writer André Billy declared "Down with the Trocadéro!" Julien Green spoke of Moorish "abominations" and modernist architect Georges-Henri Pingusson enthused that the 1937 exhibition had "the merit of liberating one of the most beautiful sites in Paris by demolishing the central building that had both damaged and obstructed it". In addition, the public reacted against the dilapidated ornamentation, which, planned for the 1878 exhibition only, had not been designed to last that long. Draughts from the galleries and acoustics in the main hall had also been a recurring problem since the building's construction, despite several attempts to remedy the situation. In fact, it was the architecture of the hall itself that was lacking. This conclusion led the architects to opt for the demolition of the village hall while retaining the two wings in 1937.

In the interwar period, the site was already referred to as the "vieux Trocadéro" (the old Trocadéro). As early as 1932, it was the subject of speculation as to its future, in preparation for the 1937 International Exhibition, thanks to a "competition of ideas": while the first project envisaged the exhibition taking place outside Paris, a study published the following year mentioned for the first time the demolition of the palace and the organization of the event on a Champ-de-Mars/Trocadéro axis. In the autumn of 1933, Anatole de Monzie, Minister of Education, who was then overseeing the field of Culture, supported a project to build a Cité des musées in place of the palace, "centered on a vast esplanade both open and covered by a gigantic 190-meter-wide portico, punctuated by 23 columns".

However, as economic difficulties piled up, the French government opted to "camouflage" the old palace, a less costly solution. Eight projects were selected in January 1935, won by the Carlu-Boileau-Azéma trio, who planned to permanently camouflage the palace so as to preserve the wings (originally, the two towers were also to remain). What was to become the old Palais du Trocadéro thus survived in part, with the surface area gained on the garden-side wings increasing the floor area from 17,000 to 41,000 m^{2}, the walls and columns being covered on the street side by stone slabs, the interior by partitions and the floor mosaics by a new covering. The new village hall will now be built underground.

=== Palace destruction ===
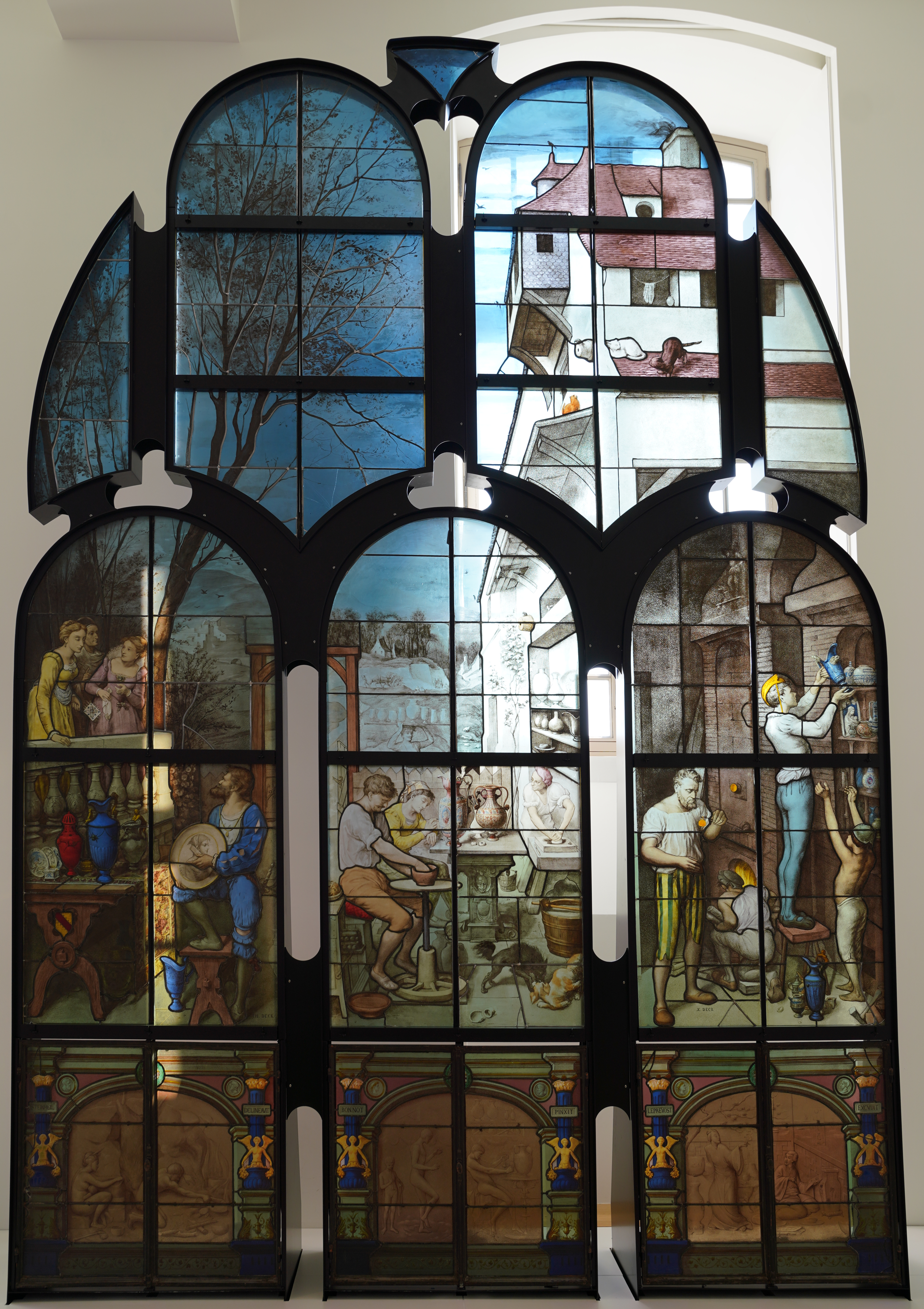
Palace stained-glass window removed.

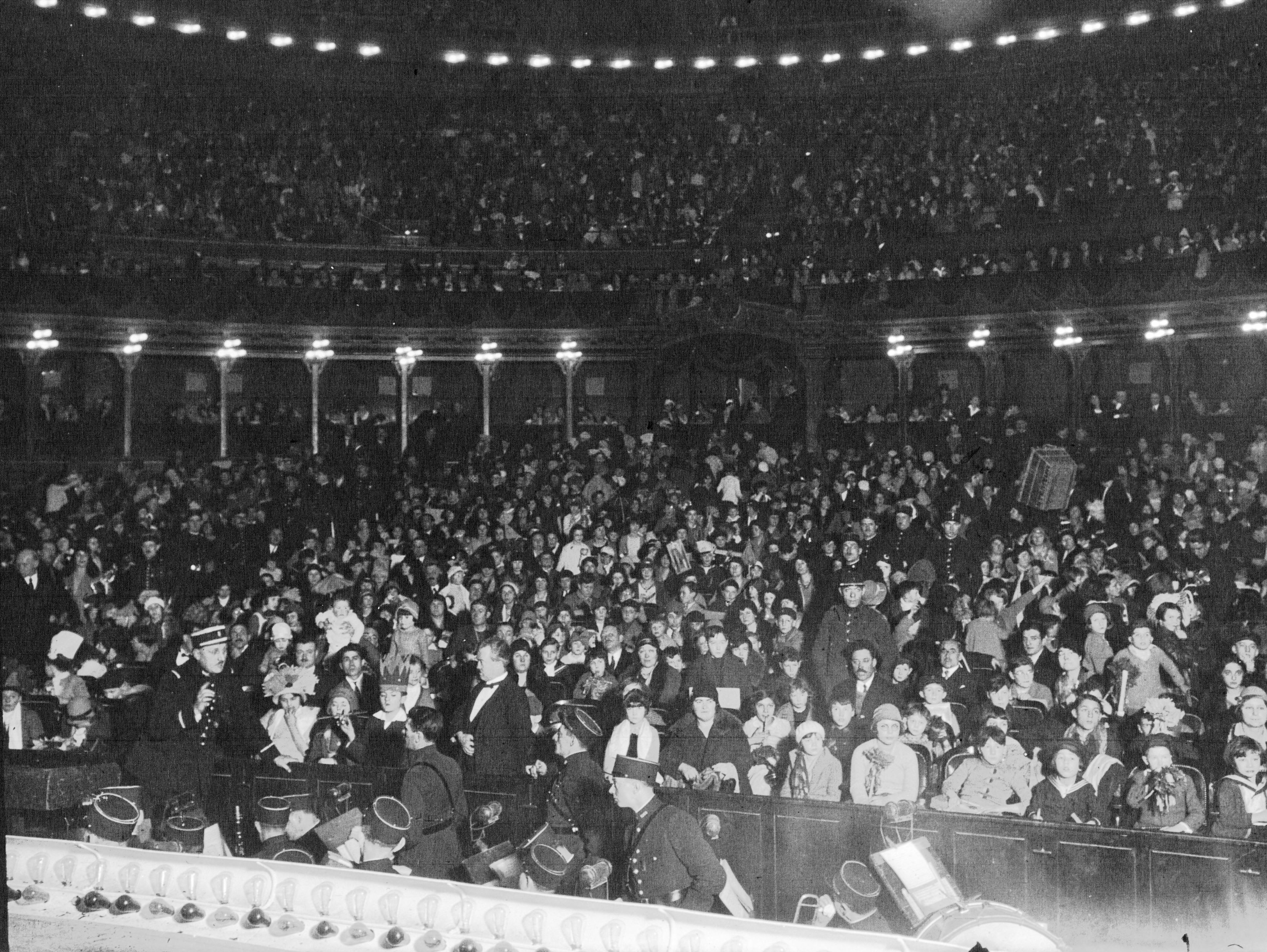
Christmas party 1932 in the grand hall of the Trocadéro Palace.

The palace was eventually demolished and replaced by the Palais de Chaillot, built for the 1937 specialized exhibition, which retained most of the original structure, except for the central part of the Palais du Trocadéro, which was replaced by an esplanade. Also preserved are the "curvilinear metal trusses in the cut sheet metal of the framework", visible in the museum's molding gallery. The demolition of the two towers was delayed by the difficulty of finding workers who were not afraid of heights, and by union demands that the 80 workers on the job "obtain payment of the customary hourly supplement for dangerous work, and the strict application of the eight-hour working day". During the general strike of 1936, workers throughout the site went on strike on 8 June; the Petit Journal noted: "The thousand or so workers on the exhibition site, like their comrades in the factories and stores, crossed their arms. But, happier than the other strikers, they are out in the fresh air, with the pleasant green gardens surrounding the Trocadéro to stretch out in. This half-demolished building is a sort of incoherent ruin. On top of the walls and frameworks still standing, the workers, silhouetted against the sky, sing and gesticulate. The more numerous workers below are trying to kill time. Sitting on piles of materials, most converse animatedly. Others are dozing under the trees. Still others, around an improvised conductor, try their hand at the chorus. Some hold out a tin trunk to passers-by".

Architects Jacques Carlu, Louis-Hippolyte Boileau and Léon Azéma were commissioned to design the project. They chose to "interweave" the wings of the old palace by "doubling them with a new gallery on the Seine side", but to demolish the auditorium and the two towers and replace them with a simple esplanade, on the "Eiffel Tower-École Militaire axis", while a "new theater hall [was] built under this square". The style of the new palace is "neo-classical monumentalist". The surface area of the new palace was increased from 17,000 m^{2} to 41,000 m^{2}.

The magazine La Nature noted in its issue for the second half of 1936: "A blow to the Trocadéro arcades: built to last for centuries, the old palace will have been demolished after fifty-seven years".

== Architecture ==
=== Palace ===
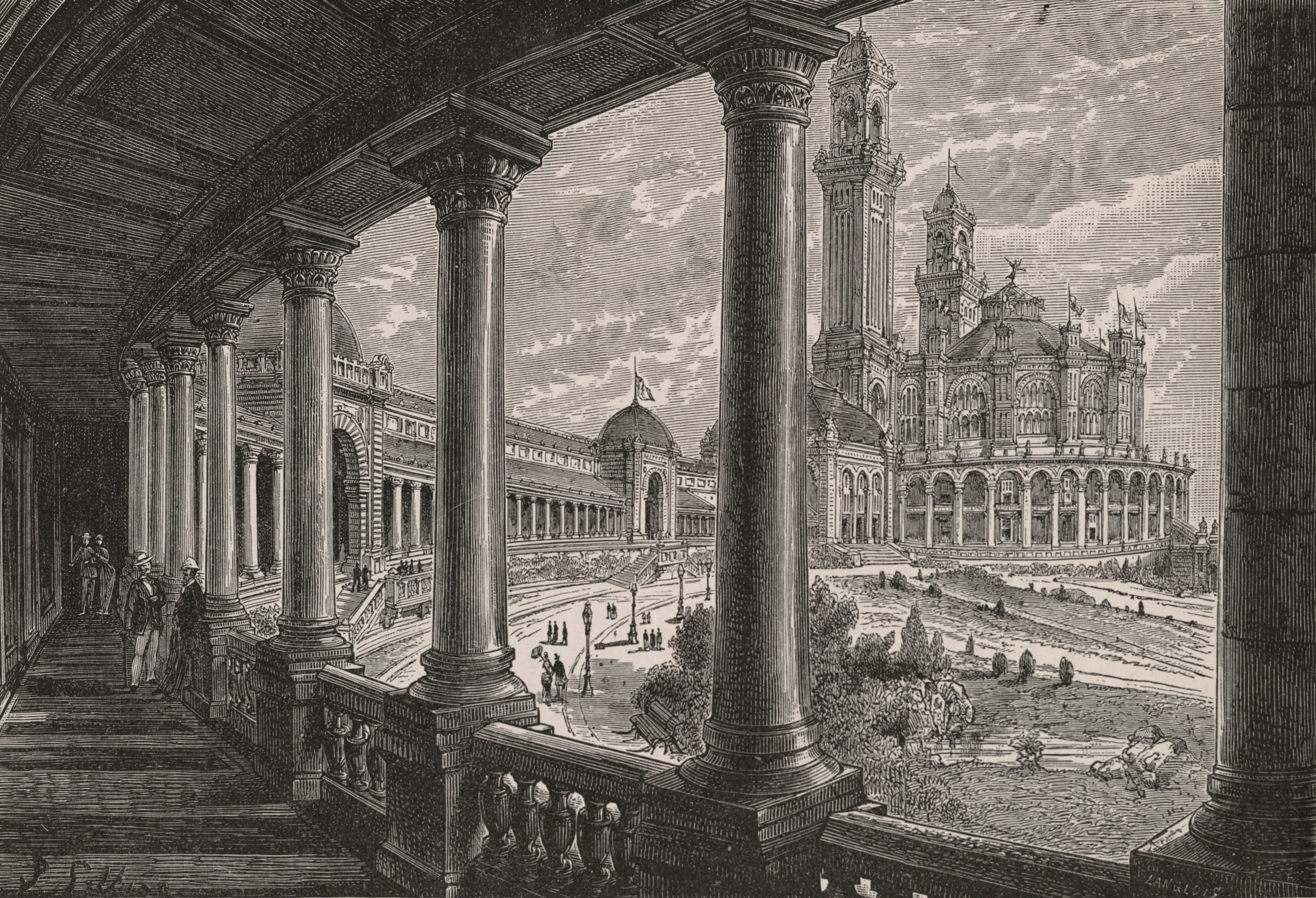
Promenade with colonnades, 1889.

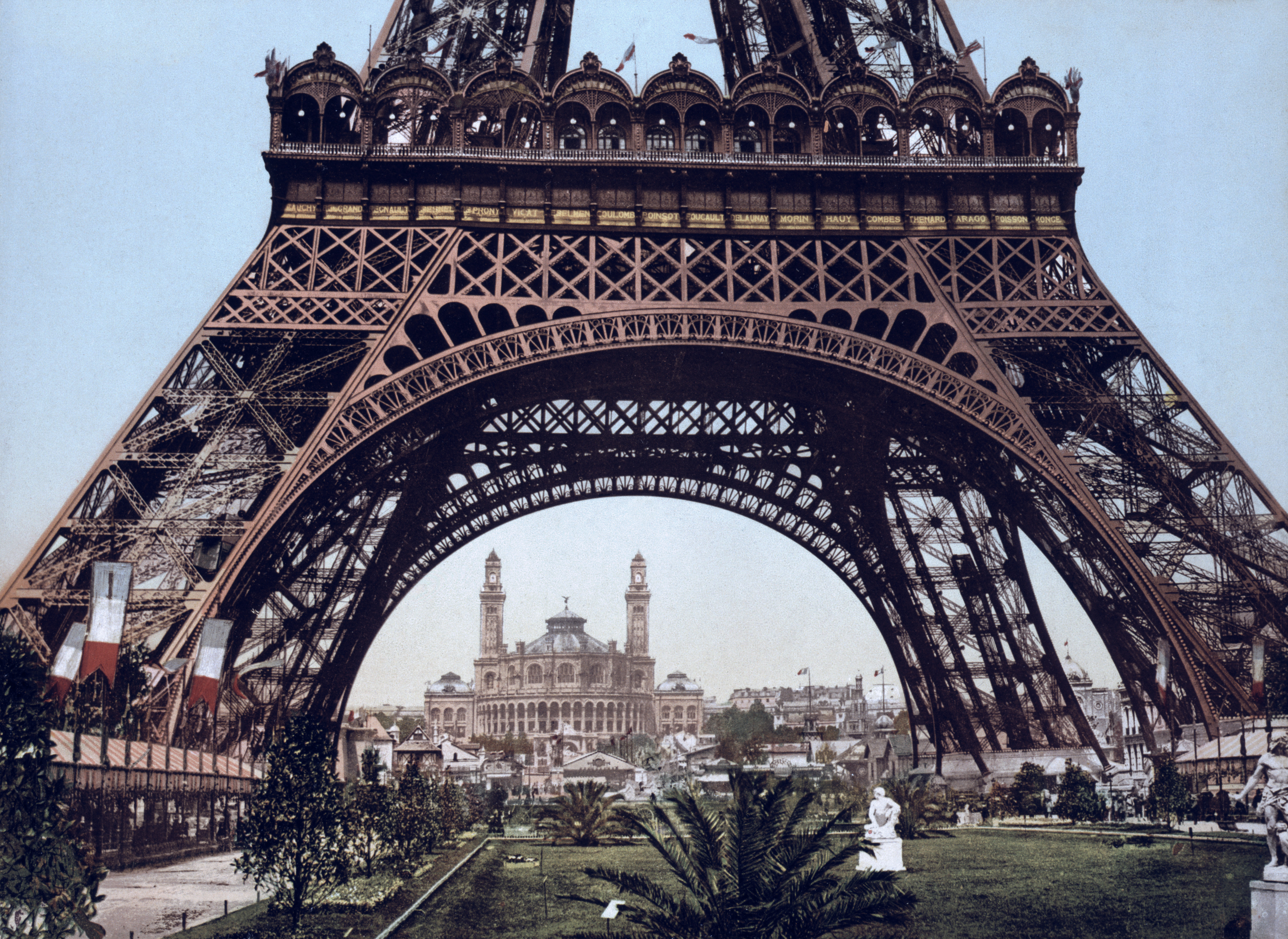
The Eiffel Tower and, in the background, the Trocadéro Palace, late 19th century.

The Trocadéro Palace was a building whose use is not necessarily in keeping with its name (palace), insofar as it houses an auditorium. This hall "was flanked by two square towers over 80 meters [82.50 meters] high. On either side, two long curvilinear wings extended the façade to 430 meters"; two pavilions join the festival hall, and these wings, to create a visual transition between the main hall and the slender wings. The two wings were each 200 meters long, and formed two galleries (the Passy wing and the Paris wing) punctuated by two intermediate pavilions and terminated by a head pavilion: architect Gabriel Davioud said that these two head pavilions, surmounted by a slate dome with golden edges, should be "massive enough to stop the eye at the extremities, and yet not fight with the central mass [the rotunda] which constitutes the raison d'être of the whole". Conference rooms were installed in the wings, which, on the garden side, featured a portico supported by marble columns along its entire length - including the party room -, freely open to the public; these galleries were soon equipped with lighting and, in the case of the party room, were later closed with glass windows.

"On the Trocadéro Palace side, a Flemish-inspired stepped gable wall was used to house the stage wall of the palace's large concert hall. In the projected state, an elevator and a spiral staircase gave the public access to the top of each of the towers with which it was flanked", although an elevator system had been planned but never implemented. At the time, these two towers, topped with gilded domes, were the tallest in France (those of Notre-Dame Cathedral in Paris were only 66 meters high). Many commentators associate them architecturally with minarets.

The architects chose to play with polychrome colors, such as Pompeian red plaster under the porticoes and Jura marble on the columns of the vestibules at the head pavilions. Some floors feature mosaics, created by the same company responsible for the mosaics at the Opéra Garnier. Other unusual features included glass paving stones and stained-glass windows.

=== Assembly hall ===
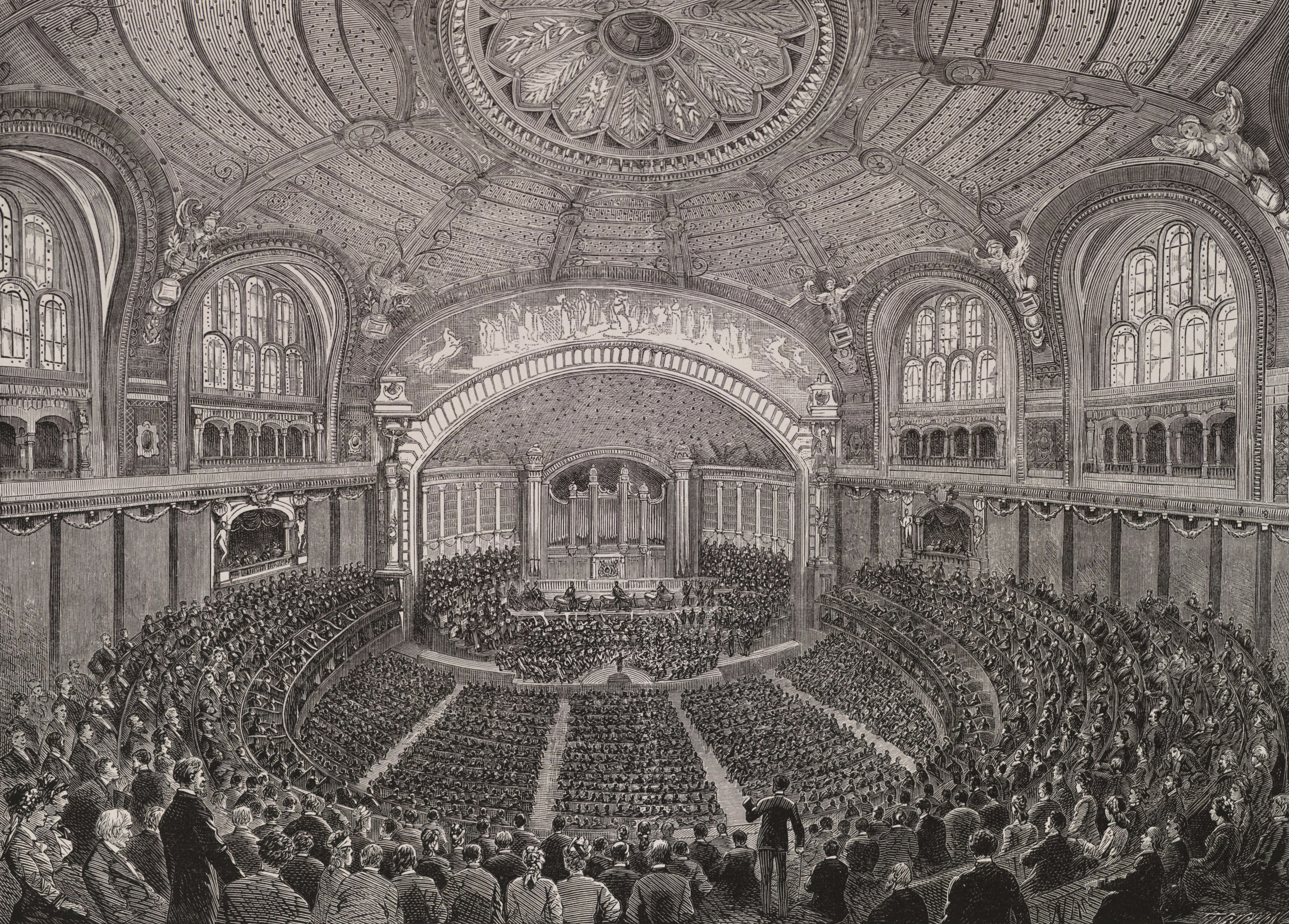
The assembly hall in 1879.

The palace's huge, semicircular hall could accommodate 4,600 people (compared with the 10,000 originally planned), and was used for concerts and conferences.

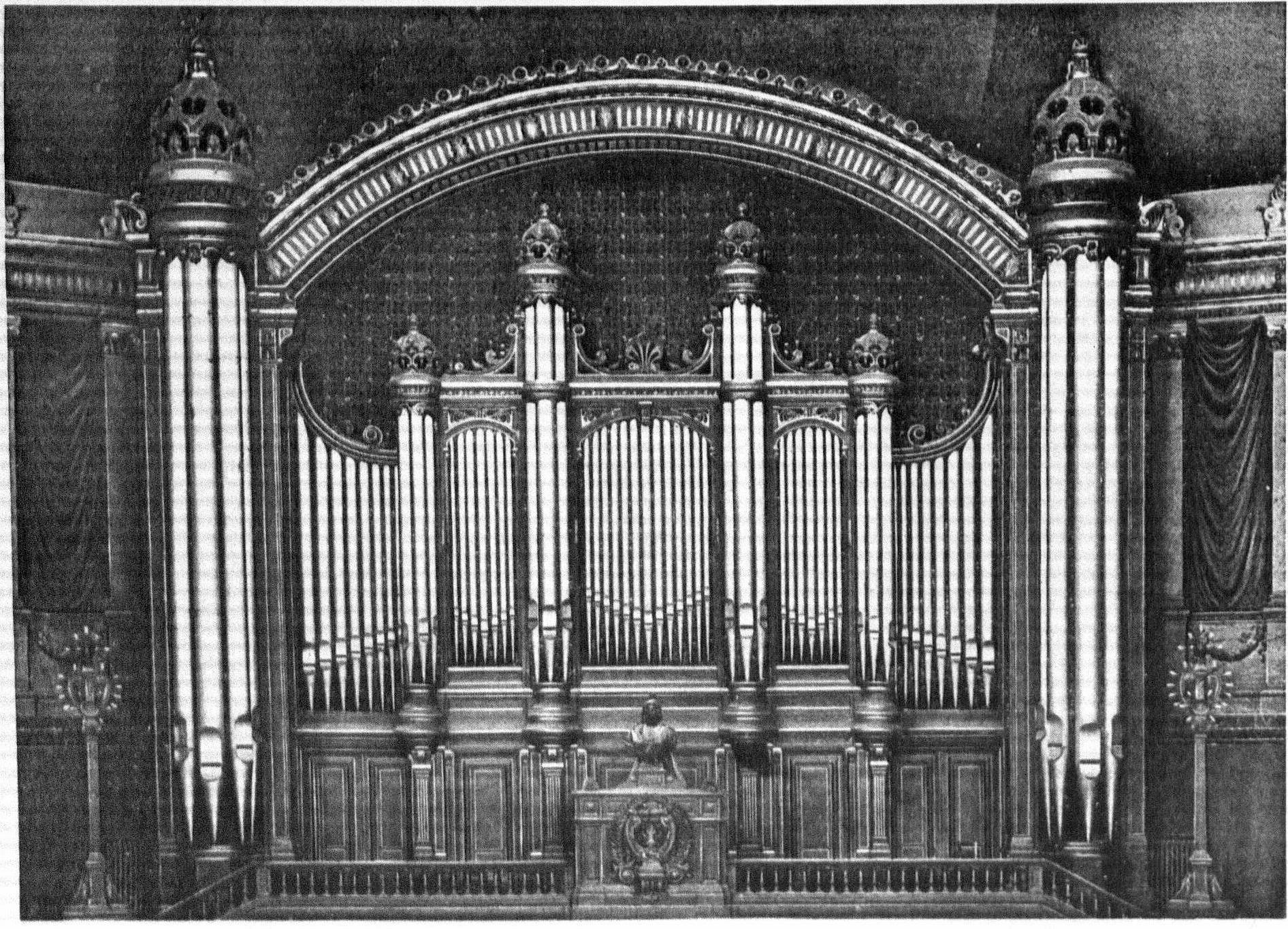
The organ in 1878

At the time, it was the largest hall in Paris (twice the size of the Garnier opera house). It was accessible from the Place du Trocadéro, after passing through a vestibule lit by a glass roof. The hall was decorated by Charles Lameire, who painted the large frieze overhanging the stage: La France sous les traits de l'Harmonie accueille les Nations. Pierced by nine bay windows (a modern architectural technique at the time) directly illuminating the large stage, the hall was crowned by a dome, surmounted on the outside by a statue by Antonin Mercié, La Renommée, while below, a gallery of sculptures punctuated the façade.

On 8 June 1878, a journalist from the weekly Le Monde artiste wrote of the first official concert presented in the hall: it was "truly grandiose [...], with a richness bordering on prodigality. Full as it was on Thursday, the hall offered a fairy-tale view. Almost all the gentlemen were in ceremonial dress, the ladies displaying grace, flowers, and diamonds... It's a fine place to be [...]. We just think that the serious question of acoustics needs further study, and we're not the only ones to think so". The auditorium's roof is supported by a metal framework 50 meters in diameter; Gabriel Davioud described it as follows: "12 crossbeams were joined at their feet by a belt of sheet metal and angle irons that prevented them from spreading apart. They were joined at the top by a 15-meter-diameter ring designed to support the large lantern. The total height of these frames was 25 meters, bringing the height of the top of the lantern above the first floor to 57 meters".

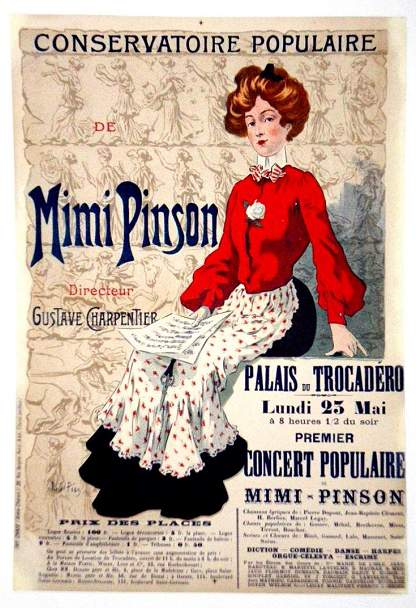
Poster for a popular Mimi Pinson concert held at the Trocadéro Palace in 1903.

It housed an organ built by Aristide Cavaillé-Coll, with a case designed by Raulin and Dumas. Inaugurated on 8 August 1878, by Alexandre Guilmant, it was originally intended for the church of Notre-Dame-d'Auteuil (it was upgraded when it was transferred). Despite its 66 stops, 72 registers, 1,470 pipes, and 32 feet, it is not the largest organ in France, but rather the first concert organ installed in the country. The instrument was first transferred to the modern-day Palais de Chaillot, before moving permanently to Lyon, where it became the organ of the Auditorium Maurice-Ravel.

It was here that Camille Saint-Saëns's Symphonie avec orgue (Symphony with organ) was performed for the first time. The hall became known as a venue for organ concerts, then recitals, although its poor reputation for sound and technique (too much room for the organ, lack of dressing rooms, no stage clearances, almost impossible to modulate lighting, difficult to evacuate in the event of a disaster, etc.) eventually scared off both prestigious and popular orchestras, making it difficult to fill given its size. At the 1878 Exposition Universelle, the average audience was 3,000, for a hall that could hold 4,600. In 1920, stage director Lugné-Poe declared: "the Trocadéro auditorium is appalling. It is a convention hall and not a theater [...]: the surest way to kill young actors is to have them perform in this hall, which only a few singers can resist". After 1878, apart from organ concerts, the hall was mainly used for political and republican association conventions, such as the Fête des Écoles on 13 July 1880.

In April 1920, Pierre Rameil, rapporteur for the Beaux-arts budget, announced the transformation of the Trocadéro into the Théâtre national populaire, directed by Firmin Gémier. Its location, far from working-class neighborhoods, and the nature of the hall, which was not very conducive to theater, led to a scaling back of these ambitions, despite a few successes, before becoming an empty shell: "when Gémier died in 1933, the Théâtre national populaire was no more than an empty title, a bad garage for shows without prestige".

=== Gardens and ornaments ===
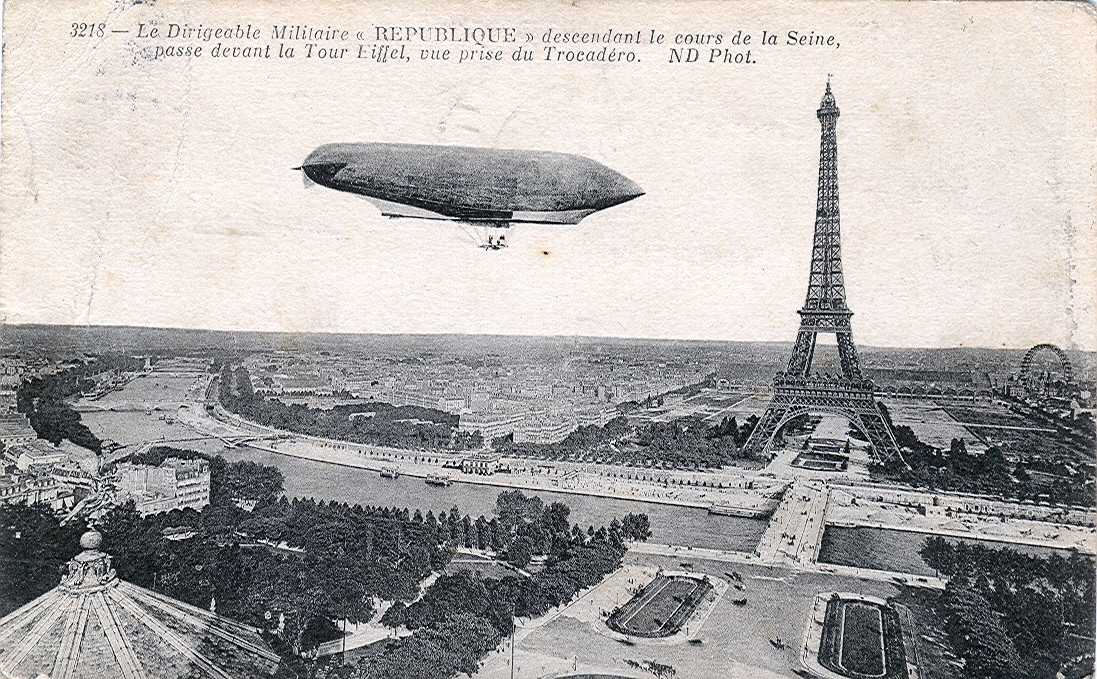
A dirigible flying over the Trocadéro gardens, 1908–1909

Engineer Adolphe Alphand, a specialist in Parisian gardens and staging waterfalls, is responsible for the exterior spaces. (Note: Alphand's gardens were replaced in 1937 when the new Palais de Chaillot was built.) The gardens were organized around a cascading fountain. They feature a dozen statues, including four animals - Le Bœuf by Auguste Caïn, Le Cheval à la Herse by Pierre Louis Rouillard, Le Jeune éléphant pris au piège by Emmanuel Frémiet and Le Rhinocéros by Henri Alfred Jacquemart - facing the Seine and the Champ-de-Mars palace built opposite by Léopold Hardy for the 1878 Exposition Universelle.

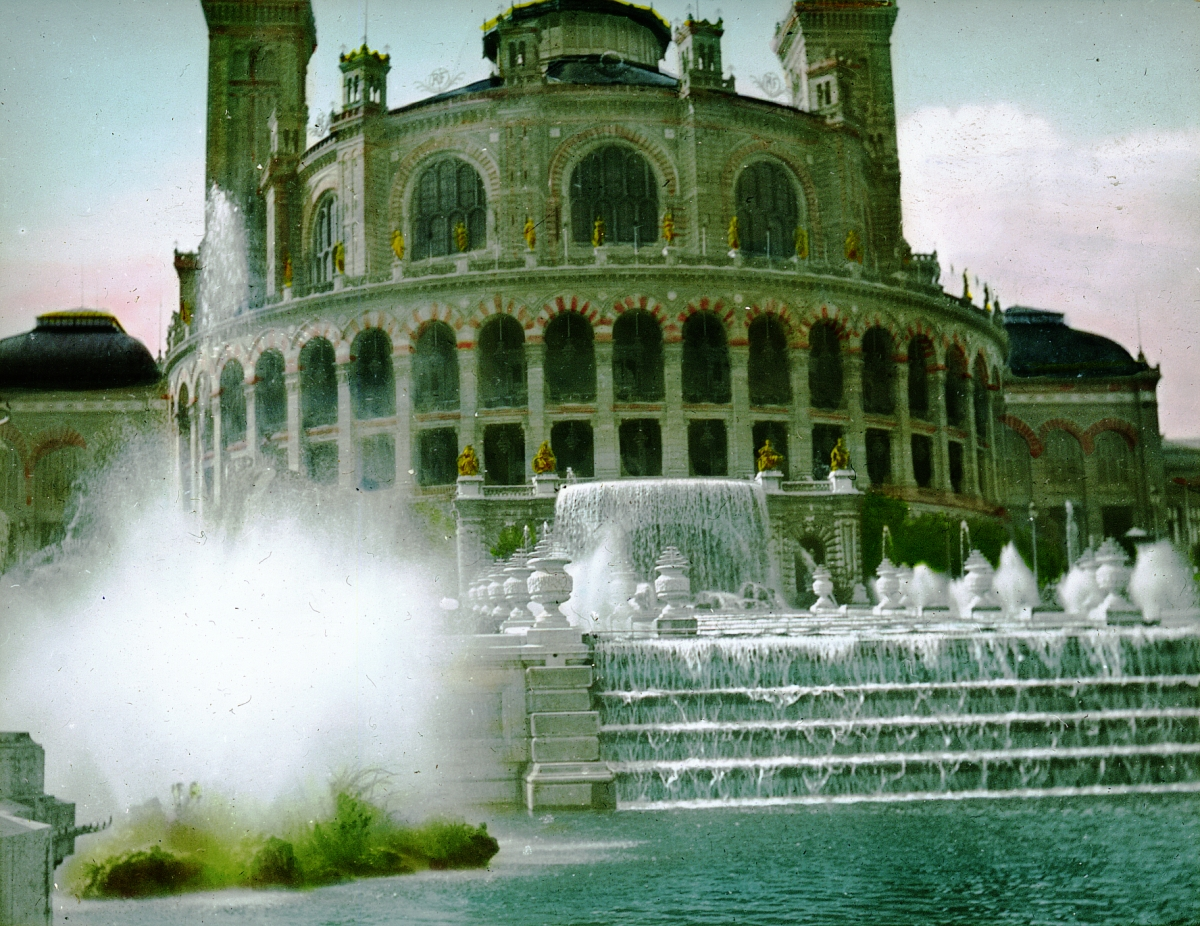
The fountain in 1900.

Numerous sculptures adorned the Trocadéro Palace, notably on the garden side of the building and in the park. Six allegories of the continents bordered the terrace overlooking the gardens (North America, South America, Oceania, Africa, Asia and Europe). The large cascading pool was surrounded by four gold-coated cast-iron animal statues (an elephant, a rhinoceros, an ox and a horse). On the Place du Trocadéro side, a series of statues were planned for the gable wall, but their absence from the palace photographs suggests that they were never built. La Renommée, by Mercié, is a statue of a "winged, draped and ringing woman", crowning the large dome of the Salle des Fêtes.

=== Disposal of dismantled parts ===
While the general structure of the wings and certain underpinnings were preserved (notably the underground galleries designed by Viollet-le-Duc, which remain), the ornaments were removed and relocated.

- The statues of the continents (originally in cast iron, gilded) and those of the animals are now on the Musée d'Orsay forecourt, except for that of the Le Boeuf (wrongly presented as a bull), which is in the bullfighting town of Nîmes.
- Seven of Rodin's mascarons are in the Parc de Sceaux. The 14 mascarons in the Jardin des Serres d'Auteuil were not dismantled.
- "The thirty monumental stone statues personifying the sciences, arts, and techniques that crowned the high terrace of the Great Hall [... are] scattered across France, from Ligny-en-Barrois (Meuse) for Ethnography and Chemistry, to Nantes (Loire-Atlantique) for the Sculpture, the Industrie forestière, the Botanique and the Agriculture, and even Agde (Hérault) for the Navigation ». The Keystone photo agency noted before their dismantling that they seemed to be "taking one last look at Paris before leaving". Adolphe Itasse's Uranie was awarded to the town of La Roche-sur-Yon. It has been on display in Square Bayard since the summer of 1936.
- A glass roof from the palace depicting the history of ceramics is on display at the Cité du Vitrail in Troyes.

==== Statue gallery ====
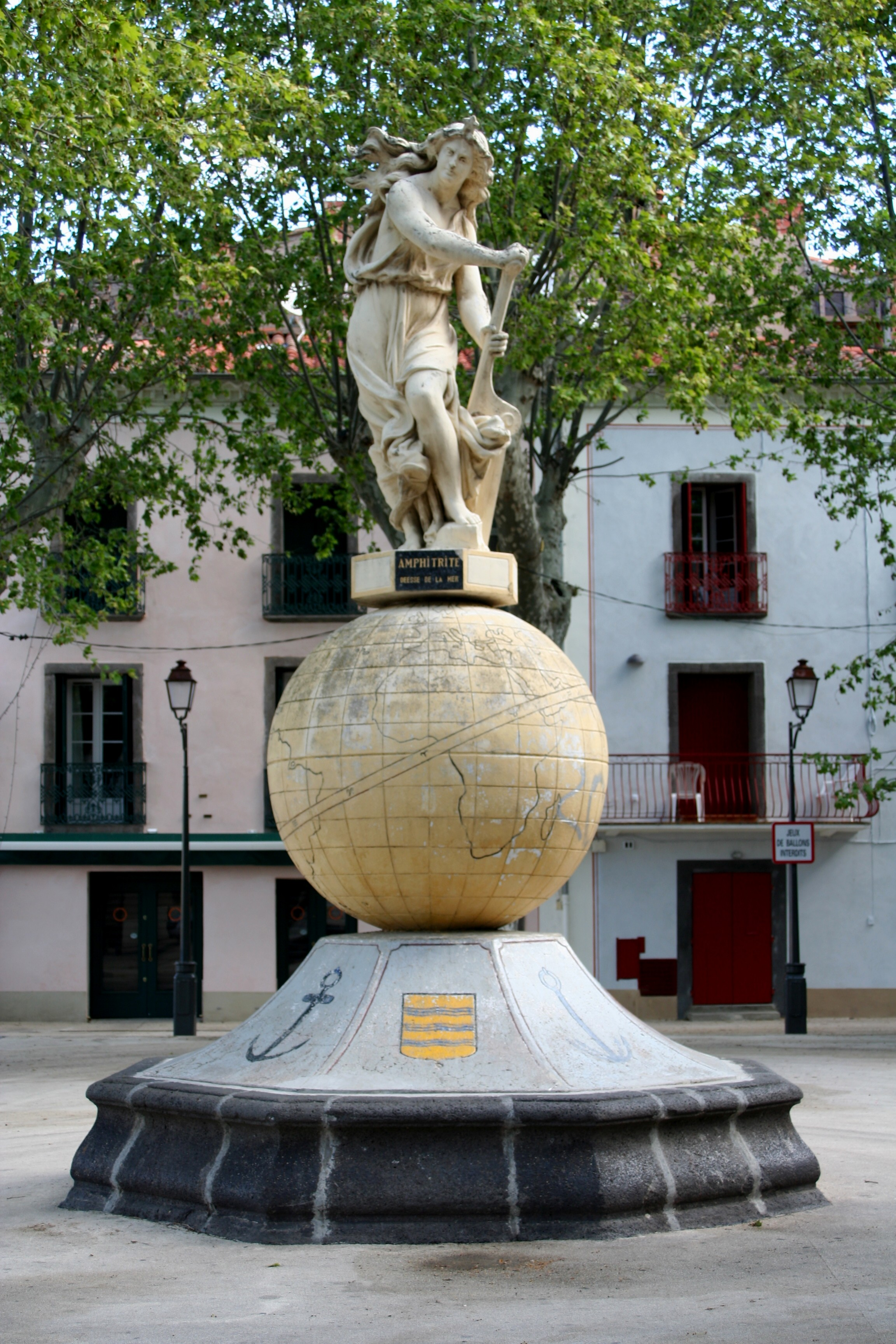
Navigation by Léon François Chervet adorned the pediment of the palace. Renamed Amphitrite, it now stands in Place de la Marine, Agde.

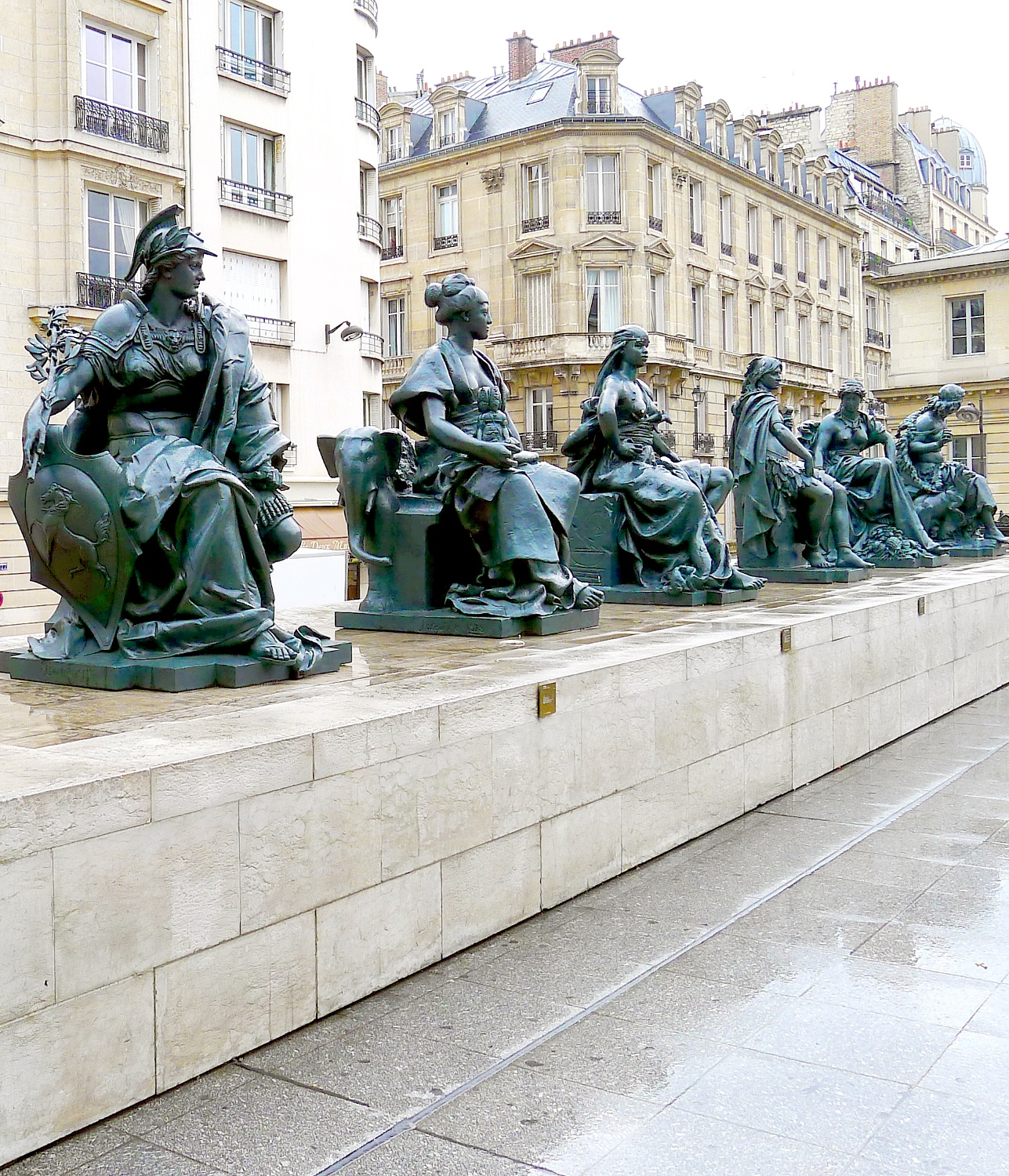
The Statues of the Six Continents, now in front of the Musée d'Orsay.

The Continents statues that once adorned the façade of the Palais du Trocadéro were reinstalled in 1985 on the Musée d'Orsay esplanade, along the rue de Lille.

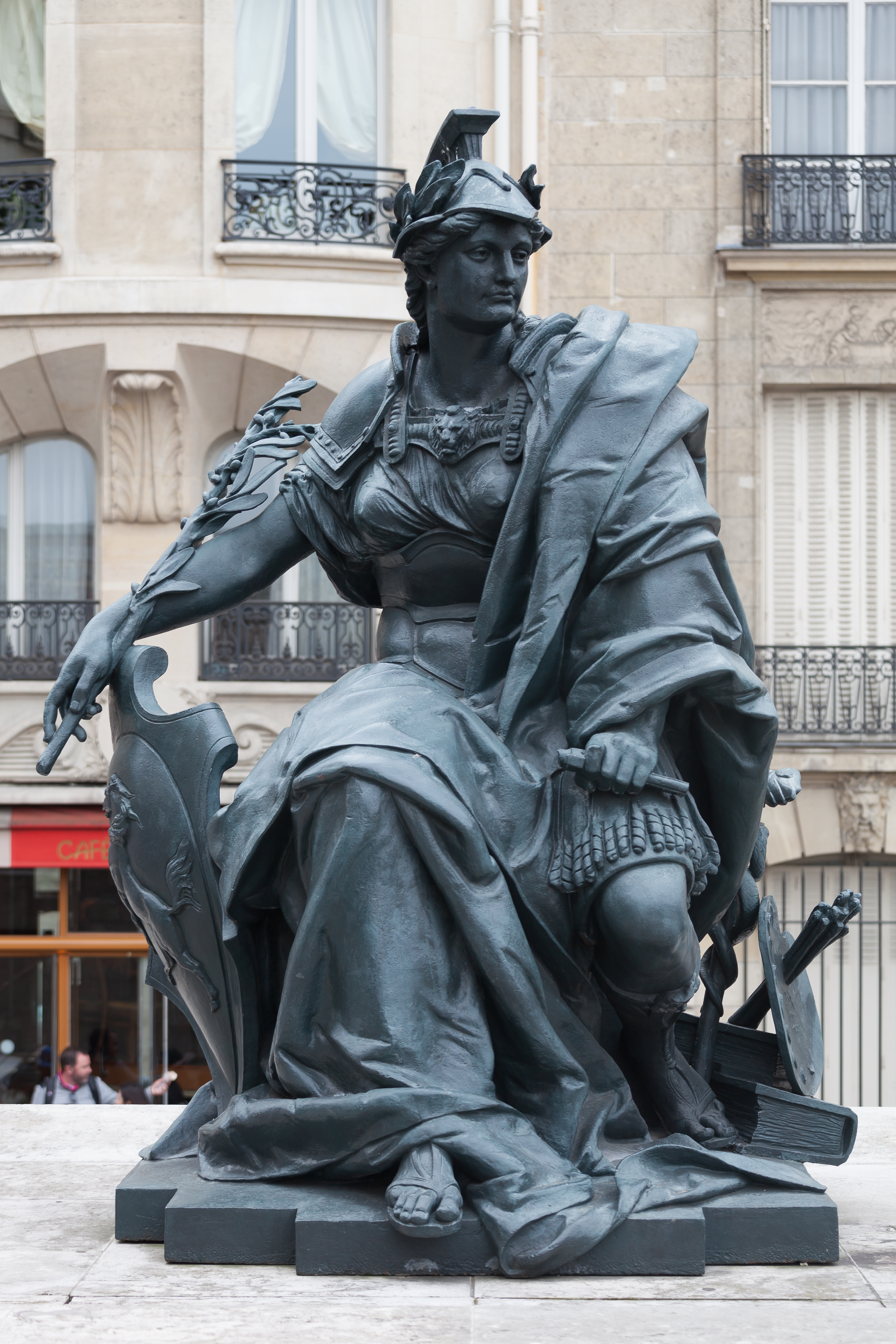
L'Europe by Alexandre Schoenewerk.

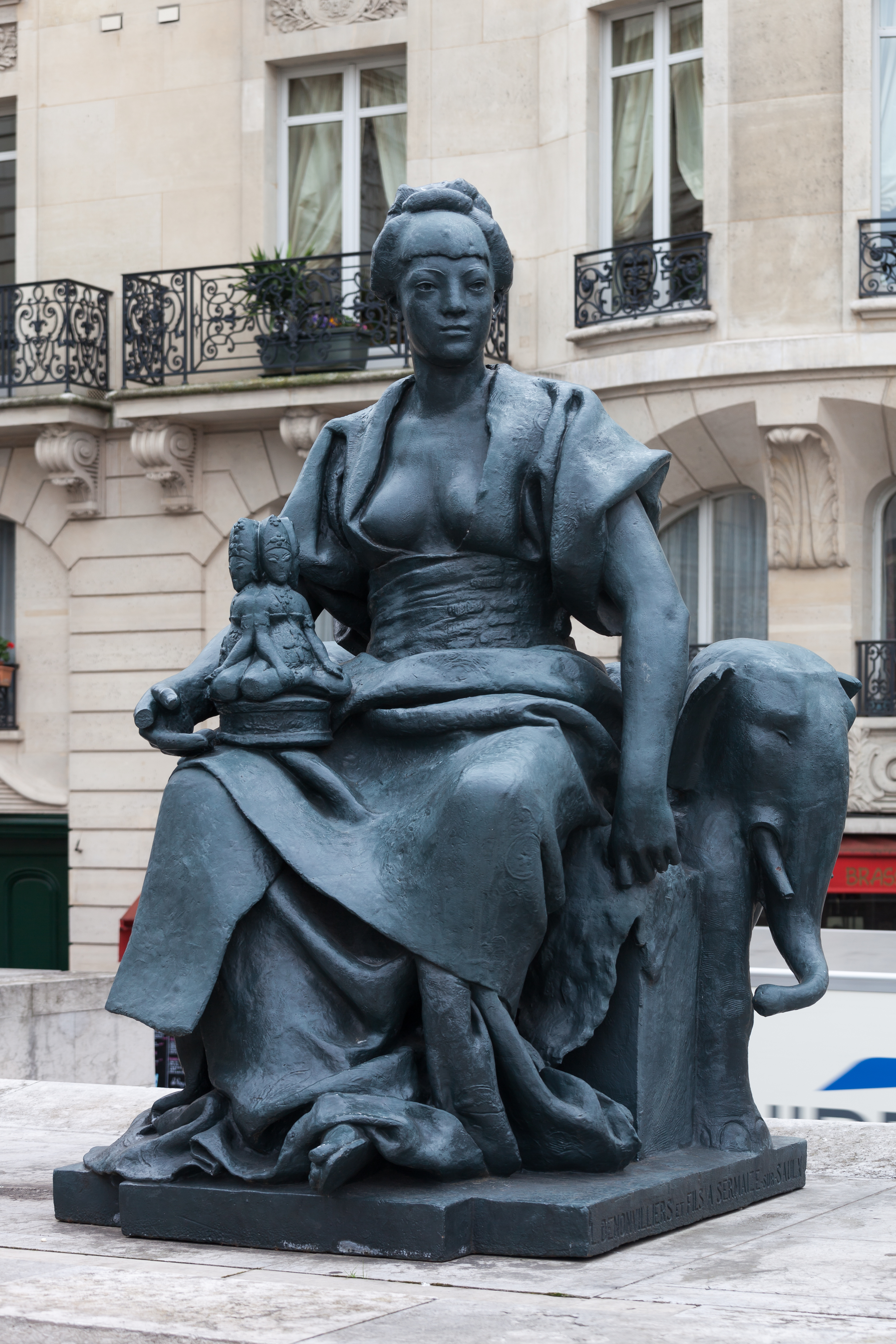
L'Asie by Alexandre Falguière.

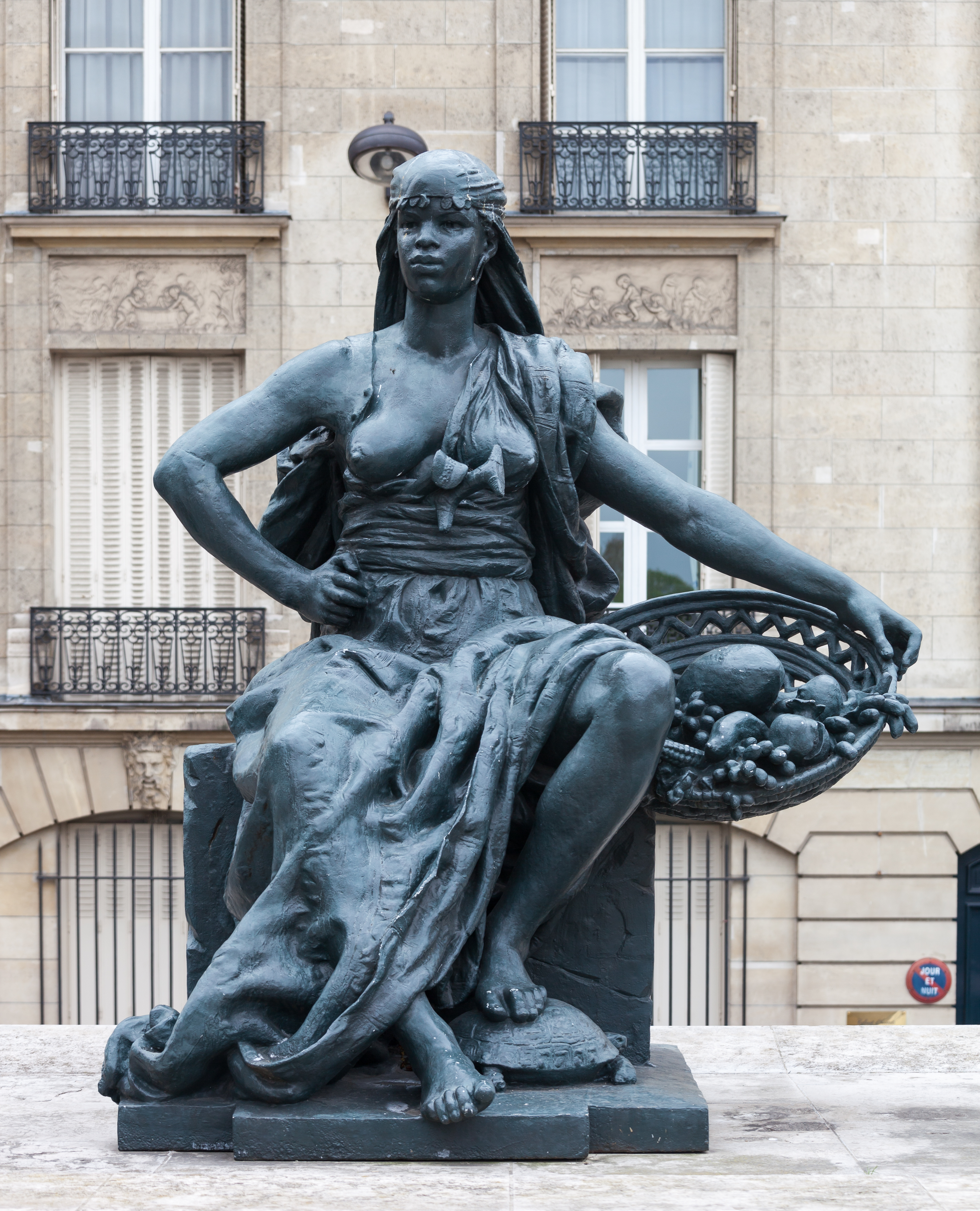
L'Afrique by Eugène Delaplanche.

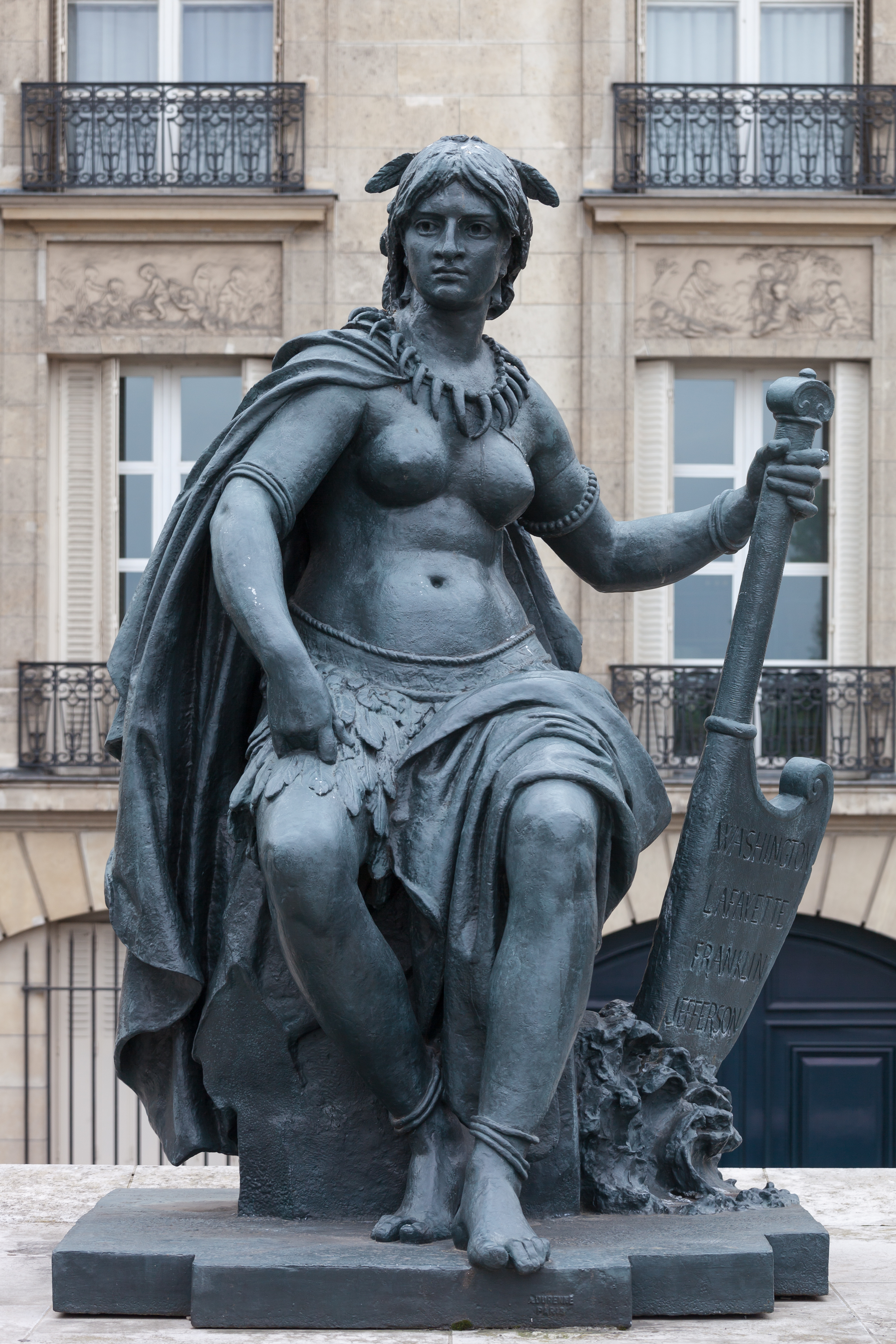
L'Amérique du Nord by Ernest-Eugène Hiolle.

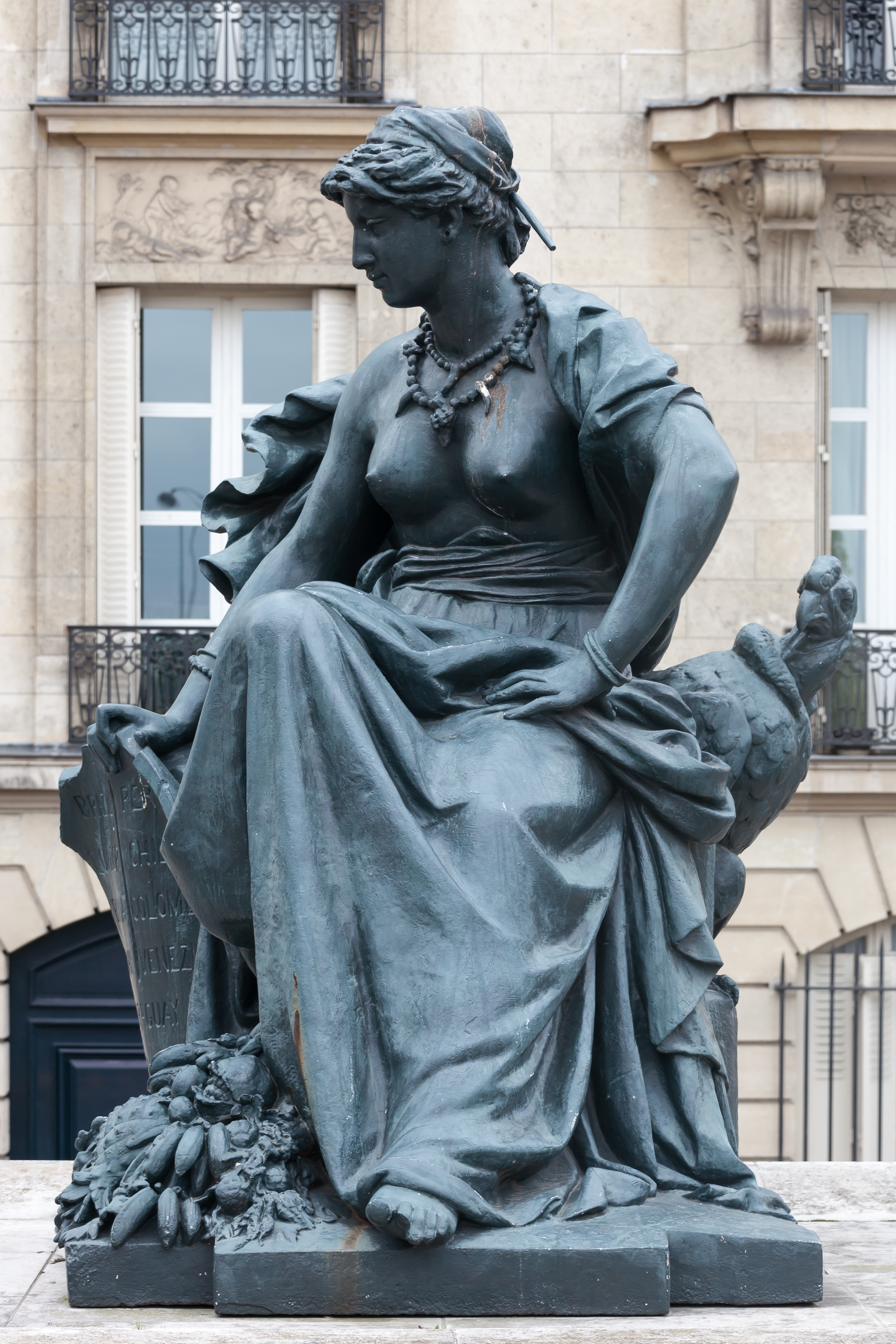
L'Amérique du Sud by Aimé Millet.

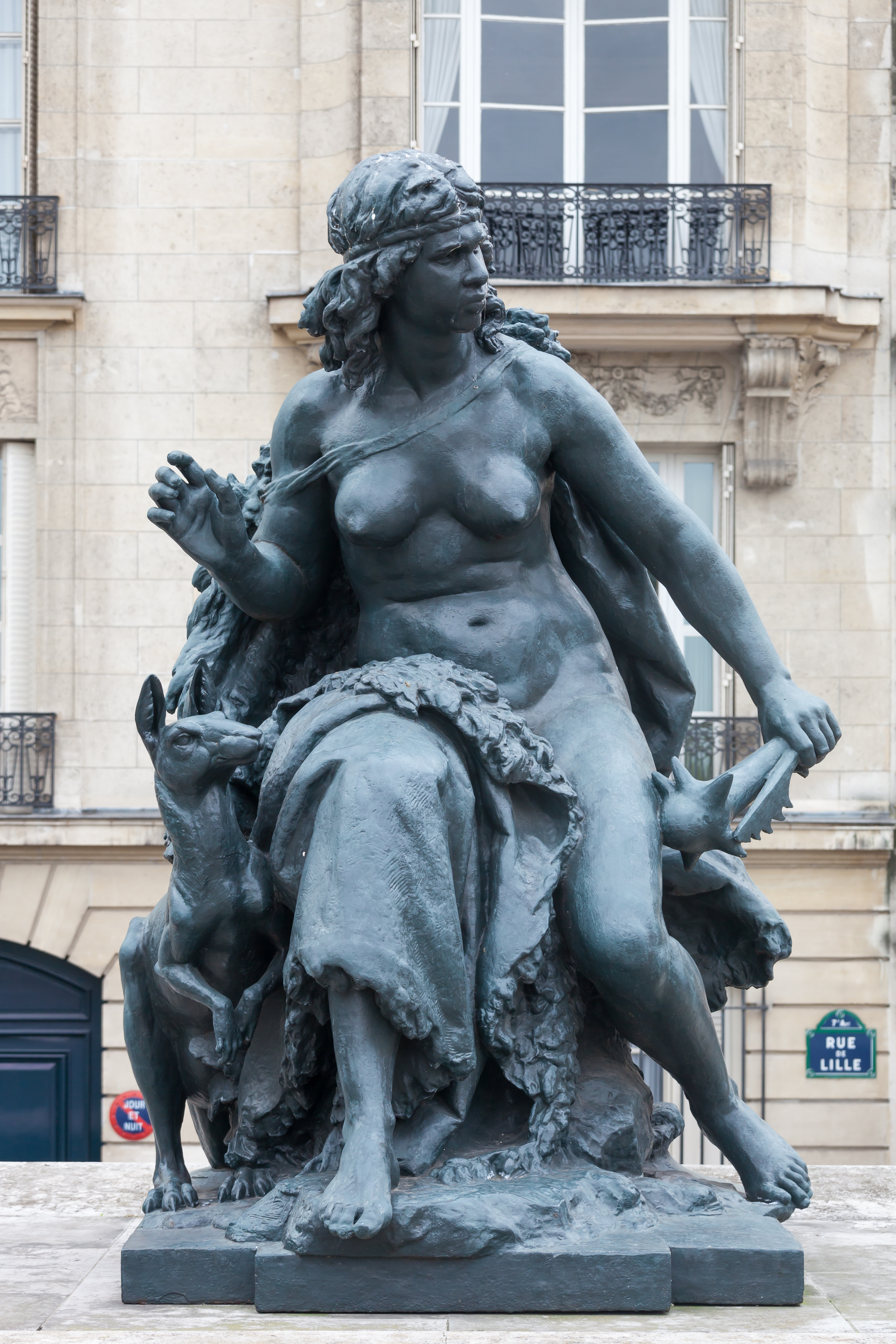
L'Océanie by Mathurin Moreau.

Three of the four monumental animal statues that surrounded the Trocadéro Fountain also found their way onto the Orsay forecourt at the same time: le rhinocéros, le cheval à la herse and l'éléphant. From 1935 to 1985, they were exhibited at Place de la Porte-de-Saint-Cloud (16th arrondissement), before being restored the following year at the Coubertin foundry in Saint-Rémy-les-Chevreuse. As for Le bœuf (actually a bull), it has been in Nîmes since 1937, on Jean-Jaurès boulevard. Contrary to a persistent legend, Isidore Bonheur's Les Taureaux, in front of Parc Georges-Brassens (15th arrondissement), did not come from the Trocadéro.

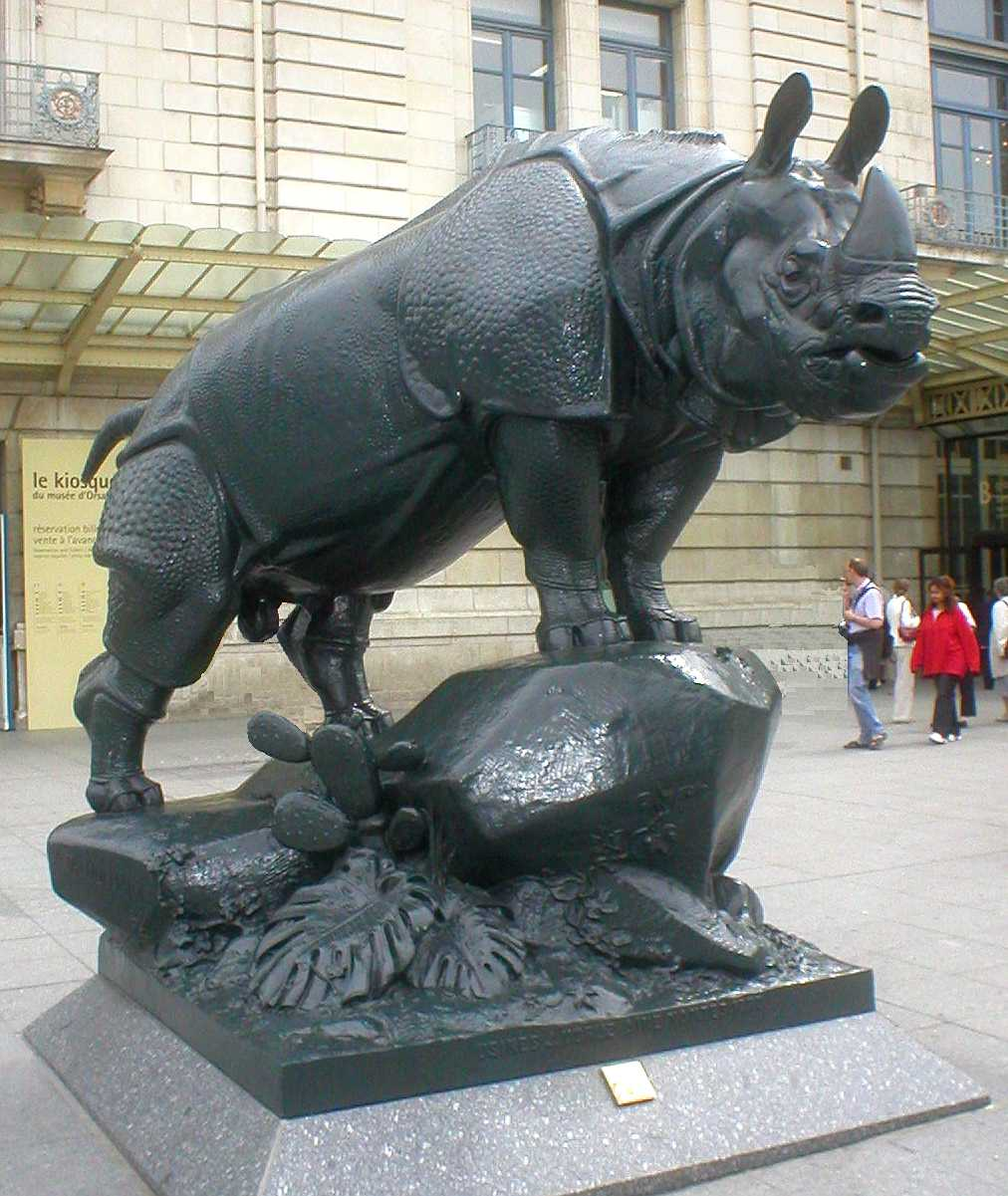
Le rhinocéros by Henri-Alfred Jacquemart.

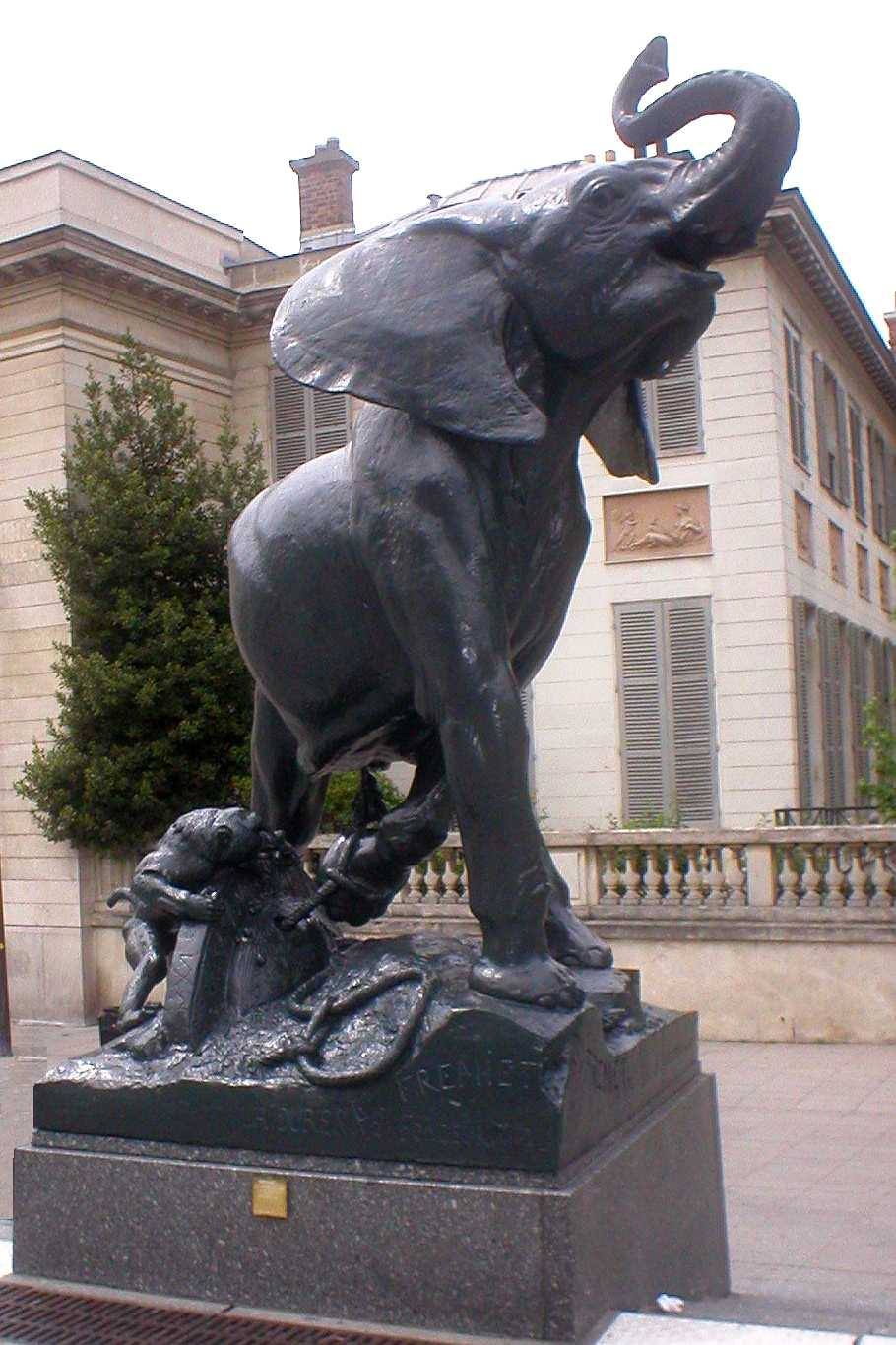
Jeune éléphant pris au piège by Emmanuel Frémiet.

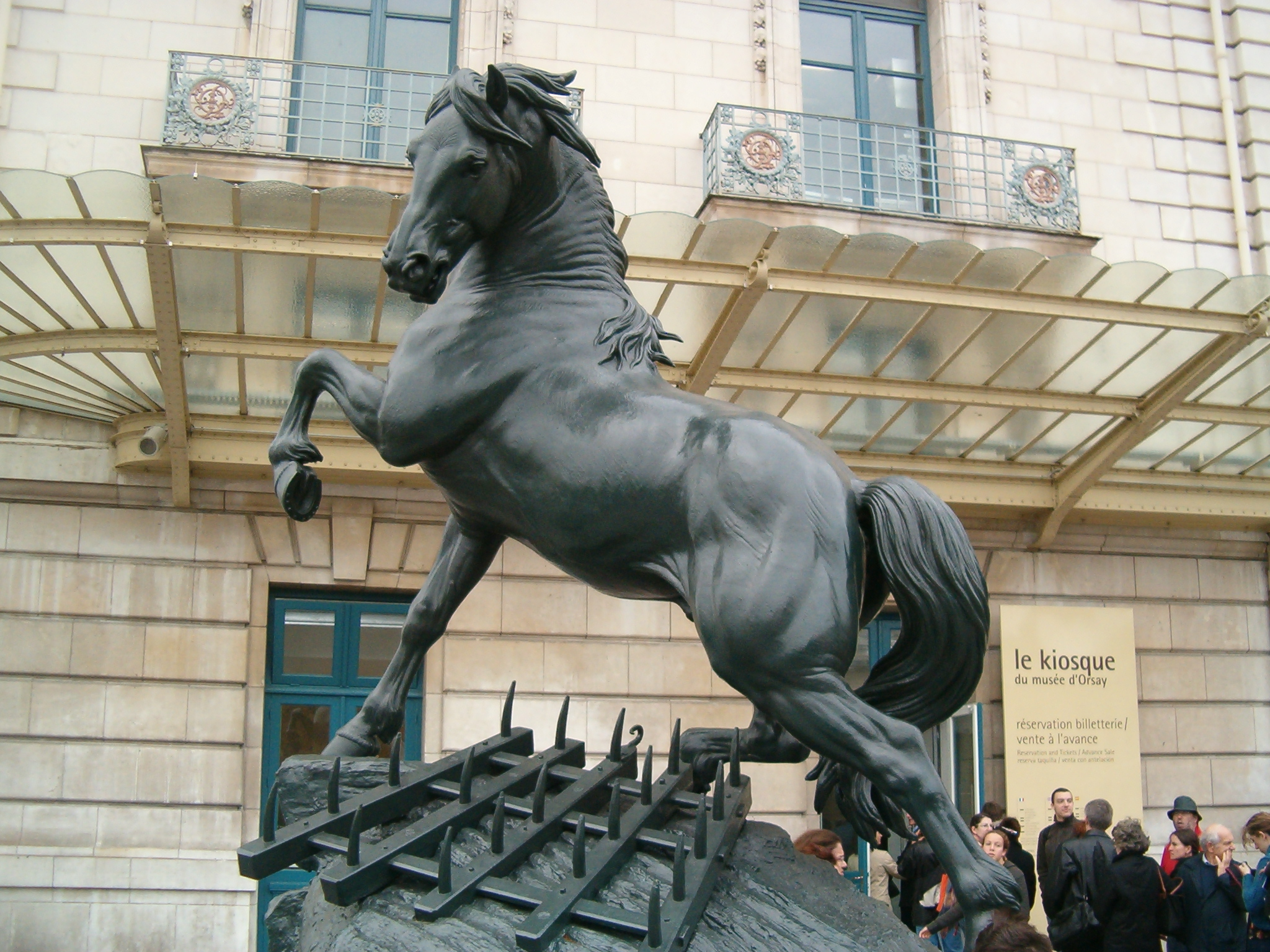
Cheval à la herse by Pierre Louis Rouillard.

== Contemporary perspectives ==
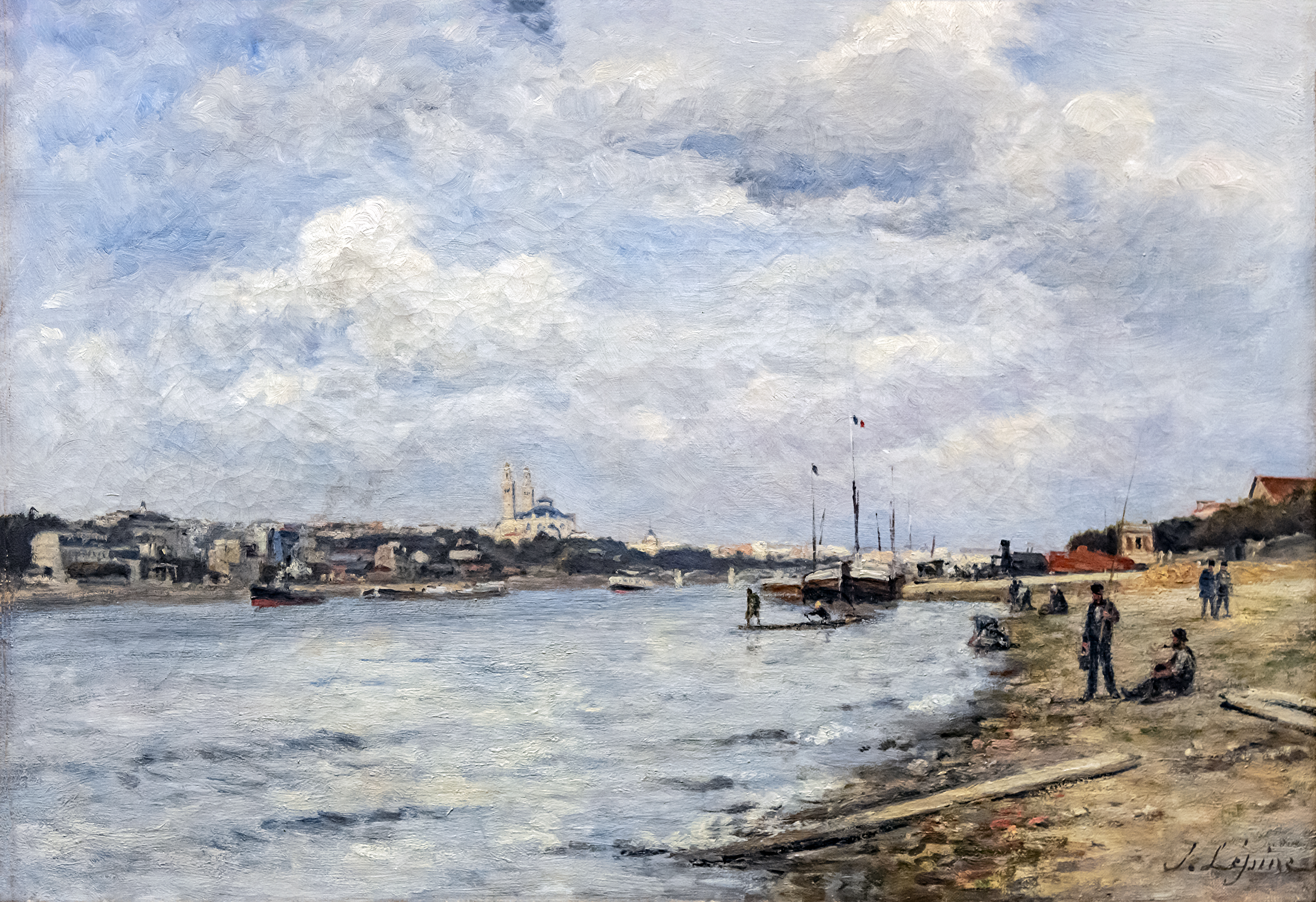
The Seine, Trocadéro and Pont de Grenelle, seen from the Quai de Javel, Stanislas Lépine, 1880-1885, Fondation Bemberg.

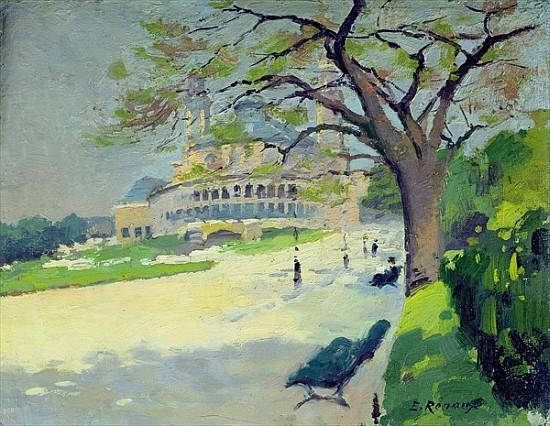
The Trocadéro Palace and its gardens in a painting by Jules Ernest Renoux (date unknown).

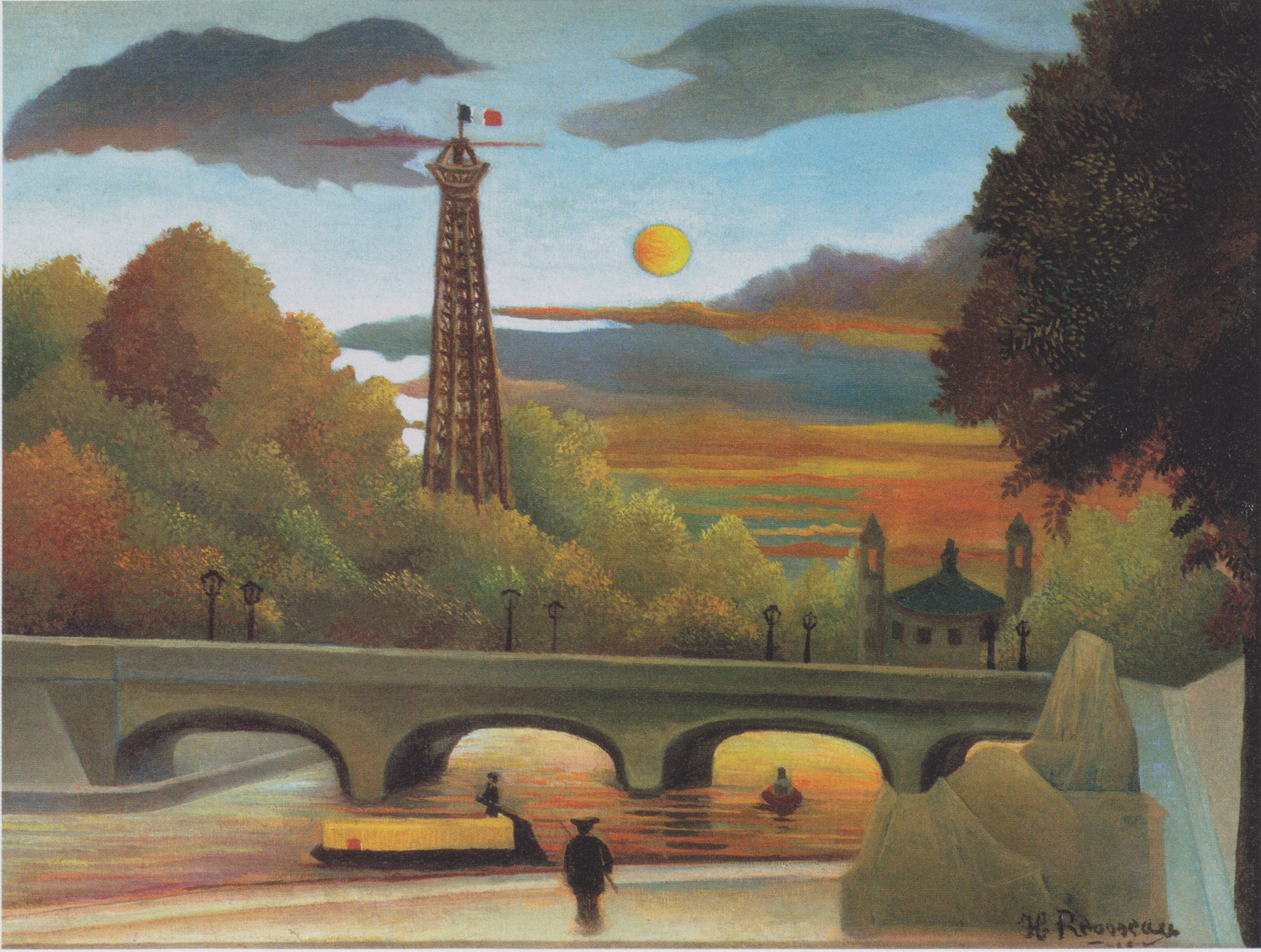
View of the Seine with the Trocadéro Palace in the distance, by painter Henri Rousseau (1910).

Since the construction of the Trocadéro Palace and well afterwards, contemporaries have commented on the building's style, expressing astonishment, indignation or, on the contrary, praise:

- 1878: journalist Gabriel Lafaille expressed his delight in the Journal hebdomadaire of the Exposition Universelle: "Contemporary architecture has found its Pantheon. It's now a given: the nineteenth century has an architecture".
- 1878: a journalist at La Revue de France: "It's Assyrian, or Moorish, or Byzantine, but it's high [...]. This is not the style of any period, although it is the style of all schools. The silhouette [...] with its two minarets resembles a huge dunce's cap with two big ears".
- 1878: palace architect Gabriel Davioud: the towers "bearing at their summit a monumental belvedere, surmounted by a gilded dome, [...] reminiscent of the Giralda and the tower of the Palazzo Vecchio in Florence, [showed] the buildings of the Exposition Universelle in the distance, in and out of Paris; similar to the bell towers that call Christians to temples, the minarets that announce prayer in the East, and the belfries that once assembled citizens in the public square, [these belvederes provoked] the crowd to the spectacle of the peaceful struggle of nations".
- 1878: art critic Charles Blanc: "What substantially redeems the obesity of the palace in the center of the plan is the height of the two towers with which it is flanked. When a man is fat, he seems less so if he is tall".
- 1888: a journalist at Le Temps, from the second floor of the Eiffel Tower, during the Tower's illumination: "The crowd at the Trocadero is immense. [...] The Trocadero stretches out before us, opening its luminous arms, enlarged by the colored girandoles, through which we hear the waterfall flowing with a clear, harmonious sound".
- 1889: In Certains, Joris-Karl Huysmans compared "this incoherent palace [...] to the belly of a hydropic woman lying with her head down, raising in the air two skinny legs shod with gold mule stockings".
- 1927: In La Prisonnière, Marcel Proust wrote: "Why, on a fine day, detach one's eyes from the Trocadero, whose giraffe-necked towers are reminiscent of the Certosa di Pavia?".

== In popular culture ==
The Trocadéro Palace appears in Claude Autant-Lara's films Love Story (1943), Gigi (1949), A Very Long Engagement (2004), The Extraordinary Adventures of Adèle Blanc-Sec (2010), Diary of a Chambermaid (2015), Eiffel (2021), in the video game The Saboteur (2009) and in the animated film Ballerina (2016).

== Appendix ==
=== Bibliography and sources ===
==== Expositions universelles ====
- ^{(fr)} Linda Aimone and Carlo Olmo, Les expositions universelles, 1851-1900, Paris, Belin, 1993;
- ^{(fr)} Isabelle Baguelin, "La céramique: la redécouverte d'un vitrail de l'exposition universelle de 1878 au musée des Monuments français", Histoire de l'art, no 56, April 2005, pp. 131–139;
- ^{(fr)} Bertrand Lemoine (dir.), Paris 1937. Cinquantenaire de l'Exposition internationale des arts et des techniques de la vie moderne, Paris, Institut français d'architecture/Paris-Musées,, 1987;
- ^{(fr)} Pascal Ory, Les Expositions universelles de 1855 à 1939, Paris, Ramsay, 1982;
- ^{(fr)} Gabriel Davioud, architecte, 1824-1881, Paris, Délégation à l'action artistique de la Ville de Paris, 1981.

==== Trocadéro ====
- ^{(fr)} Isabelle Gournay, Le nouveau Trocadéro, Liège/Bruxelles, Mardaga/IFA, 1985, 240 p. (ISBN 2-87009-211-3);
- ^{(fr)} Jacques Hillairet, Dictionnaire historique des rues de Paris, t. 2, éditions de Minuit, 1985, 1583 p. (ISBN 2-7073-1054-9), p. 574;
- ^{(fr)} Kéléren, "Des lapins de Garenne aux soldats des Bourbons (Les singuliers avatars de la Colline de Chaillot)", article published on page 15 of the weekly Jeunesse-Magazine no. 27, 4 July 1937, illustrated with a drawing by Pellos;
- ^{(fr)} Frédéric Seitz, Le Trocadéro: les métamorphoses d'une colline de Paris, Paris, Belin, 2005;
- Ory, Pascal (2006). "Le palais de Chaillot". Cité de l'architecture et du patrimoine / Aristéas / Actes Sud. Les grands témoins de l'architecture.
- ^{(fr)} Esprit(s) des lieux: Du Trocadéro au palais de Chaillot, Paris, Cité de l'architecture et du patrimoine and Archives nationales, 2011, 140 p. (ISBN 978-2-86000-351-3).

== See also ==
- Palais de Chaillot
- Jardins du Trocadéro | Fontaine du Trocadéro
- Rue de Lille (Paris)
