= Anaïs de Bassanville =

French writer and journalist (1802–1884)

Thérèse Anaïs Rigo , better known by her pseudonyms Anaïs de Bassanville and Comtesse de Bassanville, was a 19th-century French writer and women's magazine journalist. She authored numerous works about good manners. She was born in 1802 in Auteuil, Seine (now Paris) and died on 6 November 1884 in the same town.

== Biography ==
Eldest daughter of Michel Rigo and Louise Thérèse Christine Modeste Jaubert, she was a pupil of Henriette Campan. She was the elder of two brothers: Jules Alfred Vincent Rigo born in 1810 and Augustin Maximilien Édouard Rigo born in 1813. She was a well-born daughter, with close ties to the imperial court, where her father was a member of the Institut (Institut de France), reporting to Empress Josephine. Her mother was one of the ladies accompanying the empress. Anaïs de Bassanville began writing at the age of 40. She took the pen name Comtesse de Bassanville and founded the Journal des jeunes filles. She edited Le moniteur des dames et des demoiselles from 1846 to 1850 and Le dimanche des familles from 1856 to 1858.

She made a name for herself in 1847 with Le Perfectionnement de l'éducation des filles. In 1867, she published Code du cérémonial: Guide des gens du monde dans toutes les circonstances de la vie. This work presents the rules of good society Etiquette. Initially criticized and vilified, the book met with success and was reprinted several times.

Having lived through the end of the Napoleon III regime, the Restoration and the July Monarchy, a period of great change in mentalities and mores, she published Les Salons d'autrefois sous le régime de Napoleon III. This work recalls the literary, philosophical and discussion Salon (gathering) of the Ancien Régime, intended for literate men and women, bourgeois or noble, with a passion for letters, theater, poetry and science. We can even think of her pen name: the title comtesse recalls the great ladies of the Society in the Ancien Régime.

In 1822, Anaïs Rigo married Louis Frédéric Auguste Le Brun, an officer in the royal guard, more precisely as archchancellor. Their son Paul Louis also embarked on a military career.

Owner of a small hotel on the banks of the Canal Saint-Martin, she was placed in the Sainte-Périne d'Auteuil asylum following paralysis of the legs. Almost in her eighties, she was still young at heart, according to Jules Arsène Arnaud Claretie, a chronicler whom she invited to visit her in her room.

She died at the age of 82, on November 6, 1884. Her funeral took place on November 11, 1884 at the Notre-Dame d'Auteuil church, and she is buried in the Père Lachaise Cemetery(1st division).

== History ==
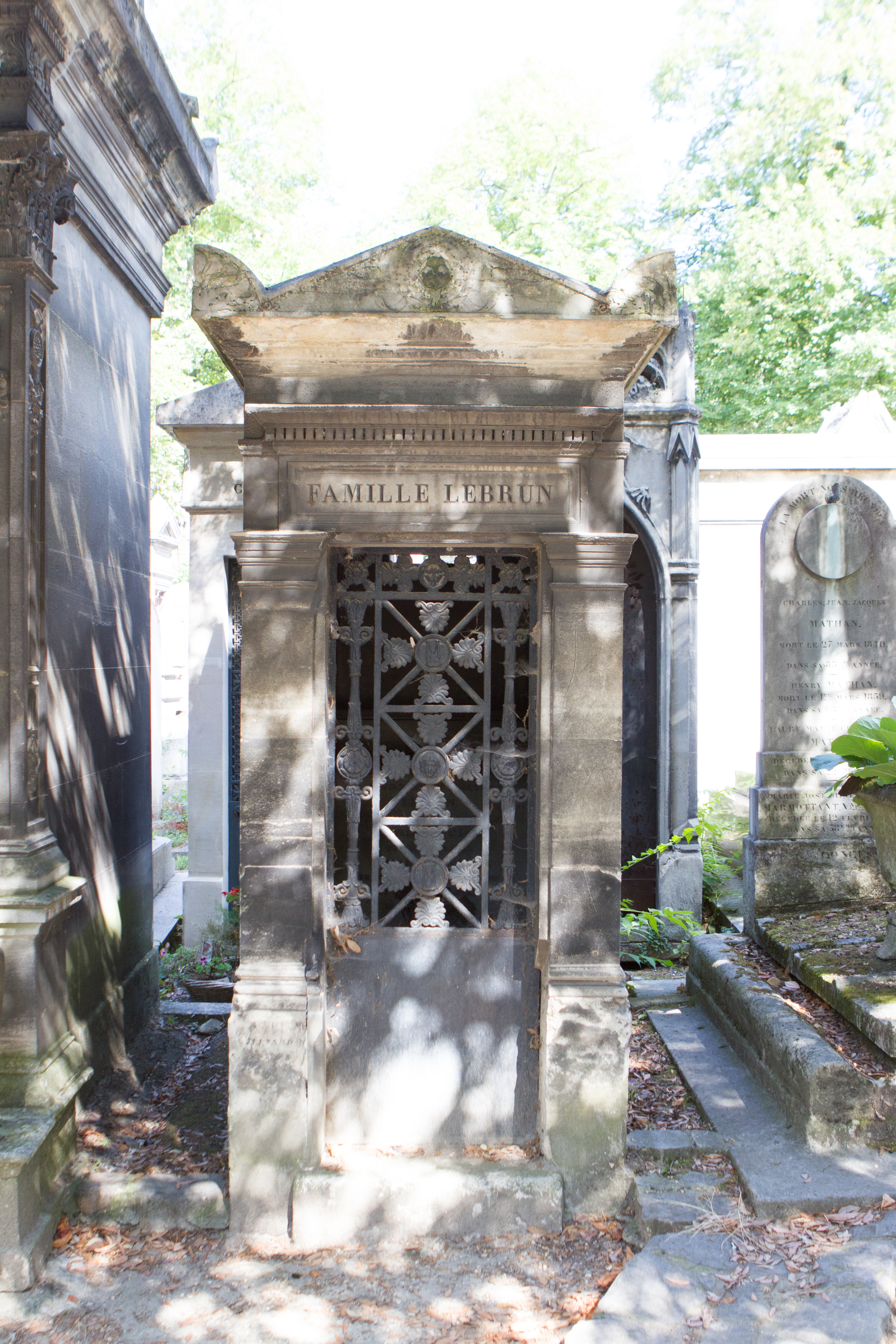
The tomb of Comtesse de Bassanville at Père Lachaise Cemetery, Paris.

She was the disciple of Henriette Campan. She started writing at the age of 40 under the pseudonym Comtesse de Bassanville (Countess of Bassanville). She founded the Journal des jeunes filles. Moreover, she was the direction of Le moniteur des dames et des demoiselles from 1986 to 1850 and of Le dimanche des familles from 1856 to 1858.

In 1867, she released her book Code du cérémonial : Guide des gens du monde dans toutes les circonstances de la vie that explained the rule of good manners. The book faced negative criticism at first, but became successful and was re-published several times.

Bassanville died in November 1884 in Auteuil, Seine and was buried at Père Lachaise Cemetery (1st division).

== Published works ==
- Les aventures d'une épingle ou Trois siècles de l'histoire de France, 267 p., Paris, Aubert, 1846
- La corbeille de fleurs, 1848
- Les mémoires d'une jeune fille, 1849
- Le monde tel qu'il est, 1853
- Les primeurs de la vie, 1854
- Délassements de l'enfance, 1856
- Les épis d'une glaneuse, 1858
- les Deux familles, 1859
- Les salons d'autrefois, souvenirs intimes, 4 vol. in-18, Paris, P. Brunet,
- De l'éducation des femmes, 1861
- Les Contes du bonhomme jadis, 1861
- L'entrée dans le monde, 1862
- Les Secrets d'une jeune fille, 1863
- Les Ouvriers illustres, 1863
- Code du cérémonial : Guide des gens du monde dans toutes les circonstances de la vie,
- Beauté et bonté; La Folle du logis, 126 p., Paris, A. Hatier, 1902

== External link ==
- Works by Comtesse de Bassanville at Gallica
