= Waiters' race =

Type of novelty foot race

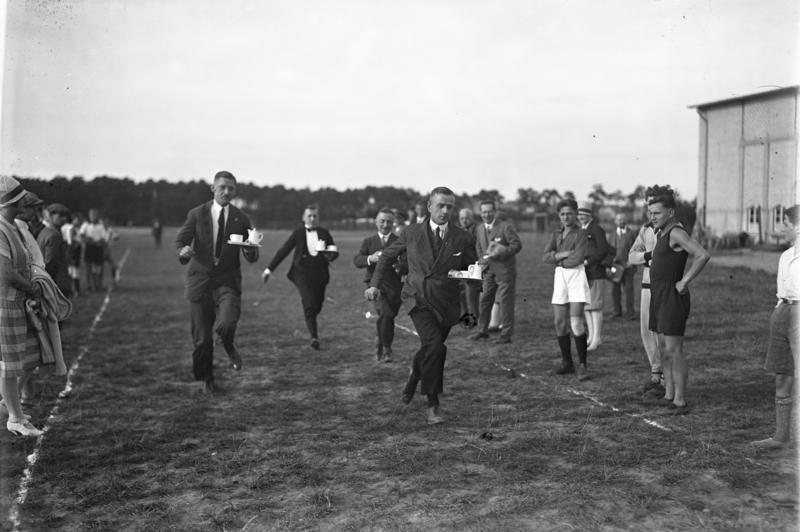
100m German waiters' race in Berlin, September 1930

A waiters' race is a type of race that tests the speed that a waiter can carry a tray loaded with items such as coffee, water and croissants without tipping it. They are largely prevalent in France and held in Paris as the Course des Cafés, but have also been held worldwide, mainly by French diaspora on Bastille Day, with other adaptations involving localised items such as beer.

== History ==
=== France ===
Though the exact details of the first waiters' races are dubious, they were first organized to bring recognition to the waiter profession in Paris. The race's initial name was the Course des Garçons de Café, with competitors being almost exclusively male.

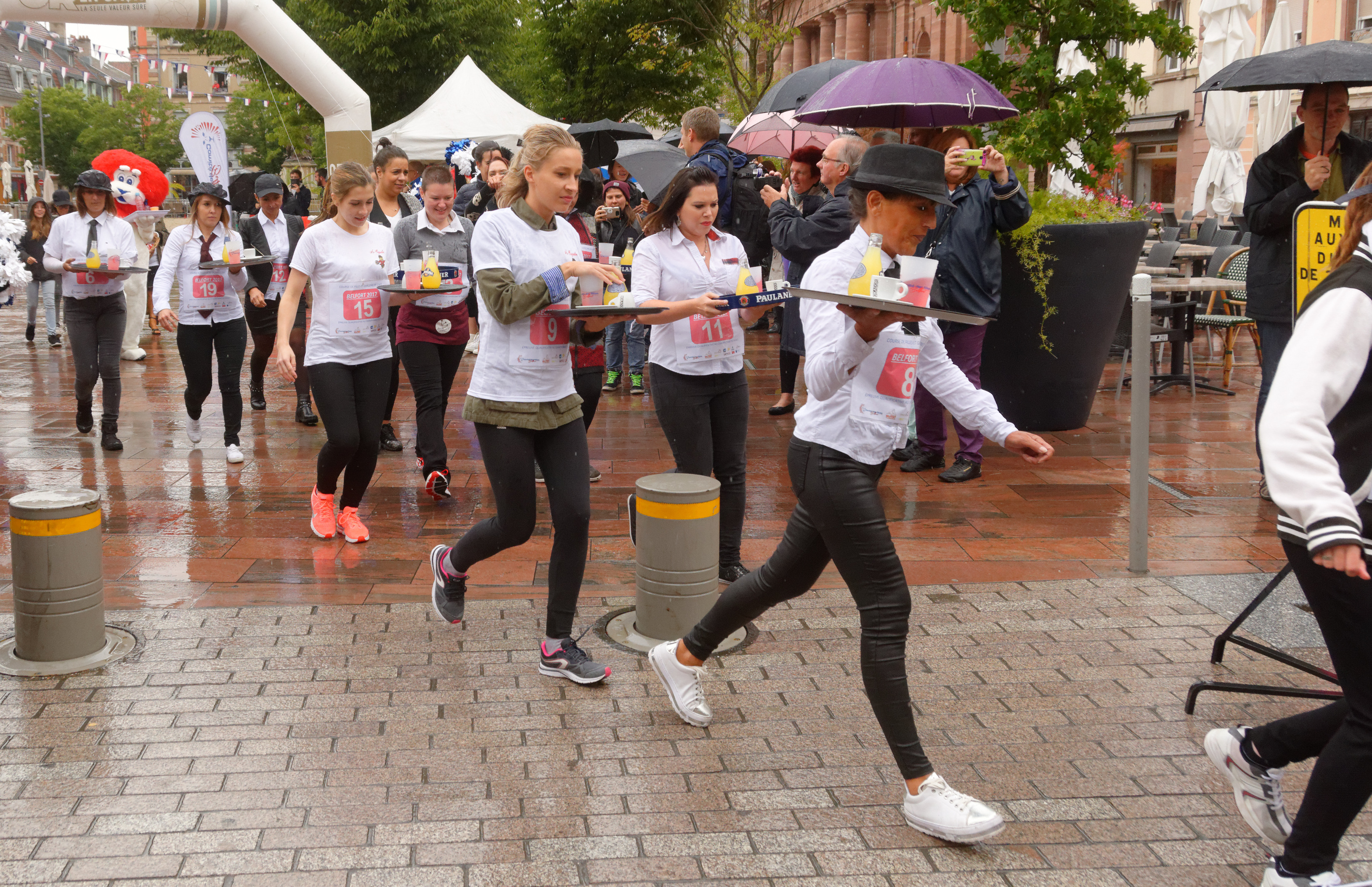
Waiters' Race in Belfort, September 2017

A lack of sponsors and thus budget constraints led to the race ceasing to operate in Paris after its 2011 event, though other such races were held in Marseille, Trouville, Limoges and other towns and cities in the country afterward.

The race made a return to Paris with the shortened name of Course des Cafés in 2024 due to Eau de Paris, the city's water authority, contributing €100,000 for trays, aprons, coffee, and croissants. Held on 24 March, it was intended to promote the "excellence of French service" as part of Paris' intangible cultural heritage, as well as to raise awareness of a lack of staff in the city's hotel-restaurant sector. The race was open to professionals, apprentices and part-time trainee servers, and began on the square in front of the Hôtel de Ville, the same starting point as the marathon in the then upcoming 2024 Summer Olympics. Over 200 waiters carried their trays holding a typical French breakfast of a croissant, coffee, and a glass of water for 2 kilometres (1.2 mi) around the Marais district in the city. Apprentices raced separately from long-time waiters, while men and women raced together but were awarded separately. At the end of the race, trays were inspected and time penalties were awarded for inaccuracies such as spilled water below a 10-centimeter line inflicting a 30-second penalty. Prizes were given to the top three contestants in each category, including a stay at a four-star hotel. Tickets to the Olympic Games opening ceremony were given to all first-place finishers in their categories; the men's race was won by Samy Lamrous with a time of 13:30 and the women's race by Pauline Van Wymeersch with a time of 14:12.

=== Worldwide ===
The events often remain associated with French culture, with organizers scheduling some races on Bastille Day. Events like this have taken place in the United States; Washington, D.C. operated the Bastille Race for Waiters and Waitresses from 1974 until at least 2006 in which contestants carried a litre of bottled water and a filled drinking glass on their trays, and Brasserie Les Halles in New York City had a similar race with bottles and glasses of Champagne instead of water. New Orleans also had a similar race.

In the United Kingdom, the Soho Waiters Race in London, run by The Soho Society, has dated back to the 1950s, likely inspired by the French races due to Soho being a centre of French cooking in the city since the 19th century. Items that must be held on trays are a napkin, half a bottle of Prosecco (formerly Champagne), and a glass. Around 50 people competed in its 2024 race with a first place prize of £100. Other towns in the UK have adopted the race by switching out the coffee and croissant for pints of beer.

Variations have also taken place in Hong Kong and Yokohama.
