= Pavillon de l'eau =

Museum in Paris, France

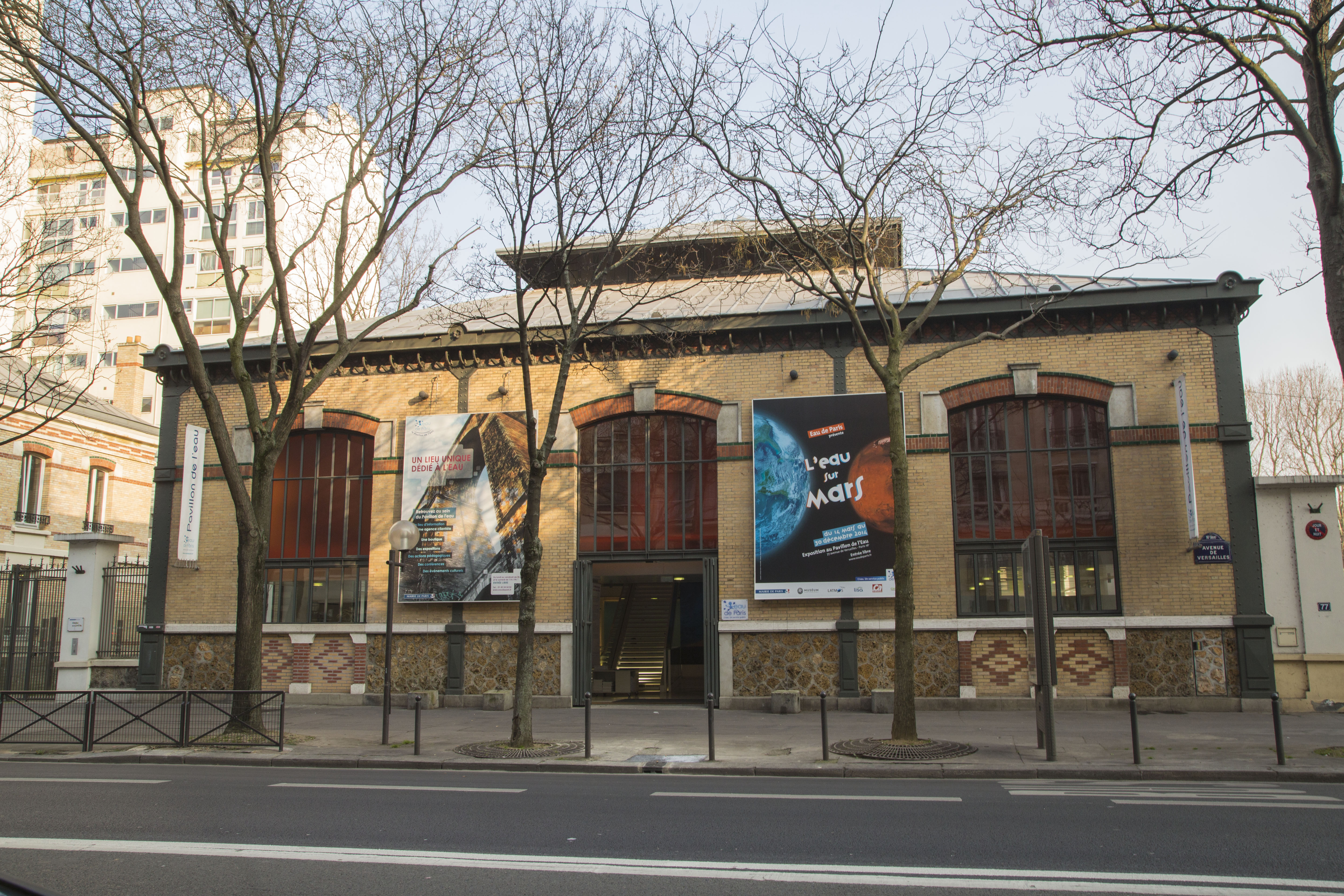

- Location within Paris
- Established: 2007
- Location: 77, avenue de Versailles; 75016 Paris, France
- Coordinates: 48.846375°N 2.273076°E
- Visitors: 39 000 (2014)
- Public transit access: Mirabeau; Javel
- Website: www.eaudeparis.fr/lespace-culture/pavillon-de-leau

The Pavillon de l'eau (French pronunciation: [pavijɔ̃ də lo]) is a museum devoted to water belonging to the City of Paris and managed by Eau de Paris, the municipal agency in charge of production and distribution of water in Paris. The Pavillon de l’eau offers a permanent exhibition about the water supply history of the city, temporary exhibitions, children's activities (educational workshops, screenings, performances etc.) and thematic meetings.

The Water Pavilion, i.e. factory A, as well as factory B and its metal staircase, have been listed as historical monuments since January 30, 2020.

== History ==
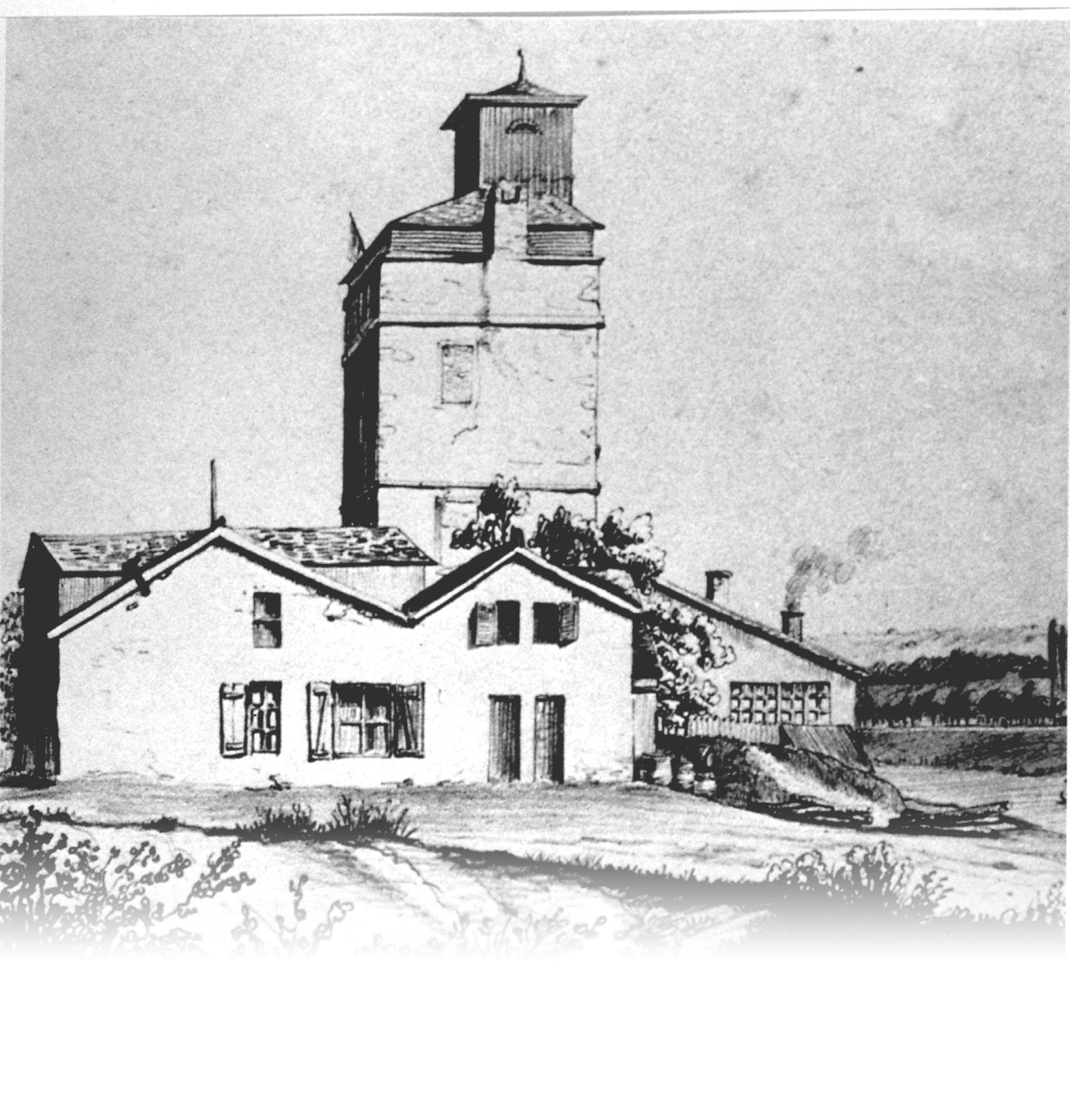
The steam pump in 1828

In 1828, on the ancient road to Versailles, a steam pump was installed in order to pump water from the Seine to supply the municipalities of Auteuil and Passy.

By the end of the nineteenth century, the old steam pumps were obsolete. Consequently, the City Council of Paris voted the construction of a new pumping station to replace the previous one with newer technology. The station (named station A) consisted of two buildings, the engine room and boiler room, both characterized by a brick structure and large roofs topped by skylights to allow sufficient ventilation and lighting.

However, the new pumping station became outdated, especially regarding its coal consumption. So at the end of the First World War a new project was launched to attach a new pump to the previous one, referred to as station B, which was electrically powered. In 1955, station A was dismantled and the engine room became primarily used as a garage, and then as an office for administrative services until 2007, when the Pavillon de l'eau was inaugurated.

== Permanent exhibition ==
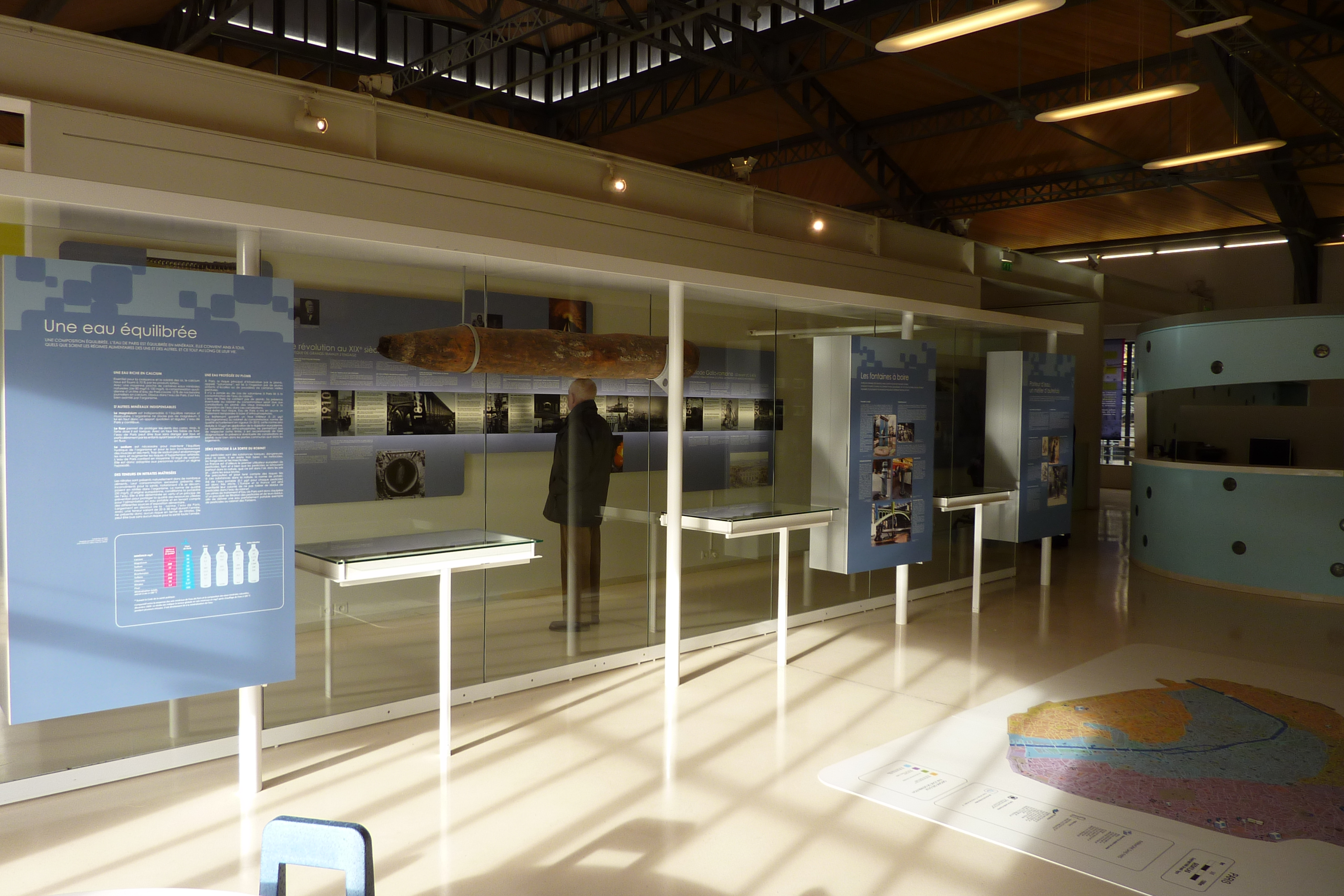
Permanent exhibition

Alimenter Paris en eau is an exhibition about the water supply of Paris and its history from Roman aqueducts to nowadays.

Paris was born and grew up with water. Since the beginning of our times, when Paris was still called Lutetia, the city has experienced four different periods of production and distribution of water. The Roman age, the Middle Ages, the Modern era and the nineteenth century Industrial Revolution.

== Temporary exhibitions gallery ==
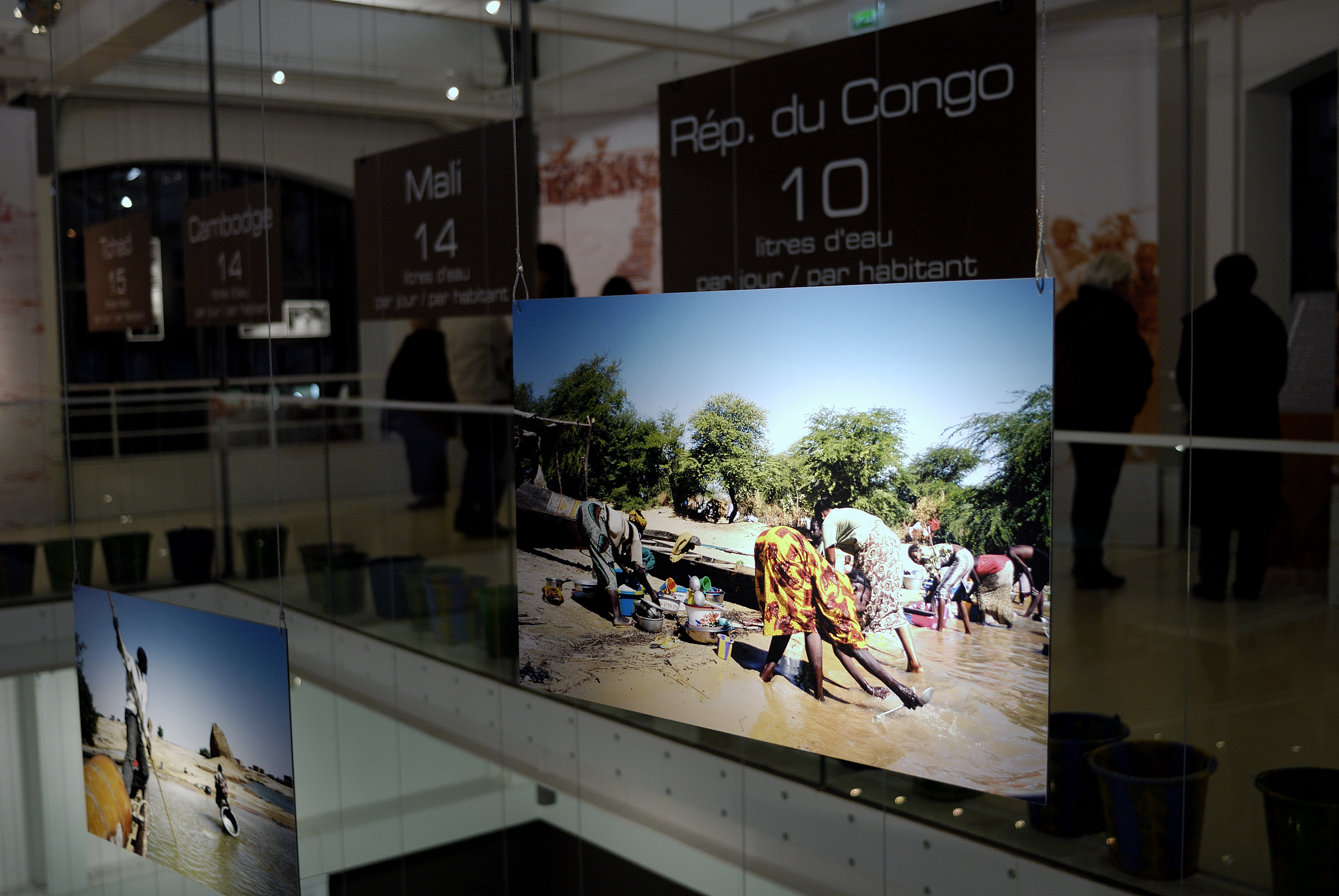

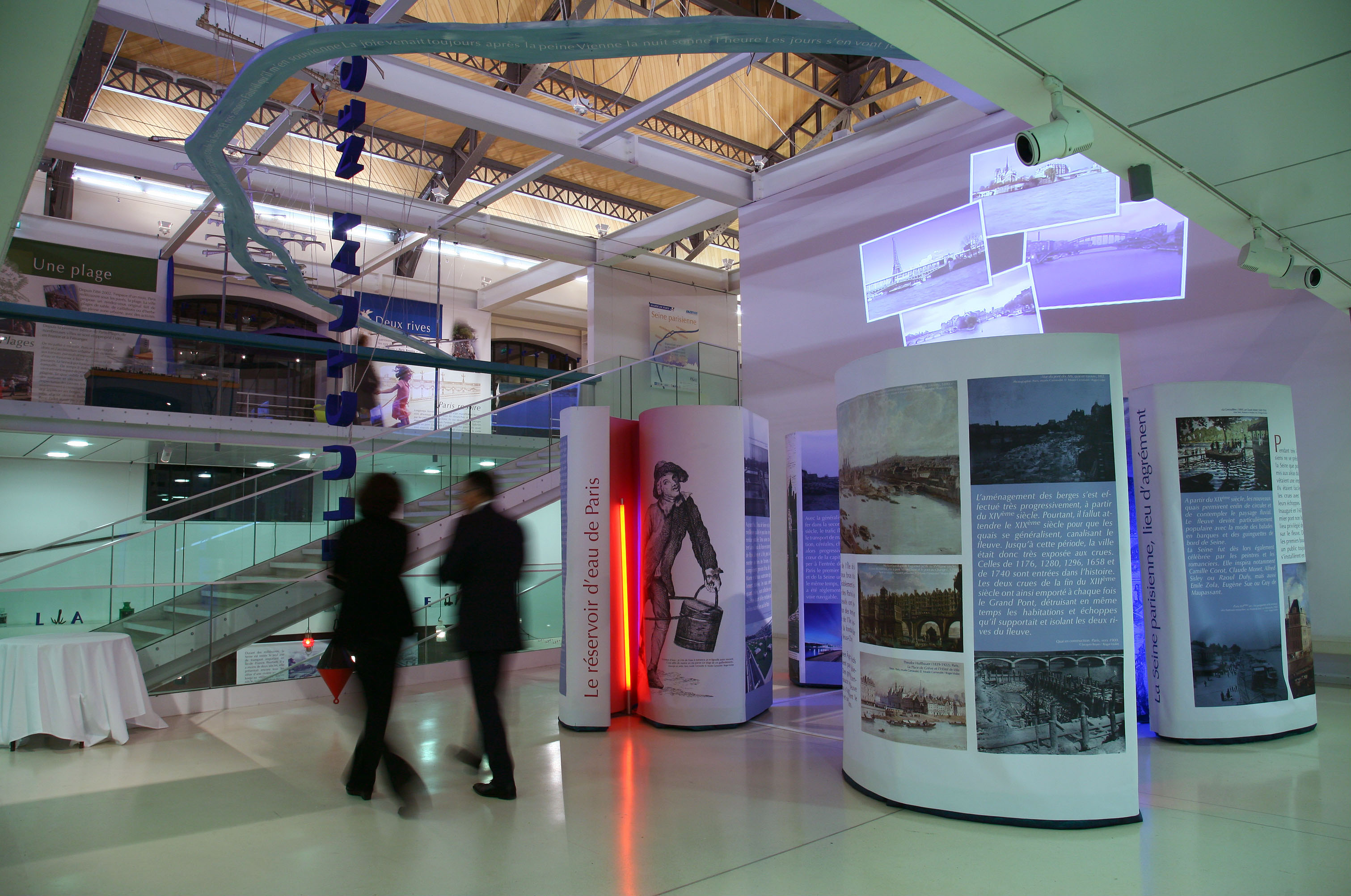

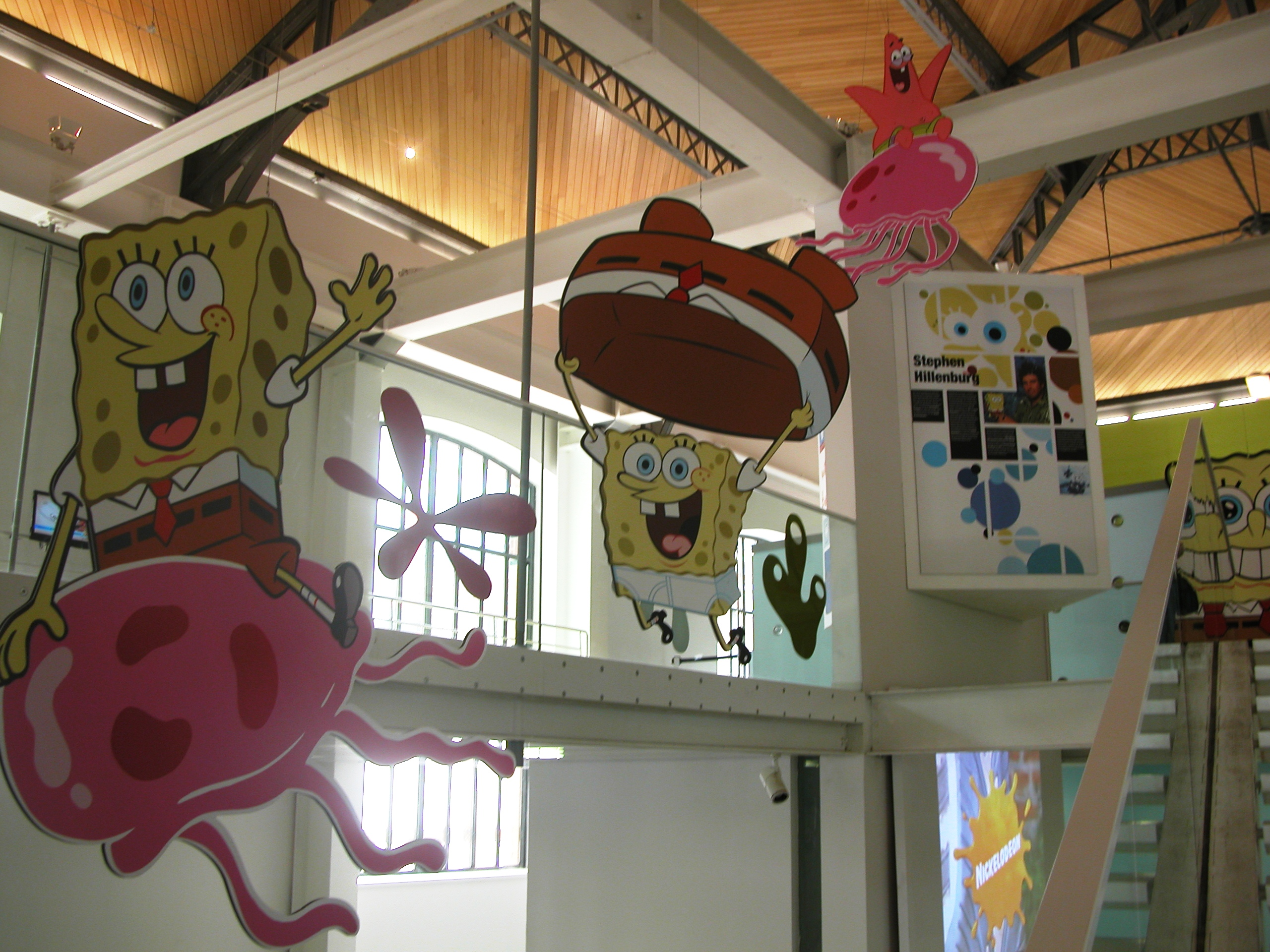

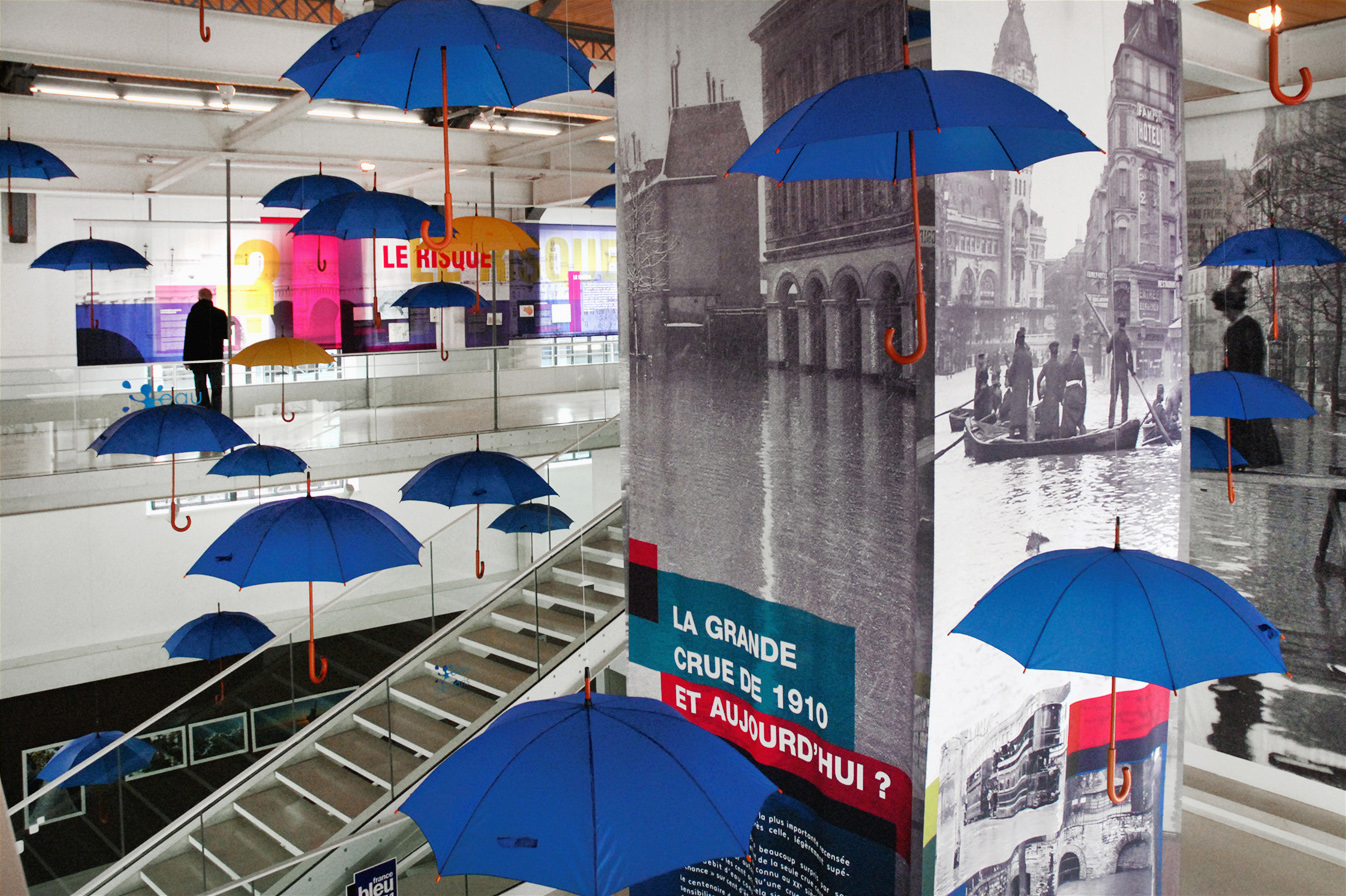

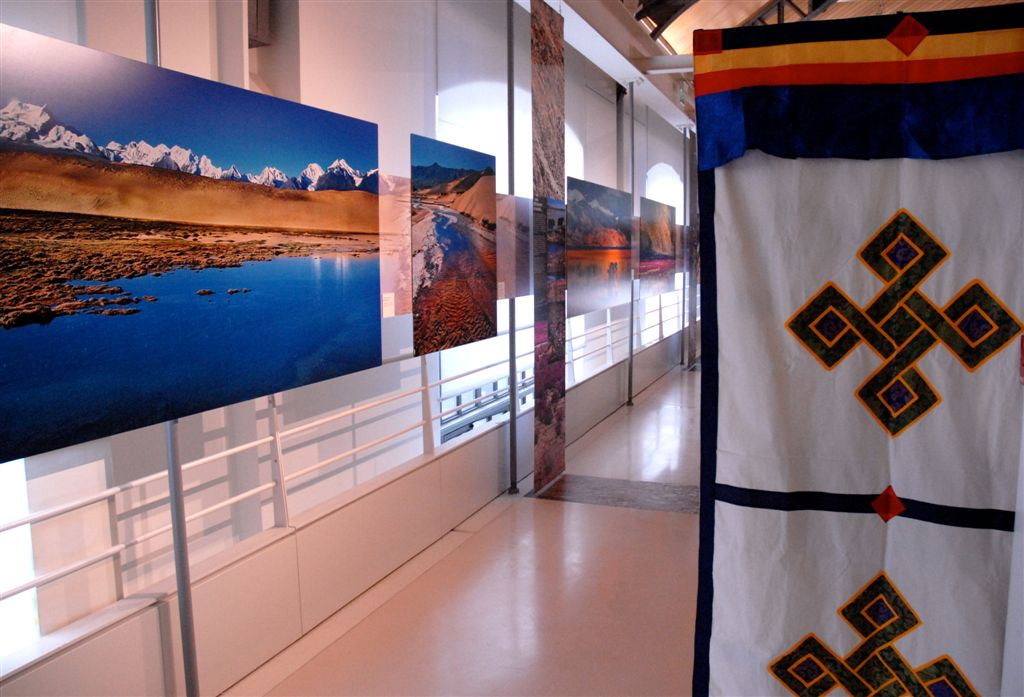

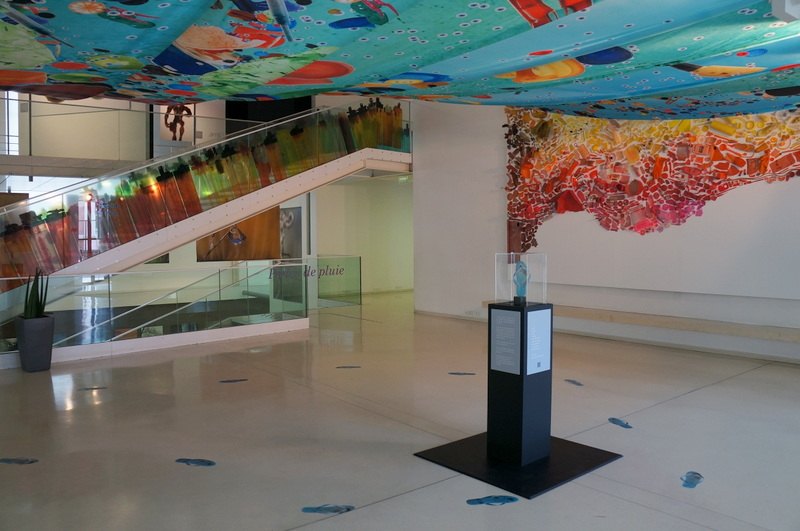

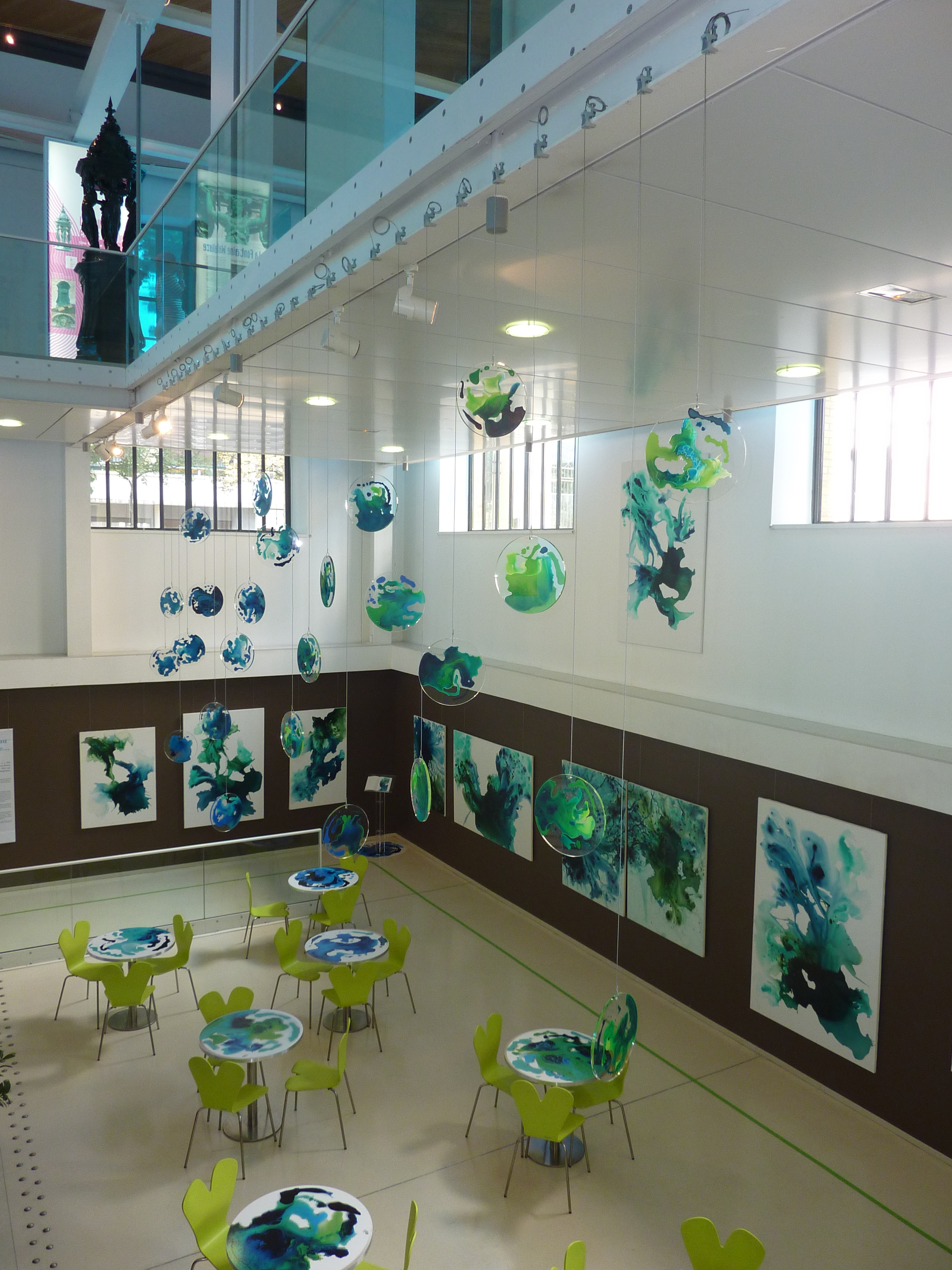

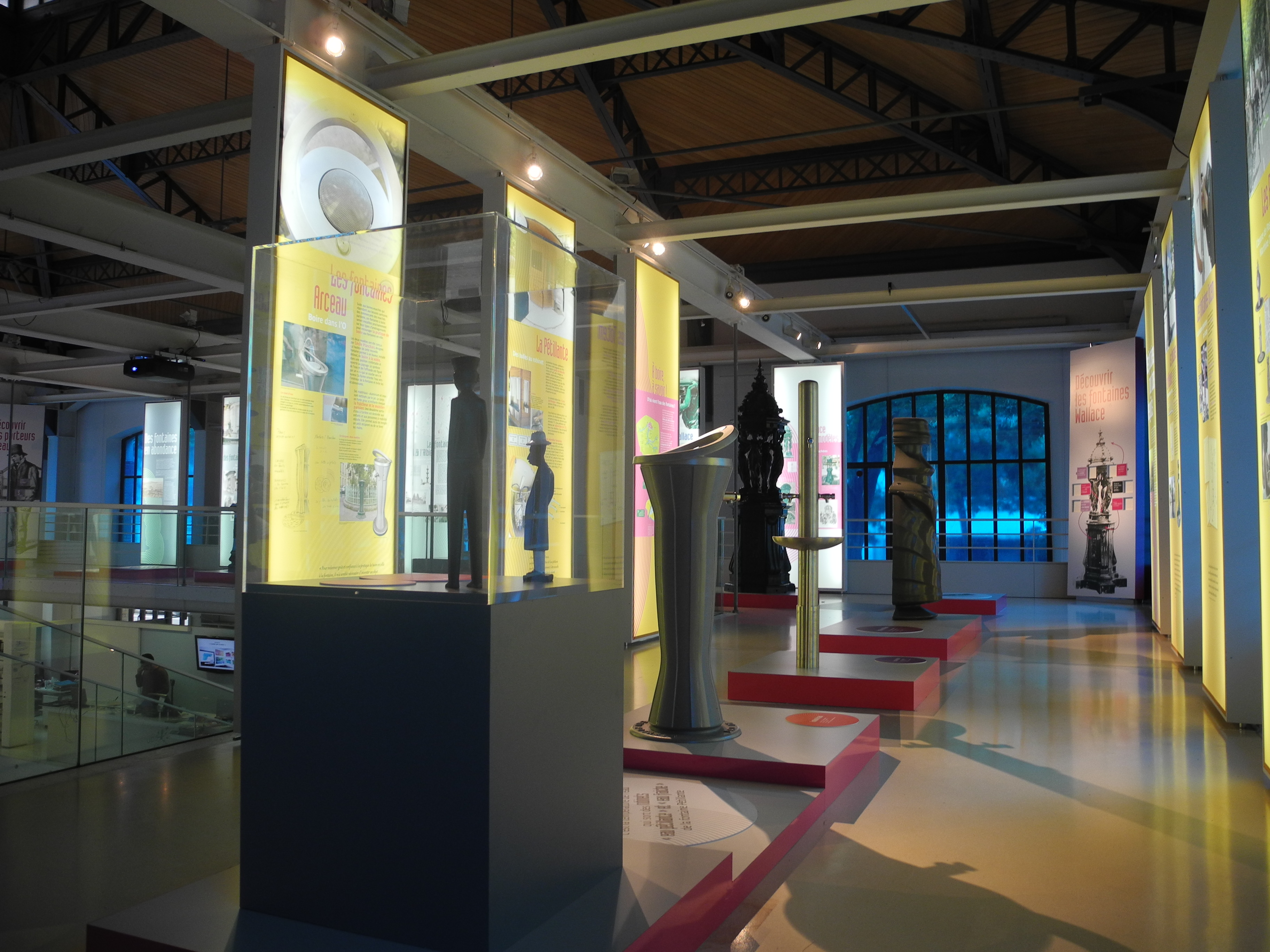

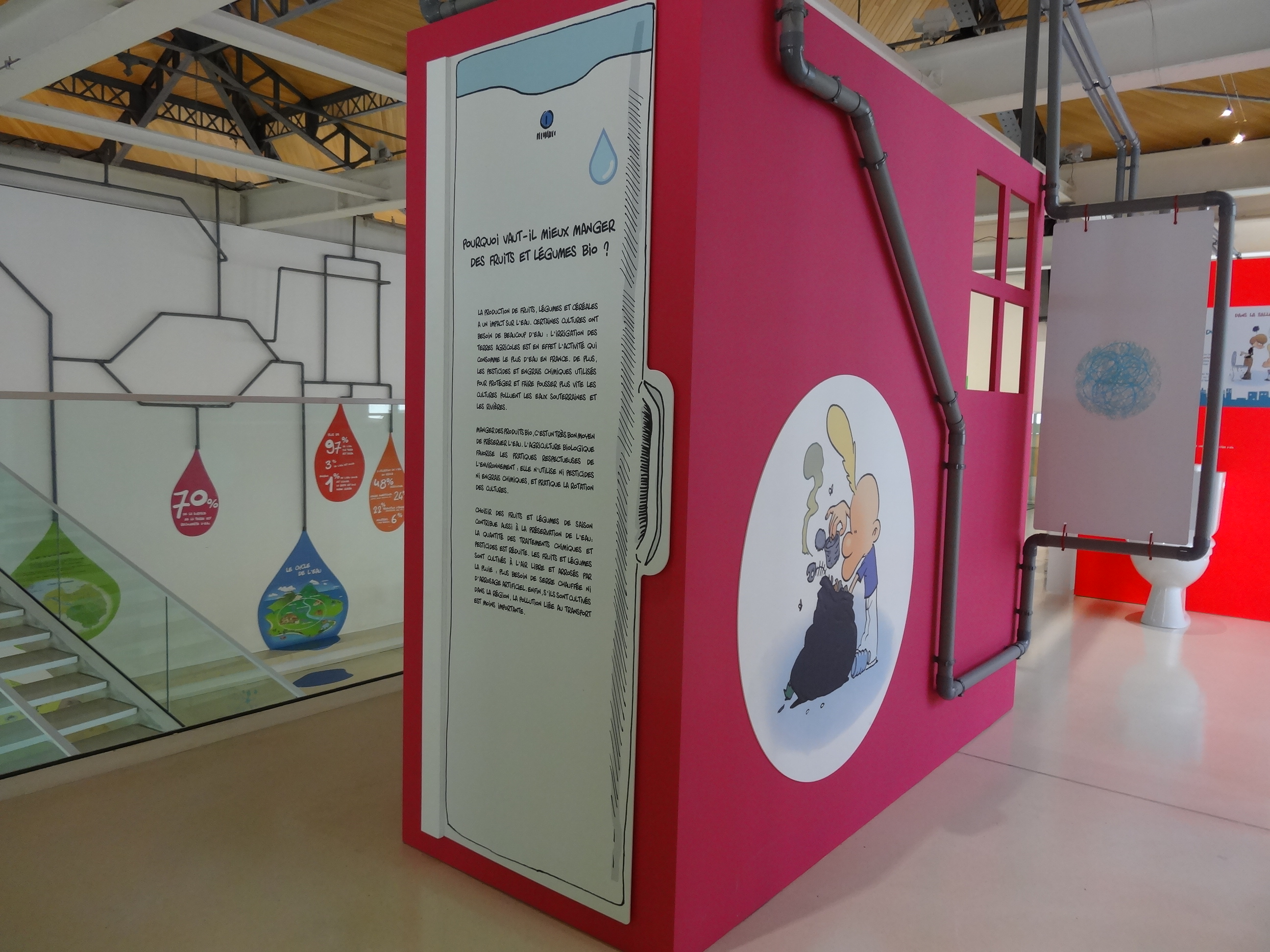

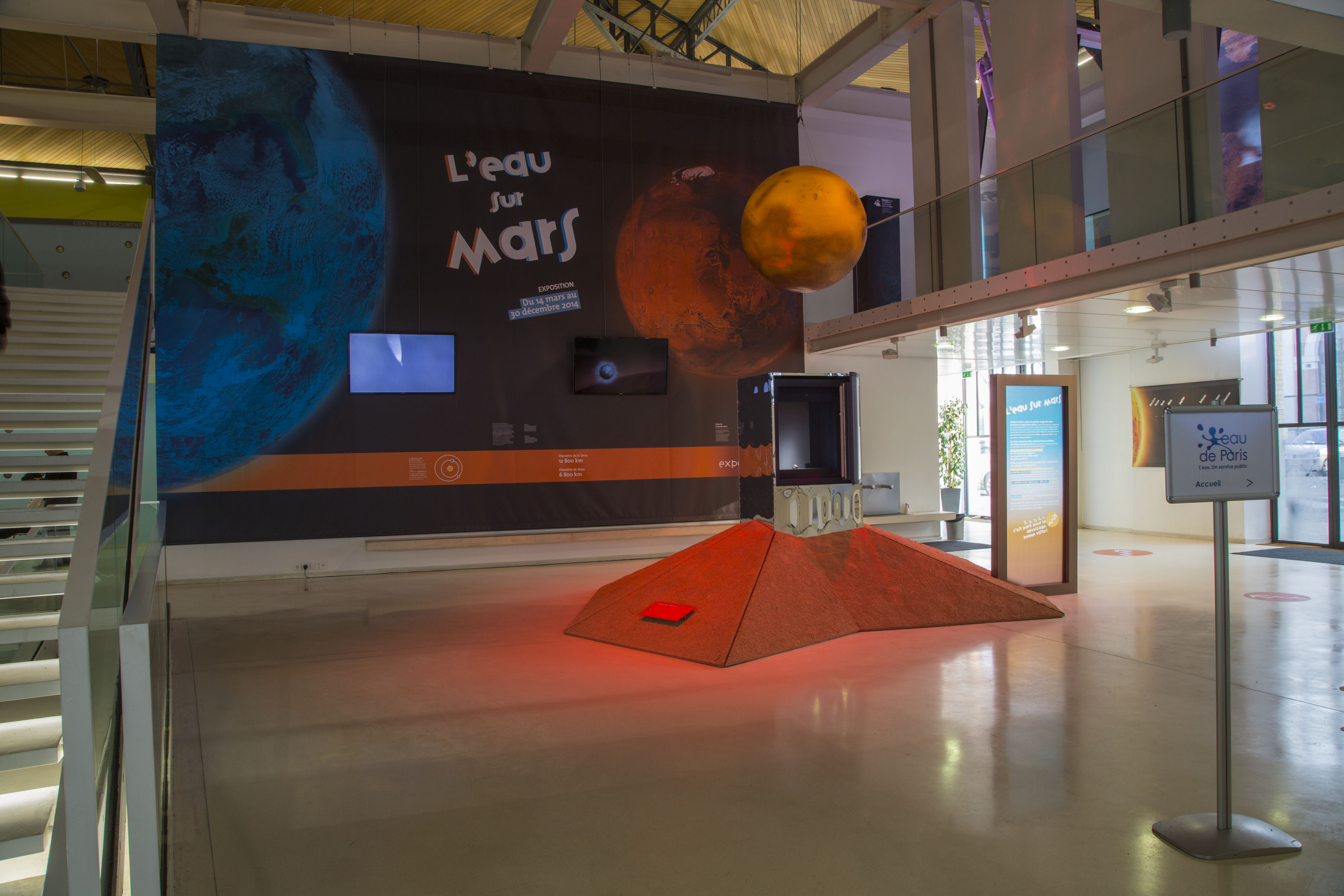

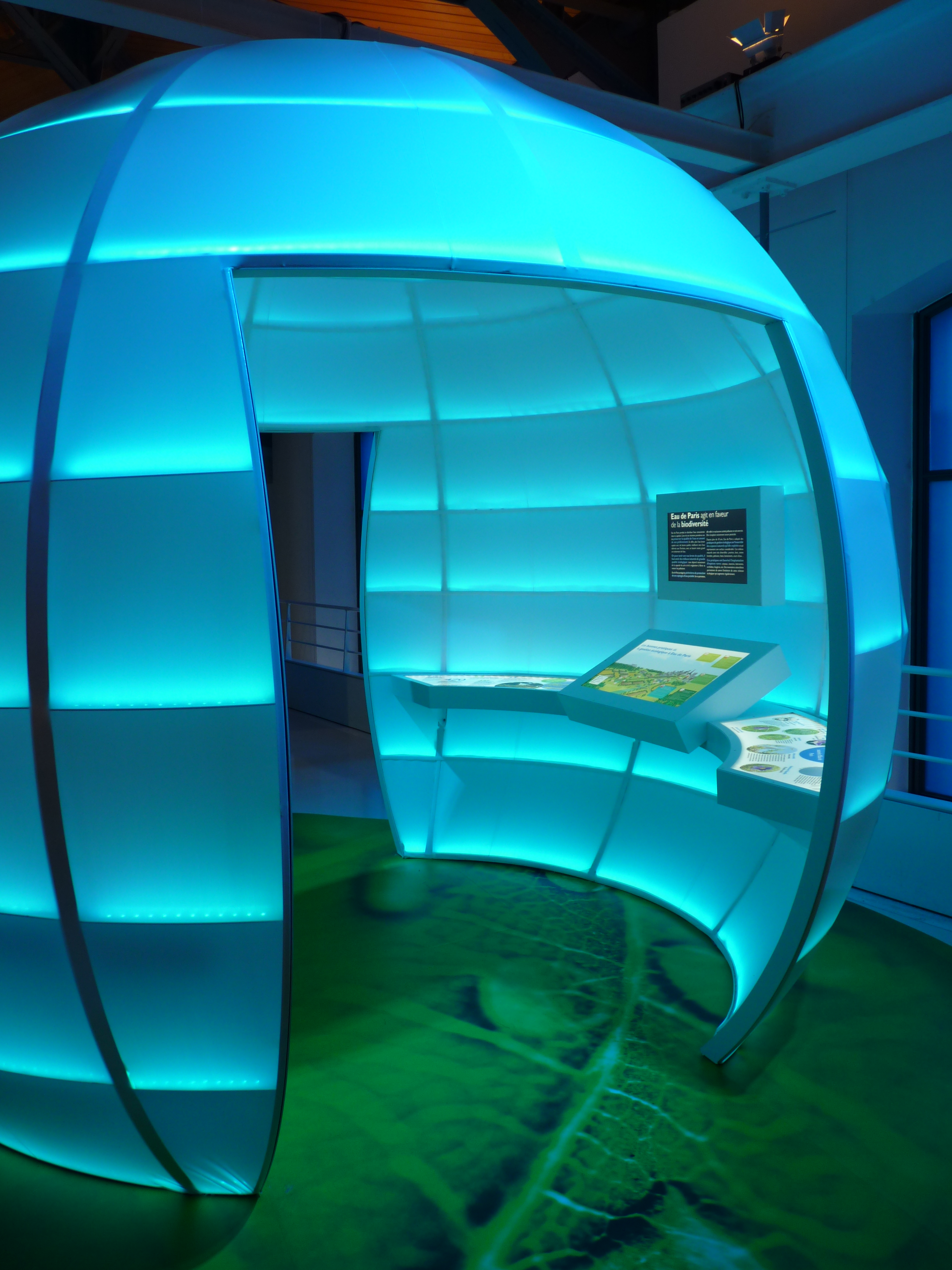
