= Auteuil, Paris =

Administrative quarter of Paris

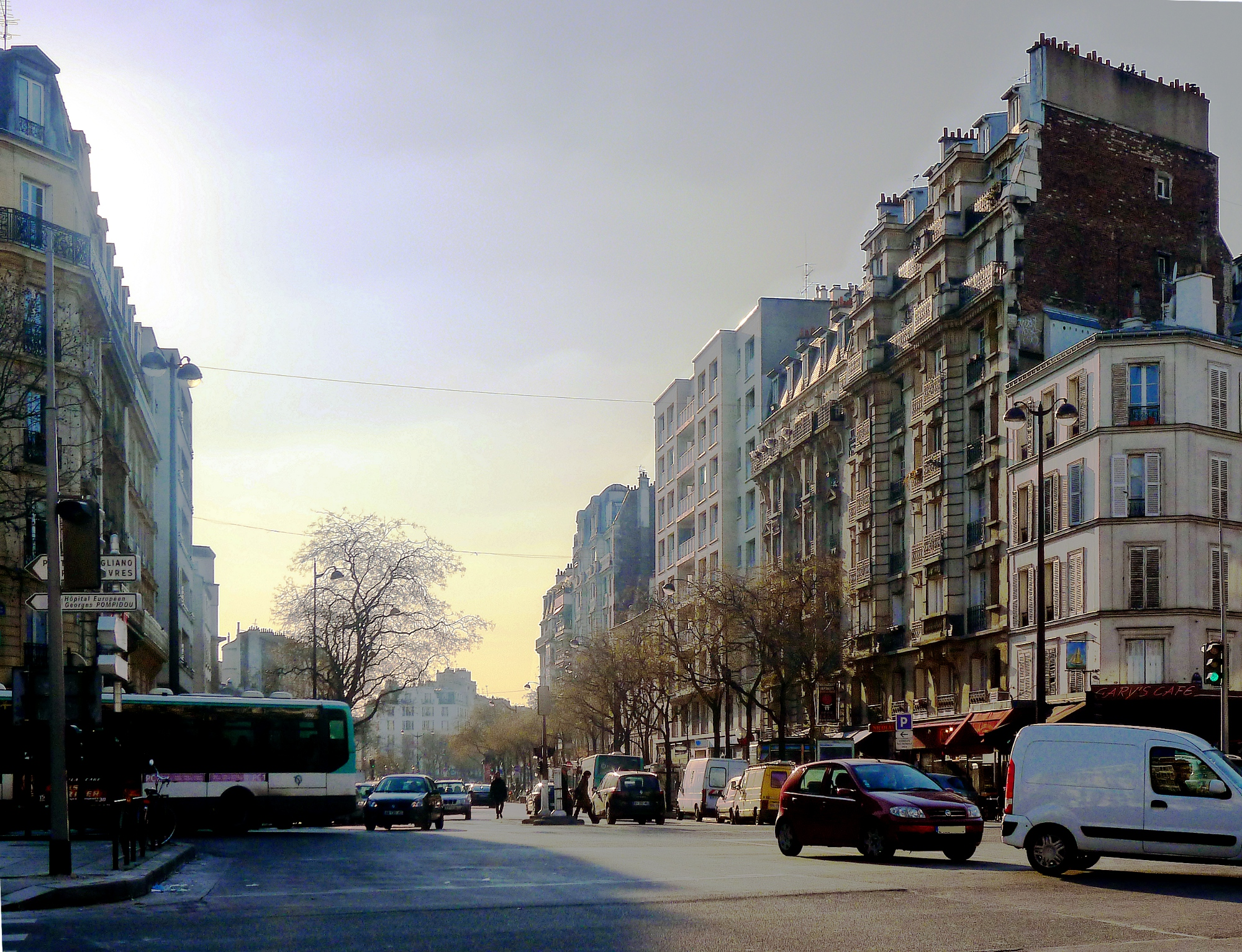
The Avenue de Versailles at Auteuil

Location of Auteuil in the 16th arrondissement of Paris

Auteuil (French pronunciation: [otœj]) is the 61st and westernmost quarter of Paris, France, located in the 16th arrondissement, on the Right Bank. It is adjacent to Passy to the northeast (administratively part of la Muette), Boulogne-Billancourt to the southwest, and the Bois de Boulogne to the northwest. A very discreet neighborhood, it is known for its mainly Catholic and old-money heritage population.

== Toponymy ==
The origin of the name "Auteuil" comes from "Attolium" which derives from the Latin altus, meaning "high".

== History ==
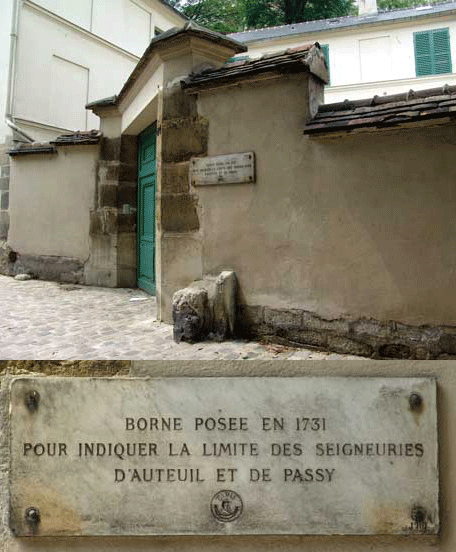
Landmark set between the domains of the Lord of Auteuil and the Lord of Passy in 1731

Auteuil was originally a hamlet named Attolium on the outskirts of Paris, built between the thirteenth and seventeenth centuries; it became a fashionable country retreat for French elites during the reign of Louis XV. Passy was dependent on the parish of Auteuil until 1761. After the French Revolution, Auteuil became a commune of Seine. It was absorbed into Paris along with several other communities in 1860.

Auteuil was incorporated into the city of Paris in 1859–60 by the Law of 16 June 1859. At that time, it was planned that Auteuil and Passy would form a new arrondissement that would be numbered the 13th arrondissement, but "The rich and powerful moving in did not like the number. They pulled strings and became the 16th, the unlucky association and postmark being transferred to the blameless but less influential folks around Porte d'Italie."

== Landmarks ==
Among the landmarks of Auteuil are Notre-Dame d'Auteuil, the Jardin des Serres d'Auteuil, the Pavillon de l'eau, and Maison La Roche.

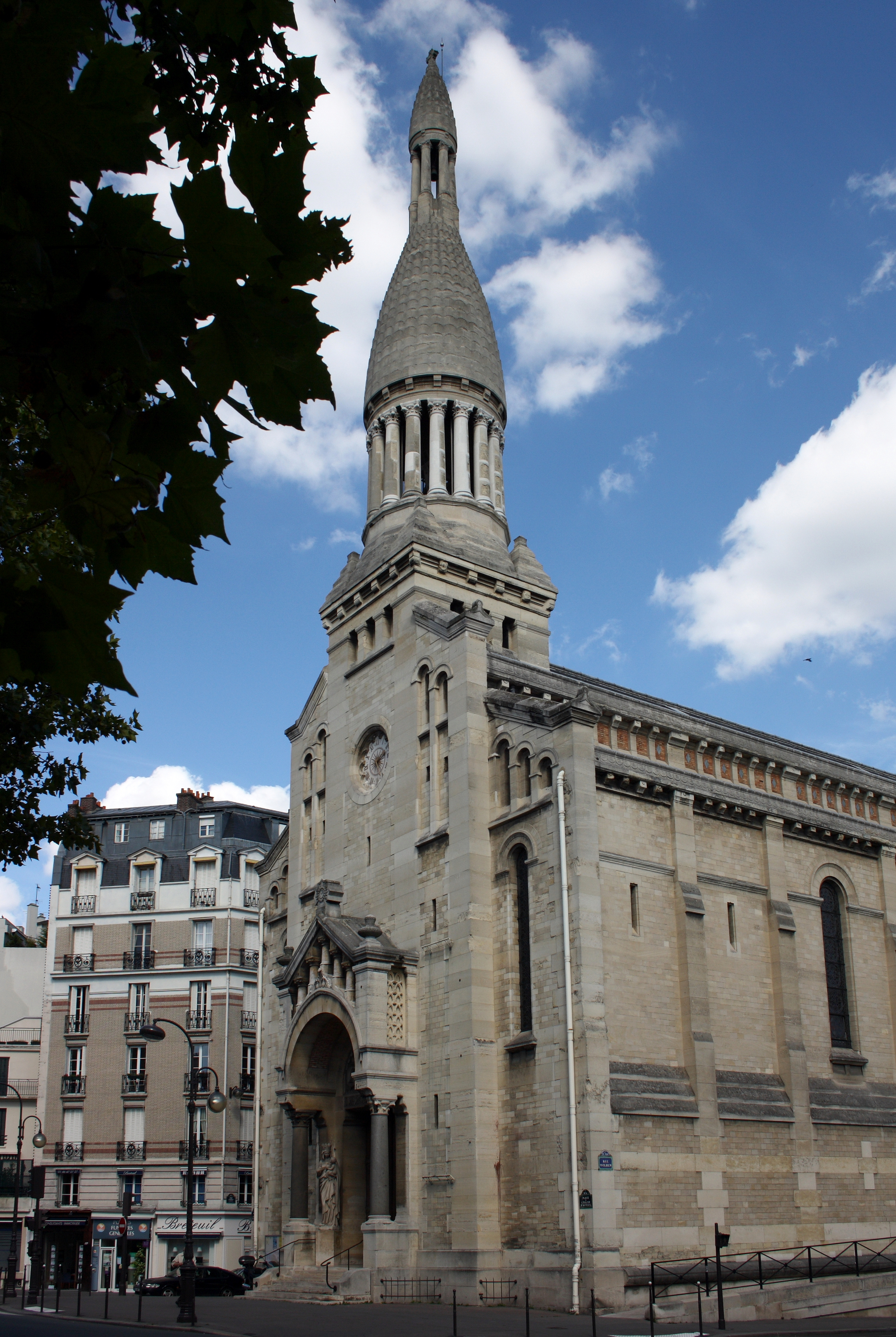
Notre-Dame d'Auteuil

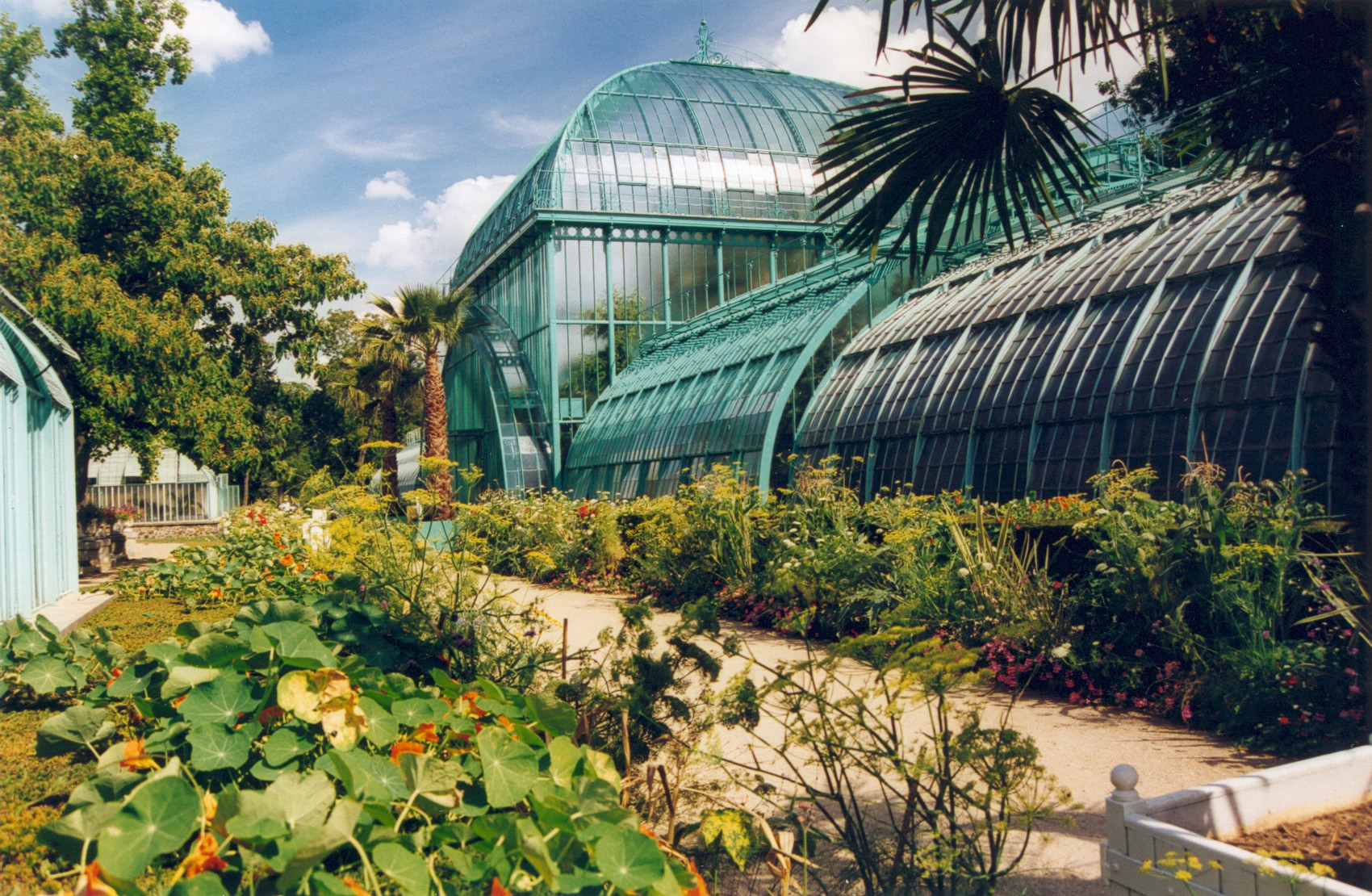
The Jardin des Serres d'Auteuil

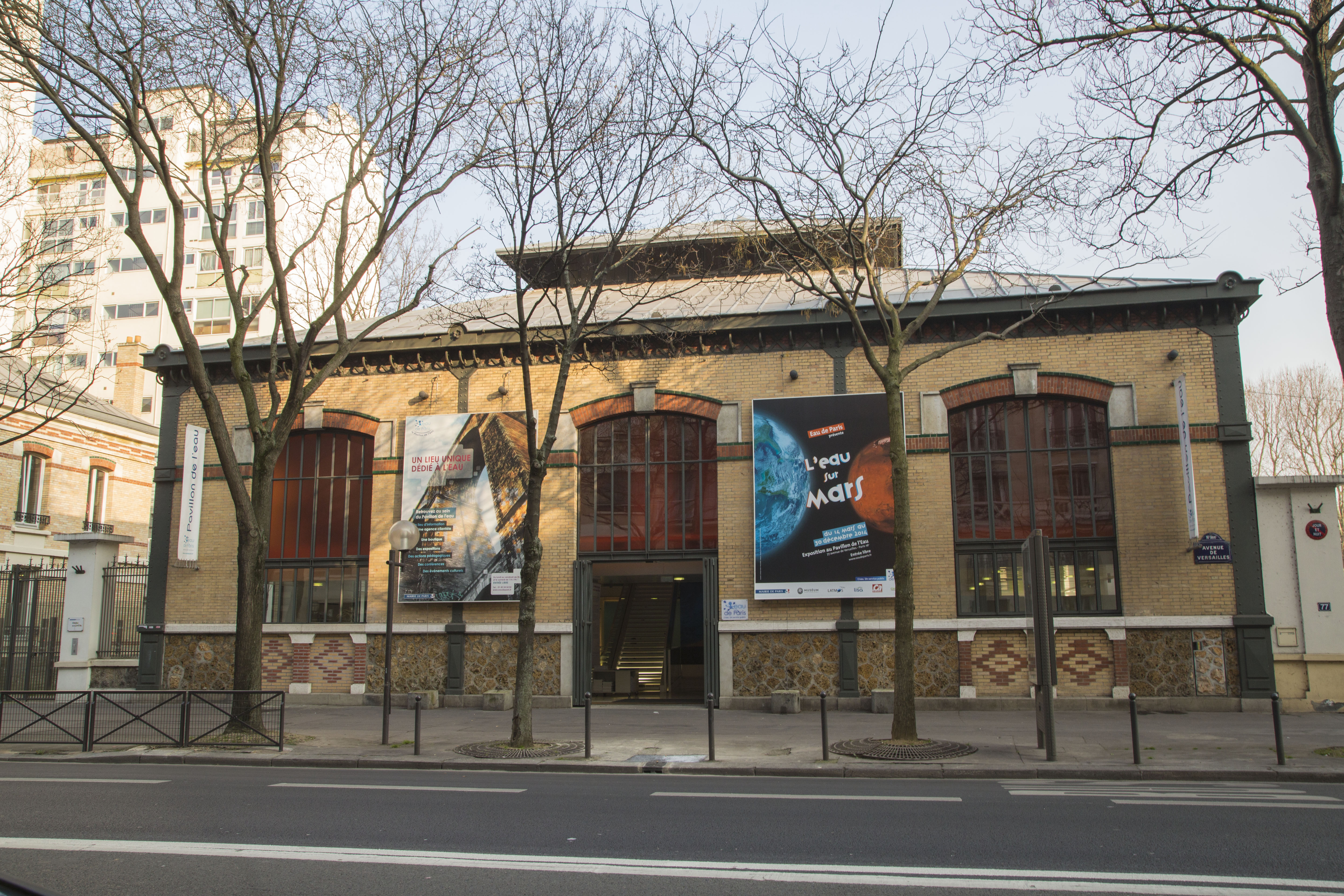
The Pavillon de l'eau

Maison La Roche

== Sport ==
Auteuil is known for its famous stadiums:

- Stade Roland Garros where the tennis French Open is played
- Parc des Princes which is the home of football club Paris Saint-Germain
- Stade Jean-Bouin which is the home of rugby club Stade Français
- Auteuil Hippodrome where steeplechase races are held
- Piscine Molitor, an art deco swimming pool protected as national heritage site
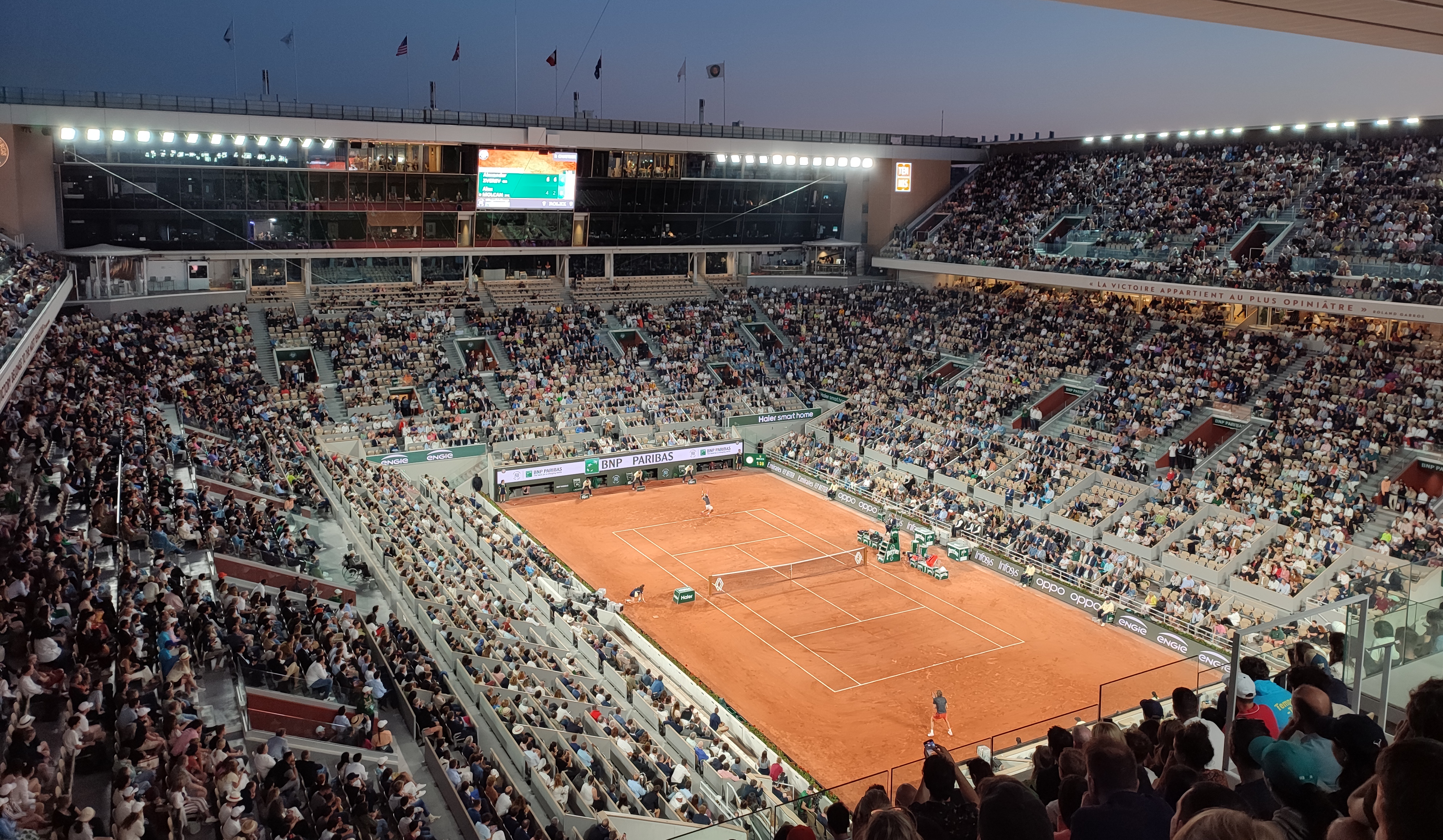
Stade Roland Garros

Parc des Princes

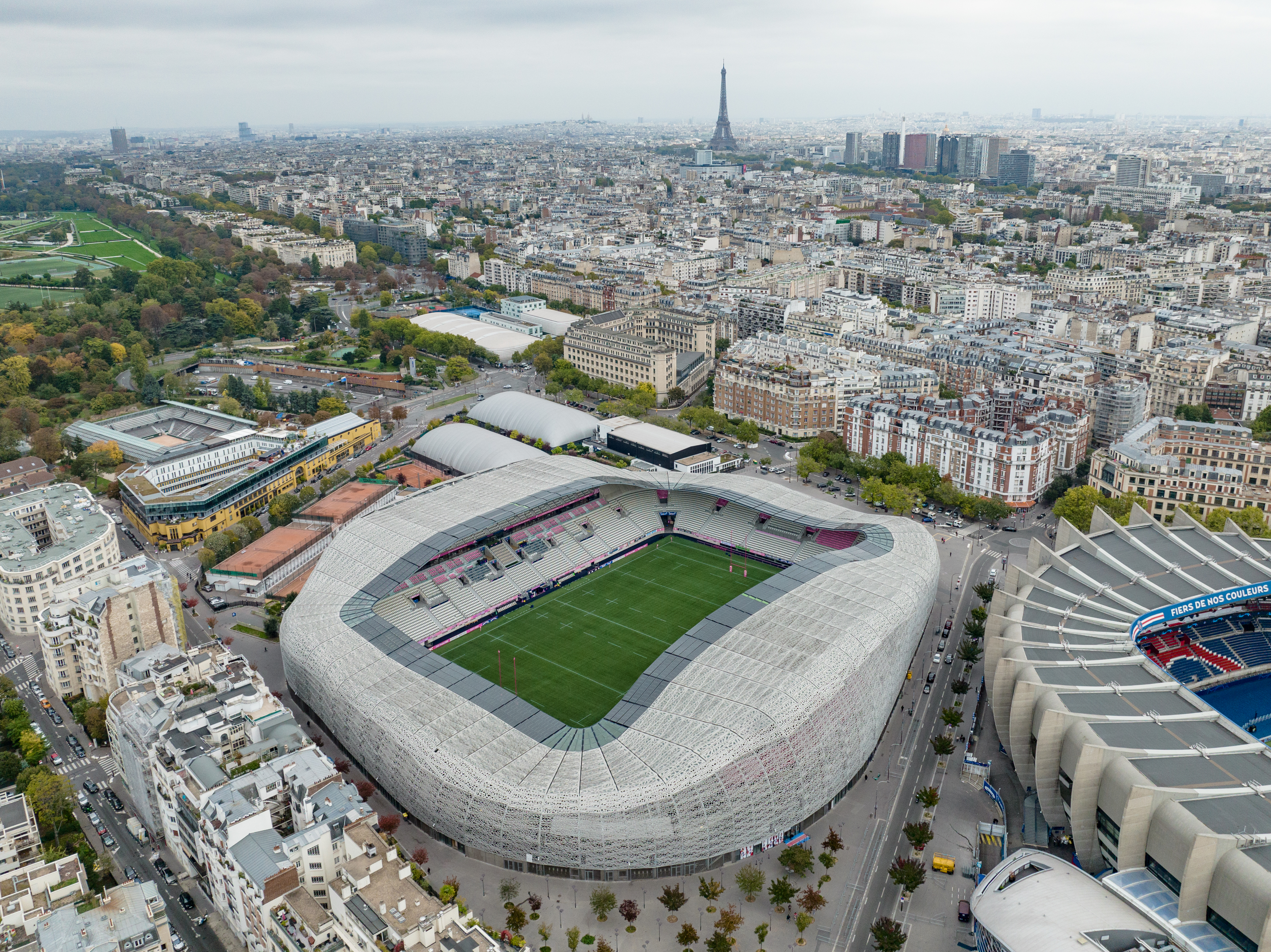
Stade Jean-Bouin

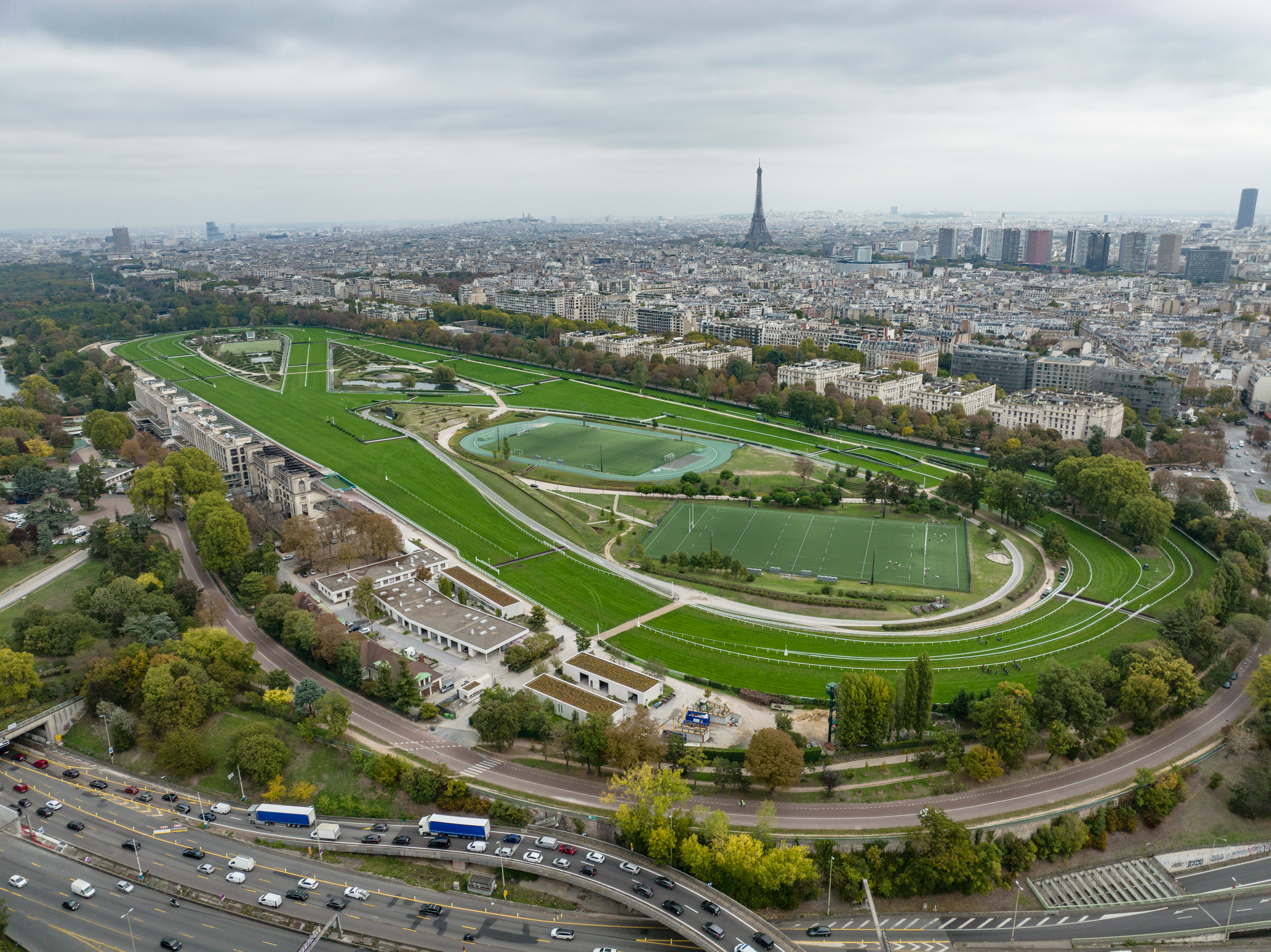
Auteuil Hippodrome

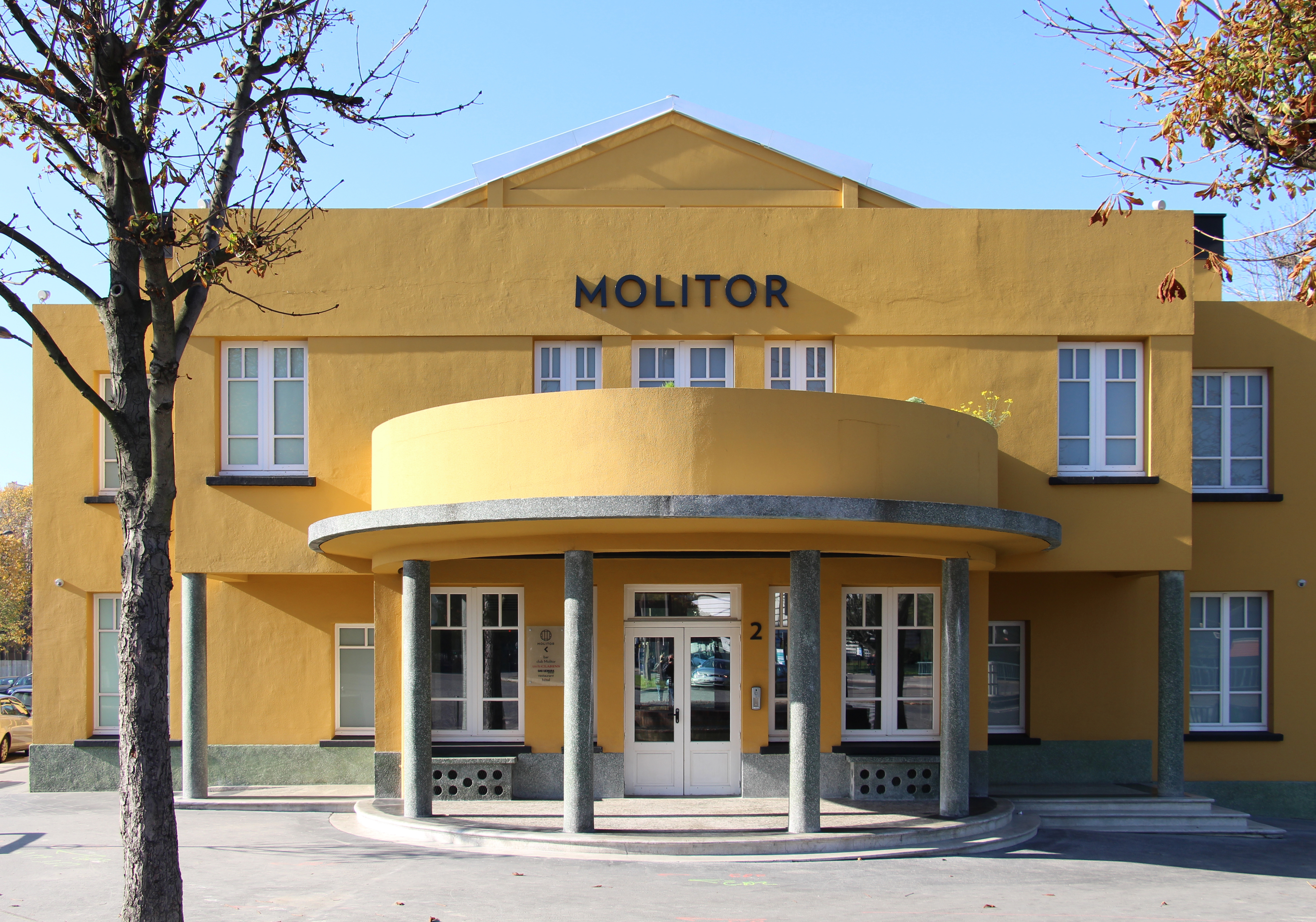
Piscine Molitor

== Education ==
Auteuil is home to the Lycée Jean-Baptiste-Say operating as a collège, lycée and preparatory classes.

== Notable people ==
The borough of Auteuil was the birthplace of Marcel Proust and of Charles Baudelaire. It was also the home of Molière.

Thérèse Anaïs Rigo, better known by her pseudonym Anaïs de Bassanville, a journalist, was born in 1802 in Auteuil and died there in 1884.

== In popular culture ==
In The Count of Monte Cristo by Alexandre Dumas, the main (fictional) character Edmond Dantès buys his country residence in Auteuil.

In My Old Man (short story) by Ernest Hemingway, Auteuil serves as the site of the fictional Prix du Marat, a 4500-meter steeplechase horse race.
