= Eau de Paris =

French water supply and waste collection company

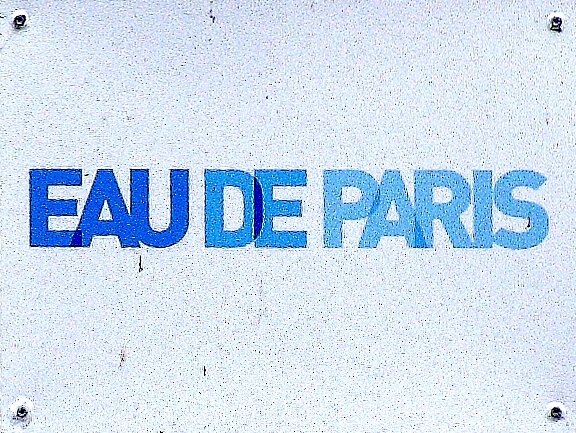
- Company type: Municipally owned corporation
- Industry: Water industry
- Founded: 1 February 2009
- Headquarters: Paris
- Area served: Paris
- Key people: Célia Blauel (chair)
- Products: Drinking water
- Parent: City of Paris
- Website: www.eaudeparis.fr

Eau de Paris (Paris Water) is the publicly owned company responsible for the public water supply and waste water collection for the city of Paris.

== History ==
In 1985, Jacques Chirac, then Mayor of Paris decided to transfer the municipal water service into the hands of three private entities with a direct contract and without a public procurement procedure. The property of water wasn't formally transferred and was kept as a public common good. Eau et Force and Compagnie des Eaux de Paris had a 25-year concession for the distribution and customer services respectively related to the right and left banks of the River Seine. On December 1, 1986, the company SAGEP (Soc Anonyme Gestion des Eaux de Paris) was established. In 1987, the water production and transport were delegated for a 25-years period to SAGEP, a semi-public company owned by Ville de Paris (70%) and Suez & Veolia (28%).

SAGEP was renamed Eau de Paris in January 2005.

Eau de Paris was created in 2008 after a ballot initiative from then Mayor Bertrand Delanoë. The city's water was then substantially managed by two private companies (Veolia and Suez) which the municipal government bought out.

In 2026, the Eau de Paris headquarters moved to the 13th arrondissement of Paris.

== Operations ==
The company distributes 563,000 m³ of drinking water a day. In 2010 the company began installing drinking fountains dispensing fizzy water in the city.

Paris has 1,311 drinking water fountains, including 17 sparkling water fountains.

== See also ==
- Pavillon de l'eau
