= Michel Rigo =

18th and 19th century Genoese painter

- Born: 1772; Genoa
- Died: 1815 (aged 42–43)
- Known for: Historical painting

Michel Rigo (1772 – 1815) was an artist from Genoa who accompanied the French army under Napoleon Bonaparte in their campaign in Egypt and Syria in 1798. Rigo has been described as "the first Western portraitist to work in Egypt."

== Biography ==
In the early 1800s, a number of paintings depicting Napoleon's campaign in Egypt and Syria were displayed at the Parisian Salon. Well-known examples include Louis-François Lejeune's Battle of the Pyramids and Antoine-Jean Gros’ Bonaparte Visiting the Plague Victims of Jaffa. Most of the contemporary paintings which depicted Napoleon's exploits in Egypt were produced by artists who had not been to Egypt with Napoleon. Michel Rigo was the exception.

Little is known about Rigo's life prior to his joining the Egyptian campaign. It is thought that Rigo would have been trained by local artists in Genoa before volunteering to join the French expedition, parts of which had sailed from Genoa.

Rigo spent much of his time in Egypt building and painting stage designs for plays, as well as props for celebrations. He was involved in planning the public celebrations of 22 September 1798 in Cairo commemorating the founding of the First French Republic. He designed a triumphal arch to be erected in Azbakiyya Square for the celebrations. After it was erected, Rigo painted it with scenes from the Battle of the Pyramids.

While in Egypt, Napoleon commissioned Rigo to paint a series of portraits of Arab sheikhs who had served in the French puppet government - the Divan. The paintings were displayed in his Egyptian headquarters. After the French left Egypt in 1801, Rigo's paintings were brought back to France. After Napoleon divorced his wife Josephine, Josephine was given the portraits as part of the divorce settlement and they were displayed at Josephine's mansion of Malmaison.

Rigo's works became an important part of Napoleon's propaganda. Having the paintings of the sheikhs commissioned lent legitimacy to French imperialism in the East, because the paintings "presented tangible evidence that natives did have a say in the everyday political affairs of the country."

When Rigo returned to Europe, he was admitted as a founding member of the Institut d'Égypt's arts and letters division on 22 August 1798.
