= Lycée Molière (Paris) =

Public secondary school in Paris, France, established in 1888

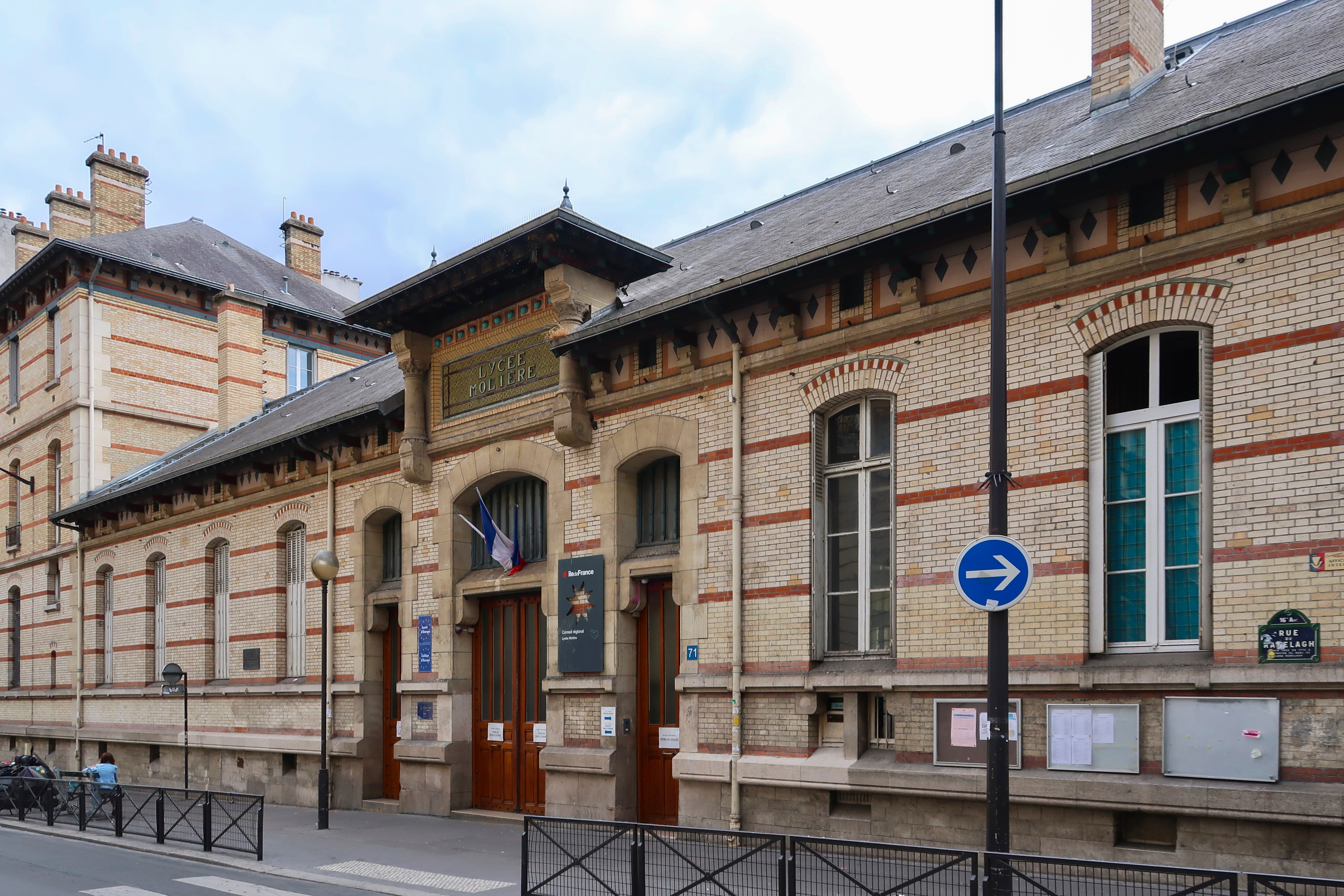
- Main façade of the lycée on rue du Ranelagh.

Location
- 71, rue du Ranelagh; Paris; Paris, 75016; France
- Coordinates: 48.8551°N 2.2721°E

Information
- Type: Établissement public local d'enseignement|Public local educational establishment (EPLE)
- Established: October 8, 1888
- Authority: Académie de Paris
- Principal: M. Irankhah.
- Teaching staff: 120
- Grades: Collège; General Lycée; Classe préparatoire aux grandes écoles (CPGE) literary
- Enrollment: 1360
- Language: English, German, Spanish, Portuguese, Italian, Latin, Ancient Greek
- Website: pia.ac-paris.fr

The Lycée Molière is a French public local educational establishment, established in 1888, comprising both a collège and a lycée. It is located at 71, Rue du Ranelagh in Paris, in the 16th arrondissement and is named after the French playwright Jean-Baptiste Poquelin, known as Molière (1622–1673).

Historically, the lycée was the third girls' lycée in the capital. Built by the architect Émile Vaudremer, it opened its doors on 8 October 1888, with 48 students. Initially intended to provide intellectual education to young women in western Paris, it became a space for promoting female emancipation and helped train part of the French female elite in the early 20th century.

The establishment became coeducational in 1973. It now prepares students for the brevet, the baccalauréat, and competitive entrance exams for classes préparatoires aux grandes écoles. Today, it has over 1,300 students.

== History ==
=== Beginning ===
==== Background and foundation ====
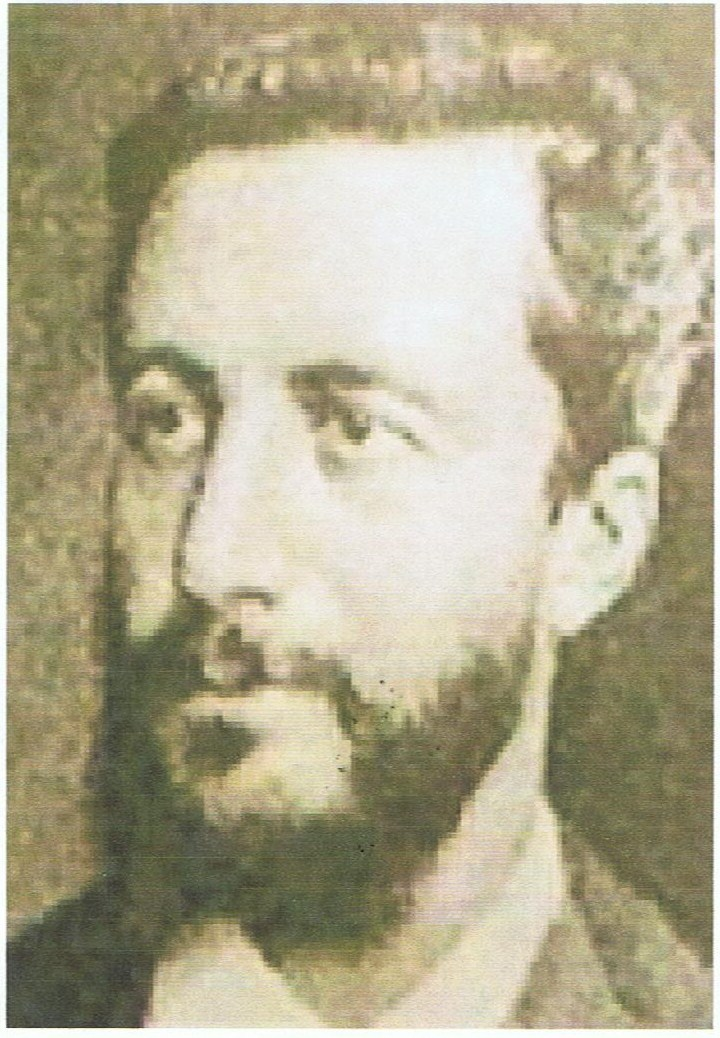
The deputy Camille Sée, whose 1880 law, named after him, enabled the opening of girls' lycées.

Under the French Third Republic, in 1880, the Camille Sée law authorized girls to receive secondary education, leading to the creation of girls’ lycées. Lycée Molière was one of the first 23 such institutions established in France. Despite initial hesitation over implementing the law, progress followed: in 1882, Minister of Public Instruction Paul Bert instructed rectors to allocate funds for new schools, and by 1884, a budget of 900,000 francs was approved for the construction of what would become Lycée Molière—the third girls’ lycée in Paris, after Lycée Fénelon (1883) and Lycée Racine (1886).

Unlike its predecessors, the new lycée was built in the then sparsely populated 16th arrondissement, an area of private residences and large gardens. Its location, chosen for its healthy and open environment near the Bois de Boulogne, was part of the former eight-hectare park of the Château de Boulainvilliers (also known as Château de la Tuilerie), dismantled in 1826. The school was intended as the female counterpart to the Lycée Janson-de-Sailly, established nearby in 1881 for boys.

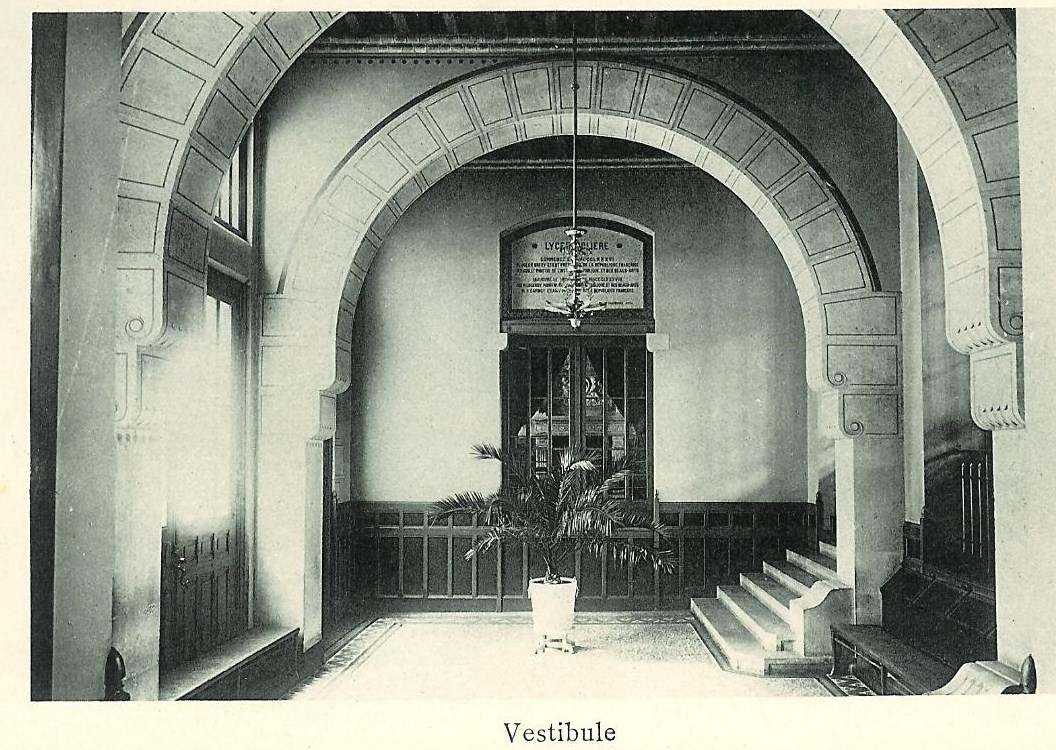
The vestibule, from a late 19th century lycée brochure (phot. J. David).

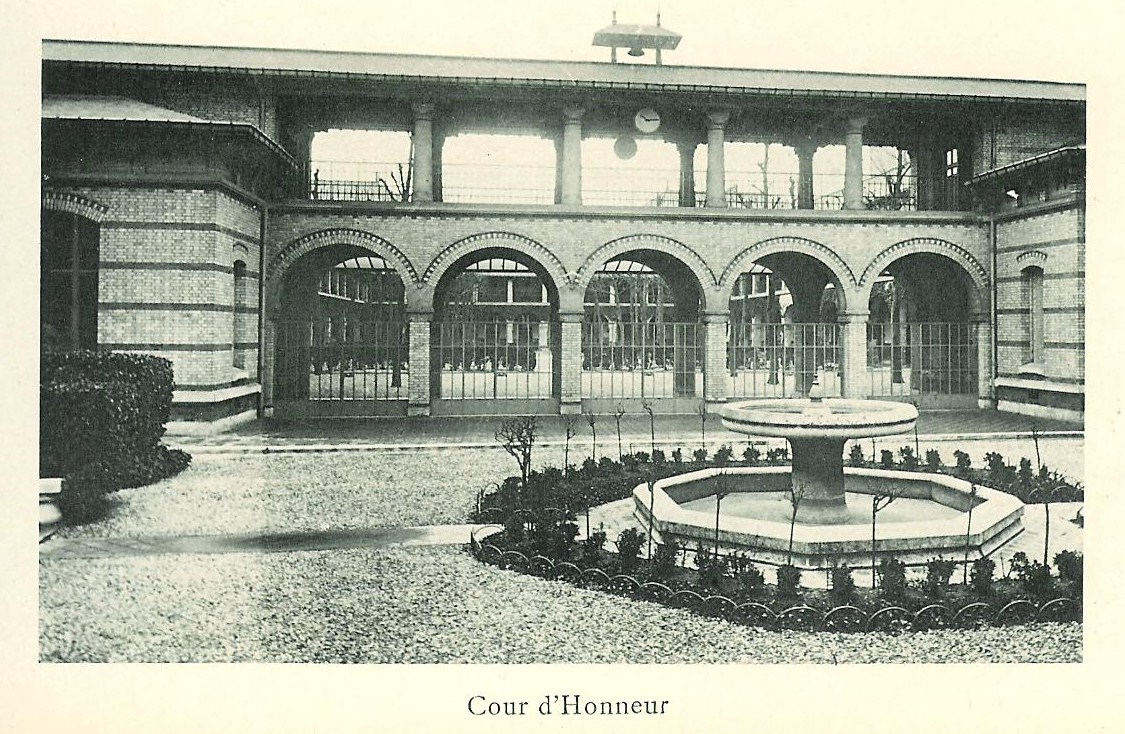
The courtyard of honor, same brochure.

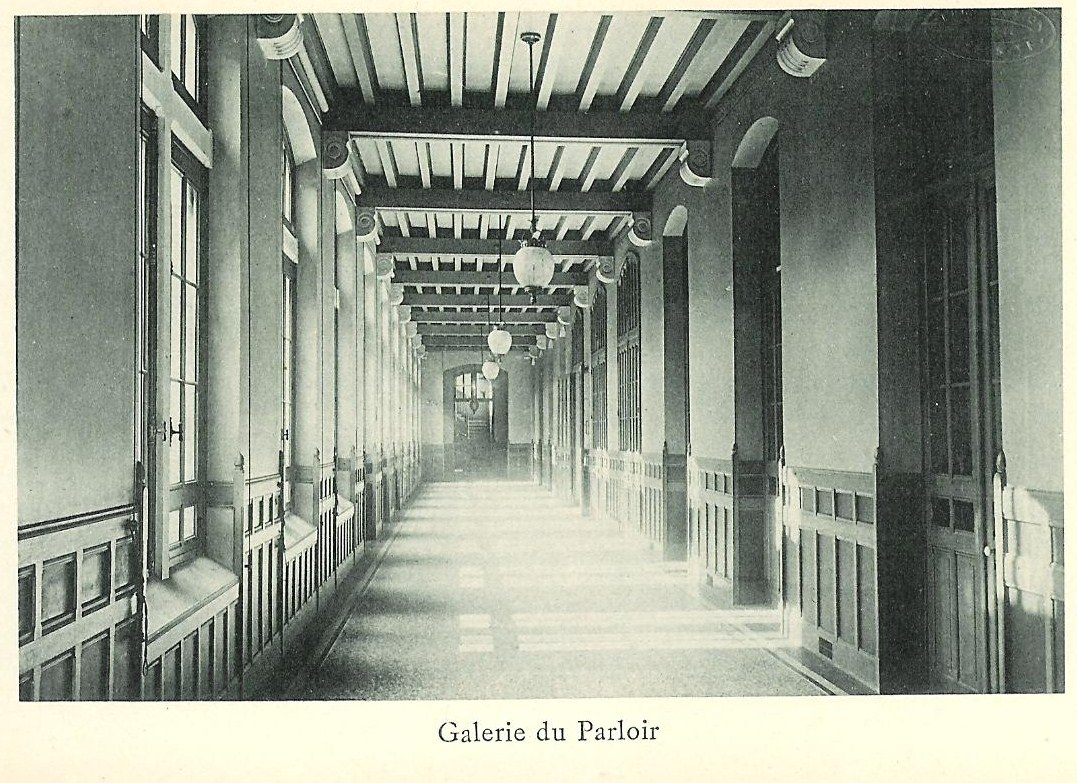
A corridor, same brochure.

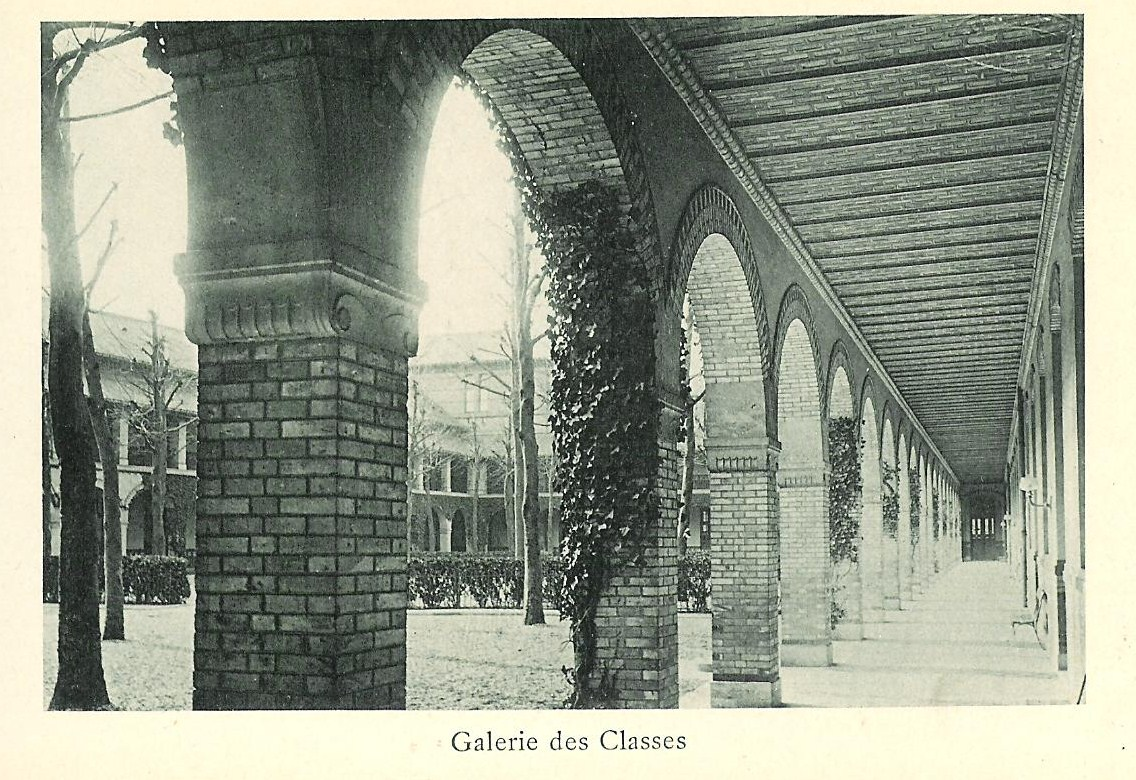
Arcades, same brochure.

Designed by architect Émile Vaudremer (also responsible for the Lycée Buffon in the 15th arrondissement), construction of the lycée took place between 1886 and 1888, at a cost of 1,720,000 francs. The school officially opened on 8 October 1888, with Minister of Public Instruction Édouard Lockroy and academy rector Octave Gréard in attendance. Enrollment had begun on 3 September. A commemorative mosaic plaque marks the dates of its construction and inauguration. While the establishment of the lycée met little opposition, the choice of the name Molière drew some criticism. Columnist Henri Becque, writing in Le Figaro, questioned the appropriateness of naming a girls’ school after a playwright known for satirical portrayals of women.

Nonetheless, the inauguration was positively covered by the press, including Le Temps and Le Soleil. A student at the time described the building as “a beautiful, brand-new lycée, with a solemn yet welcoming parlor, vast corridors, [and] wide-open galleries, dispelling any notion of a prison". However, the new public institution also faced competition from longstanding private schools in the area, such as the Dames de l’Assomption.

==== Operation ====
===== Administration and teaching staff =====
At its founding, the Lycée Molière included both preparatory (primary) and secondary courses. It opened with 48 students, though it was designed to accommodate up to 350, including 175 half-boarders. Mlle Henriette Stoude, a graduate in letters and among the first women to pass the agrégation (1883), was appointed principal in accordance with legal requirements that girls' lycées be headed by women. Unlike boys’ lycées, the school initially lacked a general supervisor. A housekeeper assisted the principal, who also taught a course on moral instruction. Once enrollment exceeded 100 students, a general supervisor was appointed.

The teaching staff was composed of women who had passed competitive examinations. Those with the agrégation, typically graduates of the École normale supérieure de jeunes filles in Sèvres (founded in 1881), held the title of professor. Others, certified or licensed, were designated as course instructors, particularly at the collège level. Parents met with teachers biweekly. According to 1890 ministerial instructions, teachers were expected not only to instruct in their subject area but also to cultivate reflective, honest, and civic-minded students. Among the first teachers were Mlles. Leroux, Dugard, Aaron, and Tolmer (French); Mlle. Flobert (history); Mlle. Margaret Scott and Mme. Bickart (English); Mlle. Schach (German); Mme. Ficquet (mathematics); Mme. Mallet (physical sciences); Mme. Jobet-Duval (gymnastics); Mlle. Moria (drawing); and Mme. Mansoy (music). Preparatory classes were taught by Mmes. Armagnat, Brouin, and Turpin. In the early years, due to the limited number of trained women, male teachers such as M. Pelissier and M. Gohin (Latin) also taught at the school, coming from the nearby Lycée Janson-de-Sailly. Some teachers gained particular recognition. Mlle. Bérillon published a book based on her pedagogical work; Mlle. Moria, a visual arts teacher, wore a toga on occasion and won a silver medal at the 1924 Salon des artistes français, and Mme. Ficquet organized astronomy evenings using a telescope installed at the lycée.

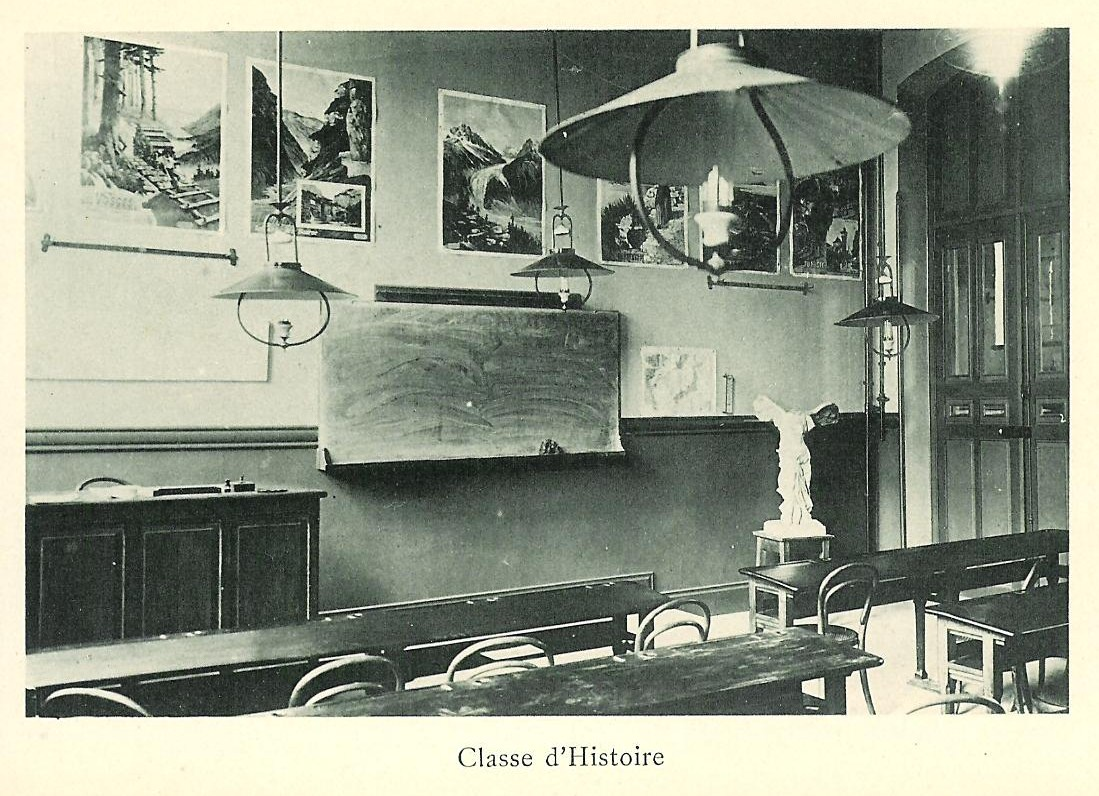
The history classroom.

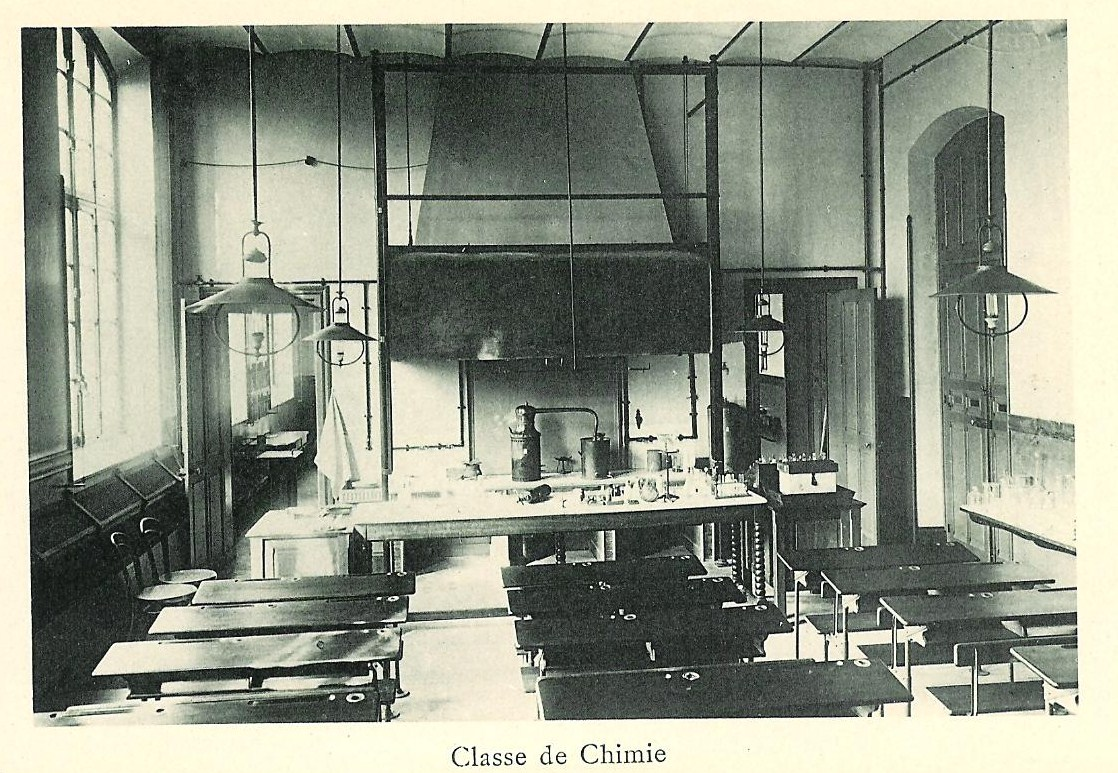
The chemistry classroom.

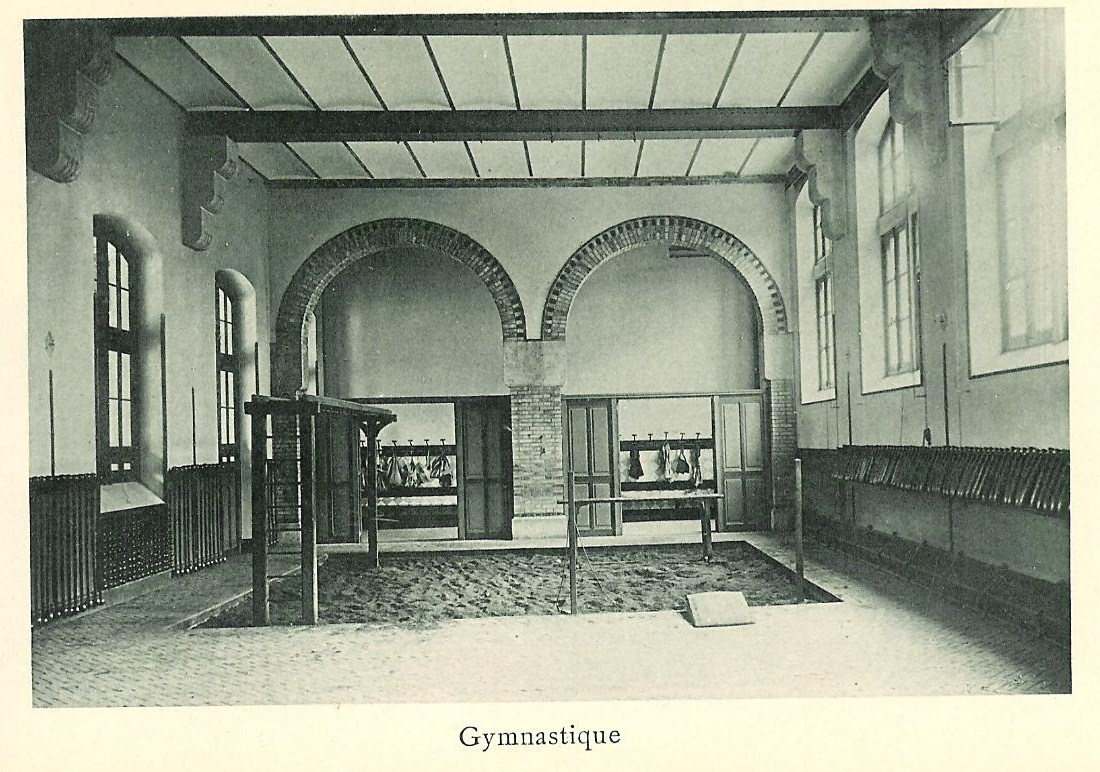
The gymnasium.

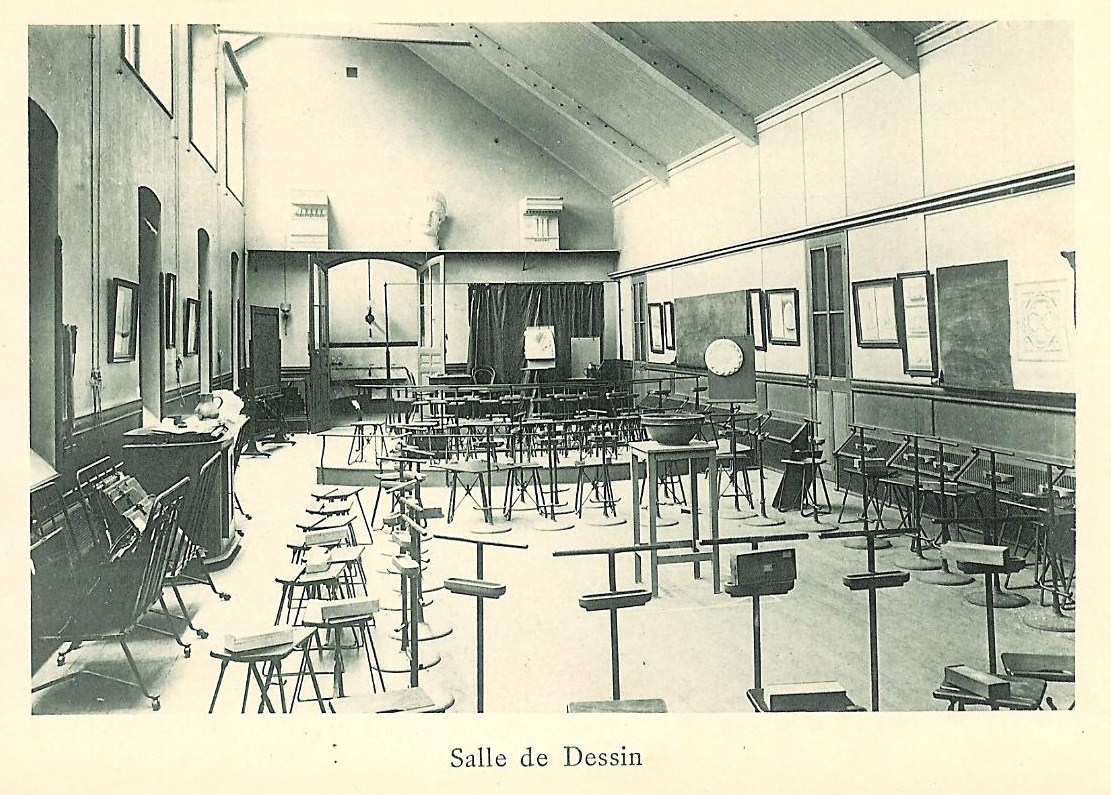
The drawing classroom.

===== Courses =====
The curriculum was divided into preparatory (primary) and secondary cycles. The preparatory section included four years for students aged 7 to 12, with subjects such as history and foreign languages (English and German) offered to advanced pupils. From 1914, boys were admitted to these classes if they had a sister enrolled. The secondary cycle covered five years, typically for ages 12 to 17—one year shorter than the equivalent boys' lycée program. Exams were held annually, with a certificate of secondary studies awarded in the third year and a diploma of secondary studies in the fifth. This diploma allowed graduates to become primary school teachers or private tutors. All subjects were mandatory for the first three years, with optional courses introduced in the final two. Subjects included French literature and language; two foreign languages (selected from English, German, Spanish, and Italian); history; Latin and Greek translation; mathematics; physical and natural sciences; moral instruction; basic law; sewing; and gymnastics. Students could pursue a literary or scientific track, though the overall workload was lighter than that in boys' lycées, in line with ministry guidelines.

While the girls’ lycée structure was inspired by boys' institutions, the intent was not to replicate them. An 1881 commission emphasized that the final examination should not resemble the baccalauréat, which was not initially offered to female students. As noted by historian Marie-Louise Rançon, early girls’ lycées aimed to provide a broad, disinterested education, without a strict focus on exams or competitive entrance. The state sought to educate future wives of civil servants through secular institutions, as an alternative to religious schools. The curriculum was revised throughout the 1890s. Drawing and music theory, for example, became optional. Over time, the educational structure evolved into: Enfantine II and I (elementary), followed by three years of preparatory classes and six years of secondary education, including optional final-year classes in philosophy or mathematics. The class naming system was inverted compared to boys' lycées: instead of progressing from sixième to terminale, students advanced from première to sixième, with the final year optional.

===== School life and discipline =====
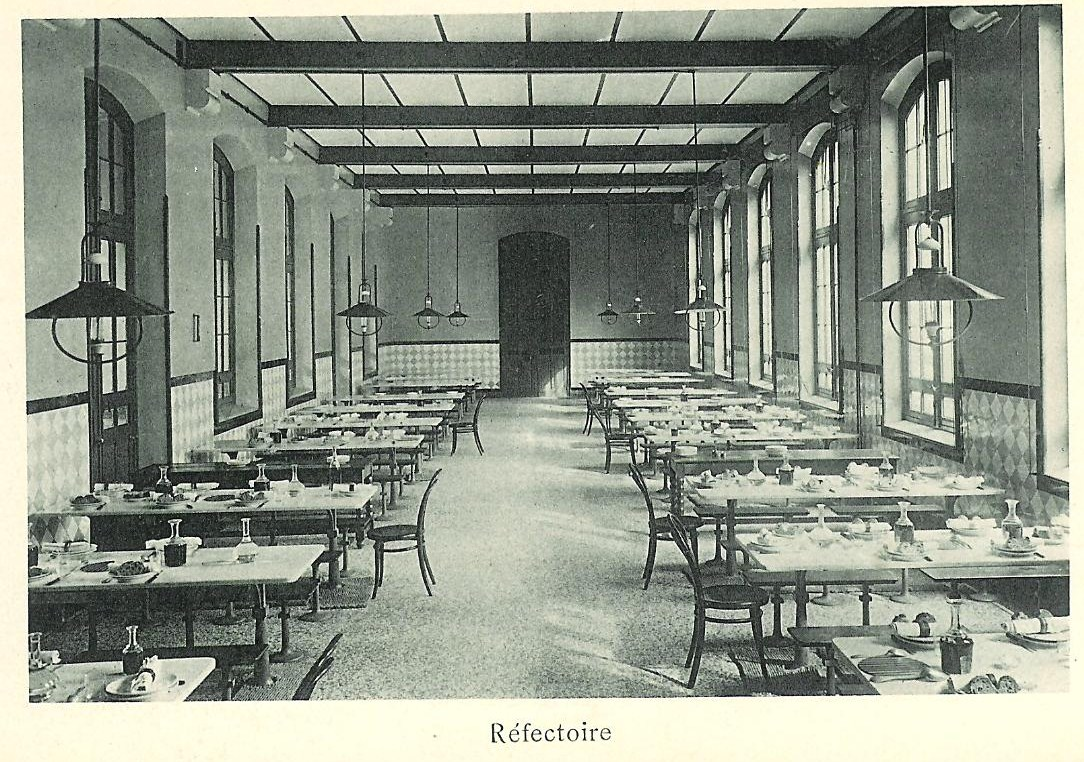
The dining hall.

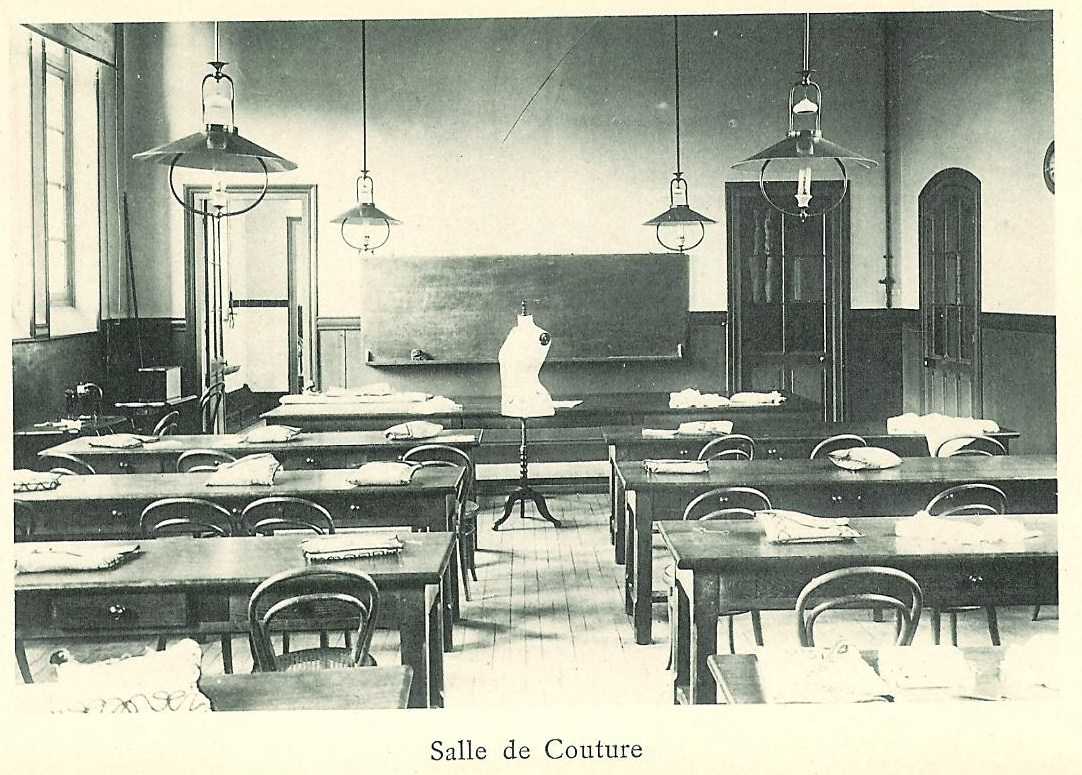
The sewing room.

The Lycée Molière offered two types of regimes: a standard day school schedule (8:30 a.m.–10:30 a.m. and 1:30 p.m.–3:30 p.m.) and a supervised day school regime with additional study hours (10:30 a.m.–12:00 p.m. and 3:30 p.m.–5:30 p.m.), both subject to fees, except for the daughters of civil servants. Curricula developed by Octave Gréard remained cautious, aiming to preserve students’ health and allow time for domestic and social duties.

Jewish students were exempt from written work on Saturdays, and classes were not held on Thursdays, as was common at the time. Each class had a dedicated classroom, study room, and cloakroom. Most students arrived by public transport, accompanied by maids, and could not leave without written parental permission. Classrooms for younger students were on the ground floor, while older students were taught upstairs. The gymnasium was located at the rear of the courtyard. Ceremonies and charity events were held either in the school’s large rooms or the principal’s courtyard. Discipline was strict. A student recalled being expected to greet the principal with proper decorum and dress neatly, including wearing gloves and buttoned coats. This rigor was intended to protect the school’s reputation at a time when girls’ lycées faced public scrutiny. Students wore black aprons, and mirrors were avoided to discourage vanity.

===== Impact of courses and female emancipation =====
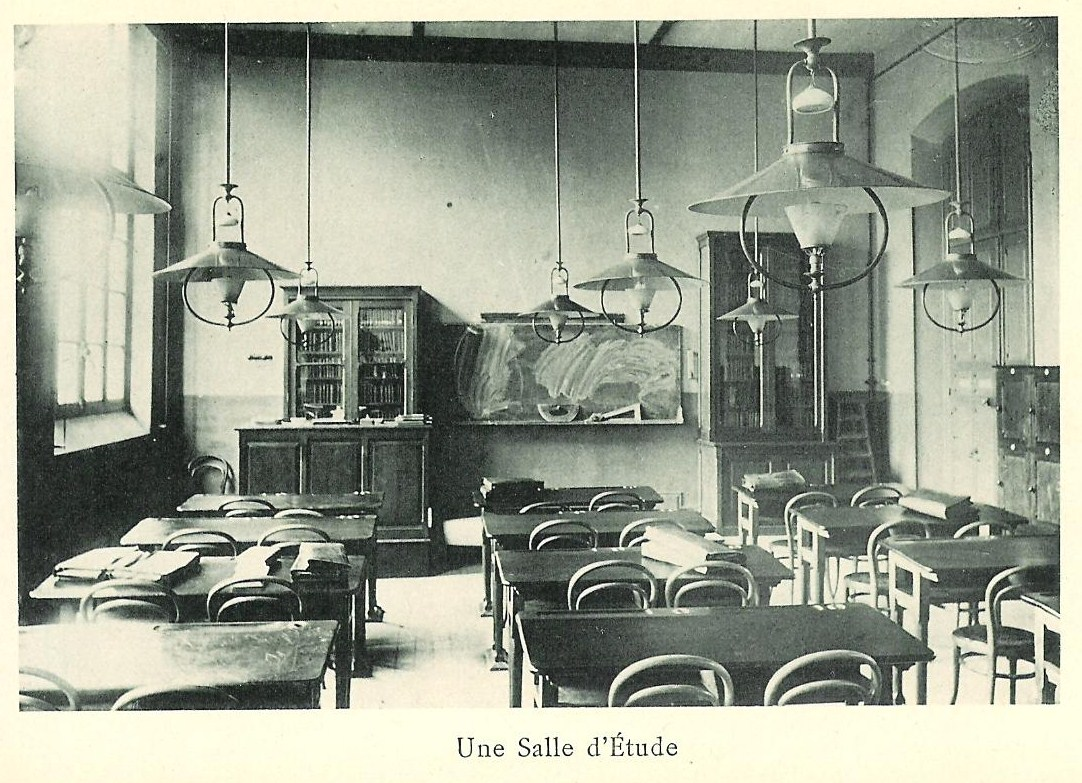
A study room.

The Lycée Molière prioritized intellectual development over vocational training. As principal Mlle Stoude stated: “We have only taught you how to learn". The curriculum, focused on history and literature, provided broad but non-specialized cultural education.

According to historian Marie-Louise Rançon, the aim was to cultivate intelligent, cultured women, without replicating the model of boys' lycées. However, the lycée also fostered new aspirations. One student described it as “a symbol of emancipation and a breeding ground for new aspirations", while another emphasized the lasting influence of teachers who encouraged continued intellectual activity.

The lycée contributed significantly to women's access to higher education. Several alumnae pursued academic and professional paths traditionally closed to women. Jeanne Debat-Ponsan passed the medical agrégation; Marie Dujardin-Beaumetz earned a doctorate in natural sciences (1911); and Madeleine Dalmeyda passed the letters agrégation (1916). Other former students succeeded in competitive exams in history, mathematics, law, and science throughout the early 20th century. Notably, Louise Weiss earned the letters agrégation in 1914.

=== Early 20th century to World War I ===
==== Evolution of student population and course organization ====
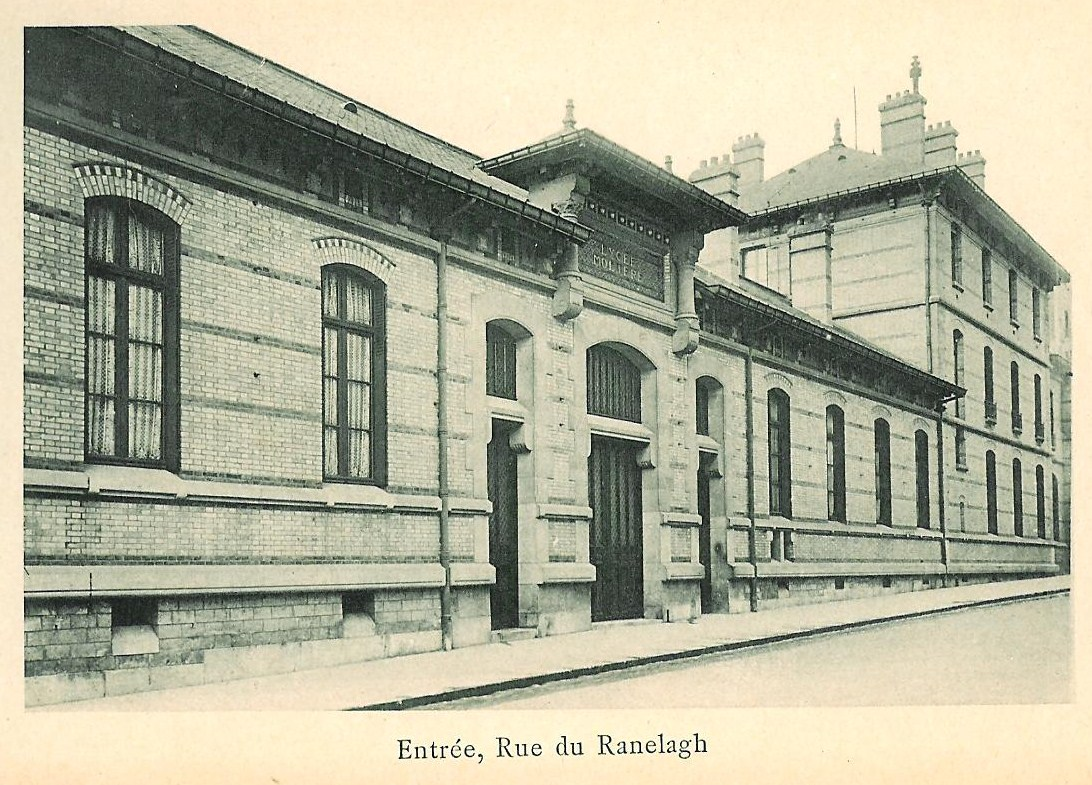
The main façade of the lycée, facing rue du Ranelagh, at the turn of the century.

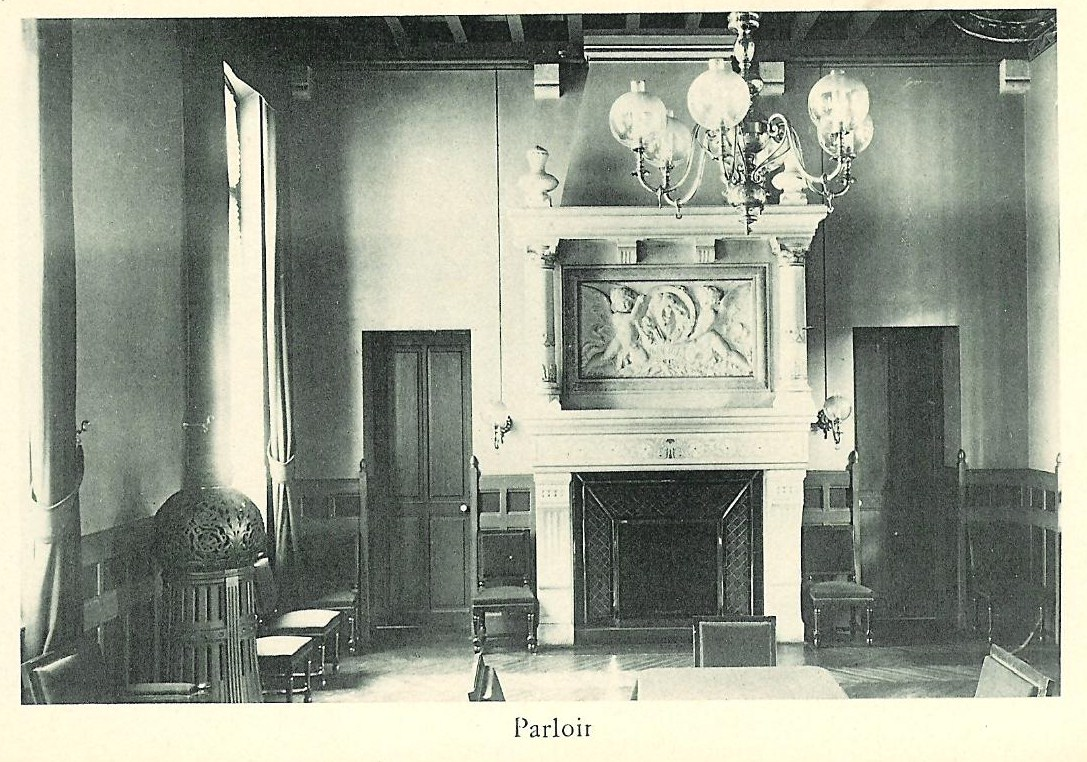
The former parlor, at the end of the 19th century.

Following curriculum stabilization in 1897 and a broader enrollment of girls, student numbers at Lycée Molière grew from 48 in 1888 to 244 by 1896. Growth then stagnated due to transport limitations, but resumed after 1905 with the closure of religious schools and increased urbanization. By 1913, enrollment reached 573. That same year, six students presented for the baccalauréat—all passed. A sixth-year philosophy course had been added unofficially in 1912 to support academic aspirations, though some classes (like Latin) remained fee-based when taught by outside instructors. (Note: The portrait of Mathilde Cormier, a baccalauréat graduate from Lycée Molière, and her diploma are featured in Marie-Hélène Westphalen's book, Les lycéens. Mémoires d'élèves et de professeurs (1880–1980), Les Arènes, 2013, p. 29.)

The Republican education model introduced bi-monthly report cards, honor rolls, and end-of-trimester prize ceremonies. In 1915, new electrical systems allowed full science courses. Discipline remained strict but effective—between 1902 and 1922, only two expulsions were recorded. Charitable activities were prominent, led by English teacher Mlle. Scott, including clothing drives, events for underprivileged children, and tuition support for disadvantaged students. These efforts declined after World War II.

==== Boarding school projects and modernization ====
Though boarding was not originally permitted under the 1880 education law, a small residence was established in 1912 at 28 Rue de l’Assomption, under Henriette Martin-Le Dieu. Chaplaincies for Catholic, Protestant, and Jewish students were introduced around 1900. The lycée gained telephone access and maintained a student choir that performed annually at the Sorbonne. Students were vaccinated yearly against smallpox—using vaccine material collected on site.

==== World War I ====
World War I disrupted school life. In 1914, only 418 of 580 expected students enrolled, and the boarding facility housed just seven students. Due to air raids, discipline was relaxed. In October 1915, electric lighting replaced gas lighting after work began in July. In 1915, gas lighting was replaced by electricity, and black aprons were replaced by blue or beige versions with embroidered names. Students contributed to the war effort through donations, sewing workshops, and fieldwork. Each class supported a soldier at the front.

Despite the war, academic ambition grew. Higher-level courses—precursors to preparatory classes for grandes écoles—were introduced. Scientific preparation intensified, aligned with new opportunities for women in higher education, such as the École centrale (opened to women) and the creation of specialized schools in 1916 and 1917. After the 1917 Russian Revolution, many émigré families enrolled their daughters at the lycée, forming a distinct and high-achieving group. In March 1918, students sheltered in the basement during bombardments. After the war, a German cannon was placed in the school courtyard as a symbol of victory.

=== Interwar period and World War II ===
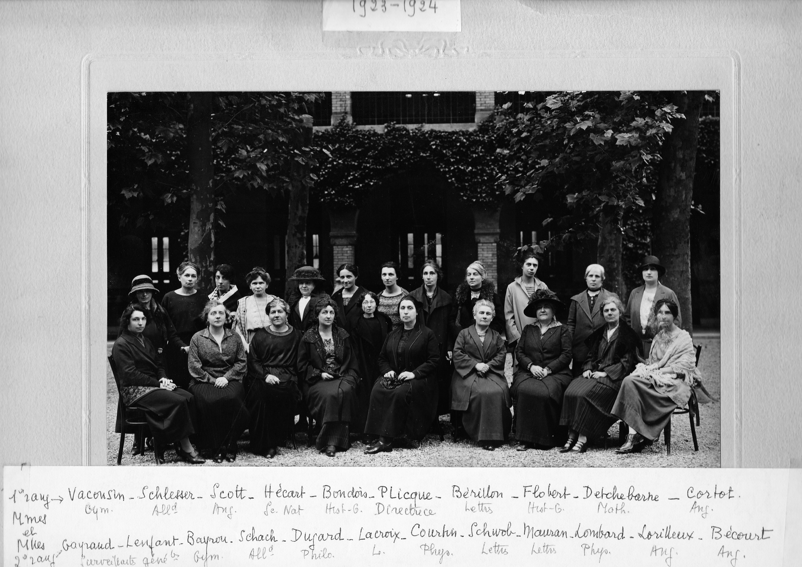
Photograph of the lycée's female teachers for the 1923–1924 school year (taken in the courtyard).

Secondary class structure for the 1920–1921 school year:

1st year: sections A, B, C.

2nd year: sections A, B, C.

3rd year: sections A, B, C.

4th year: sections A, B.

5th year: sections A, B, C, D.

6th year: one philosophy class, one elementary mathematics class

Baccalauréat results:

Elementary mathematics class: 9 passes (mentions: 1 Very Good, 1 Good, 2 Fairly Good)

Philosophy class: 19 passes (mentions: 2 Good, 7 Fairly Good)

Latin-sciences class: 6 passes (mentions: 2 Fairly Good)

Latin-languages class: 19 passes (mentions: 1 Good, 1 Fairly Good)

Sciences-languages class: 13 passes (mentions: 1 Good, 3 Fairly Good) _

Secondary class structure for the 1938–1939 school year:

1st year: 4 sections.

2nd year: 4 sections.

3rd year: 4 sections.

4th year: 4 sections.

5th year: 4 sections.

6th year: 4 sections.

Two philosophy classes, one elementary mathematics class

Baccalauréat results:

Elementary mathematics class: 16 passes (mentions: 1 Fairly Good)

Philosophy class: 60 passes (mentions: 1 Good, 15 Fairly Good)

During the interwar period, increasing numbers of girls pursued secondary education. By 1938, the Lycée Molière had 1,350 students, with excess demand partially alleviated by the nearby Lycée Jean-de-La-Fontaine. The 1919 creation of the female baccalauréat positioned exam preparation as a central objective, though it remained unofficially recognized for some time. Limitations in Latin and the absence of Greek instruction prompted the lycée to enlist external teachers—often male—for supplementary, fee-based courses. Education reforms, including the 1924 Léon Bérard decree, aligned male and female curricula over seven years (6th to terminale), enabling female students to access grandes écoles under the new framework of free secondary education.

In 1920, a mathematics course was introduced, and by 1930, students began competing in the Concours général. Jacqueline David (later Jacqueline de Romilly) notably won first prize in Latin translation and second in Greek. Former students achieved prestigious distinctions, including appointments as curators, researchers, and admission to elite institutions such as the École centrale.

Student life became more liberal: students increasingly attended cinemas and social events. In 1926, a dance celebrating the principal’s Legion of Honor was held at the lycée. Between 1936 and 1939, philosopher Simone de Beauvoir taught at the lycée, before being dismissed due to a relationship with a student.

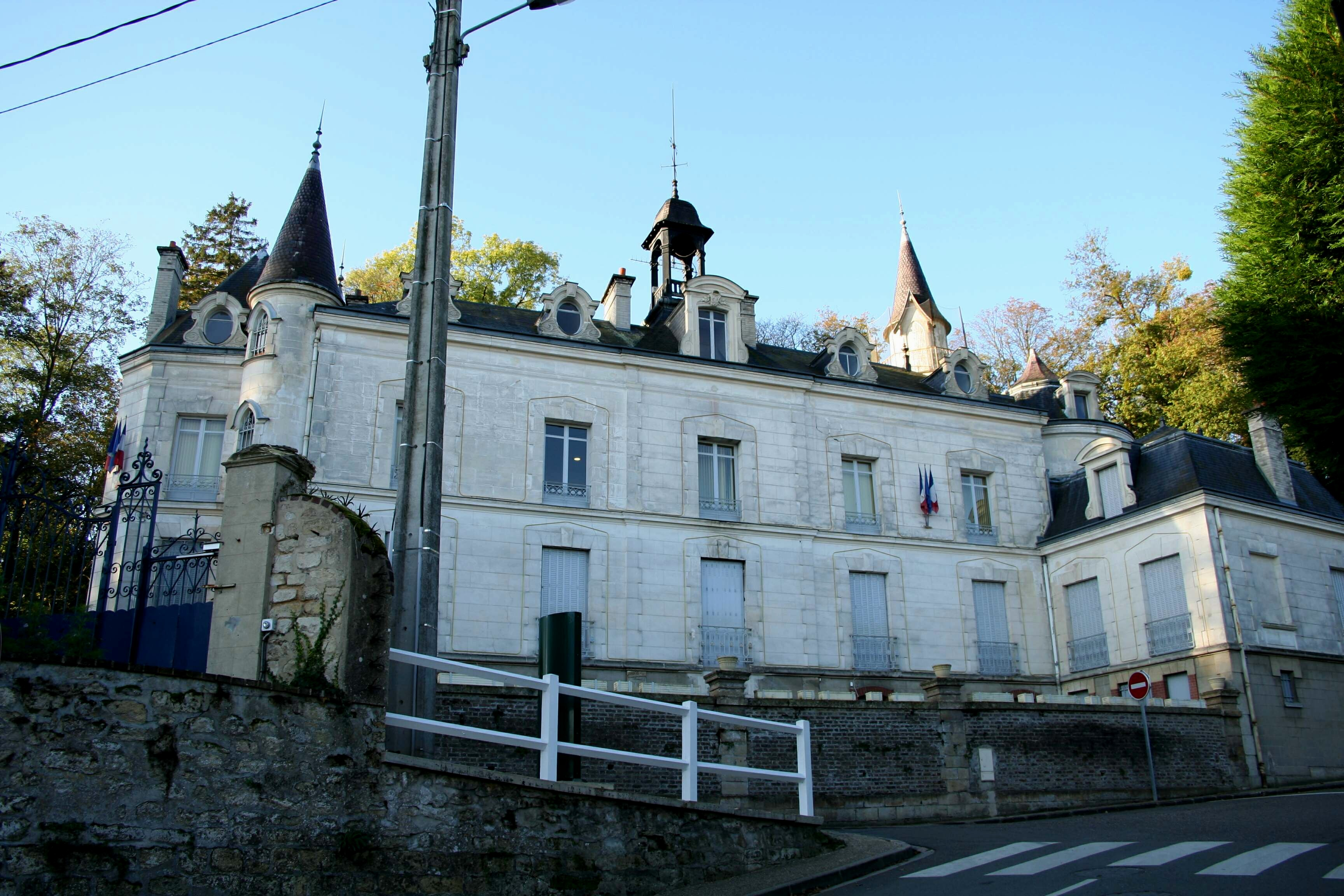
The Château des Tourelles, in Hardricourt (then in Seine-et-Oise, now in Yvelines), where Lycée Molière was temporarily relocated during World War II.

At the onset of World War II, the lycée’s facilities were repurposed, with the canteen converted into classrooms. Due to proximity to potential bombing targets, the school was closed by ministerial order. The principal, Mlle. Lagarce, relocated the school to the Château des Tourelles in Hardricourt, near Meulan (then in Seine-et-Oise, now Yvelines), establishing a temporary coeducational lycée for 250 students from multiple schools. Despite limited space, the improvised school operated effectively, with students and teachers adapting to wartime conditions—including trench digging and food support for displaced civilians and soldiers.

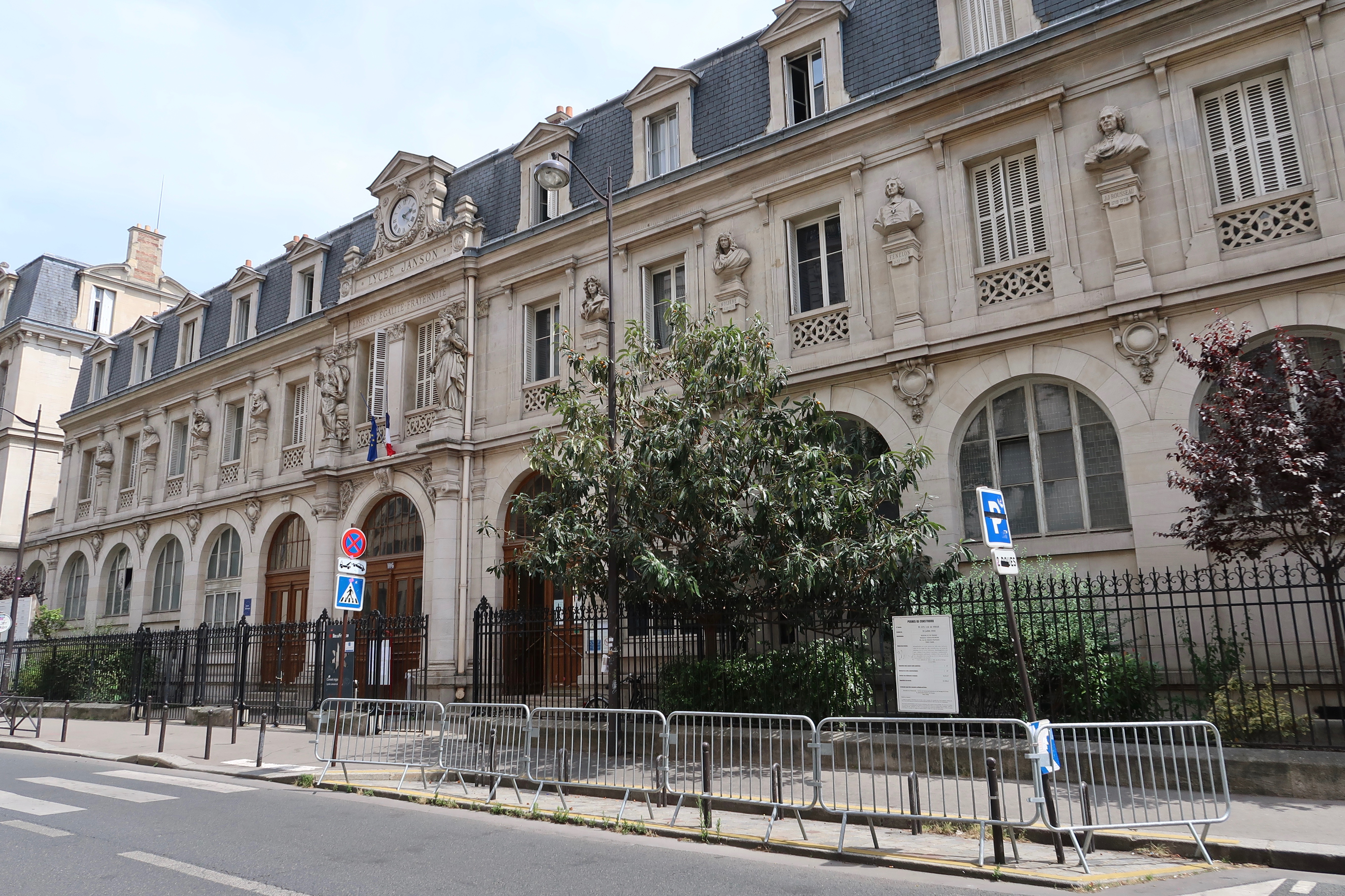
The Lycée Janson-de-Sailly, where some Lycée Molière classes were temporarily held during the war.

Meanwhile, the main building in Paris sustained bomb damage, and students temporarily joined the girls' lycée in Bordeaux. Classes eventually resumed at Lycée Molière in October 1940, with shared facilities at Lycée Janson-de-Sailly during holidays to avoid requisition. Wartime conditions were harsh: classrooms were unheated in winter, blackouts were imposed, and students began lessons in darkness due to the German-imposed time change. Air raids forced students and teachers to shelter in the building’s cellars, where some lessons continued. Despite the Occupation, acts of resistance emerged. On 11 November 1940, students participated in a forbidden demonstration at the Arc de Triomphe. During this period, Jewish students were gradually removed, as recounted by survivors.

A total of 42 students or alumnae died during the war, as commemorated by a plaque installed in 1947.) Victims included an ambulance driver, bombing casualties, eight resistance members, and 31 Jewish women deported and killed, including Erma Abelson. Others, like Brigitte Friang and Suzanne Grumbach, were arrested or deported. Alumnae and teachers such as Yvette Farnoux and Mme. Vacher also participated in resistance network. The memorial plaque was unveiled in a ceremony attended by Education Minister Marcel-Edmond Naegelen and senator Gilberte Brossolette.

=== Post-1945 ===
Lycée Molière Physical Education Program of 1962:

It consists of 2 hours per week, supplemented by 2 hours of outdoor activities at the Suchet Stadium, Boulevard Franchet d'Espérey. Outdoor activities can be replaced by:

In 6th and 5th grades: swimming at the Piscine Molitor, for three-quarters of an hour, on a rotating basis;

In 4th grade: ice skating. 10 students per class, selected by lottery, for 1 hour;

In 1st grade: equestrianism. 2 students per class, selected by lottery, for 1 hour.

Stadium - Students are excused from stadium activities only in very bad weather. In case of uncertain weather, they must go to the stadium and are escorted back to the Lycée under supervision if the session is canceled.

Furthermore, Madame la Directrice requests that we emphasize that since the afternoon stadium sessions begin at 2:10 PM, students should not arrive too early, given the proximity of the Bois de Boulogne and the presence of undesirable passersby who may disturb the students.

Following World War II, the Langevin-Wallon Plan initiated a reorganization of the French education system. Between 1952 and 1959, Lycée Molière hosted five pilot classes, leading to the implementation of educational reforms outlined by the 1959 decree, which introduced compulsory education until age 16 and distinguished between general and vocational tracks.

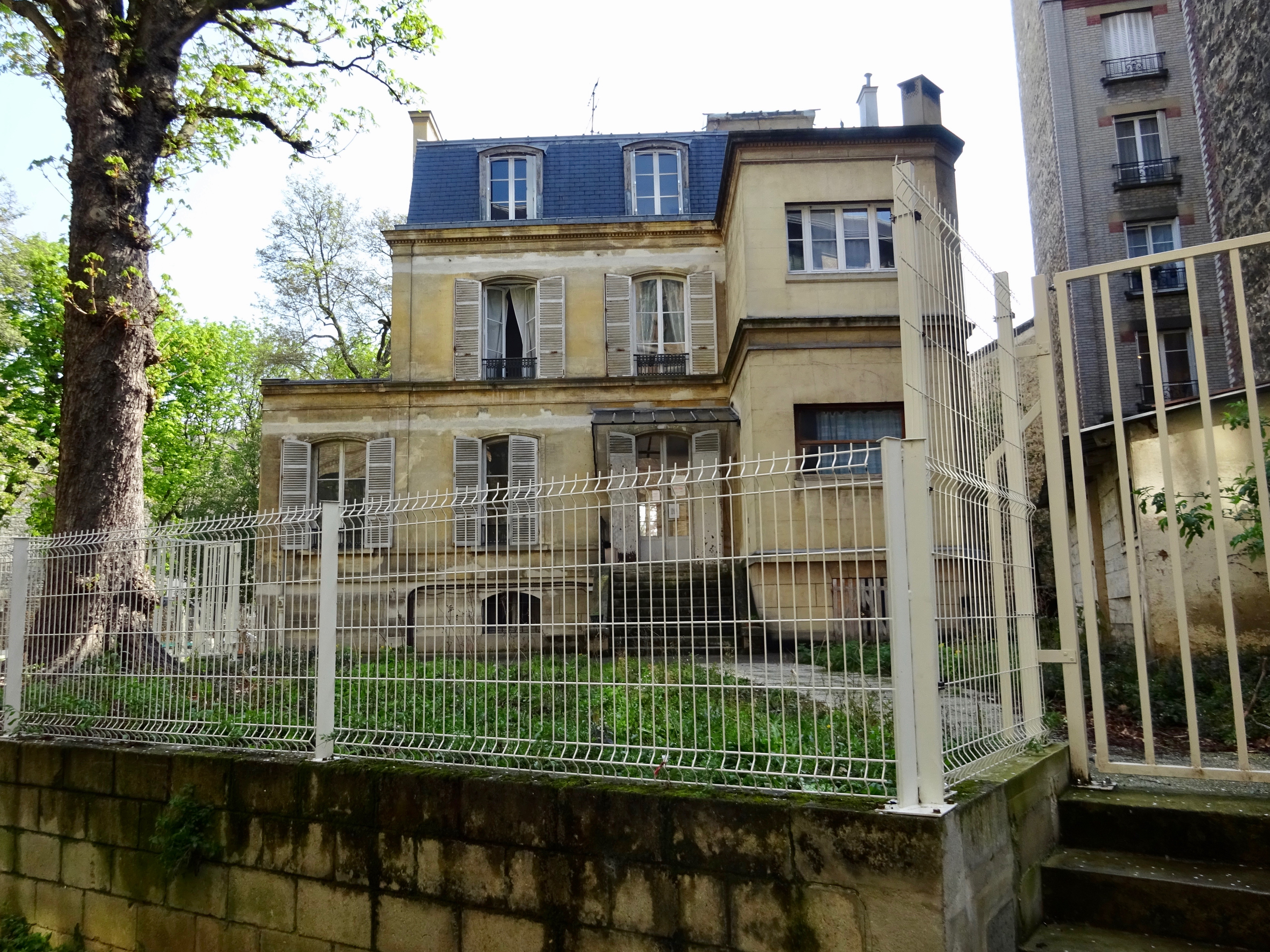
Pavilion located in the Hameau, purchased in 1954.

Significant renovations took place from the late 1940s: the principal’s office was relocated, adjacent to the courtyard of honor, a manual arts workshop was added (1946–47), and a second floor was constructed in two phases (1948–50), adding classrooms and facilities to accommodate a growing student body, which reached 1,685 students by 1950. Further expansion occurred in 1956 with the elevation of the wing along Rue de l'Assomption. Students dined at the Foyer des lycéennes on Rue du Docteur-Blanche to support preparatory students from outside Paris. In 1951, the lycée became one of only two institutions in France (alongside the Maison d'éducation de la Légion d'honneur) to offer domestic education teacher training, with adapted classrooms for this purpose. By 1953, the lycée hosted three literary preparatory classes aimed at admission to the École normale supérieure de jeunes filles in Sèvres.

The lycée acquired additional space in 1954, incorporating a nearby pavilion known as the "Hameau," expanded further in 1962. A planned annex on Place Rodin, acquired in 1956, was never developed. The return of Pieds-Noirs from Algeria around 1962 led to a further surge in enrollment and the use of prefabricated classrooms. By 1968, the student population had grown to 1,964 students across 65 classes. During the events of May 68, students participated in debates—mainly at Lycée Janson-de-Sailly—but Lycée Molière was not occupied. The decade saw the gradual elimination of traditional honors and uniforms, with more student participation in governance through class councils. In 1968, boys were admitted to preparatory classes, and in 1973, the lycée became fully coeducational. Academic offerings during the 1960s included sections A, B, C, M (mathematics, sciences, philosophy, and propaedeutic tracks).

In January 2007, a new commemorative plaque was installed to honor students deported during World War II who were under 18, adding names discovered through later research. The lycée partners with the Fondation pour la mémoire de la déportation and regularly enters students in the Concours national de la résistance et de la déportation, frequently earning departmental and national awards. It also participates in the "Relais de la Mémoire Juniors", an initiative led by former student and resistance survivor Yvette Farnoux and her husband, Abel Farnoux. On 13 April 2005, Jorge Sampaio, President of Portugal, visited the lycée. The school hosts regular cultural events, including a European Week in October 2008, and in early 2011, launched its school newspaper, Les Fourberies de Molière. On 15 December 2011, the lycée honored three former students who had received the Grand Cross of the Legion of Honour: Jacqueline de Romilly, Christiane Desroches Noblecourt, and Yvette Farnoux. The event included an exhibition, speeches, and a performance by the Paris Opera choir in tribute to deported students.

=== Celebrations ===
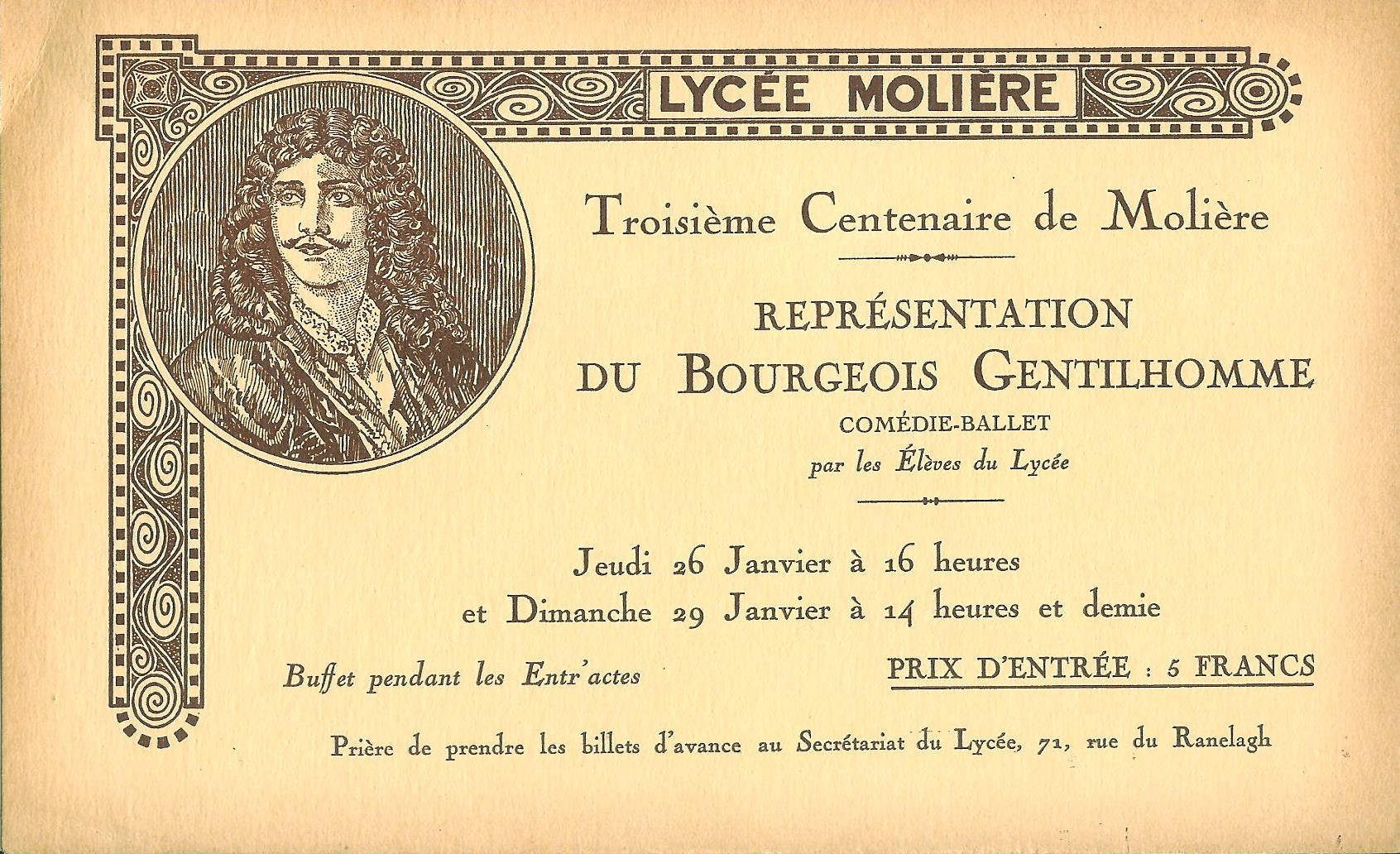
Invitation card for the celebration of Molière's tricentennial at the lycée in 1922.

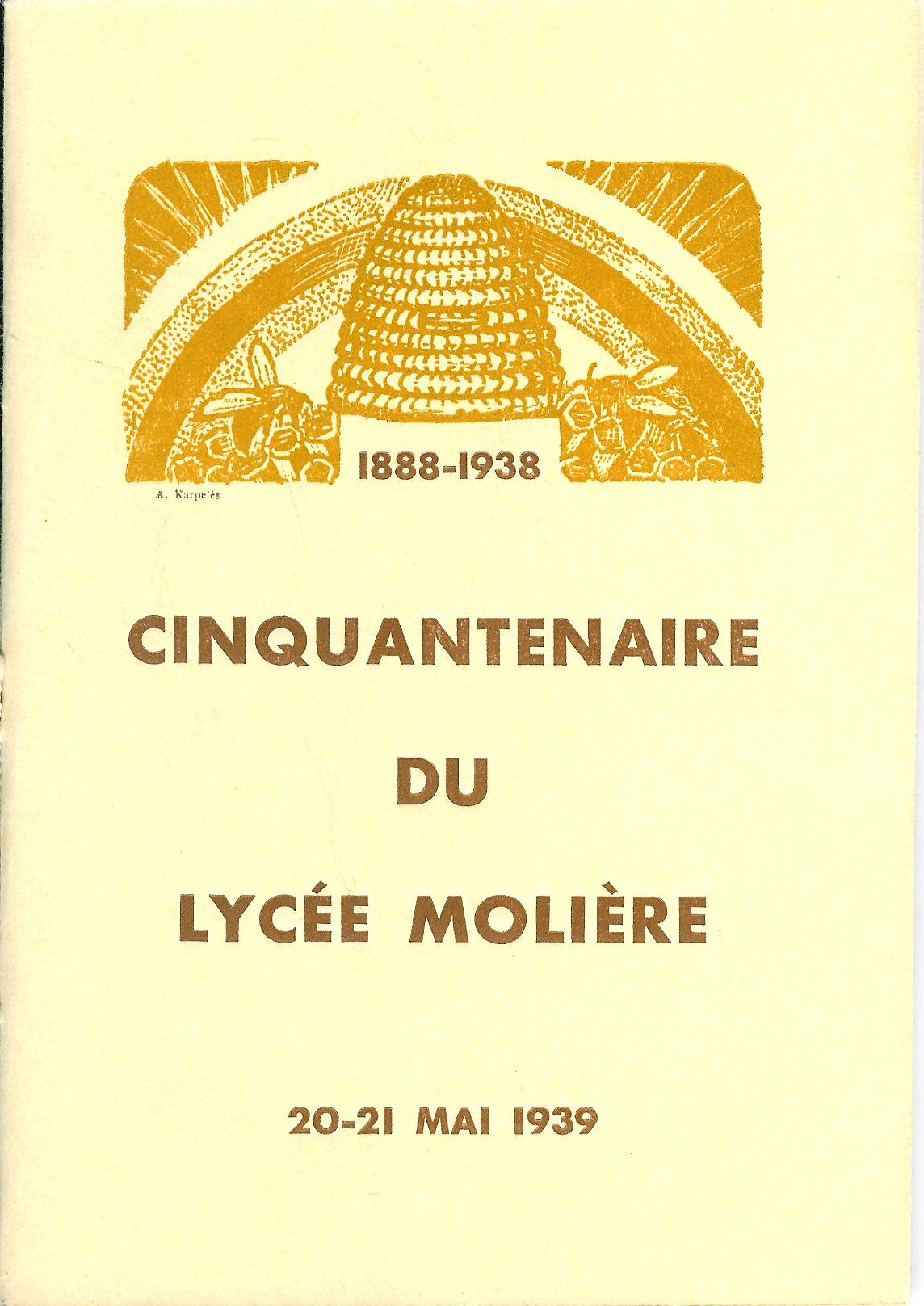
First page of the commemorative bulletin for Lycée Molière's fiftieth anniversary.

The anniversaries of the lycée have been regularly commemorated, often coinciding with significant historical moments: in 1913 for the 25th anniversary, on the eve of World War I; in 1938 for the 50th, shortly before World War II; and in 1968 for the 80th, during the events of May 68. The 25th anniversary, held on 12 October 1913, featured Camille Sée, author of the law on secondary education for girls. Mlle. Stoude recalled the lycée’s early challenges, noting the initial distrust of girls’ education and the dedication of the young teaching staff.

On 26 January 1922, the tricentennial of Molière’s birth was marked with a tea party and a performance of Le Bourgeois gentilhomme, accompanied by a poem written by French teacher Mlle. Dugard. The performance won First Prize from the Paris Academy.

The 50th anniversary in 1938 included a costume ball, attended by Jean Zay, Minister of National Education, and local officials. Former students and principals also returned for the occasion. Events included a basketball game, physical education demonstrations, and exhibitions of student work, including one on 17th-century science featuring Pascal and Gassendi. The celebration was mentioned on the radio by former student Pauline Carton, and a banquet followed the next day.

Due to the May 1968 events, the 80th anniversary festivities were postponed to December. A charity sale was held, featuring dishware with scenes from Molière’s plays and the lycée’s history. French teacher Marie-Louise Rançon authored Femmes savantes II, the first brochure on the lycée’s history. Deputy Michel Habib-Deloncle was among the guests, and short performances were presented.

== Architecture ==
=== General architecture ===
Schematic plan of the Lycée Molière's ground floor. Top: gymnasium; left: theater; bottom left: parlor. Classrooms. Rooms reserved for administration and student life. In the Hameau: pavilion; in the playground: entrances to the cafeteria. Left: principal’s office; right: teachers’ lounge. Staircases.

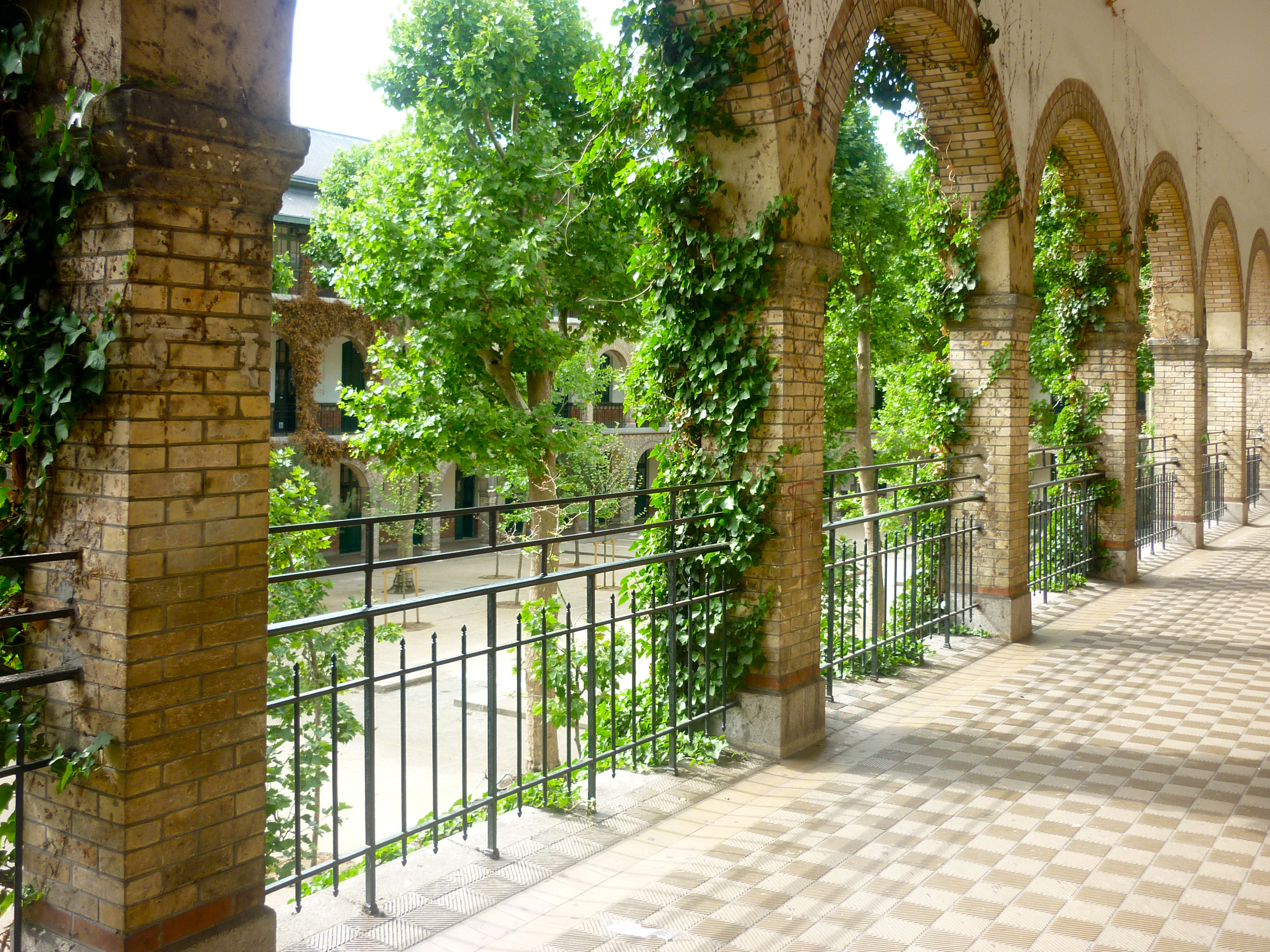
A corridor open to the playground, adorned with arcades, on the first floor.

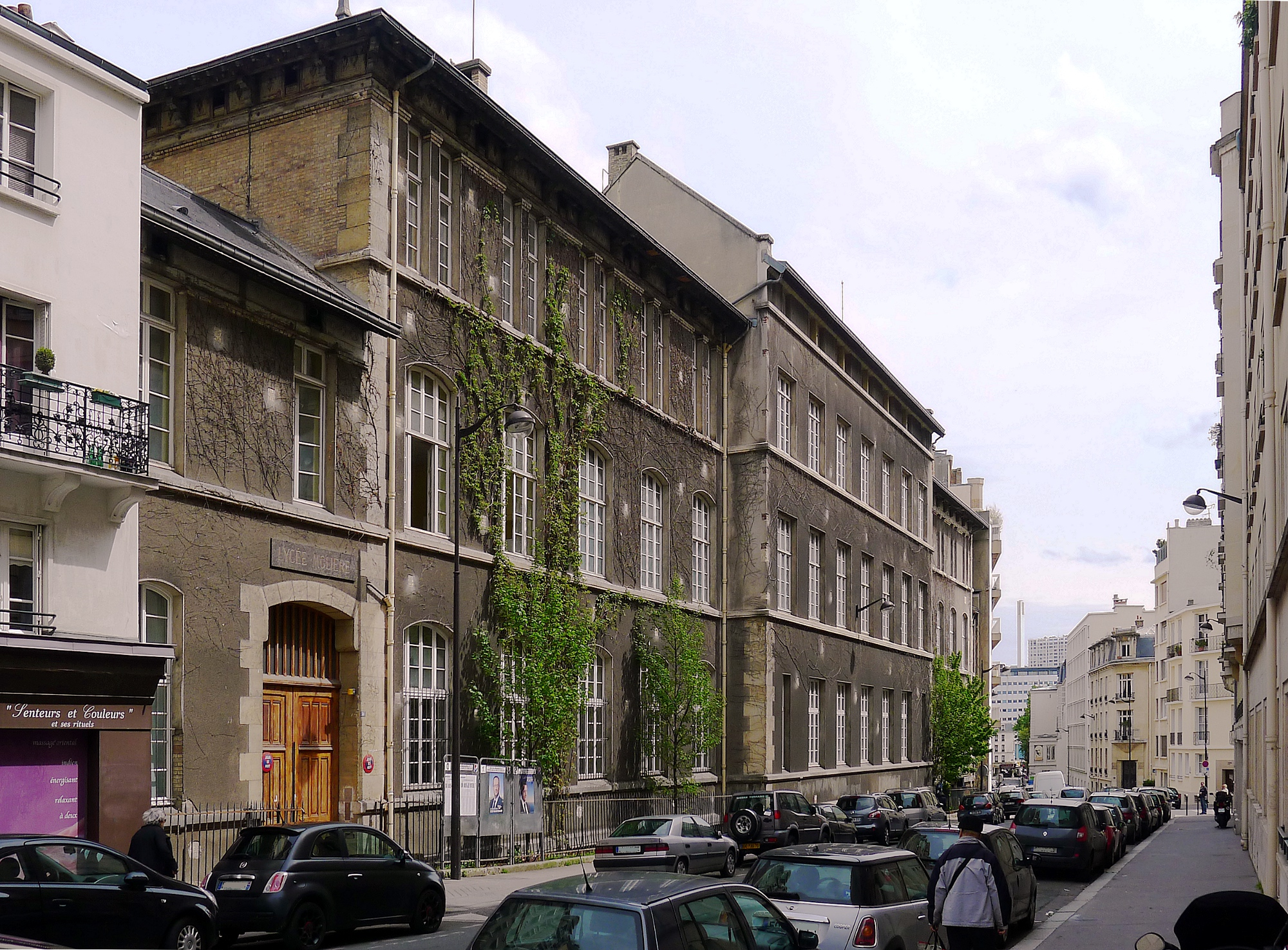
The Lycée Molière, from the rue de l’Assomption side.

Lycée Molière was built between 1886 and 1888 based on plans by architect Émile Vaudremer. It is a rectangular, two-story structure surrounding a forecourt (the courtyard of honor) and a large playground. Constructed in pink brick and cut stone, its design reflects the educational architecture of the early Third Republic, similar to institutions like Lycée Carnot (Paris) or the Lycée Georges-Clemenceau (Montpellier). While such monumental architecture was typically reserved for boys’ lycées, Molière’s imposing style led historian Marc Le Cœur to describe it as the most "masculine" of the girls’ lycées. The building features four large staircases and a U-shaped arcade gallery with wrought-iron balustrades overlooking the main courtyard. Classrooms face outward toward the building’s exterior. Originally built with a single floor, a second was added in the late 1940s.

On the ground floor are the student life offices for both collège and lycée, a gymnasium (facing Rue de l’Assomption), a study hall, and classrooms. Surrounding the courtyard of honor are the teachers’ lounge, administrative offices, the theater, and the "Salle des Actes." In the basement are the cafeteria and the documentation and information center (CDI), which opens onto the Hameau.

Cafeteria: Initially located beside the courtyard of honor, the cafeteria later occupied converted classrooms and became a multipurpose space, then a library. Students once dined off-site, first at the Foyer des lycéennes on Rue du Docteur-Blanche, and after World War II, in Boulogne. The current cafeteria was built in the early 2000s. The lycée’s upper floors and the Hameau also include administrative apartments.

Library: During the first half of the 20th century, the library operated irregularly, staffed by volunteer alumnae and stocked through donations. After World War II, it moved to a former sewing room, then to the former cafeteria space ("18 ter") in the 1970s under the name L’Heure joyeuse, eventually housing 12,000 volumes. It is now located at garden level in the Hameau and named CDI Jacqueline-de-Romilly, inaugurated in 1993 by the former student and Hellenist, who donated books from her personal collection,

The "Salle des Actes": Formerly the parlor, this room now serves ceremonial functions. It contains a carved fireplace depicting Molière, pianos, old books, and busts of actors. Exhibitions and class councils are held there.

The Hameau: This is a garden and pavilion acquired in 1954 and 1962, formerly part of the "Hameau de Boulainvillier" residence. It has hosted classes in prefabricated buildings and includes a park and a sports field.

The Theater: Originally a small venue in the event hall, the theater was later relocated to a former sewing room and renovated in 2012.

==== Courtyards and gardens ====
The courtyard of honor is a landscaped garden centered around a small fountain. Once adorned with rosebushes and Italian poplars, it now features Ginkgo biloba trees and is not accessible to students. It is separated from the main playground by glass doors and pavilions, one of which houses the principal’s office. The playground reflects the former tripartite division of student levels, once marked by shrubs and now visible through subtle changes in elevation. Originally planted with 40 plane trees, it has been partially replanted. Four old standpipes remain as reminders of the site's connection to the Passy aquifers.

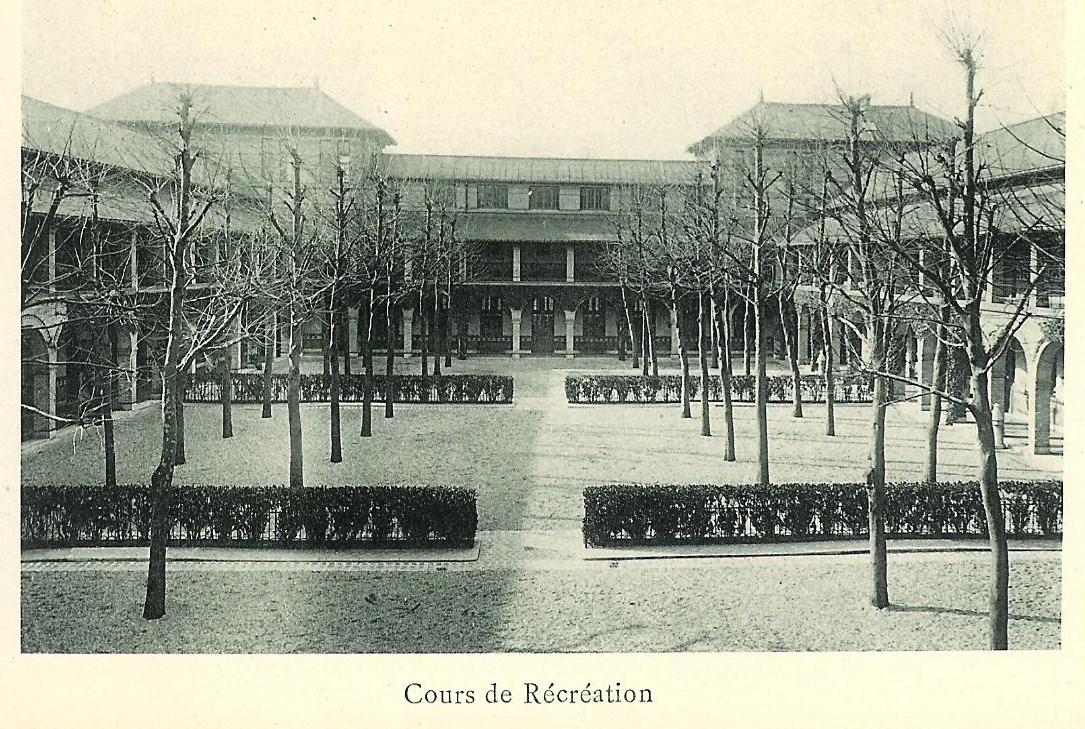
The playground, at the end of the 19th century.

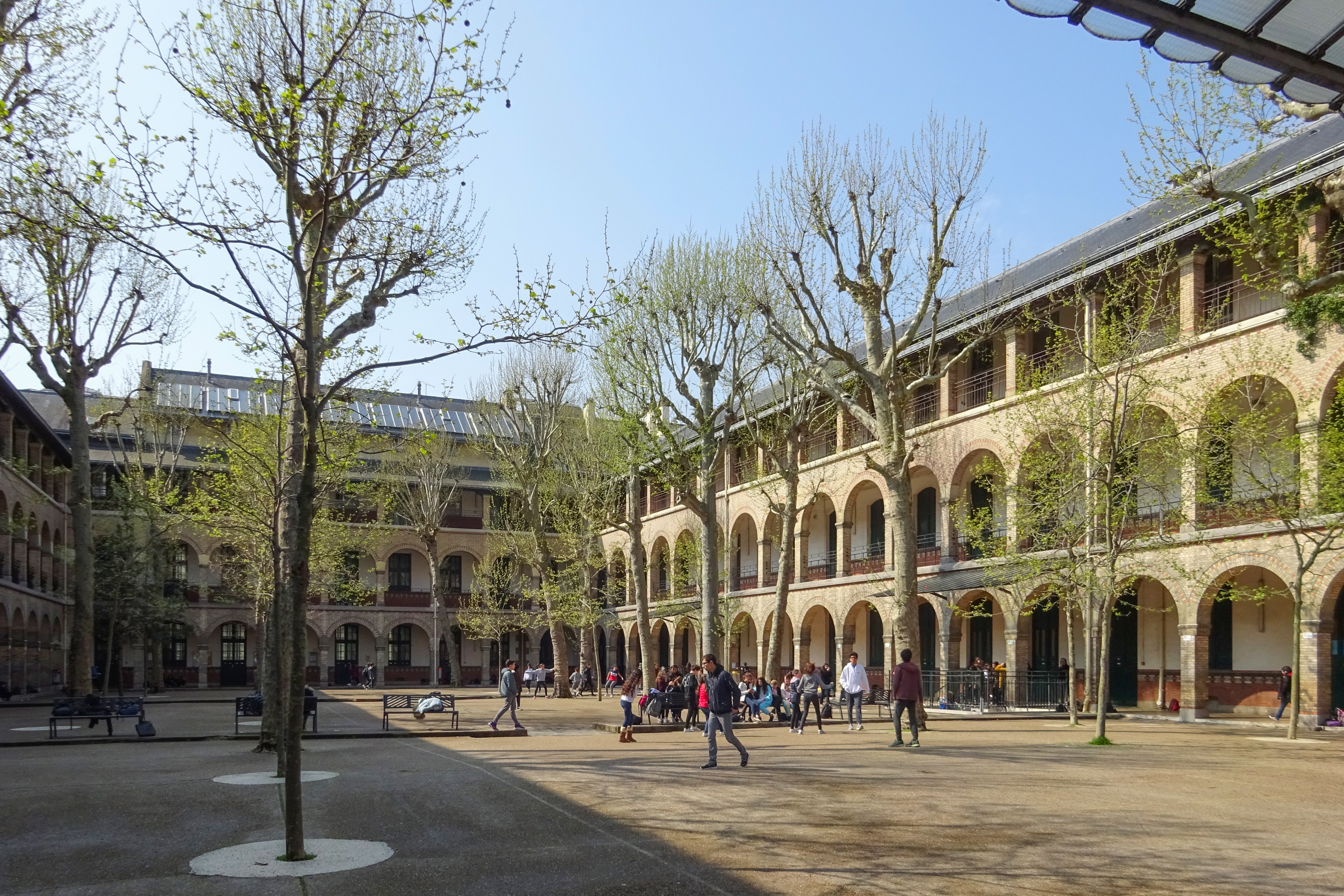
The playground, in the late 2010s.

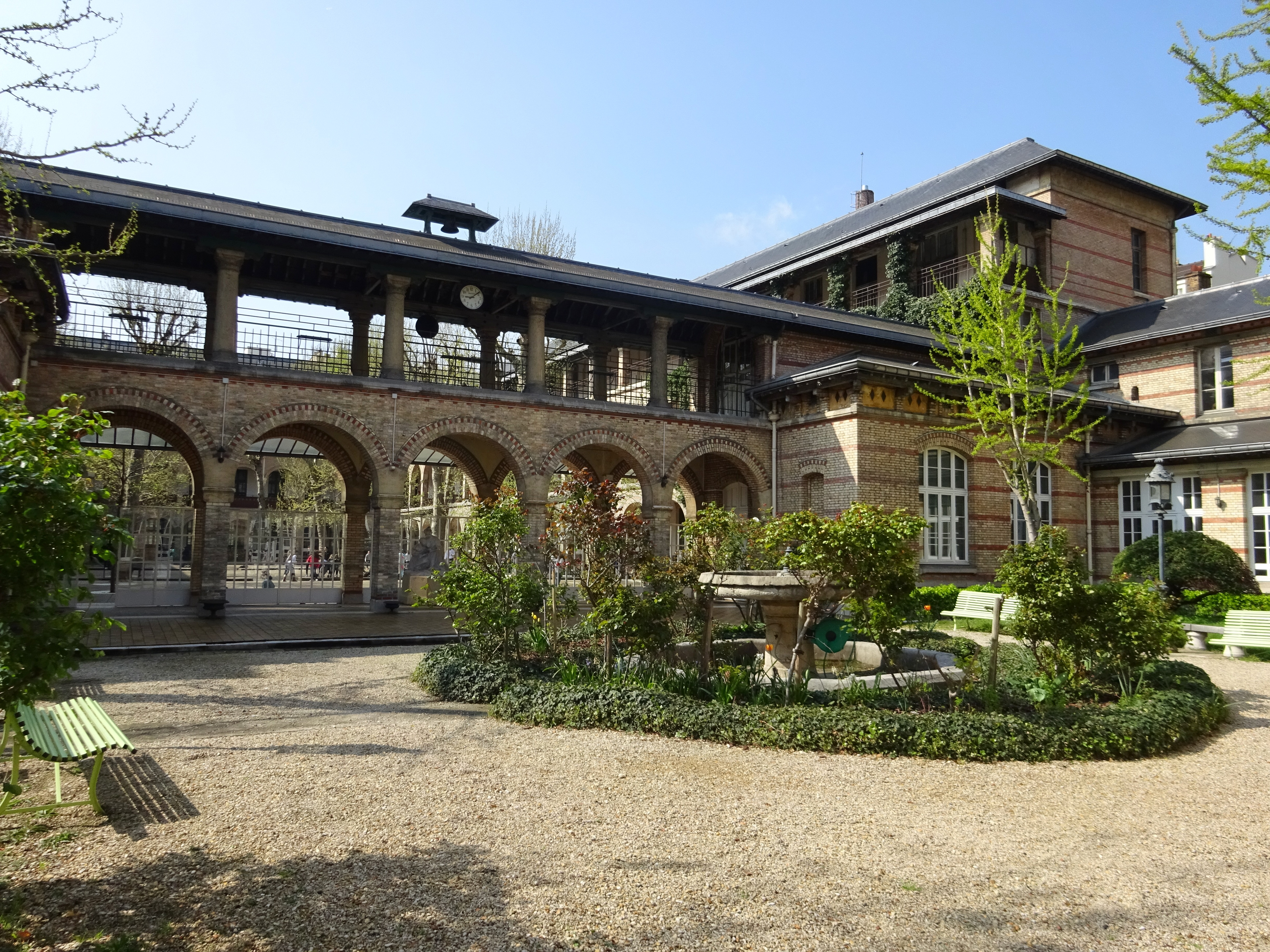
The courtyard of honor, in the late 2010s.

=== Architectural elements ===
A bust of Molière, donated by former students in 1904, stands in the main hall. It is a copy of Jean-Antoine Houdon's original sculpture at the Comédie-Française and was previously displayed in the theater and the "former students' room".

In the Salle des Actes (formerly the parlor), an ornate fireplace signed "Maniglier 1889" serves as a decorative focal point. The teachers' relaxation room features frescoes created in 1967, adjacent to their workroom.

A marble plaque, installed in 1947 near the hall, commemorates students who died during World War II—resistance fighters, Jewish deportees, and those killed in combat—with the inscription: In memory of the former students of Lycée Molière who died for France, 1939–1945. A smaller black plaque added in 2007 lists deported Jewish children. Another commemorative plaque is located outside, to the left of the entrance.

In the courtyard of honor stands La Leçon d’histoire naturelle, a statue by Blanche Moria, a teacher at the lycée and silver medalist at the 1924 Salon des artistes français. It was formerly placed in the hall.

The playground contains three historic standpipes, remnants of the original water system linked to the Passy aquifers.

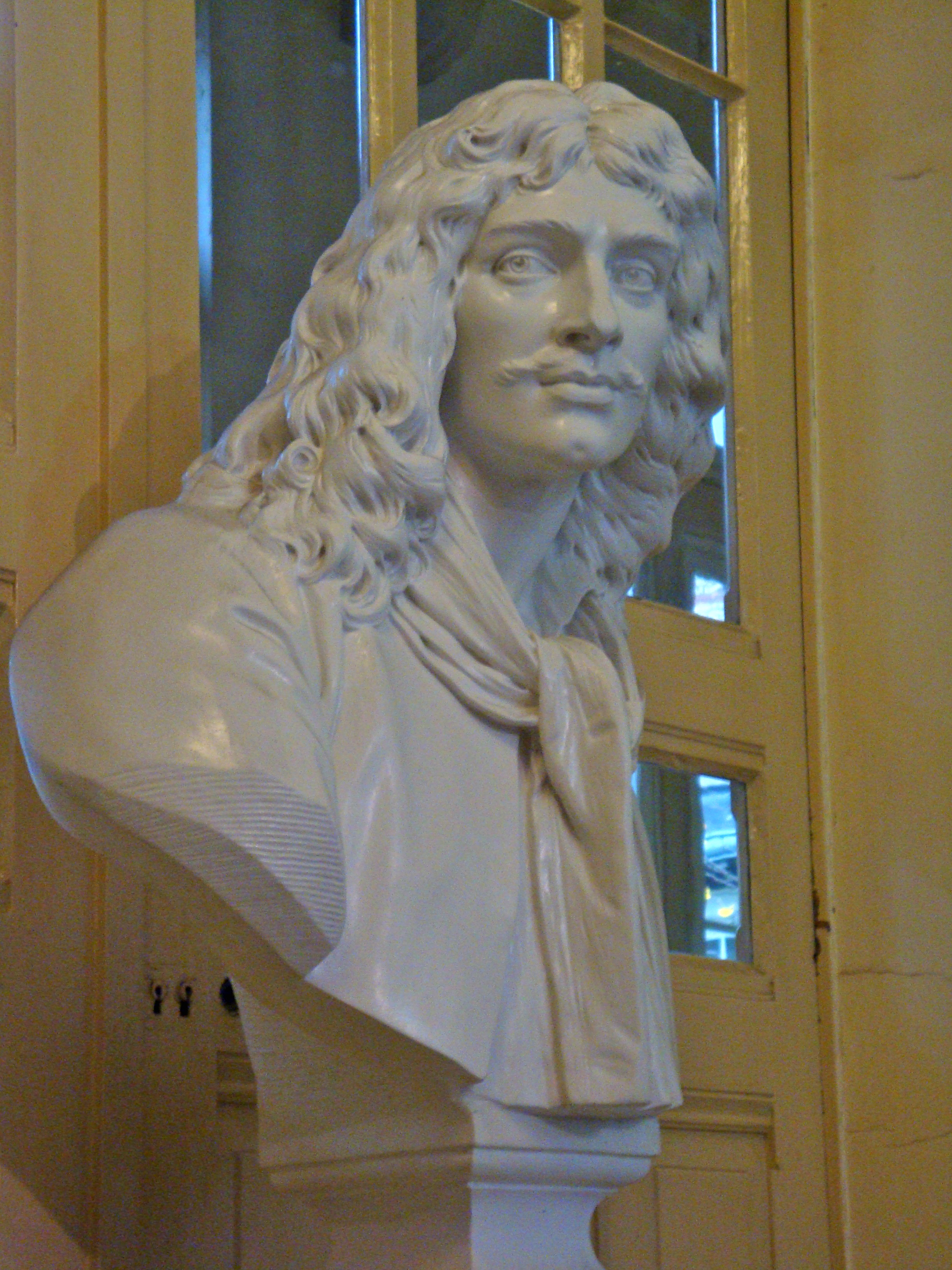
The bust of Molière, located in the hall.

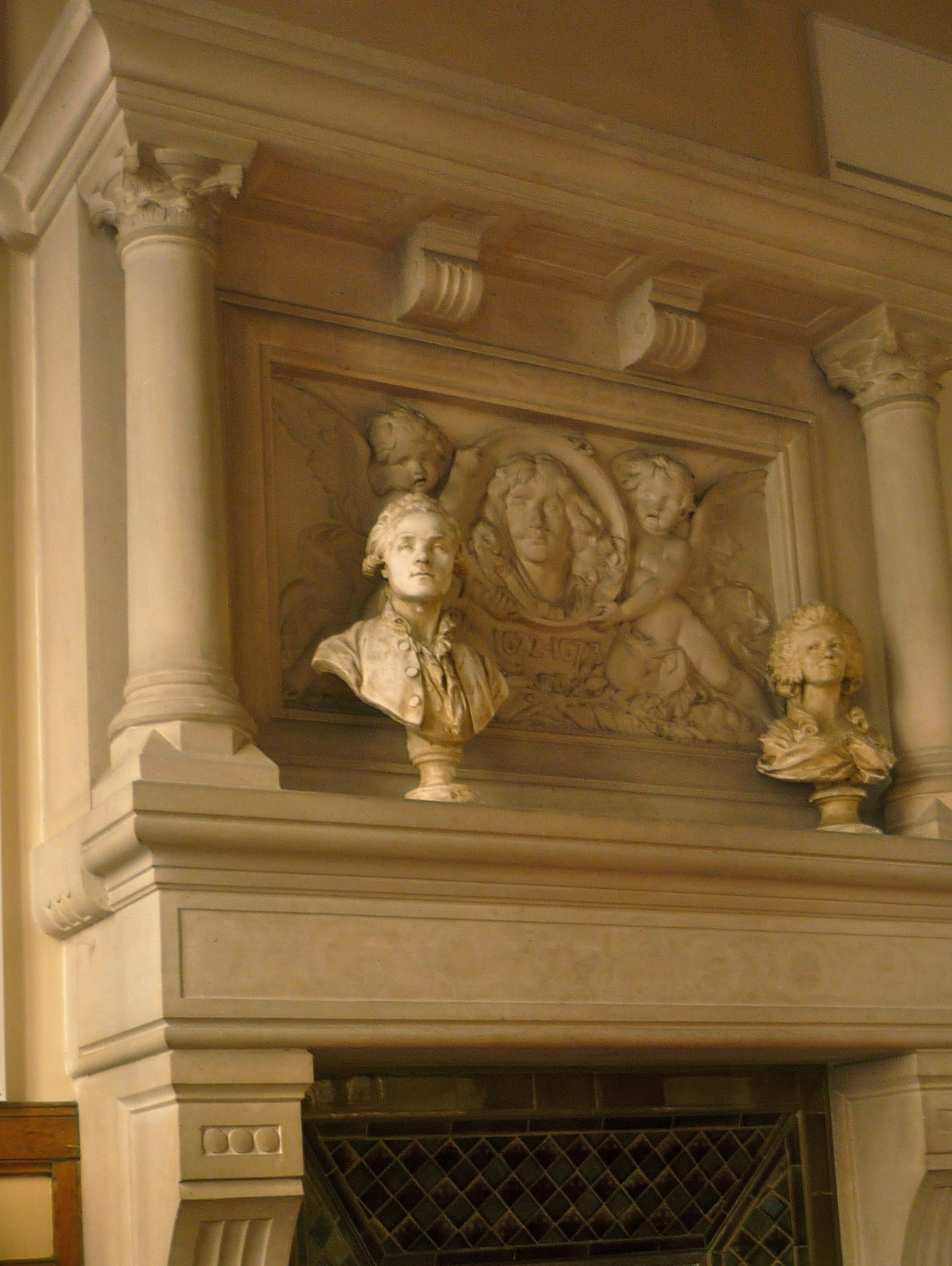
Details of the ornate fireplace in the Salle des Actes.

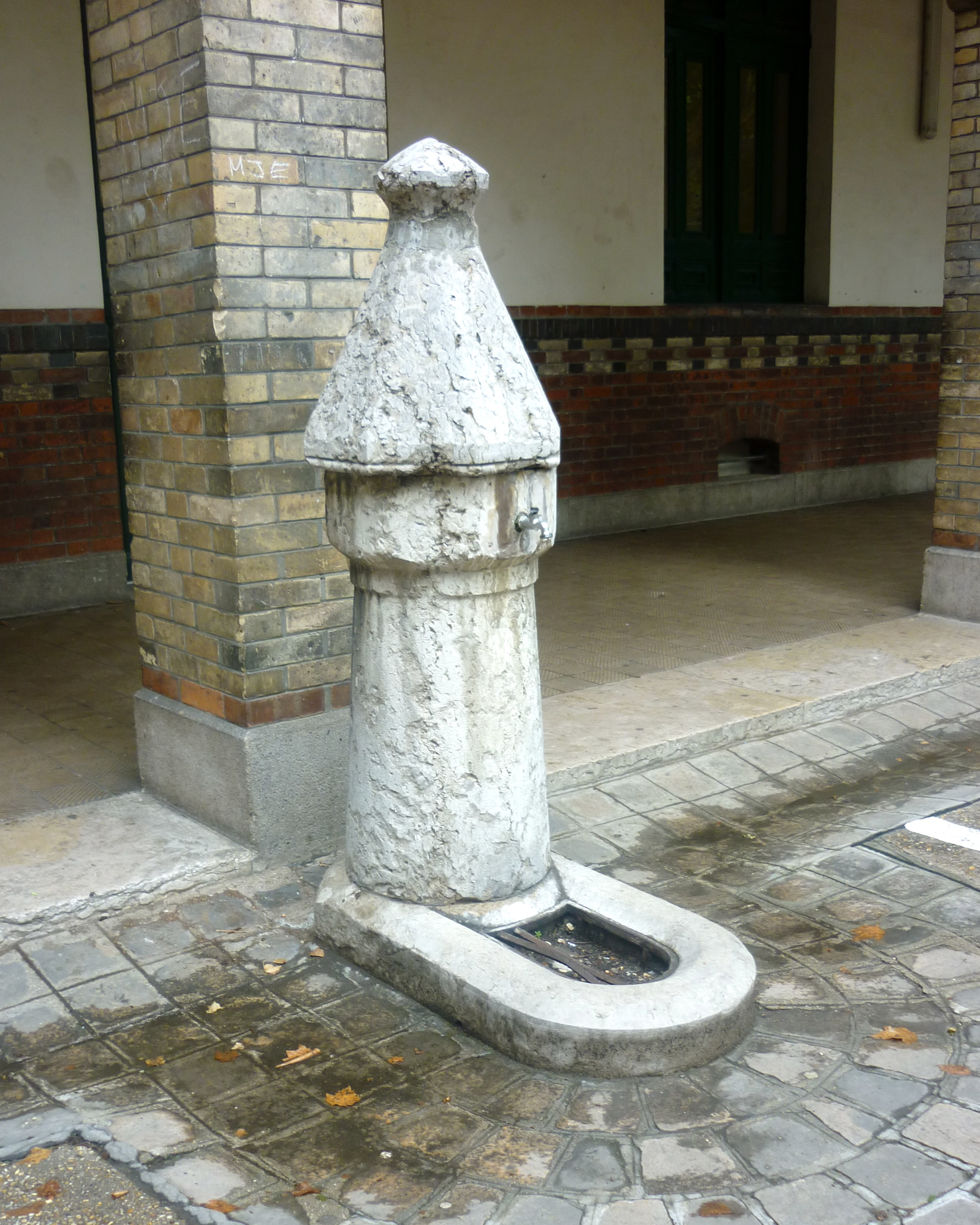
One of the three old standpipes in the playground.

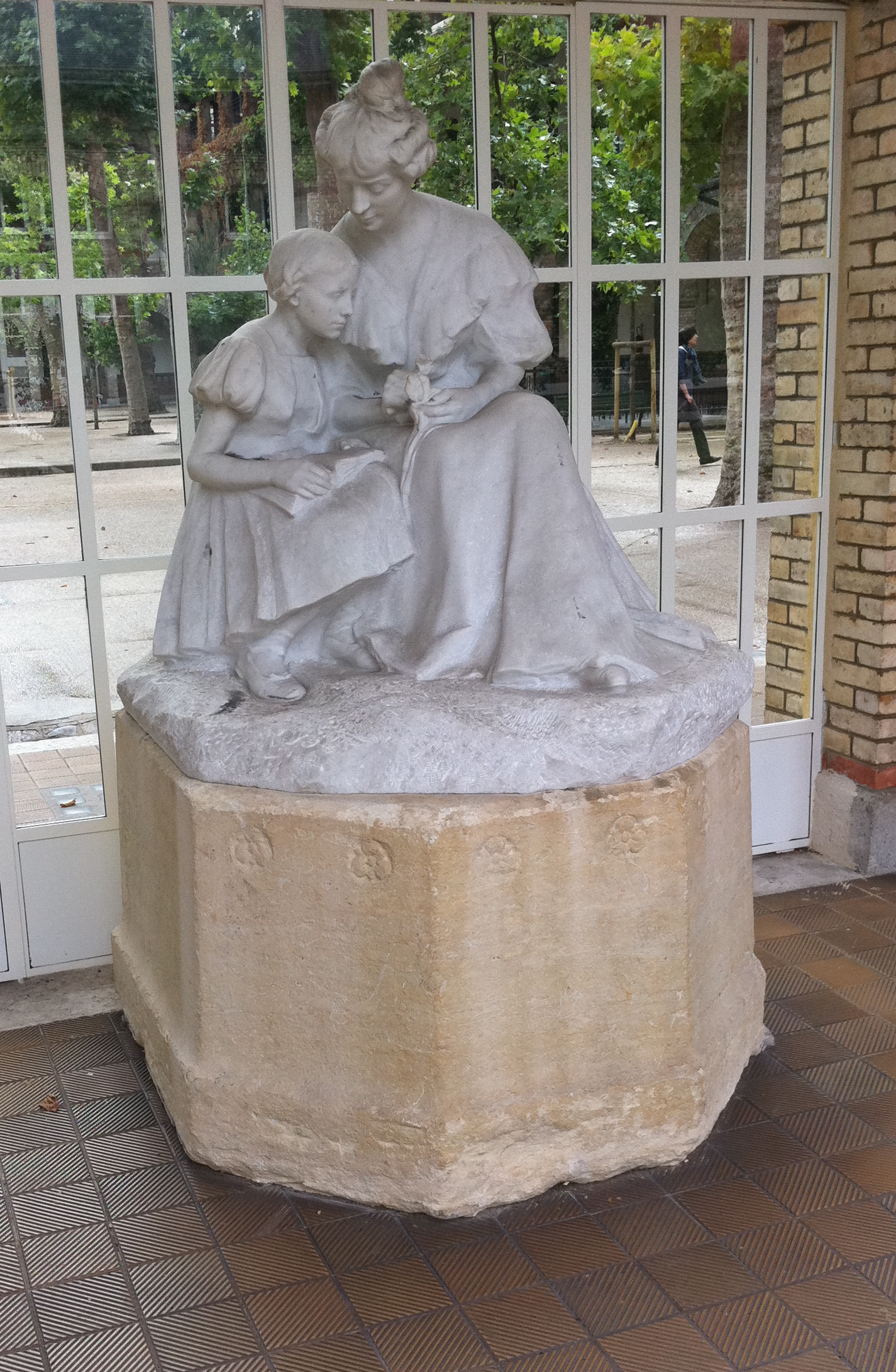
The statue La leçon d'histoire naturelle by Blanche Moria, in the courtyard of honor.

== Administration ==
The lycée was originally managed by a female principal; she was assisted by a deputy principal and a general supervisor. Since the educational reforms of the 1970s and 1980s, the school complex has been led by a proviseur, assisted by a deputy proviseur for the lycée and a deputy principal for the collège; four head educational advisors oversee student life.

List of Principals and Proviseurs
  - 1888: Henriette Stoude (married name Thirion upon departure; literature teacher);
  - 1919: Madeleine Plicque;
  - 1930: Mlle. Bordenave;
  - 1935: Mme. Albo;
  - 1938: Mlle. C. Lagarce;
  - 1952: Sultana Laubier (history teacher);
  - 1965: Yvonne Cordillot (English teacher);
  - 1970: Alice Kuntz (history teacher);
  - 1976: Annie Morel;
  - 1978: André Six (literature teacher);
  - 1992: Colette Monteil (literature teacher);
  - 1997: Pierre Santraud (mathematics teacher);
  - 2006: France Bessis-Favard (German teacher);
  - 2010: Ghislaine Lejarre;
  - 2014: Myriam Honnorat;
  - since 2023: Mr. Irankhah.

== Educational programs ==
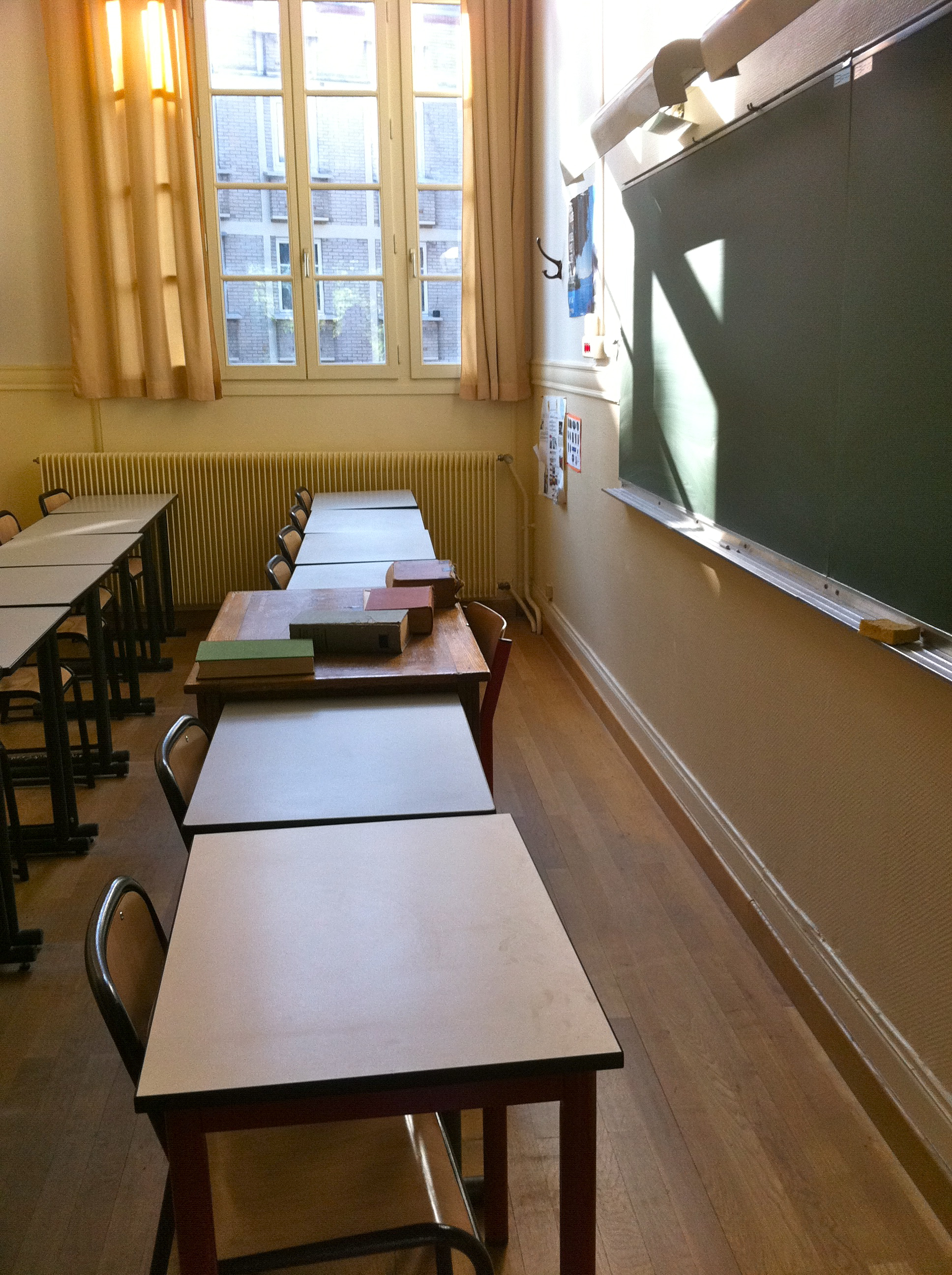
A classroom at the lycée.

Lycée Molière is officially designated as a cité scolaire, comprising a collège (under the Paris departmental authority), a lycée (under the Île-de-France regional authority), and preparatory classes (khâgne and hypokhâgne) for grandes écoles.

=== Collège ===
The subjects taught at the collège include mathematics, French, history-geography, SVT, physics-chemistry, technology, EPS, music, and visual arts. Among the two languages (LV1 and LV2) offered are English, Spanish, German, Italian, and Portuguese. Latin starting in 5th grade and Greek in 3rd grade are also offered to collège students.

=== Lycée ===
The subjects taught at the lycée include mathematics, French, history-geography, SVT, physics-chemistry, philosophy, EPS, and, depending on the streams, social and economic sciences and literature. Among the two languages (LV1 and LV2) offered are English, German, Spanish, Italian, and Portuguese; Persian is no longer taught. Second-year students can choose as options MPI (Physical Measurements and Computer Science) or SES (social and economic sciences). It is possible to take visual arts, theater, Ancient Greek, or Latin as options for the baccalauréat.

The lycée offers scientific, economic and social, and literary streams. A bilingual English class was established in 1974. Since the 1990s, this has been referred to as the European section in English, with additional sections in German, Spanish, and Portuguese. A language lab equipped with materials supports these courses, some of which are standard subjects taught in a foreign language (a DNL, or "non-linguistic discipline," such as physical sciences for second-year students in the English European section, for example). The lycée regularly conducts exchanges with foreign schools, notably in the past with those in Sutton (London), Cassel (Germany), San Francisco (United States), and Prague (Czech Republic), as well as linguistic and/or cultural school trips (e.g., in 2007, to Greece, Tunisia, Spain, and Germany).

==== Lycée Ranking ====
In 2018, the lycée ranked 87th out of 108 at the departmental level in terms of teaching quality, and 1,443rd out of 2277 at the national level according to the magazine L'Express.

=== Preparatory Classes for Grandes Écoles ===
Preparatory classes began informally in 1914, formalizing in the 1920s along the model of boys’ lycées.

The subjects taught in literary preparatory classes vary by year. In the first year (hypokhâgne), courses include philosophy, French, history, geography, an ancient language (Ancient Greek or Latin), and ancient culture. Students can study one or two languages depending on their options, among English, German, Spanish, and Portuguese. There is a theater option. In the second year (khâgne), courses are designed to prepare for the ENS rue d'Ulm; the competition options offered are classical literature, modern literature, philosophy, English, Portuguese, and theater.

CPGE students are simultaneously enrolled at a partner university (usually in English, German, history, or literature). At the end of each academic year, a class council determines whether students receive the 60 ECTS credits corresponding to their university year. Those not continuing to khâgne may transfer directly to university for their second year. The program includes academic conferences throughout the year.

==== CPGE Rankings ====
The national ranking of preparatory classes for grandes écoles (CPGE) is based on the admission rate of students to grandes écoles.

In 2015, L'Étudiant provided the following ranking for the 2014 competitions:

Stream	Students Admitted to a Grande École	Admission Rate	Average Rate Over 5 Years	National Ranking	Change Over One Year
Khâgne	3 / 44 students	7 %	11,4 %	11th over 41	=
Source: 2018 Preparatory Classes Ranking - L'Étudiant (2017 competitions). * The admission rate depends on the grandes écoles included in the study. In khâgne, these are 5 business schools (HEC, ESSEC, ESCP Europe, EM Lyon, EDHEC), ENSAE, ENC, and 3 ENS selected by L'Étudiant.

=== Theatrical tradition ===
Since 1983, Lycée Molière has offered an optional course in theater and dramatic expression, with an increased number of hours from 1987. The lycée maintains a long-standing partnership with the Théâtre de la Ville (formerly with the Théâtre de Chaillot). Several notable actresses, including Marion Cotillard and Charlotte Gainsbourg, are among the alumni of its theater section.

Following the events of May 1968, literature teacher Madeleine Bertrand promoted the development of theater at the lycée, first by expanding its place within language instruction, then by establishing a theater club. This initiative was led successively by Agnès Junger, Régine Keller (from 1974), and Yves Steinmetz. The administration supported these efforts by funding costume and set production. National newspapers such as L'Éducation and Le Monde highlighted the lycée as a model for integrating theater into secondary education. Year-end performances included: On ne badine pas avec l'amour by Alfred de Musset in 1980, George Dandin by Molière in 1983, Romeo and Juliet by William Shakespeare in 1987, Un chapeau de paille d'Italie by Eugène Labiche in 2006, and Les Caprices de Marianne by Alfred de Musset in 2011. Renowned director Antoine Vitez served as a patron of the theater section. On 19 December 2011, students from Lycée Molière and Lycée Abbé-Grégoire performed Romeo and Juliet at the Théâtre de l'Odéon, under the direction of Alain Sachs.

== Organizations ==
=== Alumni Association ===
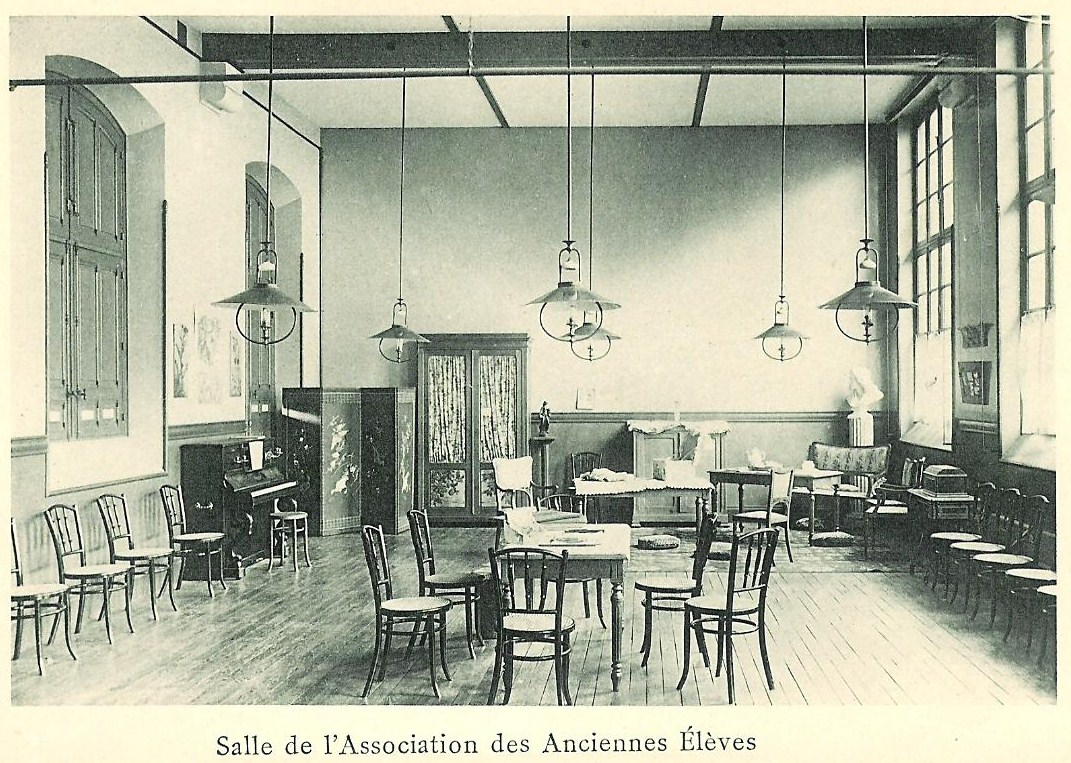
The room of the Lycée Molière Alumni Association at the end of the 19th century. At the back right, the bust of Molière, now located in the main hall.

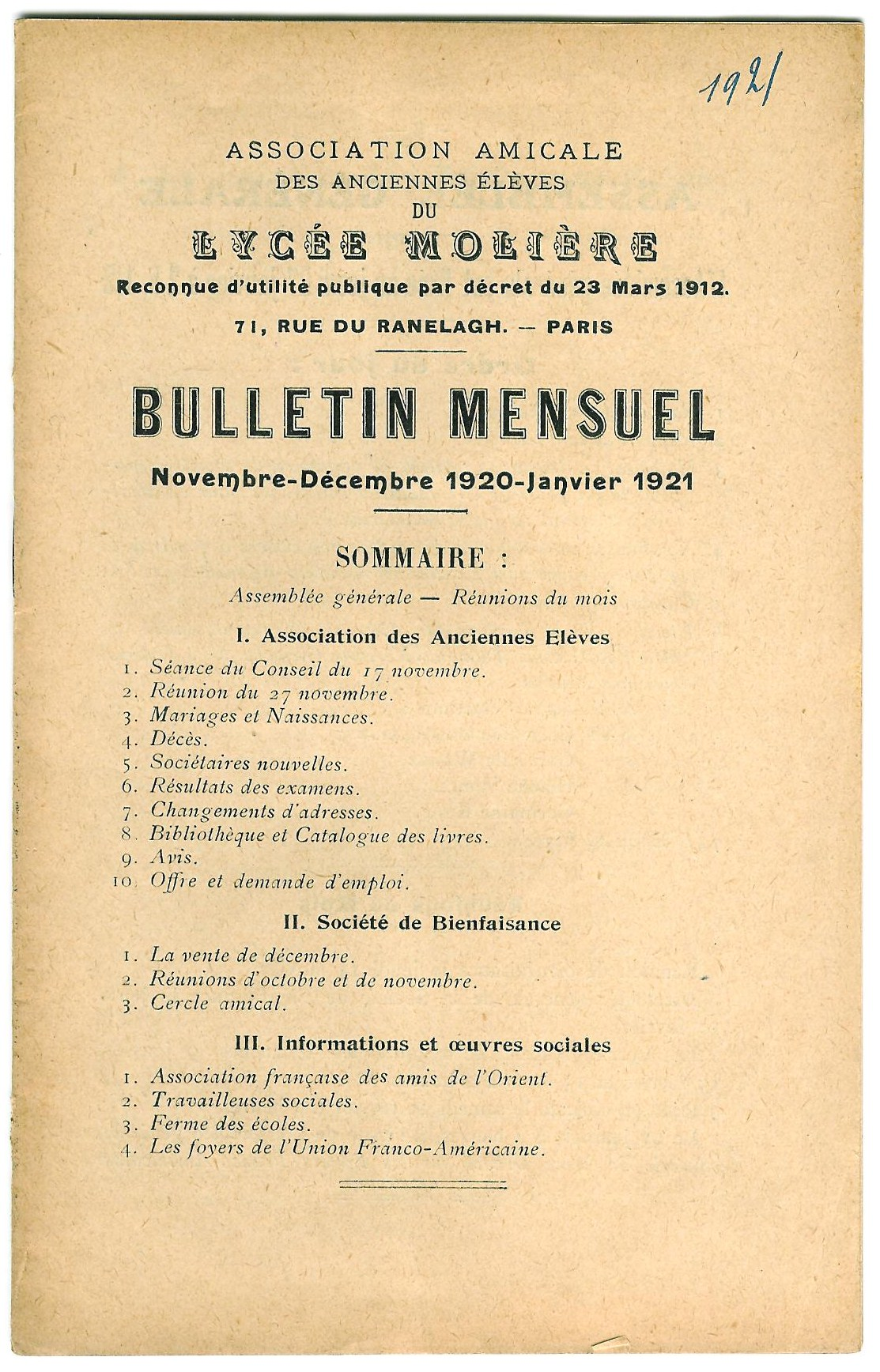
First page of the Lycée Molière Alumni Association bulletin from November-December 1920 and January 1921.

The Alumni Association, to which "alumni" was added in the 1980s (although coeducation was introduced in 1973), was founded in 1899 by Mlle. Stoude, the lycée's principal. It operates under the 1901 French law on associations and was recognized as a public utility by decree on 23 March 1912; it was also approved as a charitable organization by decision of the High Council for Public Assistance on 20 November 1927. The first president was Andrée Belin (married name Delzant); among her successors were Andrée Karpèles from 1912 to 1917, Renée Bergman until 1920, Hélène Mathieu-Weil, Berthe Milliard, a history agrégée (who contributed to the creation of the Union of Alumni Associations of Lycées and Collèges), Madeleine Plicque (former principal), and Mlle. Valério until World War II. The war temporarily put the association on hold, except for a few meetings; Marguerite-Marie Chalufour, president from 1946 to 1969, worked to unveil the memorial plaque in 1947, create a general alumni directory in 1951 (the previous one dated from 1938), and publish new statutes for the association in 1962. The statutes were amended again in 1982 and 1983, with the association taking the name "Association amicale des anciens et anciennes élèves du lycée Molière". Subsequent presidents were Paule Duret (mathematics teacher), Christiane Pibouin from the early 1990s, and, since 2001, Anne-Marie Poutiers (SVT teacher). Its goals are to maintain connections among alumni, provide moral and financial support to members and their families, and contribute to school life through scholarships and awards. Up to one-tenth of its annual resources may be used to support students. A council of fifteen members manages the association, which has been part of the Union of Alumni Associations of French Lycées and Collèges since 1902.

Originally housed in a dedicated room with a small library, the association lost its space as the school expanded, meeting instead in the event hall. Today, it occupies only three cabinets in a hallway.

From its inception, the association supported social initiatives such as distributing scholarships, organizing student vacations, aiding war victims, and hosting lectures. During World War I, it also helped place war orphans and supported the creation of a student residence (Maison des lycéennes) on Rue Amyot.

In 1904, members donated the bust of Molière now located in the main hall. They also founded language clubs in English and German. In the postwar period, as charitable activity declined, the association focused on commemorating students deported or killed during World War II, granting scholarships and prizes, and publishing an annual bulletin. The bulletin includes reports from the general assembly, alumni news, exam results, and personal accounts.

=== Catholic chaplaincy ===
Due to strict enforcement of secularism in public schools, a formal chaplaincy was not initially allowed at the lycée. Nonetheless, Mlle. Stoude organized catechism lessons for Catholic students and accompanied them to nearby Église Notre-Dame-de-l’Assomption de Passy. Religious observances were informally respected, such as students wearing Scout uniforms or First Communion dresses on special occasions. A formal Catholic chaplaincy was established in 1946. It has since had several locations and continues to offer spiritual activities, pilgrimages, and holiday camps.

=== Clubs and activities ===
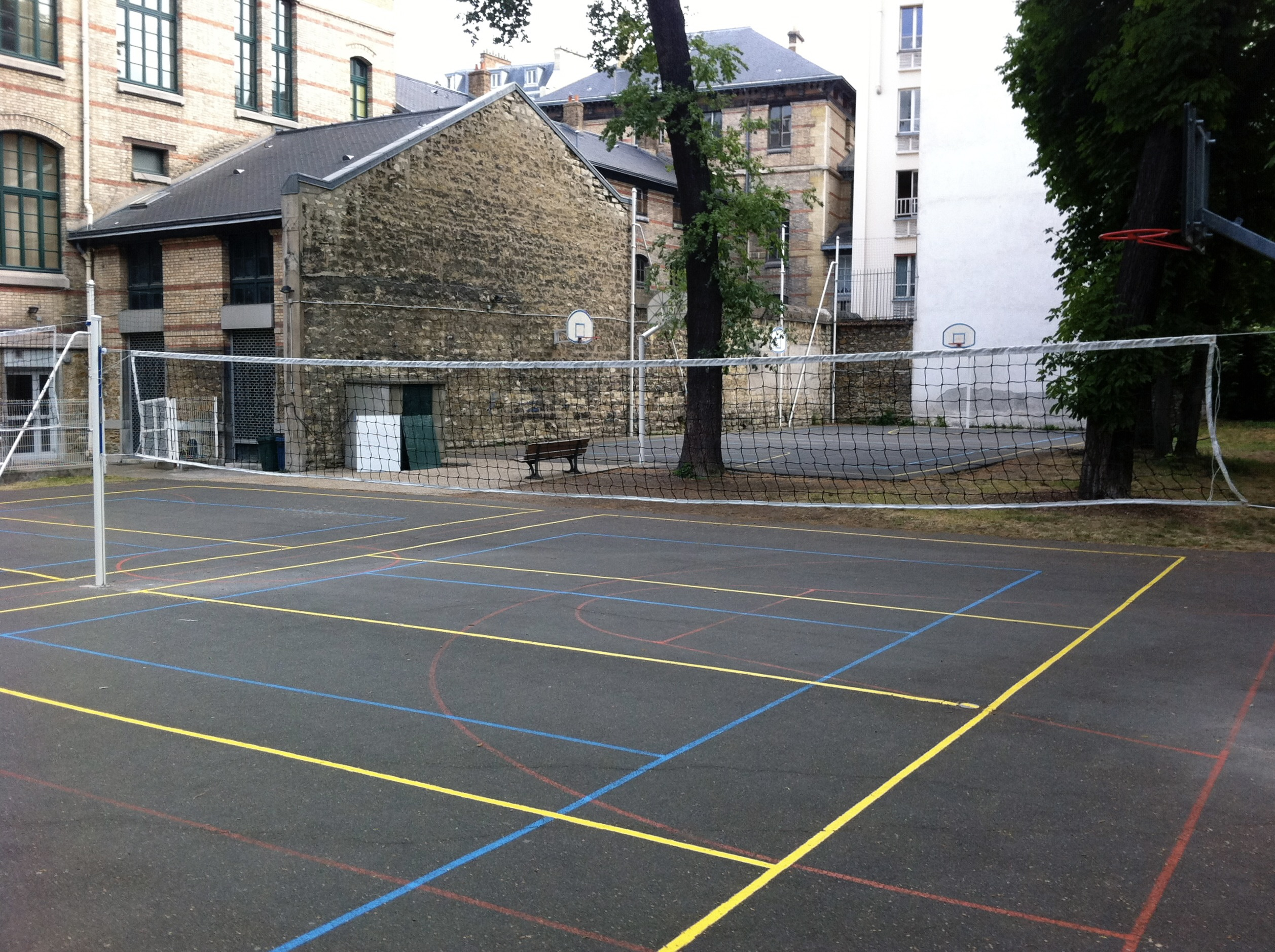
One of the sports fields located in the Hameau.

Since its founding, the lycée has offered a variety of extracurricular activities. Early on, students could join foreign language clubs, such as the English Club and Deutscher Verein. By the 1970s, additional clubs included theater, film, UNESCO,photography, classical dance, and music. A sports association has long been active. In the 1920s, partnerships with the Paris Université Club enabled students to practice basketball, swimming, rhythmic dance, and tennis. By 1962, the program had expanded to include gymnastics, athletics, handball, basketball, and volleyball, with other activities such as tennis, equestrianism, judo, and swimming available through external structures. A hockey club was active in the 1970s. Since the 2000s, basketball, volleyball, swimming, table tennis, modern dance, taekwondo, handball, climbing, and outdoor activities are the sports offered to students.

The lycée also maintains a tradition of festive events. An end-of-year celebration is held regularly, often featuring theatrical performances, games, costume contests, and musical activities. In 1950, for example, the festival included performances of Les Précieuses ridicules by Molière and Little Women in English. In past decades, the festivities sometimes included a ball and choir performances, and early in its history, a Christmas celebration was also organized.

== Student population ==
A constant in the lycée's student population is its diversity. As many Catholic students attended private confessional institutions, a significant number of Jewish students were noted from the lycée's founding. From 1917 and the October Revolution, daughters of White Russians, Orthodox Christians, were enrolled. Surveys around 1927 indicate a maximum of 22% foreign students. The significant increase in student numbers during the 1960s is explained by the "baby boom" and the return of Pieds-Noirs from Algeria and the French Sahara to mainland France starting in 1962. By 1980, around forty different nationalities were represented at the lycée, a fact corroborated by a survey conducted in the early 2000s.

Demographic evolution
1888	1896	1913	1914	1917	1918	1938	1939	1950
48	244	573	418	585	354	1 350	1 320	1 685

1951	1953	1956	1965	1968	1980	2010	-	-
1 676	2 000	2 300	2 548	1 964	1 583	1 360	-	-

== Notable figures ==
=== Teachers ===
The lycée counts among its former teachers notable figures such as Simone de Beauvoir (from 1936 to 1939; she was dismissed after starting a relationship with one of her students, Bianca Bienenfeld), Dina Dreyfus, and Nicolas Grimaldi (in the 1950s) for philosophy, Colette Audry for French, Geneviève Guitel for mathematics, Jeanne Gaillard for history (between 1950 and 1955, in première supérieure), Blanche Moria (until 1927) and Élise Rieuf (between 1937 and 1960) for visual arts, and even Gabriel Fauré as a choir rehearsal coach and Jeanne Chauvin as a teacher of "practical law" (an optional course; until 1926).

=== Students ===
Among the few women awarded the Grand Cross of the Legion of Honour, three were students at the lycée (Christiane Desroches Noblecourt, Yvette Farnoux, and Jacqueline de Romilly).

==== Before World War II ====
Before World War II, Lycée Molière enabled many young women to achieve emancipation through education. Some former students became political figures, such as feminists Louise Weiss and Yvonne Pellé-Douël or the future minister Françoise Giroud (then France Gourdji). However, most distinguished themselves in intellectual fields, such as historians Zoé Oldenbourg, Suzanne Citron (then Suzanne Grumbach, until 1939), and Clotilde Brière-Misme, Hellenist Jacqueline de Romilly (then Jacqueline David, between 1922 and 1931, while her mother, writer Jeanne Malvoisin, studied there from 1897 to 1904), archaeologists Marthe Oulié (1912–1915) and Jacqueline Pirenne, Egyptologist Christiane Desroches Noblecourt (then Christiane Desroches), archivist-paleographer Jeanne Bignami-Odier (then Jeanne Odier, between 1924 and 1925), philosophers Bianca Lamblin (then Bianca Bienenfeld) and Dina Dreyfus, and psychoanalyst Françoise Dolto (then Françoise Marette; 1924–1925).

Other former students excelled in the arts, particularly in cinema, such as actresses Pauline Carton, Clarisse Deudon, and sisters Jacqueline Audry and Colette Audry, the former a director and the latter a playwright. There were also painters, such as Madeleine Fié-Fieux, Andrée Karpèles, and Nadine Landowski, as well as a photographer, Denise Colomb (then Denise Lœb), and a cultural event organizer, Anne Heurgon-Desjardins (then Anne Desjardins). The bandleader Raymond Ventura, known as Ray Ventura, studied in the elementary classes, under exemptions allowing young boys with sisters at the institution.

During World War II, several former students distinguished themselves with courage in the Resistance, such as Yvette Farnoux (student under the name Yvette Baumann, until 1938), Marietta Martin, Simone Perl, and her sister Madeleine Lévy (deported to Auschwitz), granddaughters of Captain Alfred Dreyfus, Jacqueline Pery d'Alincourt (then Jacqueline de La Rochebrochard), physician Myriam David, an Auschwitz survivor, and Nicole Weil-Salon, a member of the Garel Network, who died at Auschwitz.

==== After World War II ====
After the war, the lycée counts among its former students political figures such as magistrate and regional councilor Claude du Granrut, former minister Corinne Lepage (student from 1961 to 1968), and diplomat Bérangère Quincy (then Bérangère Odier, until 1968), historians such as Colette Beaune, Françoise Waquet, and Marie-Hélène Zylberberg-Hocquard, journalists such as Marina Carrère d'Encausse, Constance Chaillet, Chantal Dupille, Frédérique Jourdaa, Geneviève Jurgensen (student from 1959 to 1964), and Annette Kahn, as well as writers such as Claire Gallois, Anna Gavalda (in hypokhâgne in 1990), Anne Goscinny, Fred Vargas (then Frédérique Audoin-Rouzeau, until 1974), and Diane Ducret.

Above all, a significant number of former students are found in cinema and theater, as evidenced by the tradition of teaching these disciplines at the lycée. Thus, in addition to post-war actresses up to the 1990s such as Françoise Arnoul, twin sisters Geneviève Brunet and Odile Mallet, Cristiana Reali, Catherine Salviat, and Marie Versini, there are a notable number of actresses and actors considered the "young" talents of French cinema, such as Marion Cotillard, Charlotte Gainsbourg, Nadia Tereszkiewicz, Blandine Bury, Léa Drucker, Alexandra Naoum, Lyes Salem, Anaïs Tellenne, Grégori Baquet, Yann Trégouët, Sebastian Roché, and Tilly Mandelbrot, former students. Others became directors, such as Valérie Girié and Anne Fontaine, or a stage director, such as Marc Paquien.

== Culture ==
- Several scenes of the film Kung-fu Master (1987) by Agnès Varda were filmed there.
- The early seasons of the television series Madame le Proviseur (1990s) were filmed there. For filming purposes, the signs indicating "Lycée Molière" and "rue du Ranelagh" were respectively changed to "Lycée Eugène Belgrand" and "rue Eugène Belgrand".
- The film La Belle Personne (2008), by Christophe Honoré, was filmed there.
- The promotional video for the nominees of the César 2011 was filmed there by actress and director Zoe Cassavetes
- The telefilm L'Homme de la situation (2011) by Didier Bivel was filmed there (Note: The episode was filmed at Lycée Molière during the 2011 All Saints' holidays and aired on TF1 on Monday, 9 April 2012.).
- The episode "Une prof" (2012) of the television series Joséphine, ange gardien was filmed there.

== Bibliography ==
- Rançon, Marie-Louise (1968). Femmes savantes II : 80e anniversaire du lycée Molière [Learned Women II: 80th Anniversary of Lycée Molière] (in French). Paris: Association des anciennes élèves du Lycée Molière.
- Centenaire du lycée Molière. Mémorial 1888-1988 [Centenary of Lycée Molière. Memorial 1888-1988] (in French). 1988. p. 133.
- Des femmes résistantes du lycée Molière - Paris XVIe [Women Resisters of Lycée Molière - Paris 16th] (in French). Cleyriane Éditions. 2021. ISBN 978-2-492160-04-2.
- Westphallen, Marie-Hélène (2013). Les lycéens. Mémoires d'élèves et de professeurs (1880–1980) [High School Students. Memories of Students and Teachers (1880–1980)] (in French). Arènes.
- Gasnault, François (2003). Archives et mémoires lycéennes de Paris 1802-2002 [Archives and Memories of Parisian High School Students 1802-2002] (in French). Archives de Paris. ISBN 2-86075-009-6.
- Schor, Ralph (1995). L'opinion française et les étrangers, 1919-1939 [French Opinion and Foreigners, 1919-1939] (in French). Publications de la Sorbonne. ISBN 2859440712.
