= Camille Sée =

French politician

Personal details
- Born: 10 March 1847 Colmar, France
- Died: 20 January 1919 (aged 71) Paris, France

Camille Sée (10 March 1847 – 20 January 1919) was a French politician who was born in Colmar.

As the pioneer of the 1880 French law which established Lycées for girls, he also created the École normale supérieure in Sèvres in 1881.

He was a député of the Seine Department from 1876 until 1881.

Camille Sée died in Paris at the age of 71.
