= Île de la Cité =

Island in the river Seine, Paris, France

Coordinates: 48°51′17″N 2°20′51″E

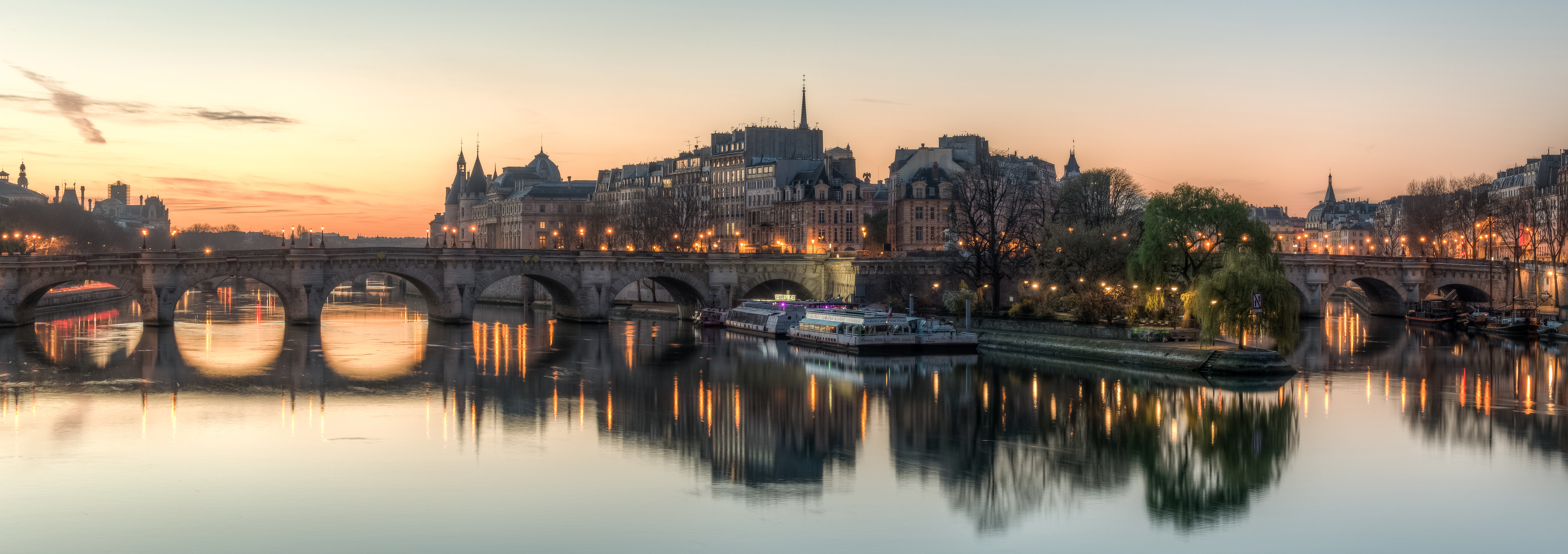
- Île de la Cité, in the centre of Paris (2014)

- Location within Paris
- Interactive map of the Île de la Cité area

General information
- Location: On the Seine in the 1st and 4th arrondissements of Paris, France

The Île de la Cité (French: [il d(ə) la site]; lit. "Island of the City") is one of two natural islands on the Seine River (alongside Île Saint-Louis) in central Paris. It spans 22.5 hectares (56 acres) of land. In the 4th century, it was the site of the fortress of the area governor for the Roman Empire. In 508, Clovis I, the first King of the Franks, established his castle on the island. An early cathedral was built. In the 12th century, its importance as a religious centre increased with the building of Notre-Dame cathedral, and the castle chapel of Sainte-Chapelle. The city hospital, the Hôtel-Dieu, possibly the oldest continuously operating hospital in the world, is also based on the island. Nearby is the site of the city's oldest surviving bridge, the Pont Neuf.

Even with the departure of the French kings to the Louvre Palace across the right bank, and later to the Palace of Versailles, the island remained a centre of administration and law courts. In 1302, it hosted the first meeting of the Parlement of Paris in the old royal palace and was later the site of the trials of aristocrats during the French Revolution. Today, in addition to the prominent cathedral and other shrines, it is the home of the Préfecture de Police, the Palais de Justice, and the Tribunal de commerce de Paris. The Mémorial des Martyrs de la Déportation, a memorial to the 200,000 people deported from Vichy France to Nazi concentration camps during the Second World War, is located at the eastern end of the island. As of 2016, the island's population was 891.

== History ==
=== Early history ===
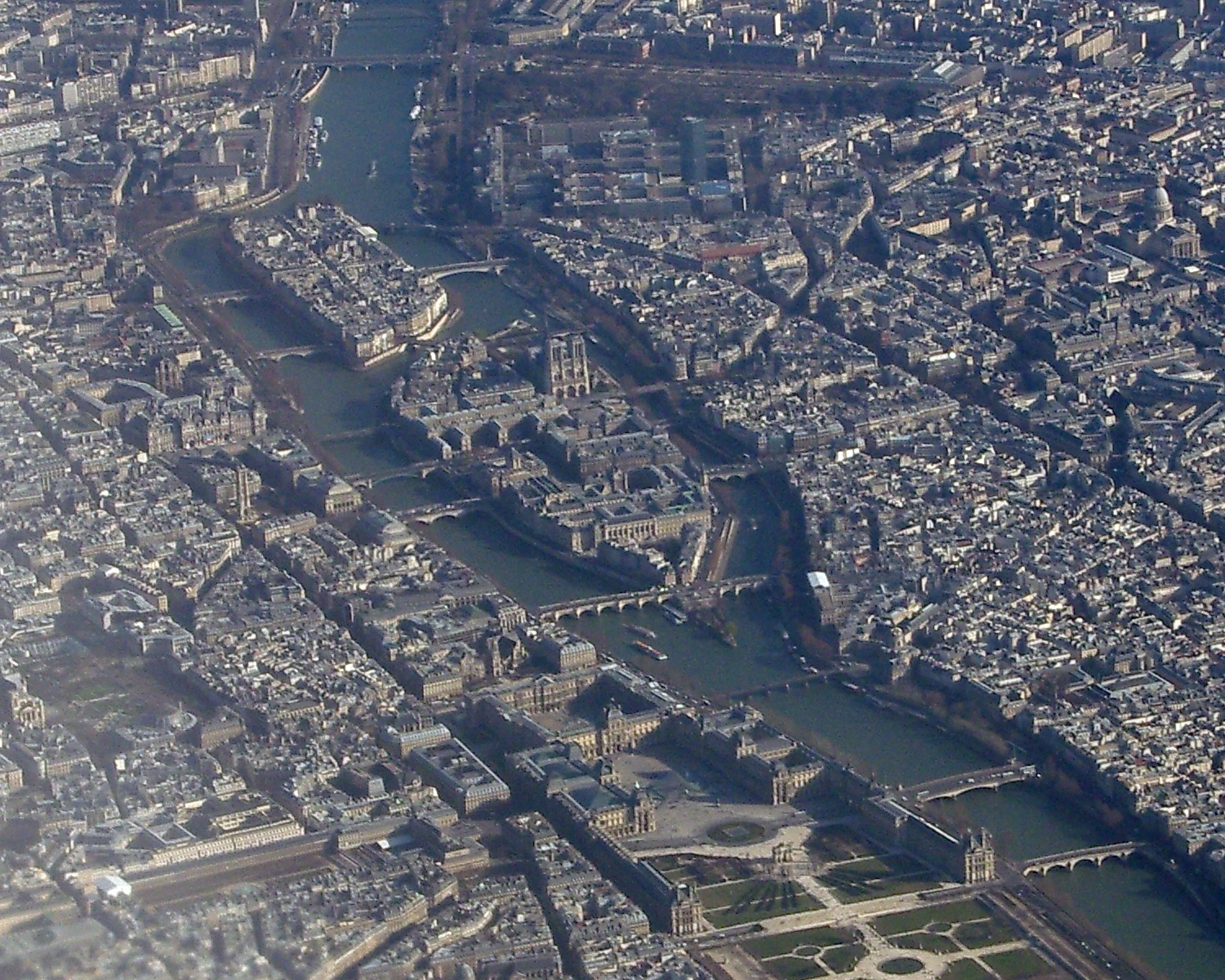
Aerial view of the Île de la Cité (2009)

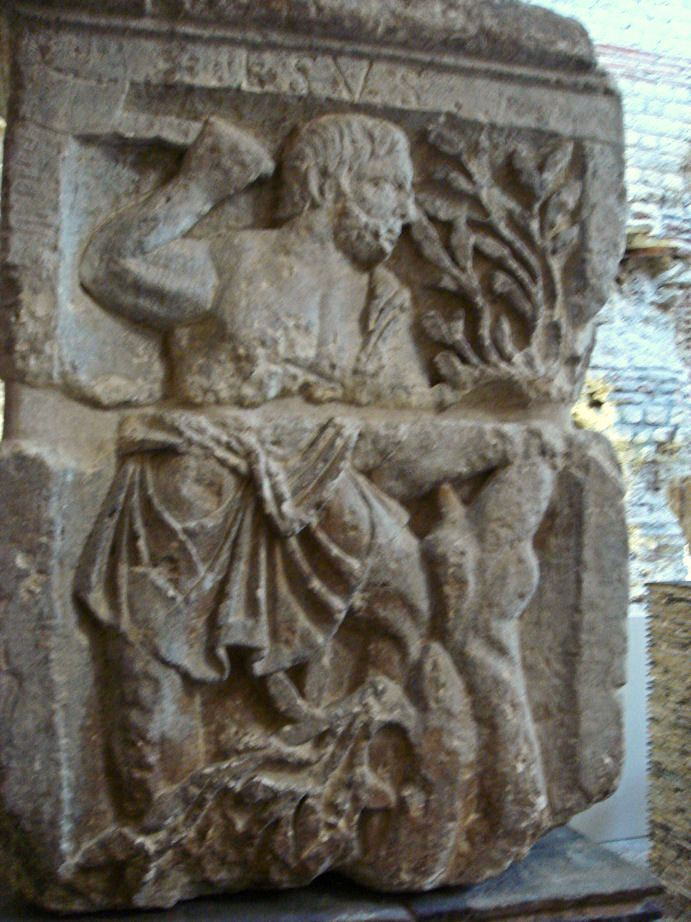
Image of Jupiter on the Pillar of the Boatmen (1st century AD), Cluny, Musée National du Moyen Age

A Gallic settlement, called Lutetia, may have existed on the island since at least the 3rd century BC. The nearby area was inhabited by the Parisii, a small Gallic tribe. The island may have served them as a convenient place to cross the Seine, a base for a flourishing trading network by river, and a place of refuge in times of invasion. However, no significant traces of a settlement earlier than the 1st century AD have been found to date on the island.

The Parisii were famous traders, taking advantage of the trade routes by river throughout Europe. Coins minted by the Parisii, dating to about 100 BC, have been found in excavations across France and other parts of Europe. The island was the most convenient river crossing point, with bridges on both sides of the island.

The first recorded mention of the island is in the "Commentaries" of Julius Caesar. In 53 BC, during the conquest of Gaul, Caesar came to Lutetia and met with the leaders of the Gallic tribes. They agreed to submit to Rome, but then almost immediately rebelled. Caesar sent one of his generals, Titus Labienus, to subdue the Parisii. The Parisii burned the bridges to prevent his passage, but they were outmaneuvered and defeated in battle on the Plain of Auteuil.

An academic debate about the original location of Lutetia began in 2006, following the excavation in 1994–2005 of a large Gallic necropolis, with residences and temples, at Nanterre, along the Seine in the Paris suburbs. Some historians have put forward this settlement at Nanterre as the Lutetia of the Gauls, rather than Île de la Cité. Other historians point out that Caesar described "Lutetia, fortress ('oppidum') of the Parisii, situated on an island." They say that the absence of traces of pre-Roman settlement discovered so far on Île de la Cité is due primarily to the continuous building and rebuilding on the island over the centuries.

After the conquest of the Parisii, the Roman town of Lutetia developed mainly on the Left Bank, where the temples and baths were located. However, in the 3rd century AD, a series of invasions by Germanic tribes began; the Roman town on the left bank was sacked in 275–76. Afterwards, the left bank was largely abandoned. Beginning in 307 AD, the forum, amphitheater, and other structures were demolished and the stone was used to construct a rampart around the island, as well as to construct new buildings. The stone wall was not very high - only about two meters - but was apparently topped by a further wooden palisade. The island became an important defensive position on the northern flank of the Roman Empire. In 451, during the late Roman Empire, when the Huns occupied the left bank, Saint Genevieve led the defence of the city from the island.

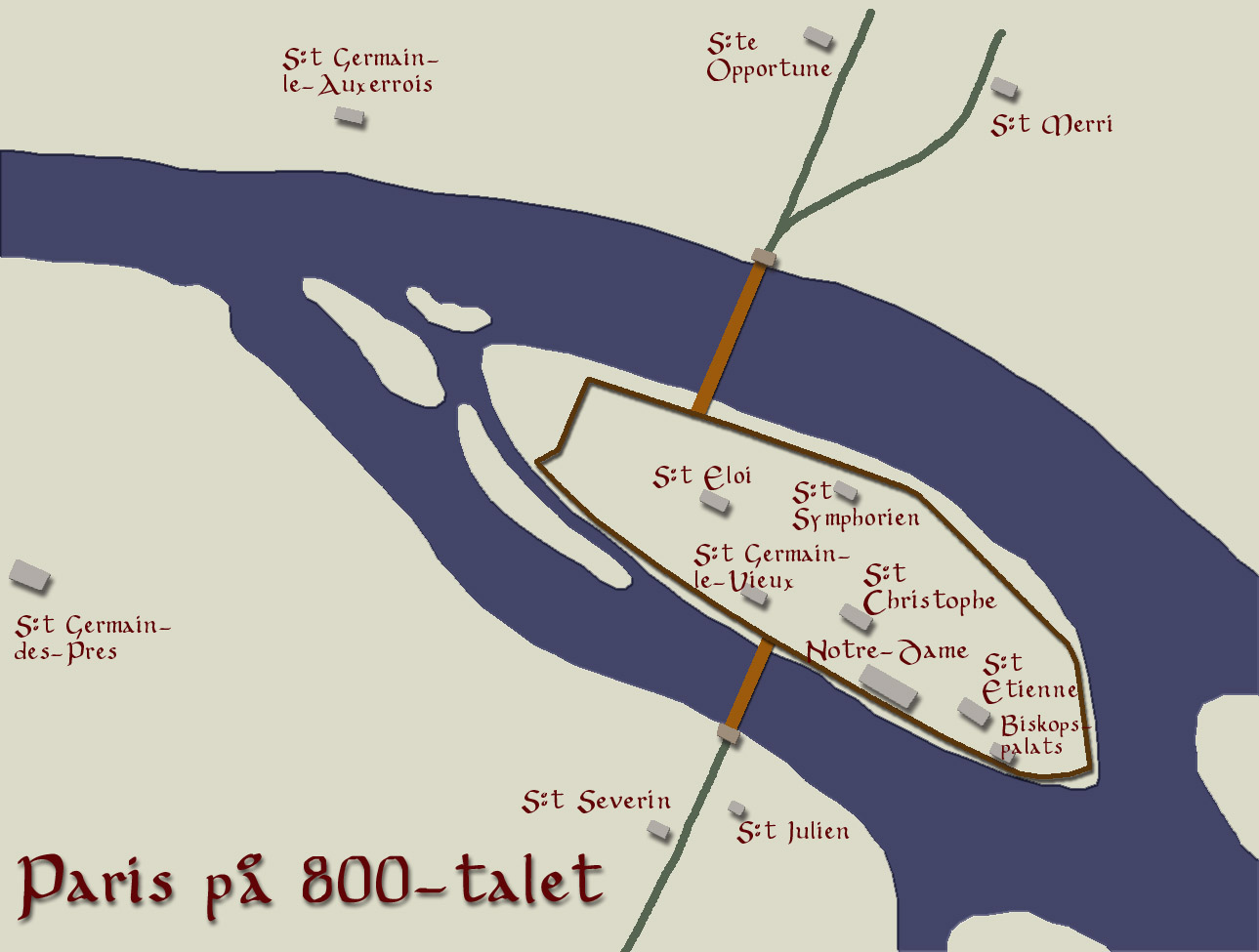
Map of Paris in the 9th century, showing the city concentrated on Île de la Cité.

The Roman Emperor Julian, residing in Gaul from 355 to 361, described "a small island lying in the river; a wall entirely surrounds it, and wooden bridges lead to it on both sides." At what was then the western end of the island was the residence of the Roman governor, near the present Palais de Justice. It was described as a "Palace", but appears to have been a very modest residence.

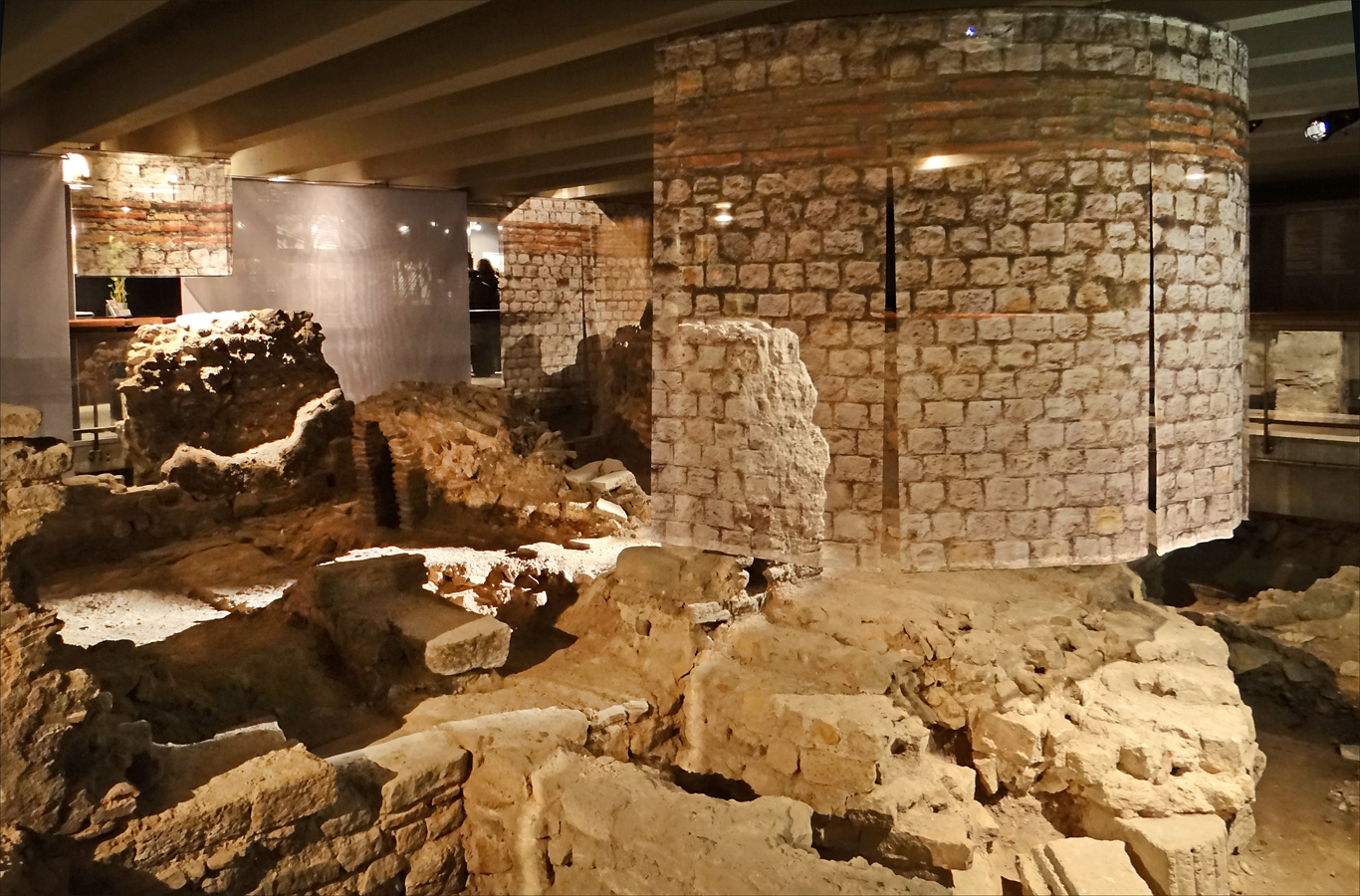
Archeological crypt under the Parvis Notre-Dame – Place Jean-Paul II

The Romans also built a new wharf, where the Parvis Notre-Dame – Place Jean-Paul II is today. The island was much smaller then; the Roman wharf is now well inland, far from the present edge of the island. Remains of the wharf can be seen in the archeological crypt under the Parvis, in front of Notre-Dame de Paris. One important monument left by the Parisii was discovered here: the Pillar of the Boatmen, a group of statues erected by the boatmen of the city in the 1st century AD, honouring both Roman and Gallic gods.

In addition to the residence of the Roman governor, the island contained the civic basilica, which held the courts of justice. It was located near the present flower market and Metro station, and was a large rectangular building 70 by 35 meters in size, with a central nave and two collateral aisles. Its foundations were discovered during the construction of the Metro station in 1906. It, too, was built with stones taken from the forum on the Left Bank.

In 486, Saint Genevieve negotiated the submission of Paris to Clovis I, the first King of the Franks, who chose Paris as his capital, in 508. The first cathedral of Paris, that of Saint Étienne, was constructed in 540–545, close to the west front of the present Notre Dame de Paris and just a few hundred meters from the Royal Palace.

Hugh Capet (c. 941–996), the founder of the Capetian dynasty, began as ruler of a kingdom not much larger than the Paris region, but through conquest and marriage, he and his descendants made the Kingdom of France into an important European power. The visible symbol of Capetian power was the Palais de la Cité, which he and his descendants enlarged and embellished. Philippe IV built the Grand Chamber and new walls, with two towers: the Tower of Caesar and the Tower of Silver. Louis VI (1081–1137) tore down the old tower and built an even larger one, which remained until the 18th century.

=== 12th–17th century ===
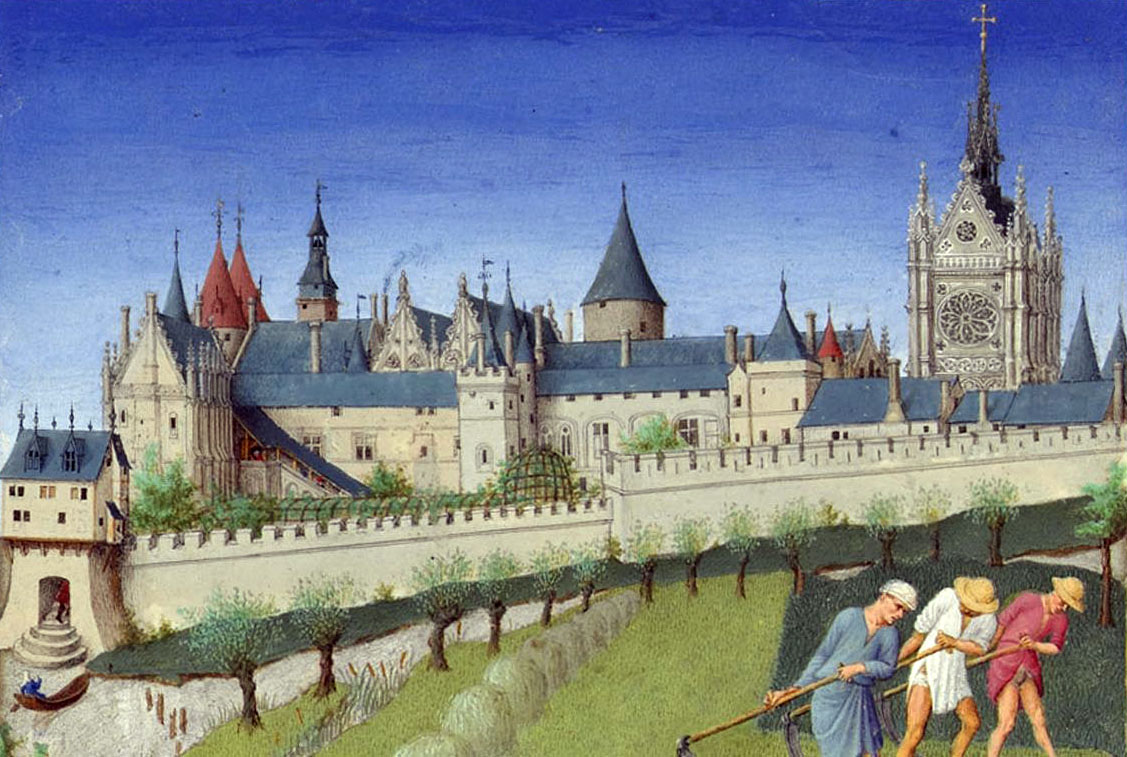
The royal palace on Île de la Cité in the Très Riches Heures du Duc de Berry, circa 1410, showing the Sainte-Chapelle at right

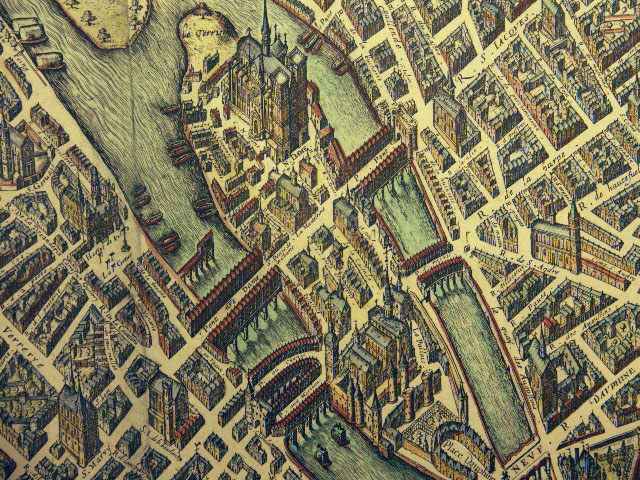
The island in 1609 (Plan de Vassalieu) with Notre-Dame de Paris at the top

Louis IX built his new chapel, the jewel-like Sainte-Chapelle, between 1242 and 1248. During the same period, the most famous landmark of the island was constructed: the cathedral of Notre-Dame de Paris. An earlier cathedral, the Cathedral of Saint-Étienne, had been constructed in the Romanesque style. In 1160, the bishop of Paris, Maurice de Sully, began construction of a cathedral in the new Gothic style, to match the magnificence of the palace. The first stones of the foundation of the new cathedral were laid by Pope Alexander III, in 1163. Its construction spanned two centuries.

During this period, new streets and houses were constructed on the island, which became more and more densely populated. The crowding of the island, and the resulting problems of narrow streets jammed with traffic, pollution, and foul smells, caused the Kings of France to search for a new residence. A rebellion of the Parisians in 1358, led by Étienne Marcel, the provost of the merchants, at a time when the French King was a hostage of the English, caused the next King, Charles V of France, to move his residence to the edge of the city: first to the Hôtel Saint-Pol, then to the Bastille, and finally to the Louvre Palace.

In the following centuries, after the Kings departed, the island retained its importance as an administrative centre. It was home to the courts and tribunals, as well as the Parlement of Paris: an assembly of nobles who formally registered royal proclamations. It included the Conciergerie, which contained the royal prisons and judicial offices. Other important transformations were made to the island. In 1585, work began on the Pont Neuf at the far west end of the island. In 1607, Henry IV gave up the royal garden on the island, which was transformed into the Place Dauphine, and the Pont Neuf was completed.

When the Pont Neuf was built, two small islands, Île à la Gourdaine and Île aux Juifs, which were just to the west of the island, were joined to it. The Ilot des Juifs had been the site of the burning at the stake of Jacques de Molay, the leader of the Knights Templar, in 1314, as the island was just below the towers of the Royal Palace. The junction of the small islands was completed in 1607, and the land was developed into the Place Dauphine and the Square du Vert-Galant.

Henry IV began the practice of selling lots on the island for private townhouses, particularly the development of the Place Dauphine at the east end of the island. In the same century, Louis XIII made a major improvement to the island by building stone river banks to contain the river. This did not prevent a major flood of the Seine in 1689–90, which ruined the lower stained glass windows of the Sainte-Chapelle.

=== 18th century ===
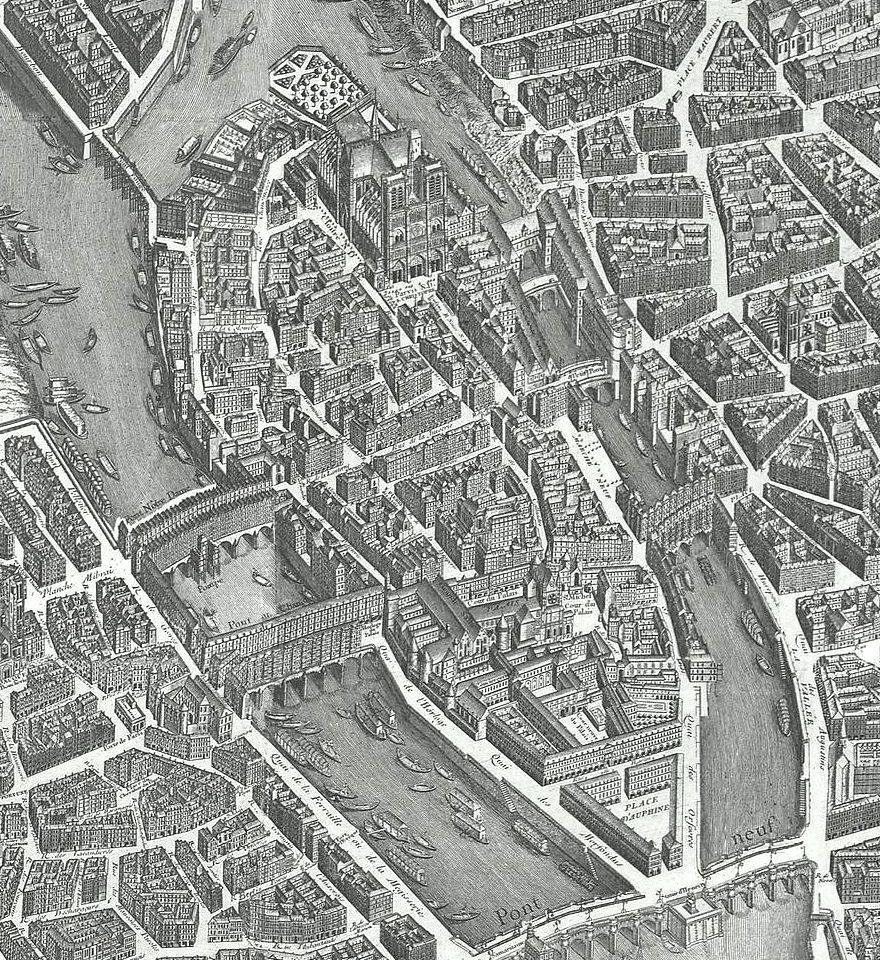
The island in 1739 (Plan de Turgot)

In the 18th century, the Conciergerie on the island became the scene of some of the most dramatic events of the French Revolution. In 1788, the Constituent Assembly, meeting in the former royal palace, refused the demands of Louis XVI to turn over some of its members. In 1790, Jean Sylvain Baily, the mayor of Paris, sealed the doors of the royal palace. In August 1793, Queen Marie-Antoinette was taken to the Conciergerie, where she was imprisoned. After two and a half months she was tried, convicted, and sentenced to the guillotine. In September 1793, the radical Sans-Culottes stormed the Conciergerie and massacred the remaining royalist prisoners. On 27 July 1794, it was the turn of the revolutionary leader Robespierre to be arrested, brought to the Conciergerie, tried, and sent to the guillotine.

Notre-Dame de Paris also suffered during the French Revolution; it was closed and then turned into a Temple of Reason; much of the sculpture – particularly in the portals on the west front – was defaced or destroyed. The neighbouring Hôtel-Dieu hospital sounded too religious for the secular revolutionaries, so its name was changed to the "House of Humanity". Restoration of the revolutionary damage did not begin until the 1830s, particularly following the success of Victor Hugo's 1831 novel The Hunchback of Notre-Dame.

=== 19th–21st centuries ===
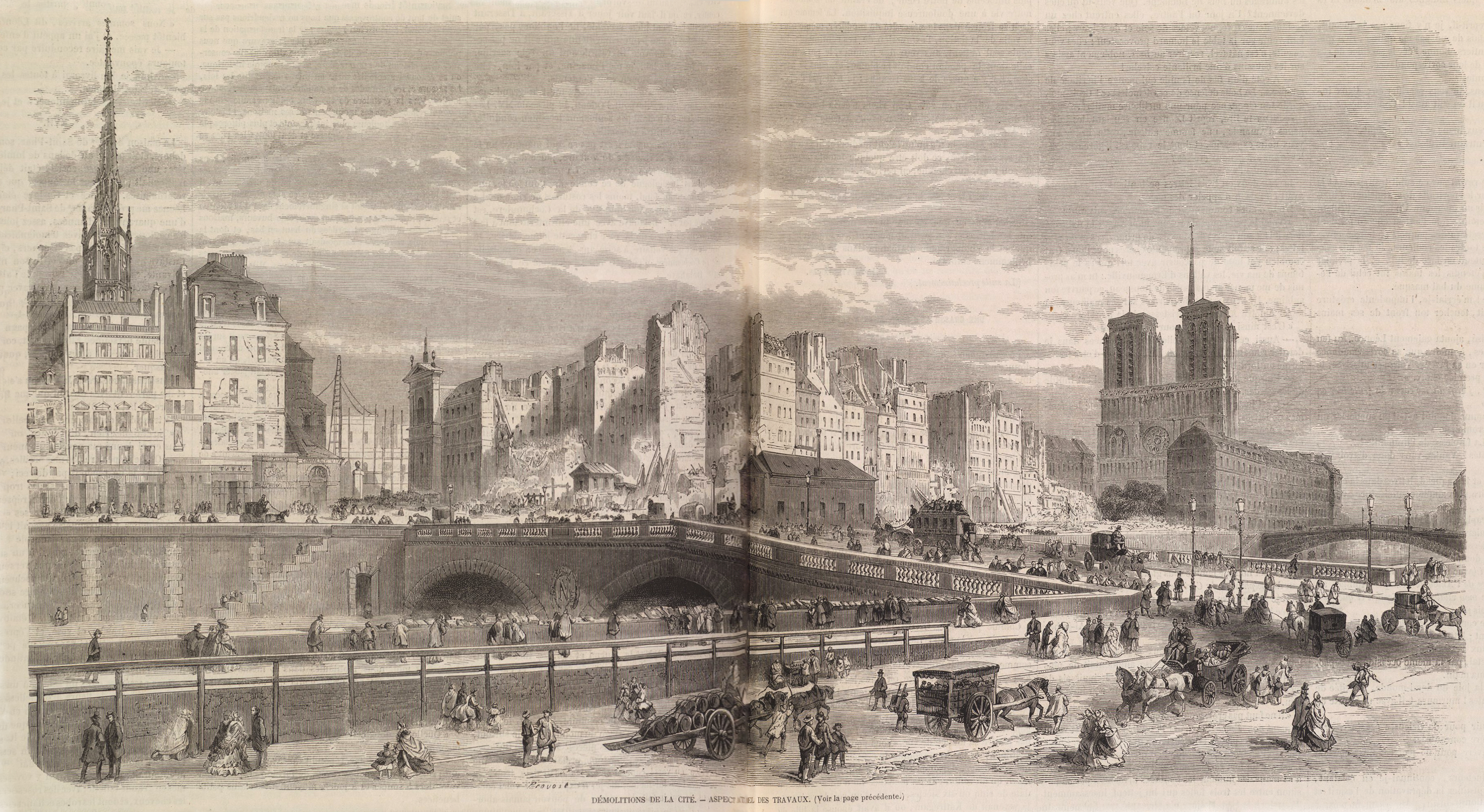
Haussmann's demolition of the overcrowded streets of the island (1862)

In the early 19th century, with the restoration of the monarchy, the old palace was substantially rebuilt for its function as the centre of the judicial system. An expiatory chapel was built where the cell of Marie-Antoinette had been. Between 1820 and 1828, the façade between the Tower of the Horloge and the Tower of Bonbec was rebuilt. It remained a prison; the future Napoleon III was imprisoned there for a time following a failed attempt to overthrow the government.

In the mid-19th century, the island was overcrowded, with narrow streets and poor sanitation. It was hard hit by major cholera epidemics in 1832 and 1849, which killed thousands of Parisians. The new president, and then Emperor, Napoleon III, ordered the demolition of the old streets and buildings and the opening of wide avenues and squares. The Parvis in front of the cathedral was greatly increased in size. In 1867, Napoleon III also demolished the overcrowded medieval hospital, the Hôtel-Dieu, and replaced it with the present building.

The mid-19th century brought a new campaign of rebuilding and restoration. Between 1837 and 1863, the Saint Chapelle - which had been turned into a storehouse for legal documents - was restored to its medieval splendor. The façade of the Palace of Justice was entirely rebuilt between 1847 and 1871. The medieval hall and the Bonbec Tower were restored to their original appearance.

The Paris Commune of 1871 brought a brief wave of destruction. In the final days of the Commune, the Communards set fire to the Palace of Justice, and attempted to burn down Notre-Dame de Paris. A large part of the Palace of Justice was destroyed, but Notre-Dame was saved by the cathedral staff, suffering only minimal damage. Between 1904 and 1914, the Palace of Justice was finally completed. The Conciergerie had been declared an historic monument in 1862. It was opened to the public in 1914, and the remaining prison sections were closed in 1934.

In December 2016, in a report submitted to President of the Republic François Hollande, Philippe Bélaval, President of the Centre des monuments nationaux, and architect Dominique Perrault proposed enhancing the cultural and tourist appeal of the Île de la Cité. To this end, pedestrian promenades and walkways would be created. The Cour du Mai and the Palais de Justice gallery, after the court's relocation to the Cité judiciaire at Batignolles, would become a major public hub, connecting the Conciergerie and the Sainte-Chapelle. Courtyards of the Hôtel-Dieu, the Police Prefecture, and the Palais de Justice would be covered with glass roofs, similar to the Louvre Palace.

== Map ==
Map of the Île de la Cité

== Description ==
=== Square de l'Île de la Cité and Memorial to the Martyrs of the Deportation ===
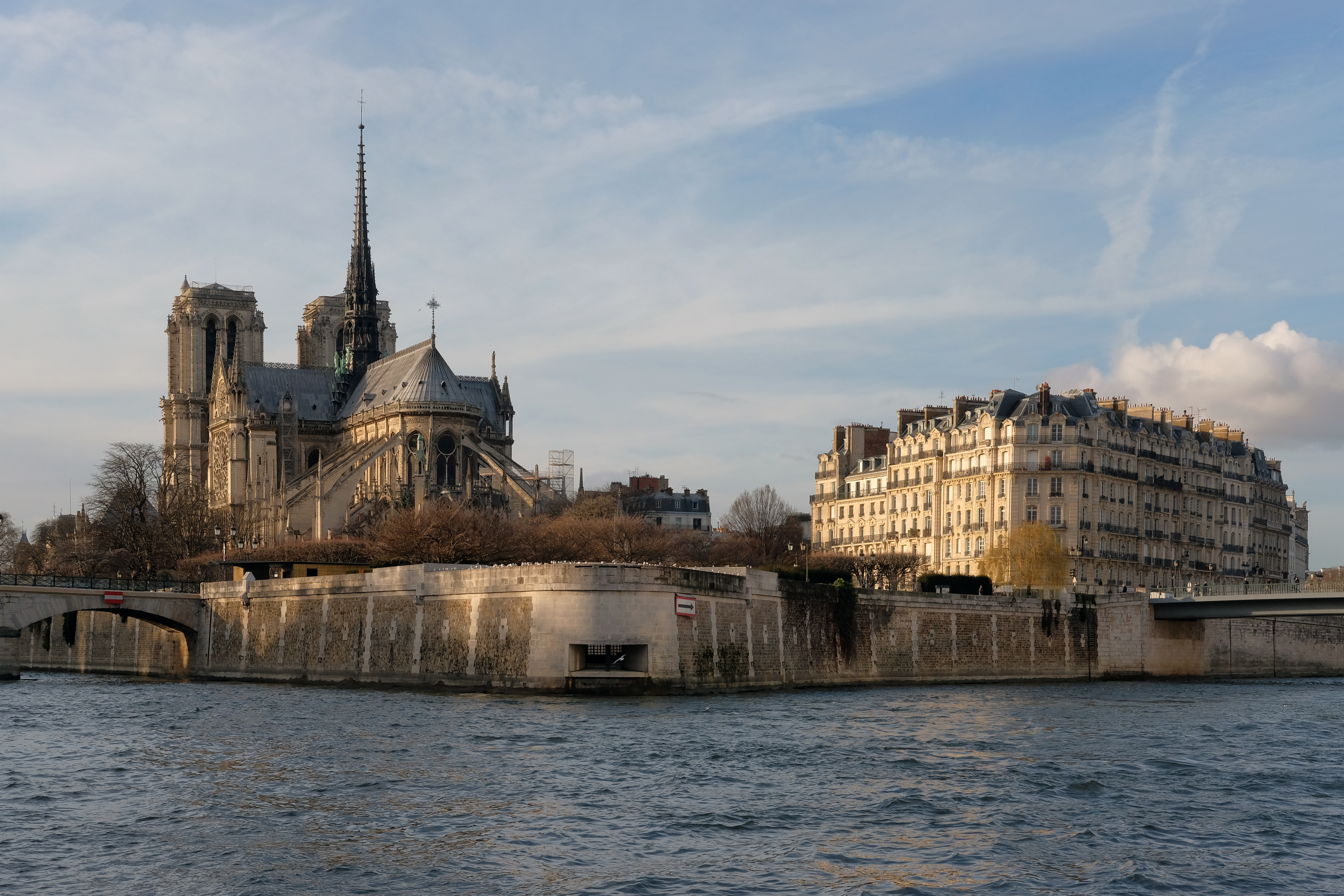
The east end of the island, and wall of the Memorial to the Martyrs of the Deportation

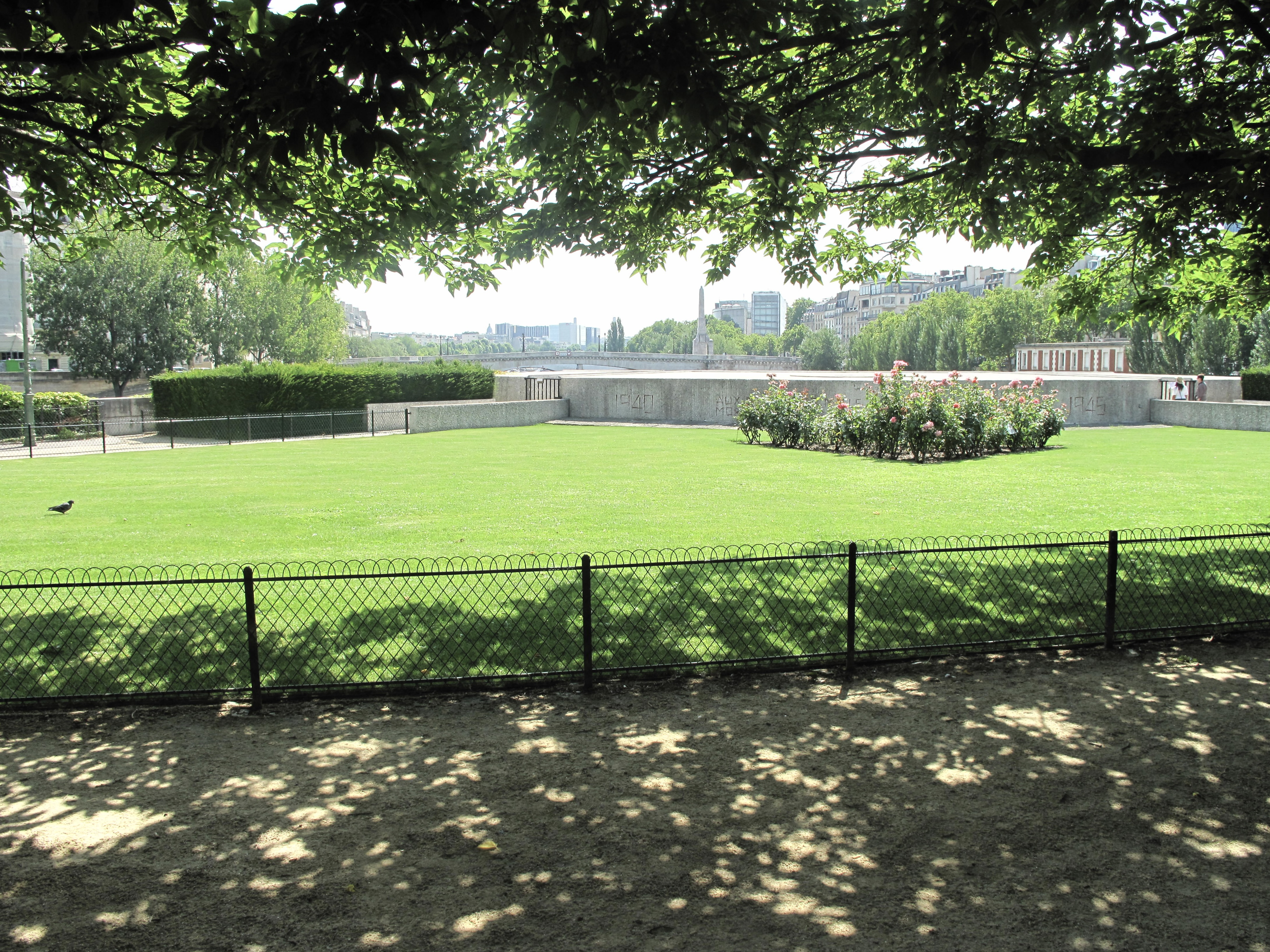
Square of l'Île de la Cité and entrance to the Memorial to the Martyrs of the Deportation

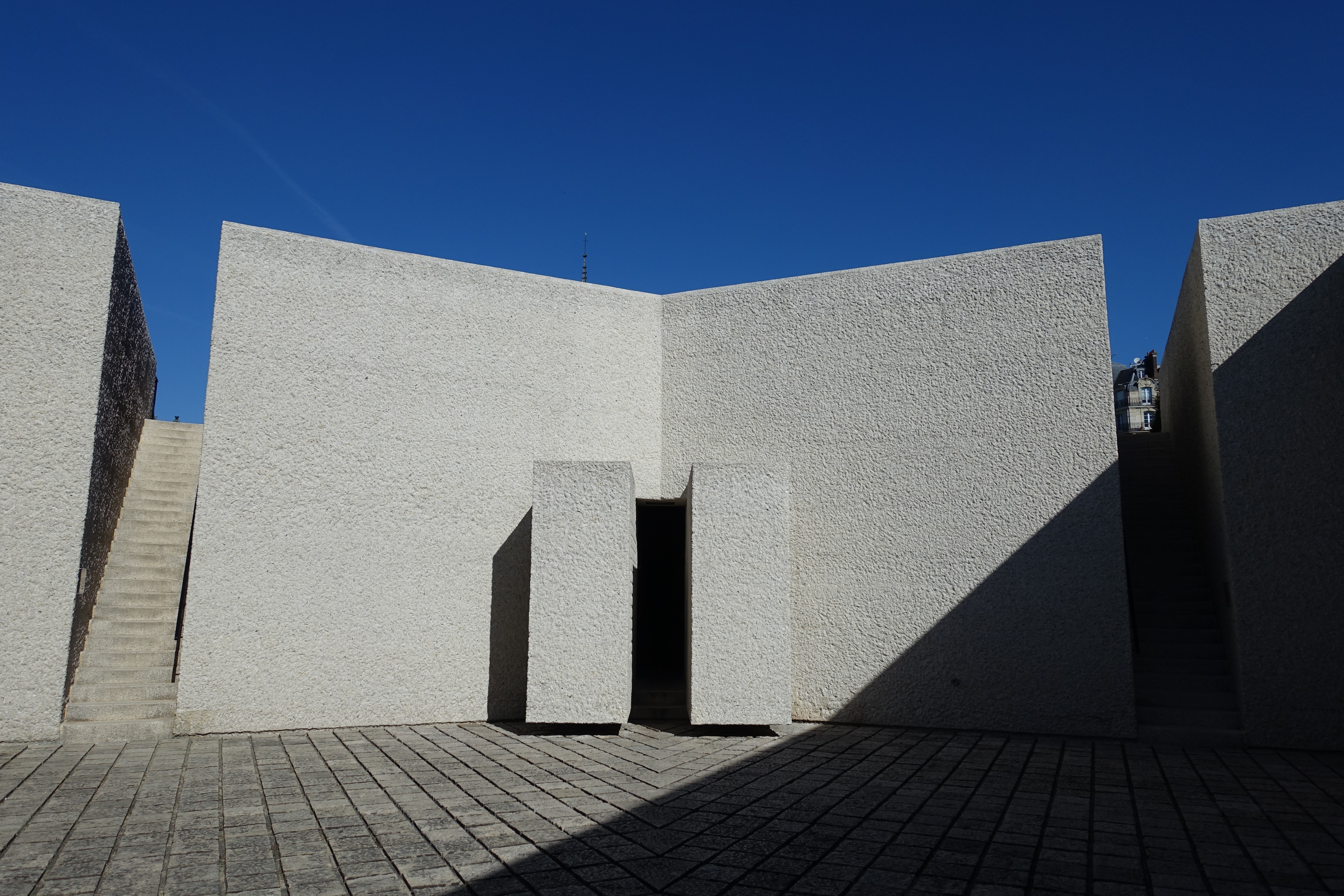
Courtyard of Memorial

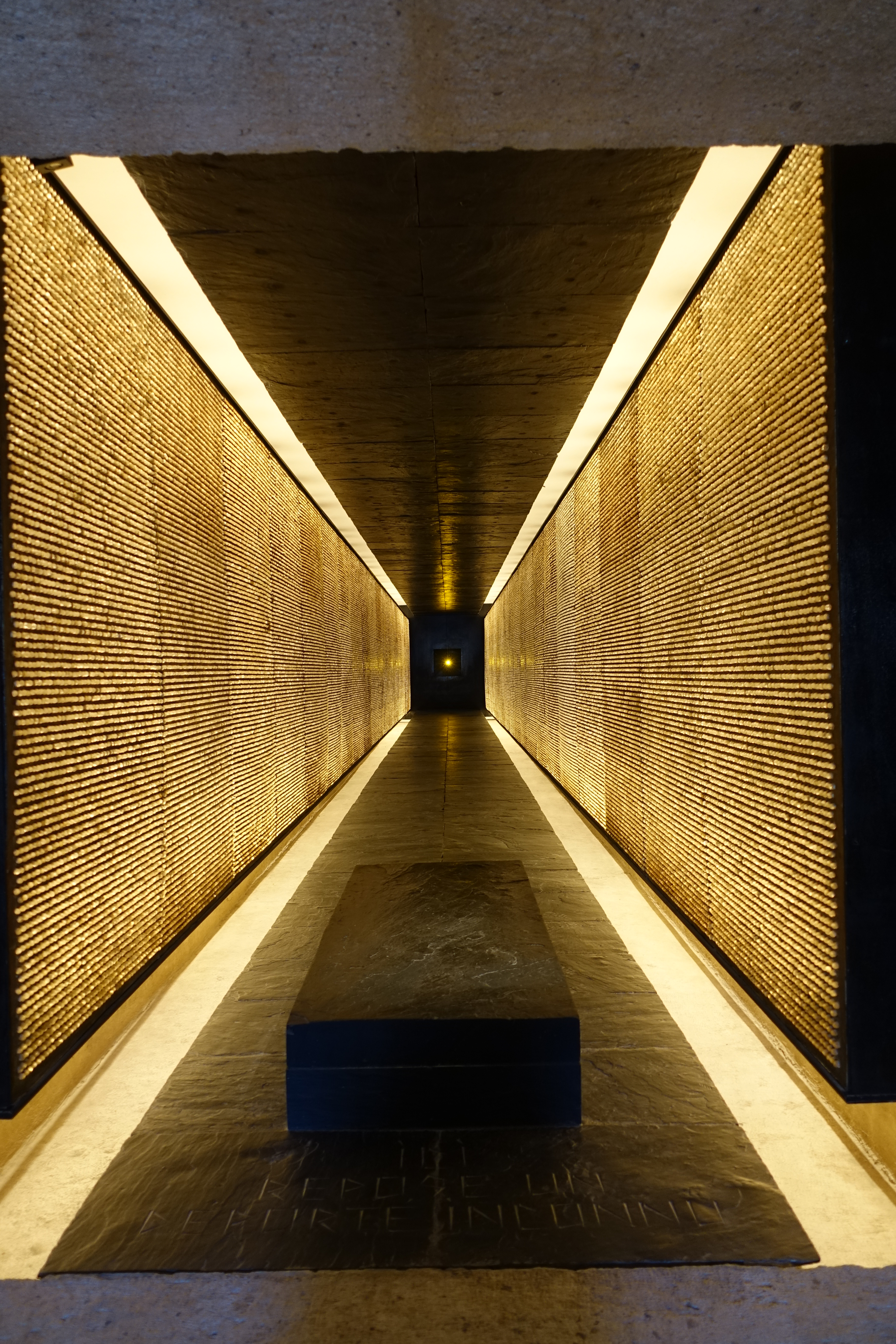
Interior of the Memorial

The Place de l'Île de la Cité is a small park located at the extreme eastern tip of the island, behind the cathedral. It originally was a separate island, called La Motte-aux-Papelards, made up in part of debris from the construction of the cathedral. In 1864, Baron Haussmann chose it as the new site for the Paris morgue, which remained there for fifty years.

Next to the square is the Memorial to the Martyrs of the Deportation, a memorial to the two hundred thousand people who were sent to Nazi concentration camps during World War II. It was dedicated in 1962 by then-President Charles de Gaulle. The monument is at a lower level than the park, reached by a narrow stairway. It is extremely stark and simple, composed of a triangular courtyard giving access to a crypt and corridor. The walls of the crypt are inscribed with the names of concentration camps and with quotations by writers; the corridor is lined with two hundred thousand small glass crystals, each representing a victim of the deportations.

=== The Cathedral and Parvis of Notre-Dame ===
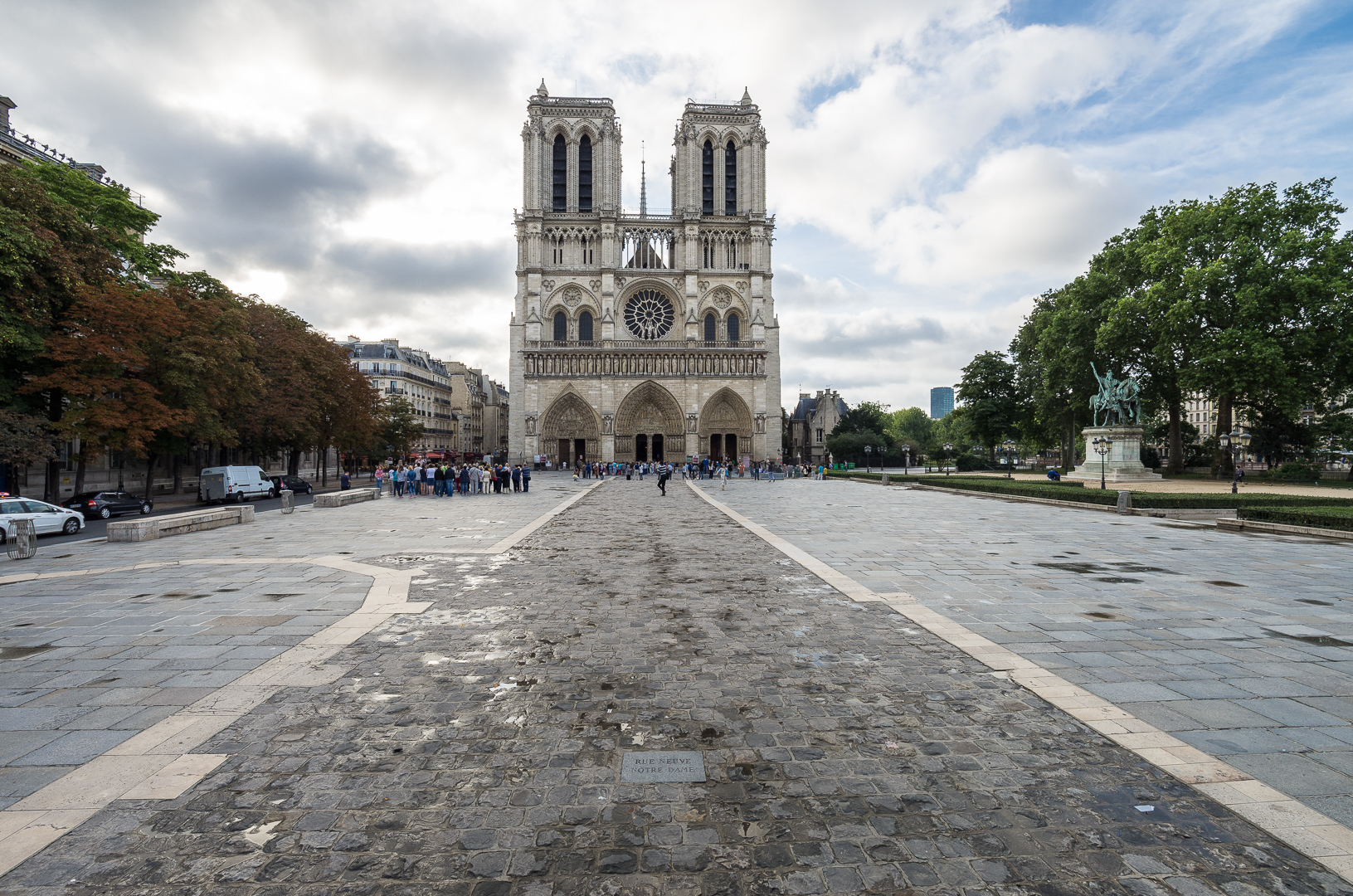
The cathedral and
Place Jean-Paul II

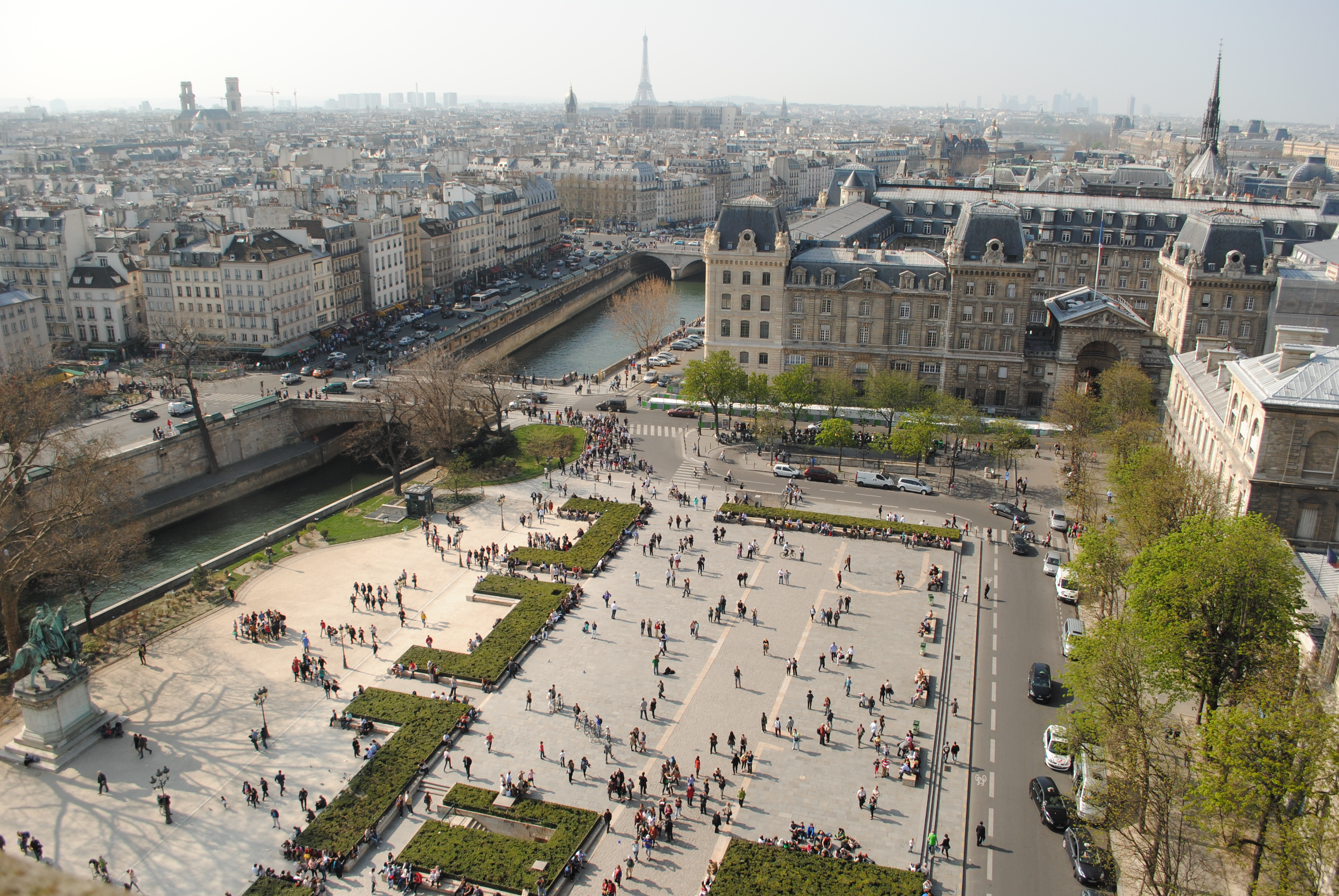
Place Jean-Paul II, the parvis of Notre-Dame de Paris, seen from the cathedral tower

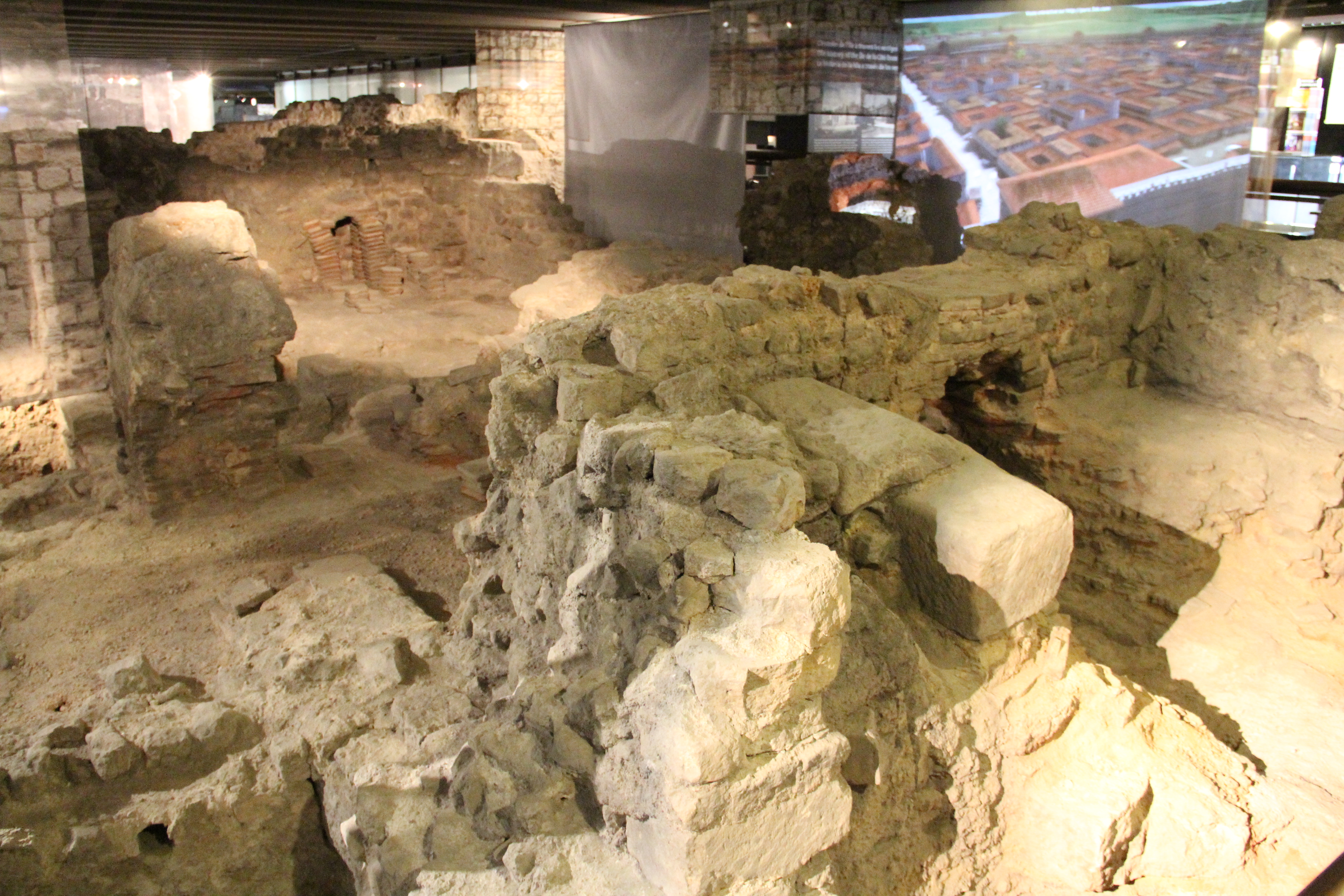
Vestiges of Gallo-Roman baths under the parvis
(4th c.)

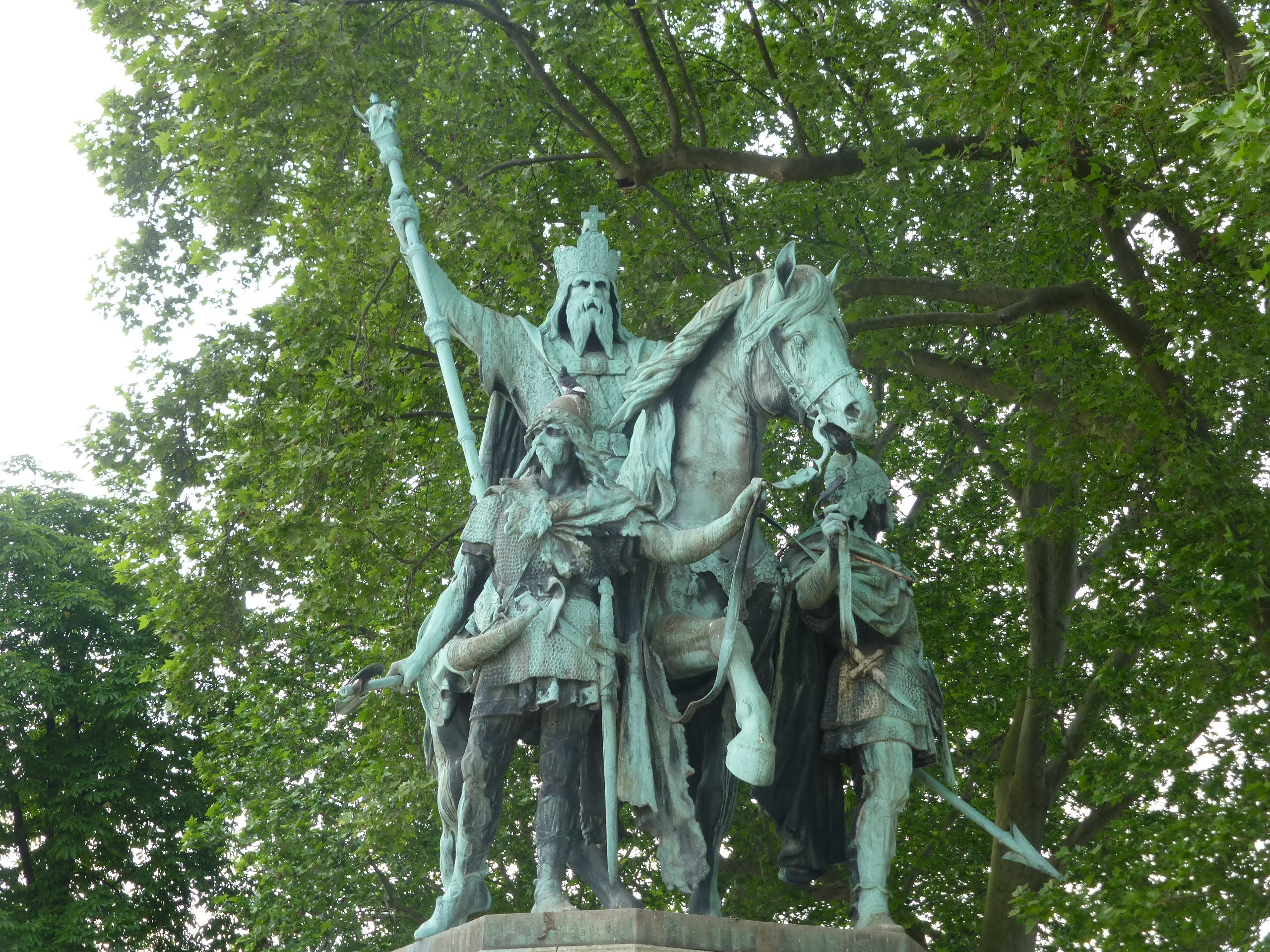
Statue of Charlemagne by the Parvis of Notre Dame

The Cathedral of Notre-Dame de Paris is among the most visible and celebrated landmarks of Paris. Construction began in 1163, next to the older Romanesque Cathedral of Saint-Étienne, and was largely completed by 1345. It is among the largest Gothic cathedrals in Europe, with a seating capacity of six-and-a-half thousand. The flèche, or Spire of Notre-Dame de Paris, originally built in 1220–1230, was removed in the 17th century, then rebuilt by Eugène Viollet-le-Duc in the mid-19th century. At ninety-six metres (315 ft) high, it was the tallest structure in Paris until the construction of the Eiffel Tower. The spire and much of the roof were destroyed by the Notre-Dame de Paris fire on 15 April 2019 and the cathedral was closed for restoration. It re-opened on 7 December 2024.

The parvis or square in front of the cathedral – now officially known as Place Jean-Paul-II – is 135 metres (443 ft) long and 106 metres (348 ft) wide, six times larger than the original medieval square. The area in front of the church was packed with narrow houses and streets until Paris was rebuilt in a more expansive style by Napoleon III and Baron Haussmann in the mid-19th century.

Excavations for a car park under the square in 1965 uncovered vestiges of the original Gallo-Roman walls of the city and the Roman baths, dating to the 4th century. They are now open to the public.

A plaque on the parvis thirty meters in front of the central portal marks the point from which distances by road to other cities in France are measured. This same area, in medieval times, was the location of the stocks, where notorious prisoners were displayed in chains.

The statue of Emperor Charlemagne on horseback, by the river in front of the cathedral, is the largest monument on the Parvis. The bronze sculpture was made in 1878 by the brothers Louis and Charles Rochet in the romantic style. The legendary knights Roland and Olivier are portrayed walking alongside the emperor.

=== Place Louis-Lepine, the Flower Market and the Tribunal of Commerce ===
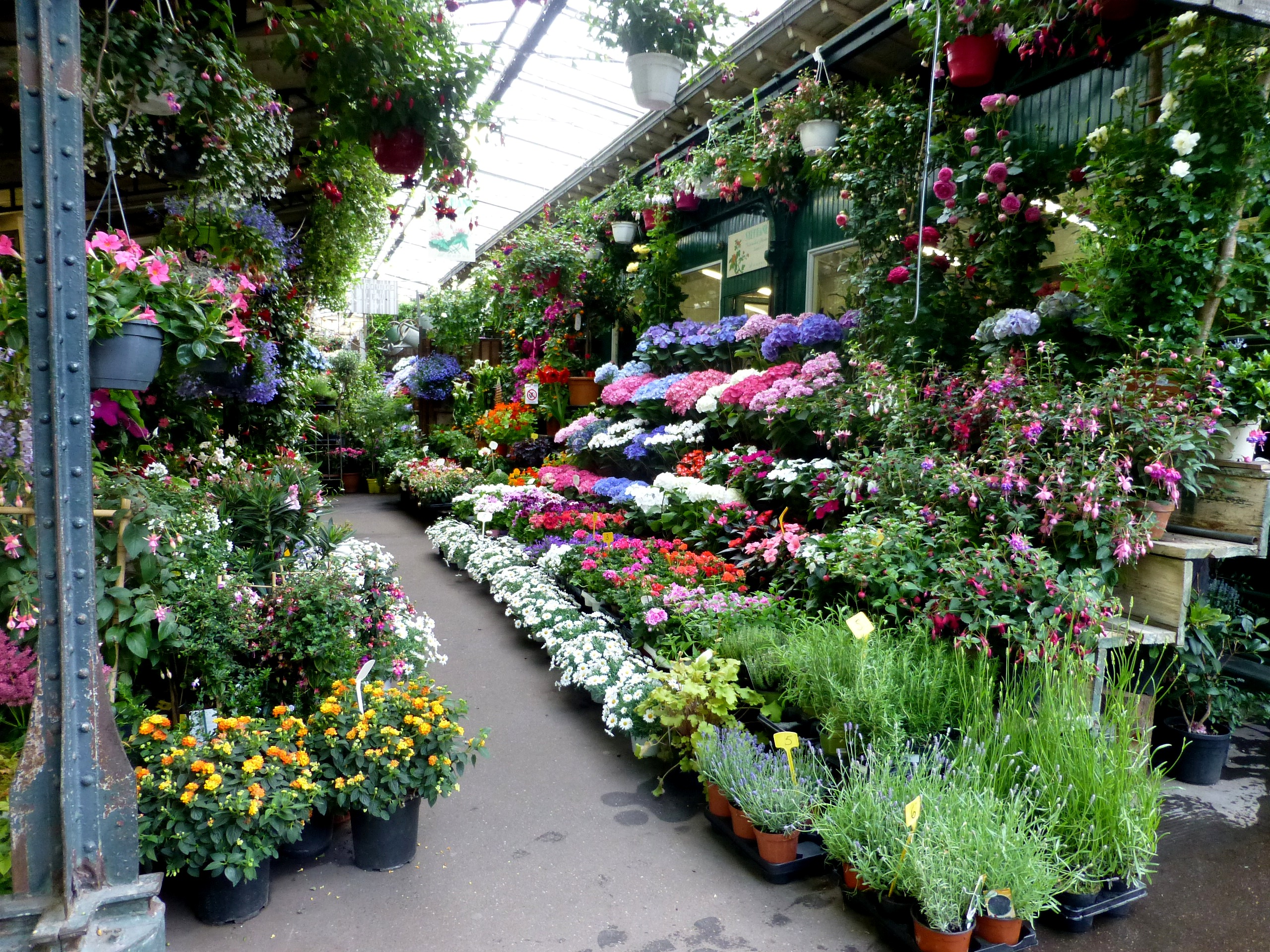
The Flower Market

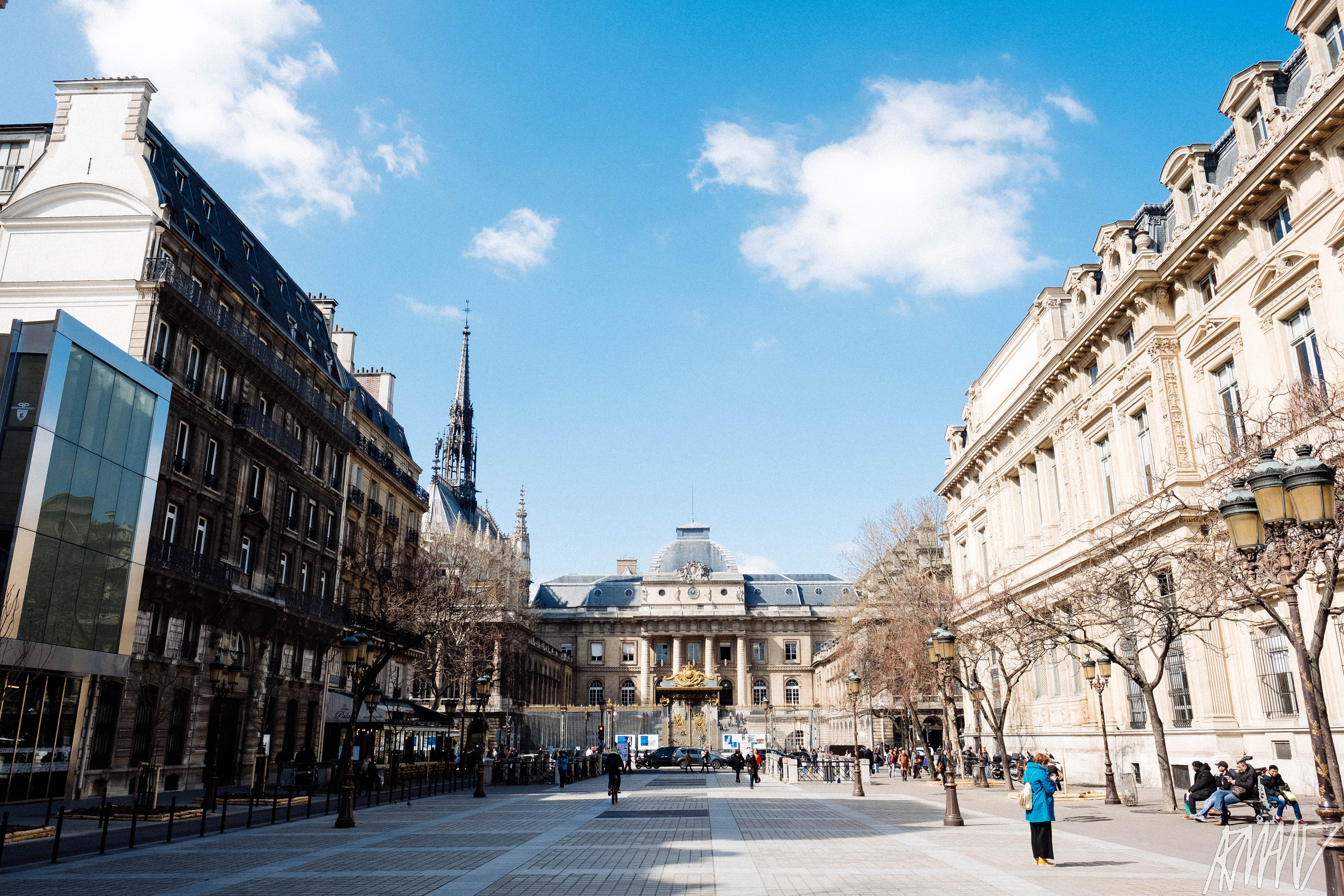
Place Louis-Lépine, facing the Palais de Justice

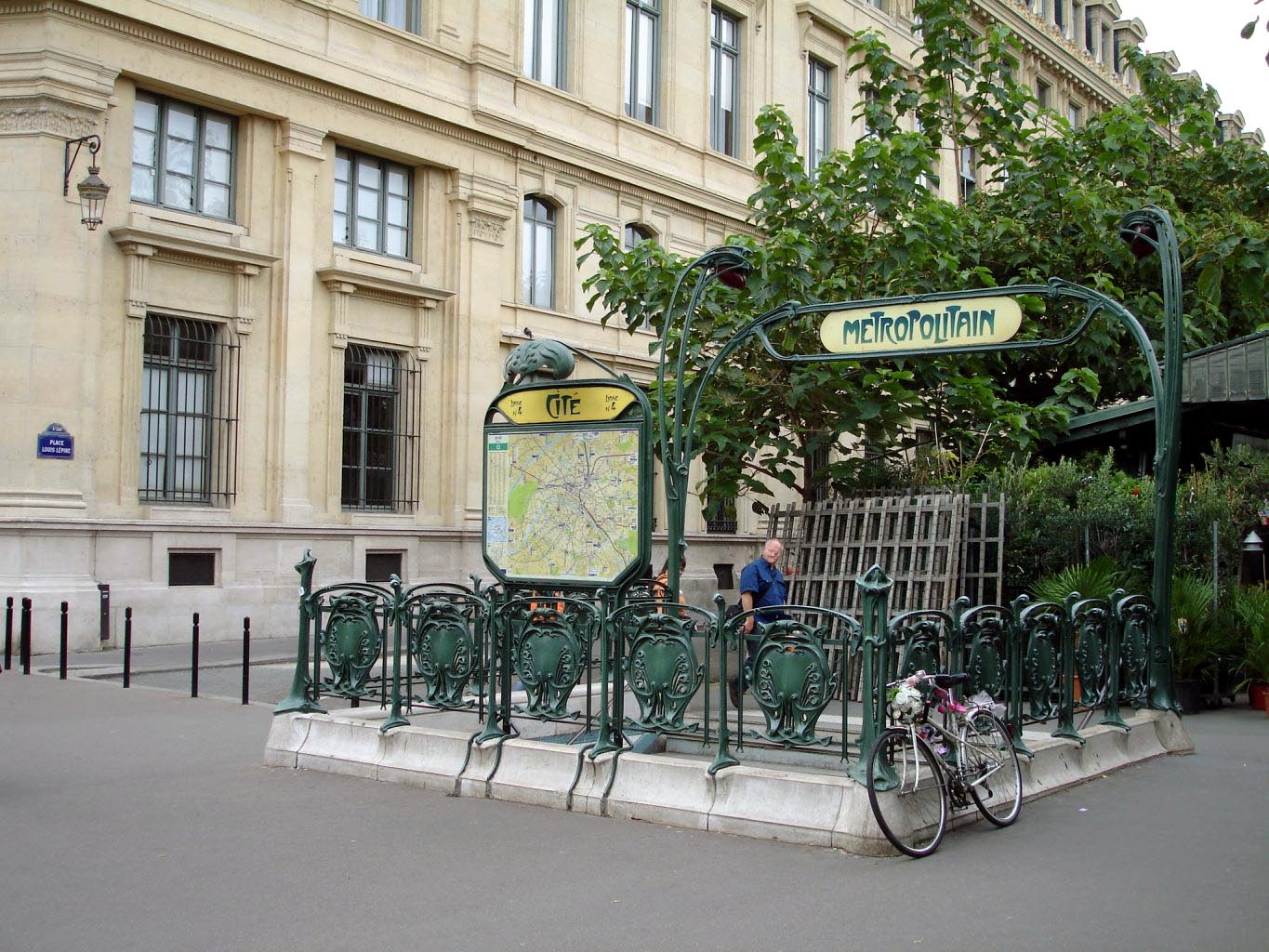
Metro station Cité on Place Louis-Lépine

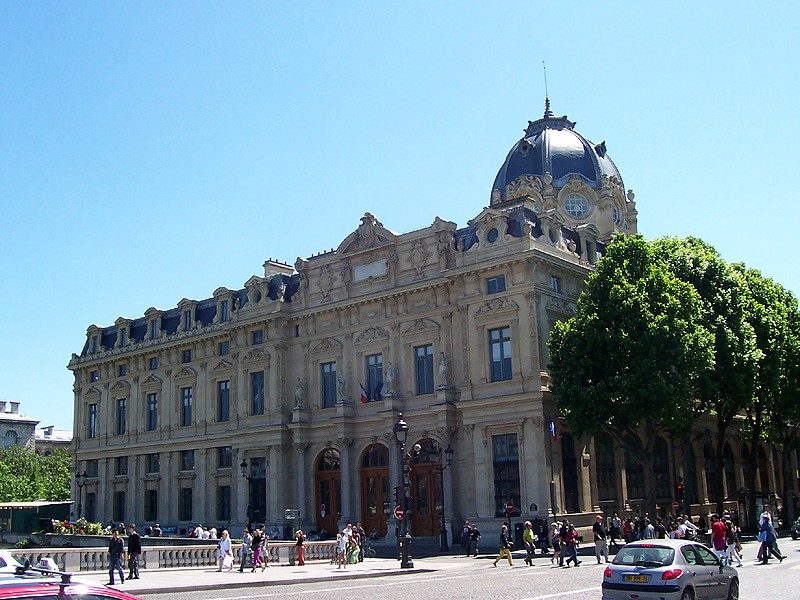
The Tribunal de commerce de Paris

A large square – Place Louis-Lépine – is located in the centre of the island, in front of the Prefecture of Police. It hosts a famous flower market, which was created by an ordinance of Napoleon in January 1808. It occupies the space between Place-Louis Lepine and the Seine. In 2016 the market was renamed the Marché aux fleurs Reine-Elizabeth-II, during the visit of Queen Elizabeth II to Paris. On Sundays, it also becomes a large market for live birds and other pets. The square is the location of the only metro station on the island, with an Art Nouveau portal designed by Hector Guimard. The metro station is unusually deep — twenty metres (66 ft) underground — because the tunnel carrying the trains must pass underneath the River Seine.

The Caserne de la Cité was built under Napoleon III as a barracks of the Republican Guard. It was gradually expanded into a police headquarters with authority over the twenty districts of Paris and the departments surrounding Paris. During the liberation of Paris in August 1944, the building was the scene of fierce fighting. When the French police went on strike, the occupying German forces attacked the building with tanks. One hundred and sixty-seven policemen were killed.

Alongside the Quai de la Corse, at the Pont au Change, is the Tribunal de commerce de Paris, which contains the courts of business and commerce. The judges of this court are not lawyers, but business people elected for 2–4 year terms. The building was constructed between 1860 and 1865 in the extremely ornate Louis XIII style – like the Palais Garnier opera house, built at about the same time. Its dome was inspired by the New Cathedral, Brescia in Italy, begun in 1604 but not finished until 1825. Napoleon III had admired it in 1859 during his military campaign which liberated Italy from Austrian rule.

=== The Hôtel-Dieu ===
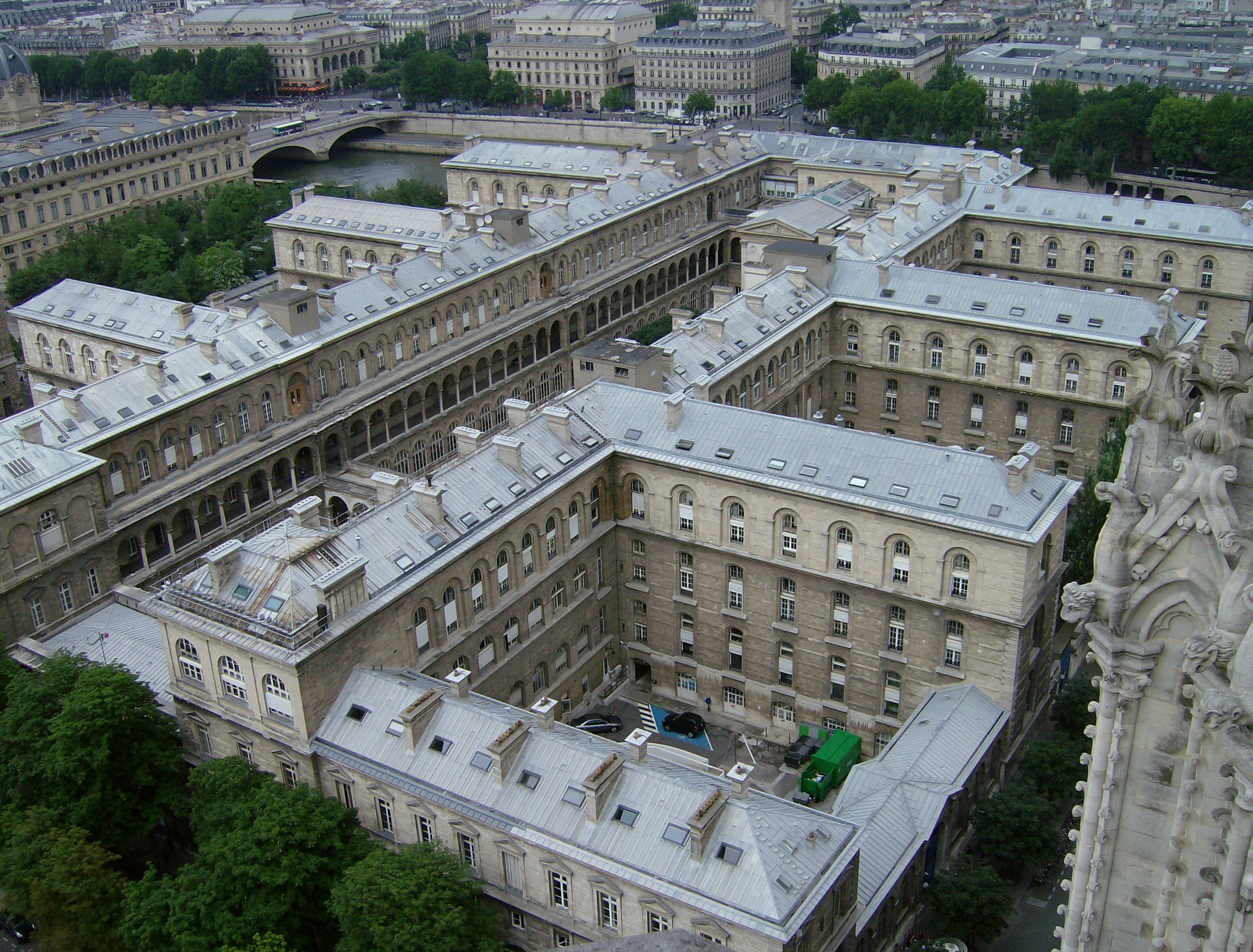
The Hôtel-Dieu seen from the tower of Notre-Dame

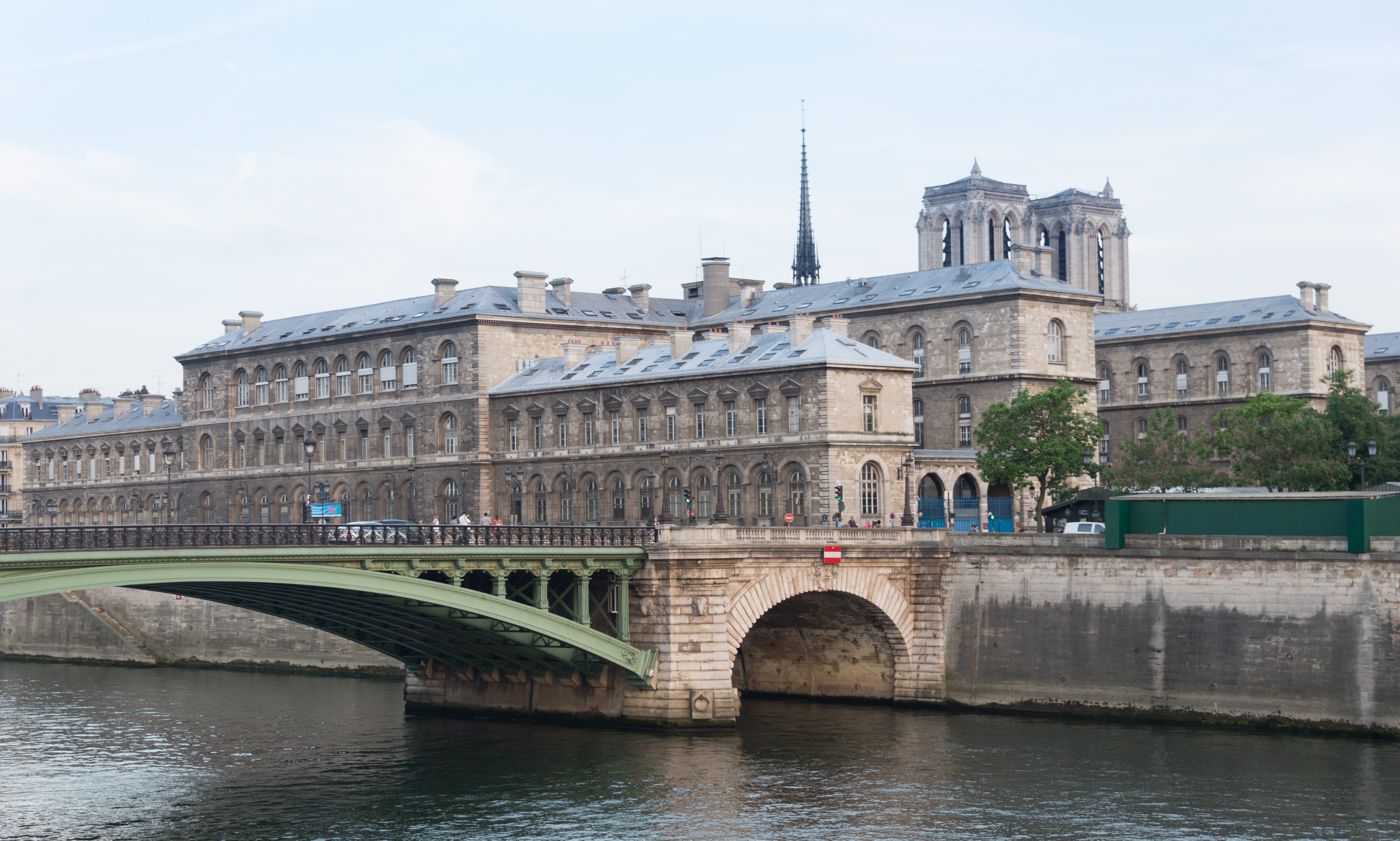
Hôtel-Dieu side facing the Seine

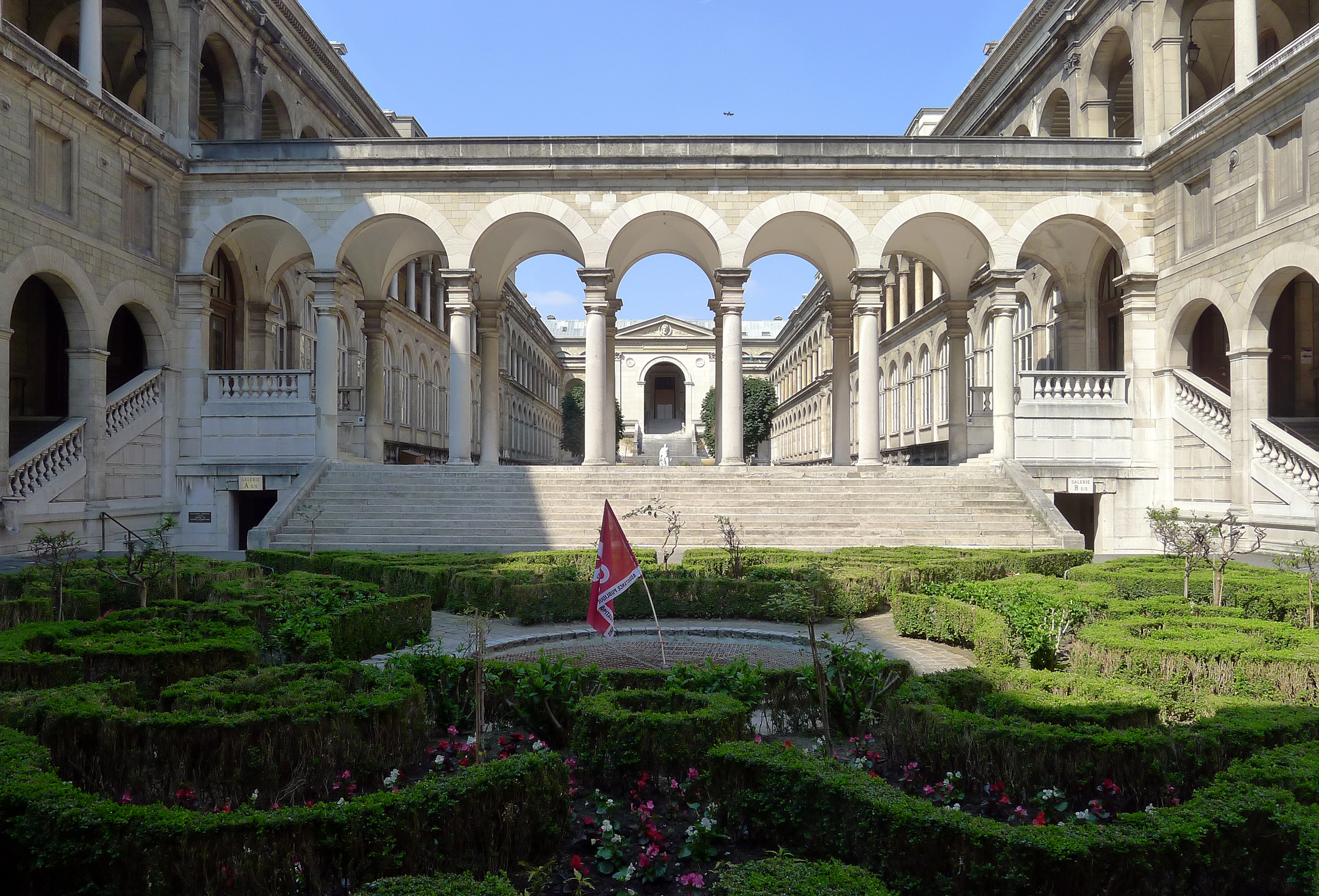
Inner court of the Hôtel-Dieu

The Hôtel-Dieu, located between the Parvis of Notre-Dame on the south and the Quai de la Corse on the north, is the oldest hospital in Paris. It is reputed to be the oldest still-functioning hospital in the world. Tradition says it was founded in 651 by Saint Landry, Bishop of Paris. It was originally located on the other side of the Parvis, along the river, with a second building on the left Bank of the Seine. The old hospital was famous for its overcrowding, with several patients in each bed. It was rebuilt several times. During the French Revolution it was renamed the "House of Humanity", in keeping with the secular principles of the revolution. The present hospital was begun by Napoleon III in 1863 and completed in 1877. The design, in an Italian Renaissance style, was by the architect Arthur-Stanislas Diet. It has several buildings, connected by porticos. Until 1908, care in the hospital was provided by nuns; now it is part of the network of Paris public hospitals.

Historical buildings close to the same site included the Hospice of Found Children, built in 1670, where new-born babies could be abandoned without explanation at any hour of the day or night. It received up to eight thousand children a year before the French Revolution.

=== The Canons' Quarter ===
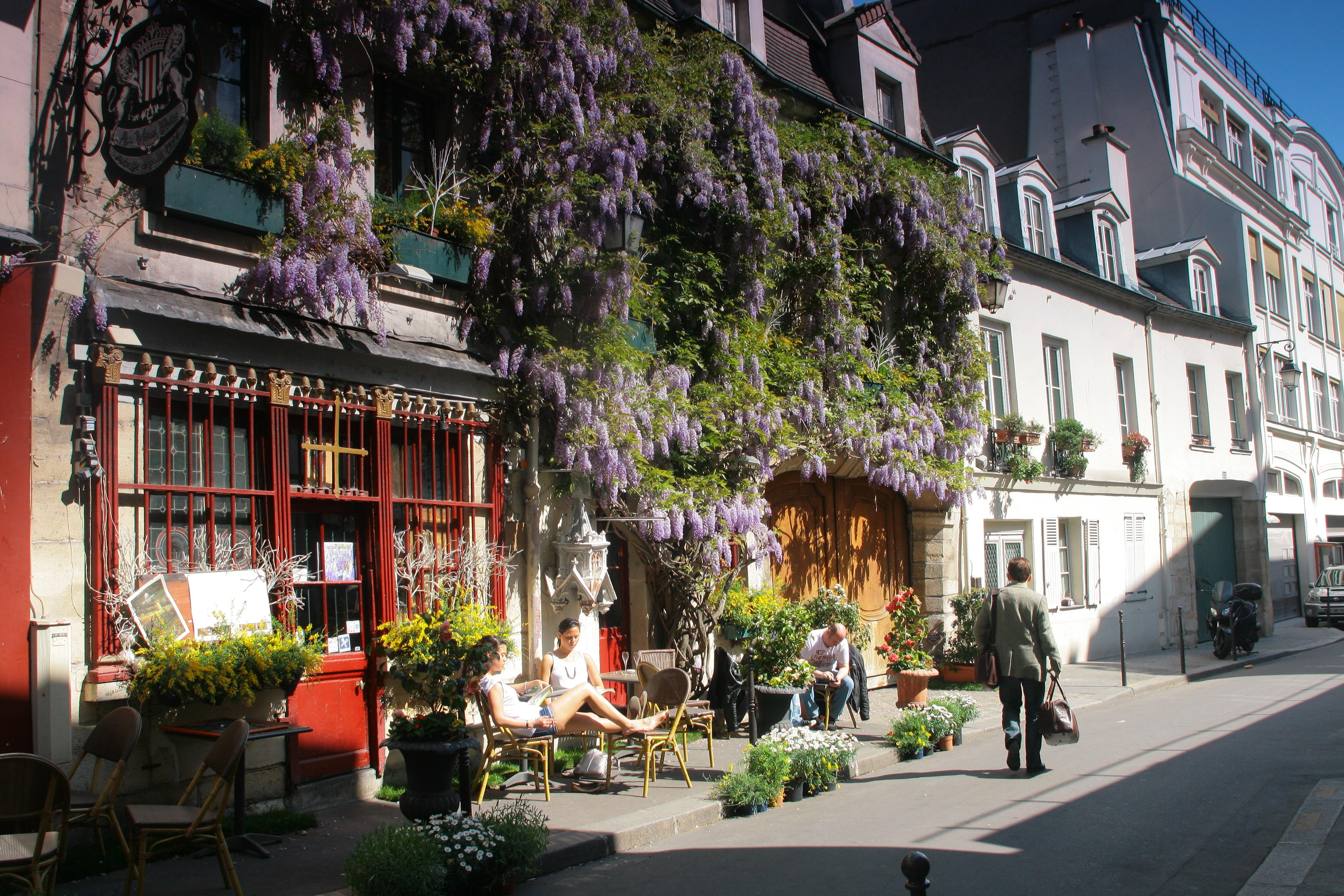
A canon's house at 24 Rue Chanoinesse, built in 1512

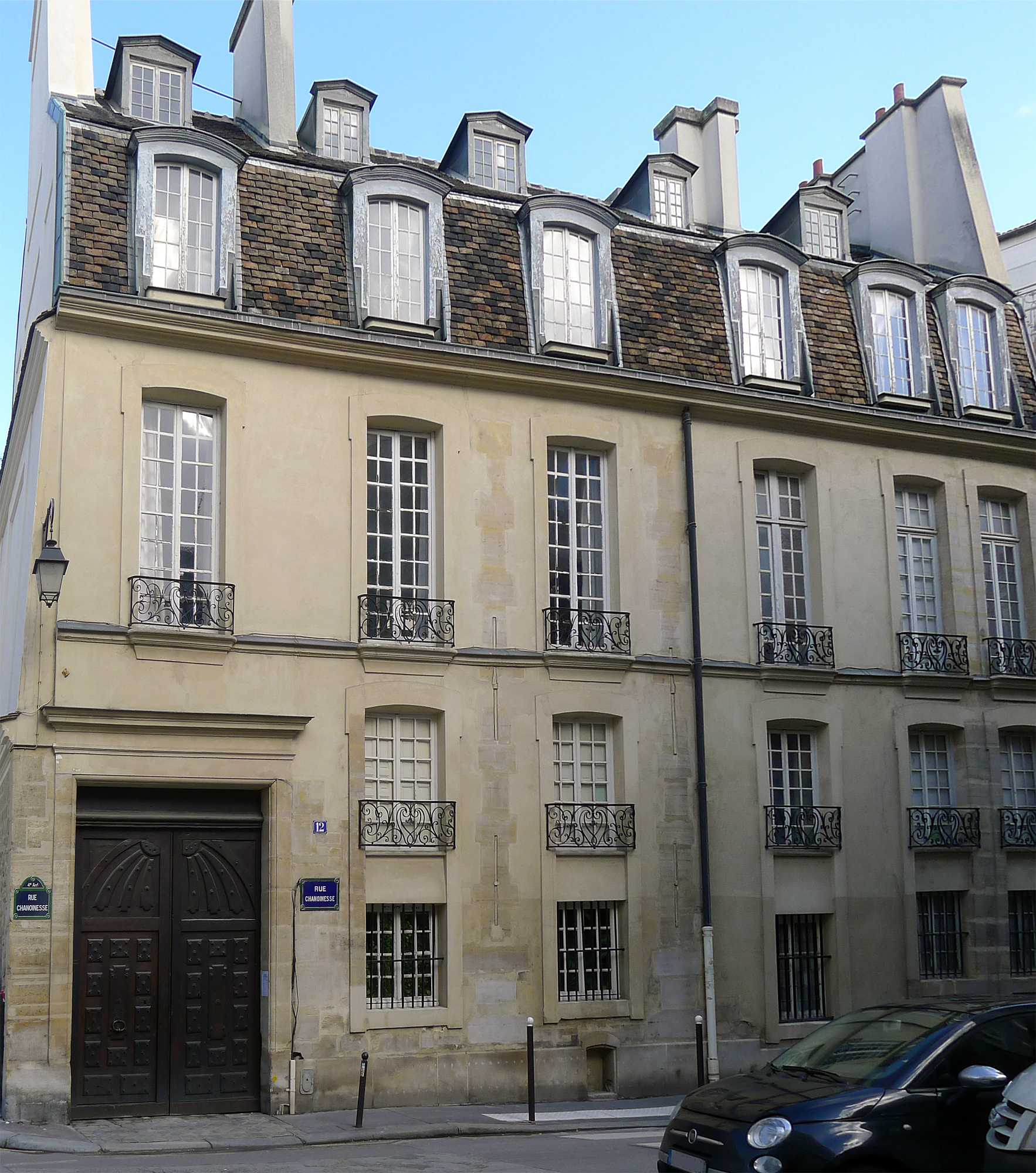
A canon's house from 16th c. at no. 12 rue Chanoinesse

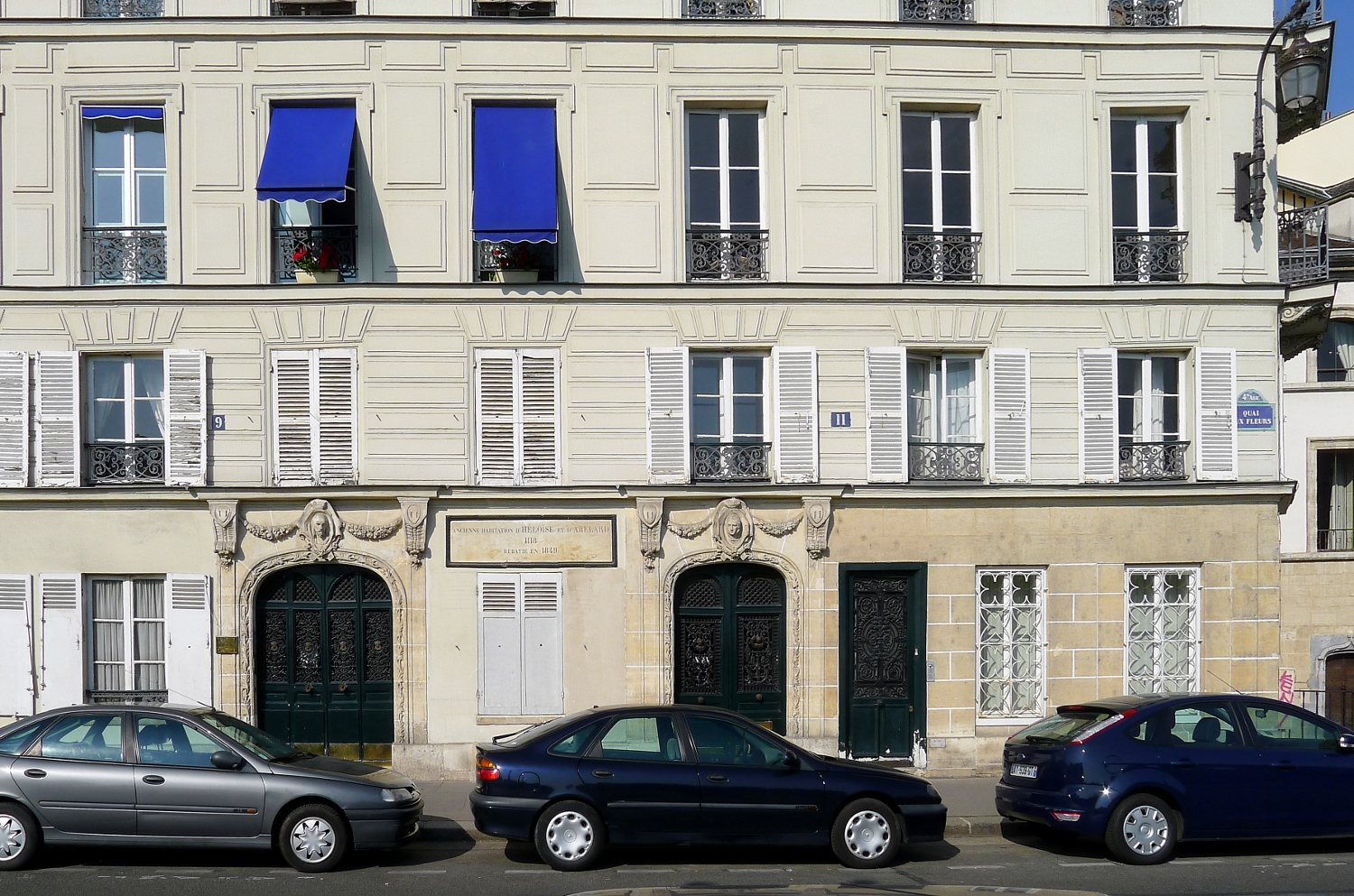
9 Quai aux Fleurs, Site of the home of Heloise in the tragic love story of Peter Abelard and Héloïse

Most of the very old residential quarters on the island were destroyed by Napoleon III and Baron Haussmann in the 19th century. Only one small area remains: the Canons' Quarter (Quartier des Chainoines), located between the Quai aux Fleurs, the rue d'Arcole and the rue du Cloitre-Notre Dame. In the 16th century it was the residence of many of the canons of the cathedral. It was closed to the outside world by gates, no commerce was permitted, and no women were allowed except those of "respectable age". Several residences remain from this period; the house at 24 rue Chanoinesse, from about 1512, has large doors leading to an interior courtyard and dormer windows jutting up from the roof. It is now covered with wisteria. Another good example is found at 12 Rue Chanoinesse.

One celebrated inhabitant of the neighborhood was the playwright Jean Racine, who lived on the second floor in the courtyard of the house at 7 rue des Ursines between 1672 and 1677. Another famous resident was Héloïse, the daughter of a canon named Fulbert, who lived at 9 Quai aux Fleurs. She was seduced by her philosophy teacher, Peter Abelard, in 1418. In what became one of the most celebrated romantic tragedies in French history, she secretly married Abelard; her furious father had him arrested and castrated. Both Abelard and Heloise finished their lives living in monasteries. The original house of Héloïse was demolished in 1849, but the present house has a plaque commemorating its role in the tragic story.

=== Quai de l'Horloge and the Palace of Justice ===
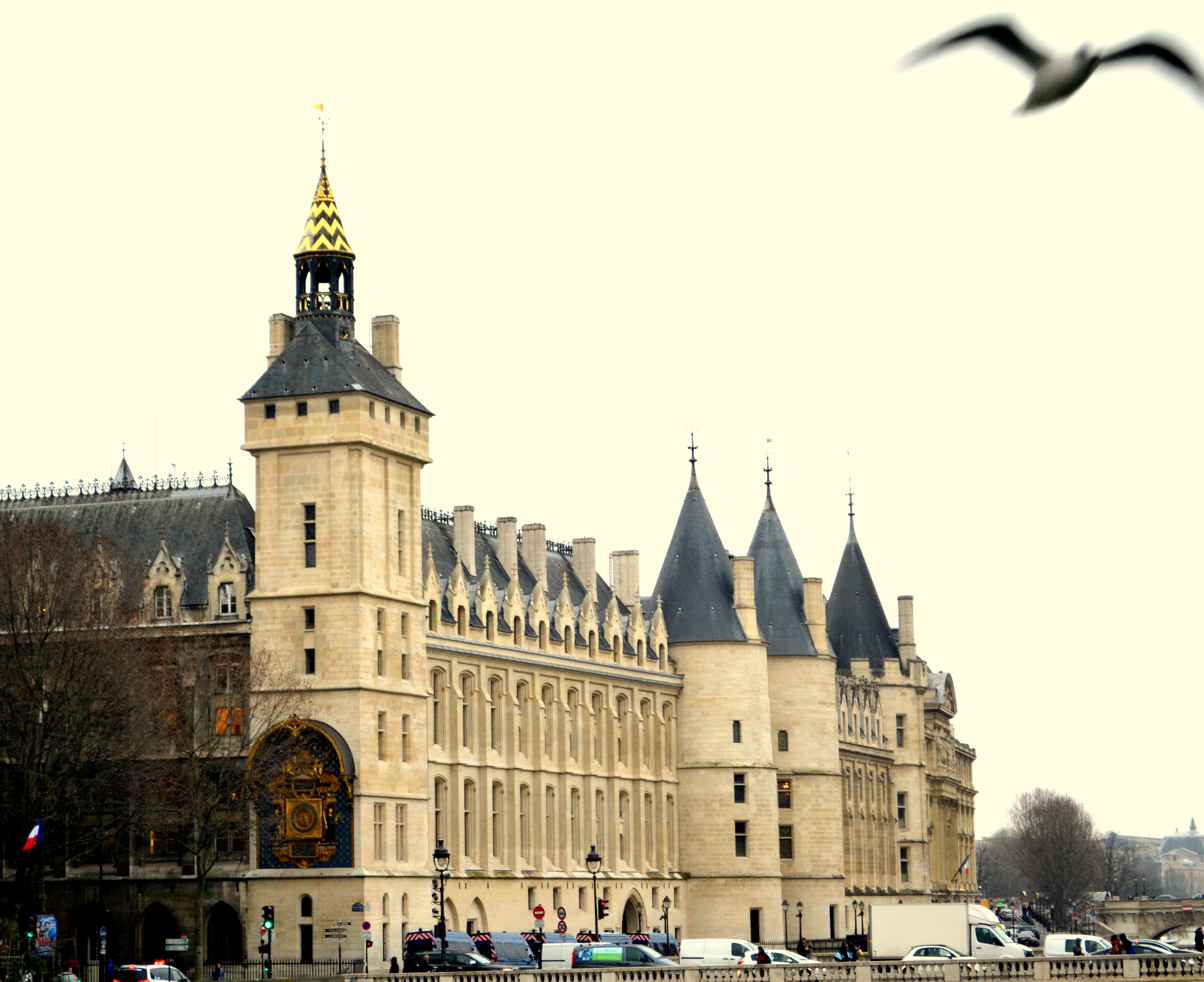
The tower of the Horloge with its belfry

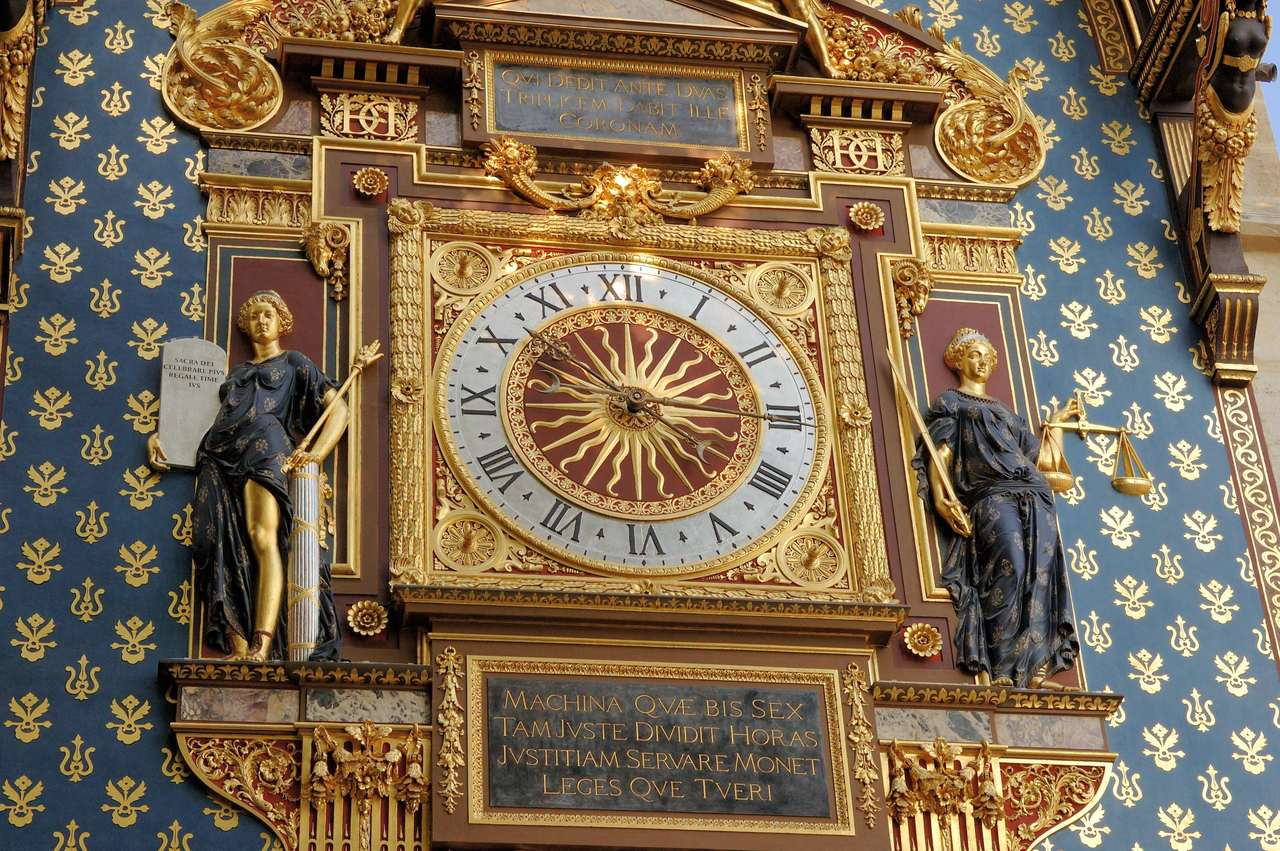
Clock of the Tower of the Horloge

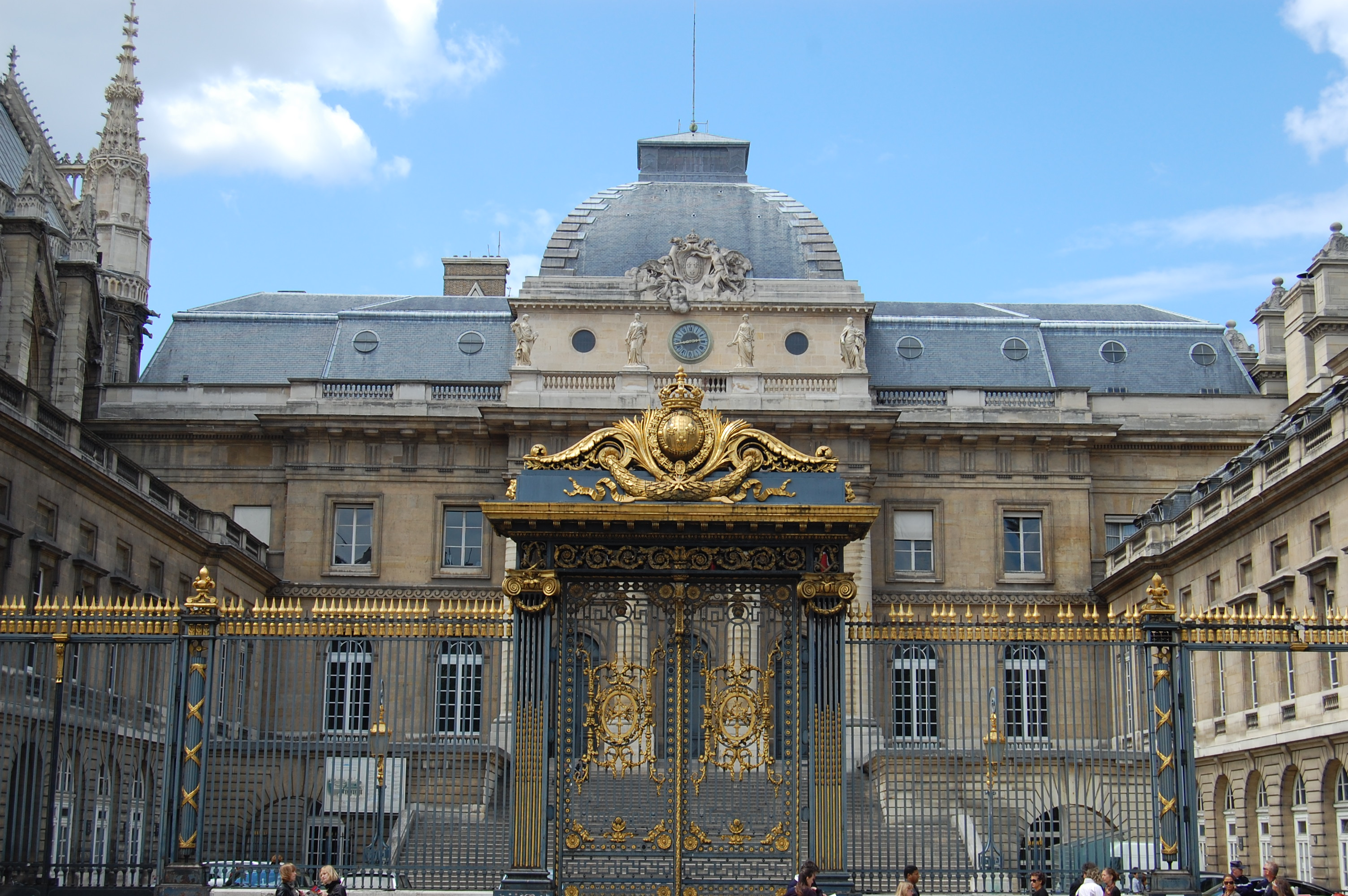
Court of Honor of the Palace of Justice

The old royal palace lay along the Quai de l'Horloge, on the northeast side of the island. With the departure of the kings of France to the Louvre and then to Versailles, the palace gradually was transformed into the judicial centre of the Kingdom, containing the courts, administrative offices and a prison.

The Quai de l'Horloge takes its name from the clock in the tower on the northeastern corner of the palace. The tower was built between 1350 and 1353 as a watchtower. When it was constructed, it was directly on the Seine. The stone walls of the Quai de l'Horloge, built beginning in 1611, created space for a road. The first clock was ordered by Charles V, and faced the interior of the palace. In 1418 it was given an outside face, toward the city, and became the first municipal clock of Paris. In the 16th century, Henry III had the clock redecorated with sculpture by the French Renaissance sculptor Germain Pilon. The tower was originally topped by a silver bell, rung only to announce the death of the king or the birth of his heir. It was also rung on 24 August 1572, at the beginning of the St. Bartholomew's Day Massacre, to signal the beginning of the attack on the Protestants of Paris. The original bell was melted down during the French Revolution, but was replaced in 1848. The gilding of the clock was restored in 2012.

During the French Revolution, the attic on the top floor between the Silver Tower and Bonbec Tower was the home of Antoine Quentin Fouquier-Tinville, the chief prosecutor of the Revolutionary Tribunal. He lived there with his wife and twins while conducting the trials in the lower courtroom which sent more than two thousand prisoners to the guillotine.

Most of the facade along the Seine on the Quai de l'Horloge was rebuilt in the Neo-Gothic style in the 19th century. The exceptions are the three towers that follow the tower of the Horloge, which date to about 1300, in the reign of Philip IV. The Tower of Caesar and the Silver Tower flank the gateway. The Tower of Caesar was built on a Gallo-Roman foundation, while the Silver Tower served as the royal treasury. The third and oldest tower - the only one with tooth-like crenellations around the top - is the Tower Bonbec. It was built by Louis IX, at the same time as the Sainte-Chapelle. Beginning in the 15th century it contained the torture chamber of the palace. For this reason its name was reputed to come from the expression "Bon Bec", or "To quickly untie the tongue".

The parts of the palace further west were constructed under Napoleon III in the neo-classical style, with Corinthian pillars. The buildings were gradually taken over entirely by the judicial function. They now house the highest court in France: the Court of Appeals, created in 1790. The various buildings of the Palais de Justice cover about a third of the island, and at their peak employed about four thousand employees. They are still occupied largely by the courts and offices of the justice system, though some functions have moved to a new building on the outskirts of Paris.

The main entrance is located on the Boulevard du Palais, behind a very elaborate wrought-iron gate. The main entrance dates to 1783–87, and features a grand staircase and classical peristyle. Until the 1840s, the entry courtyard was also occupied by the stalls of merchants, making it extremely lively.

The older portion of the building, the Conciergerie, was turned into a state prison from about 1370, as the Kings moved out to live elsewhere. The original entrance to the building was on what is now the first floor, since the street level was gradually raised. Within the entrance is a very large Gothic hall, with four naves divided by rows massive pillars, which was originally known as the Hall of the Men-at-Arms. It was used primarily as a dining hall for the two thousand employees in the King's service. Four stairways originally reached upward to the grand ceremonial hall on the first floor, where the Parliament met and court festivities were held. Most of this floor was destroyed by fire in 1618, but some vestiges remain, including pieces of the enormous black marble table that was a centrepiece of the hall. They now hang on the south wall of the lower chamber.

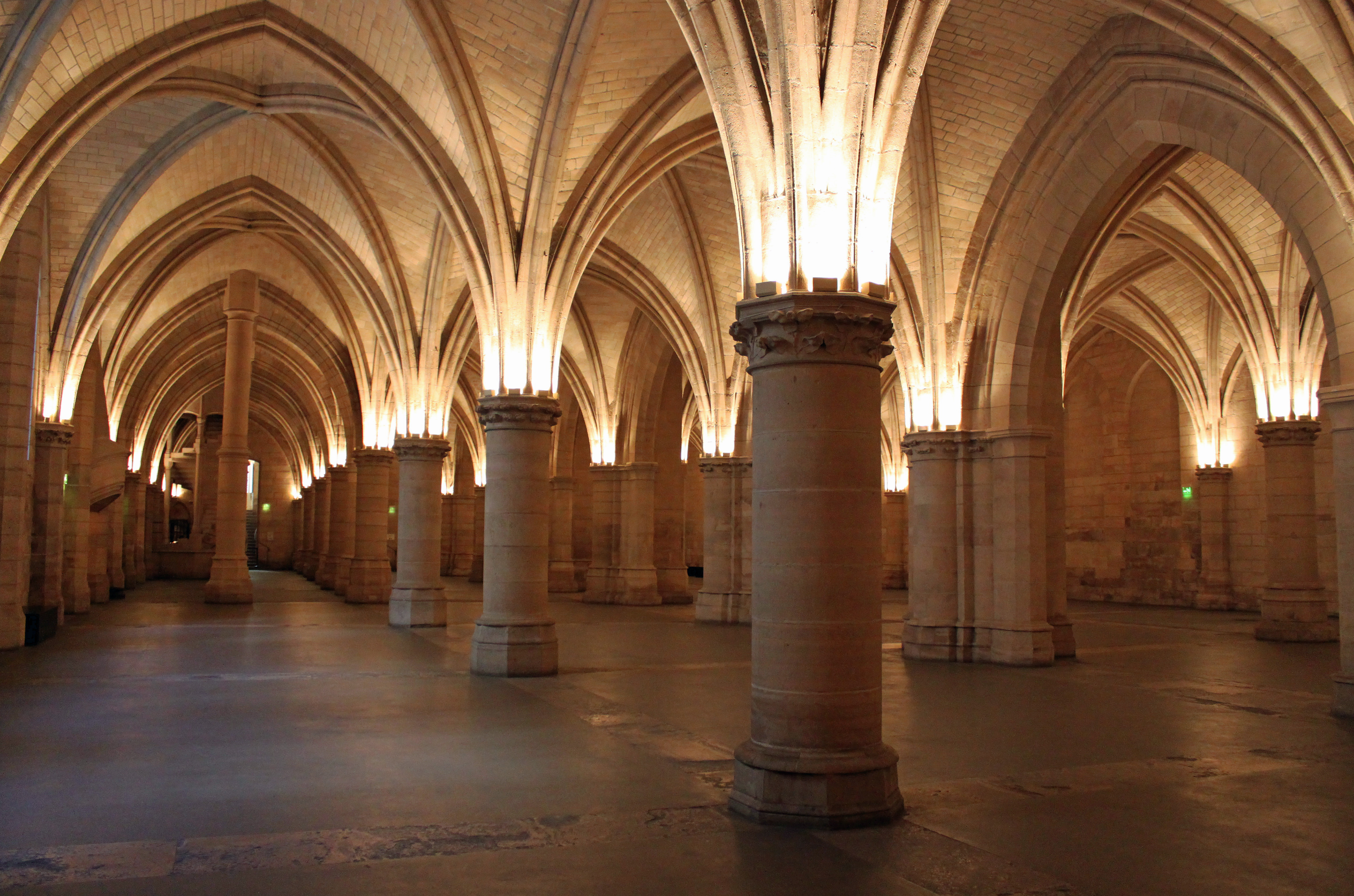
The Gothic Hall of the Men at Arms

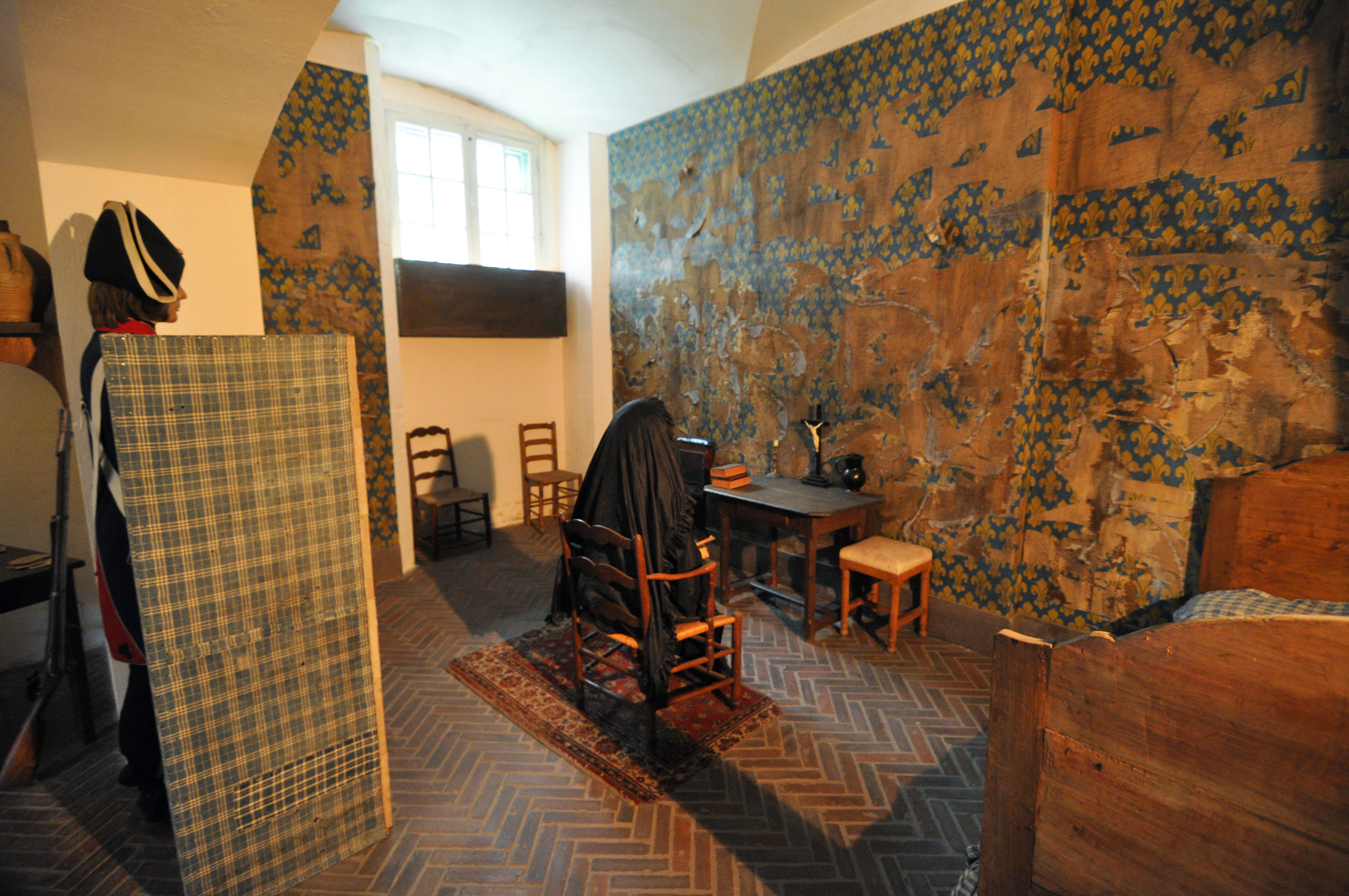
The recreated cell of Marie-Antoinette

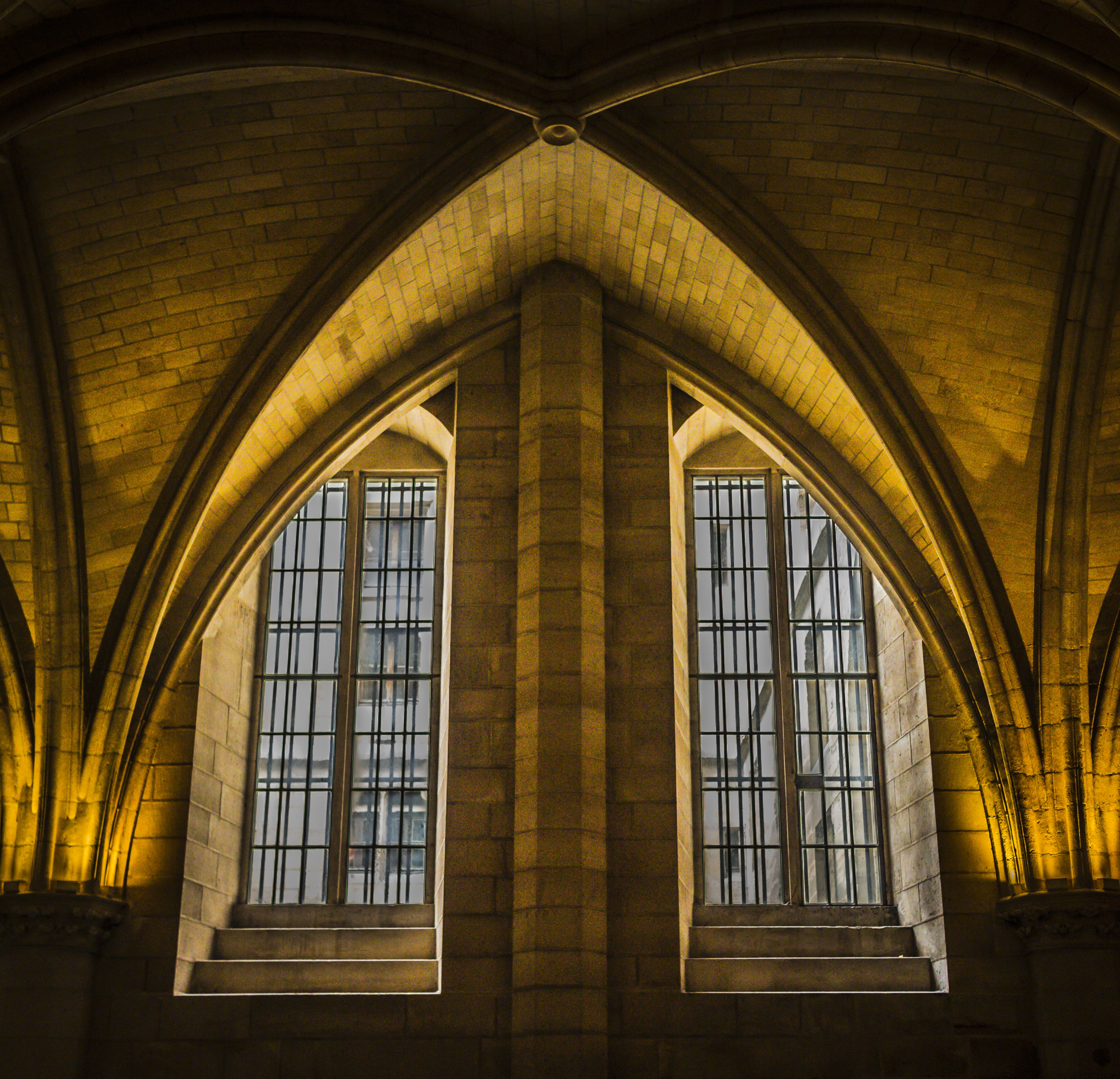
Gateways of the Hall of the Men at Arms

The residence of the king originally adjoined this part of the Palace, but its last remains were destroyed in the fires set by the Paris Commune in 1871. All that remains of his residence is the Guards' Hall: originally, an antechamber to the residence. From the west side of the back wall runs a passage known as the "Rue de Paris"; it was used by the royal executioner, nicknamed "Monsieur de Paris".

A few portions of the old prison, which was in use from 1370 to 1914, still exist. The Revolutionary Tribunal was established on the first floor of the Palace of Justice from September 1793 until the fall of Maximilien Robespierre in 1794. The prisoners were crowded into common cells, and were not told of the specific charge against them until the day before the trial. The public prosecutor, Fouquier-Tinville, prepared execution sentences in advance with the names left blank - to speed the court procedure. After very rapid trials with little opportunity for defence, the tribune sent thousands of prisoners to the guillotine. Convicted prisoners were usually executed the day after their trial. They had their necks shaved and their collars widened, and were taken in cartloads of ten or twelve prisoners to the Place de la Revolution (today's Place de la Concorde) for execution. In all, two thousand, seven hundred and eighty people were convicted and executed in this manner. Reconstructions of some of the cells can be seen today.

The best-known victim of this process was Queen Marie Antoinette, who was held at the Conciergerie for seventy-six days: from 2 August until 16 October 1793. She was confined to a small cell where she was watched day and night by two guards until her trial. The following day, she was taken on a cart to her execution, along a street lined with thirty thousand soldiers and crowds of jeering Parisians. After the Restoration of the monarchy, in 1816, her original cell was transformed into a chapel. Another cell nearby, very similar to her original cell, gives visitors an idea of her final days.

=== The Sainte-Chapelle ===
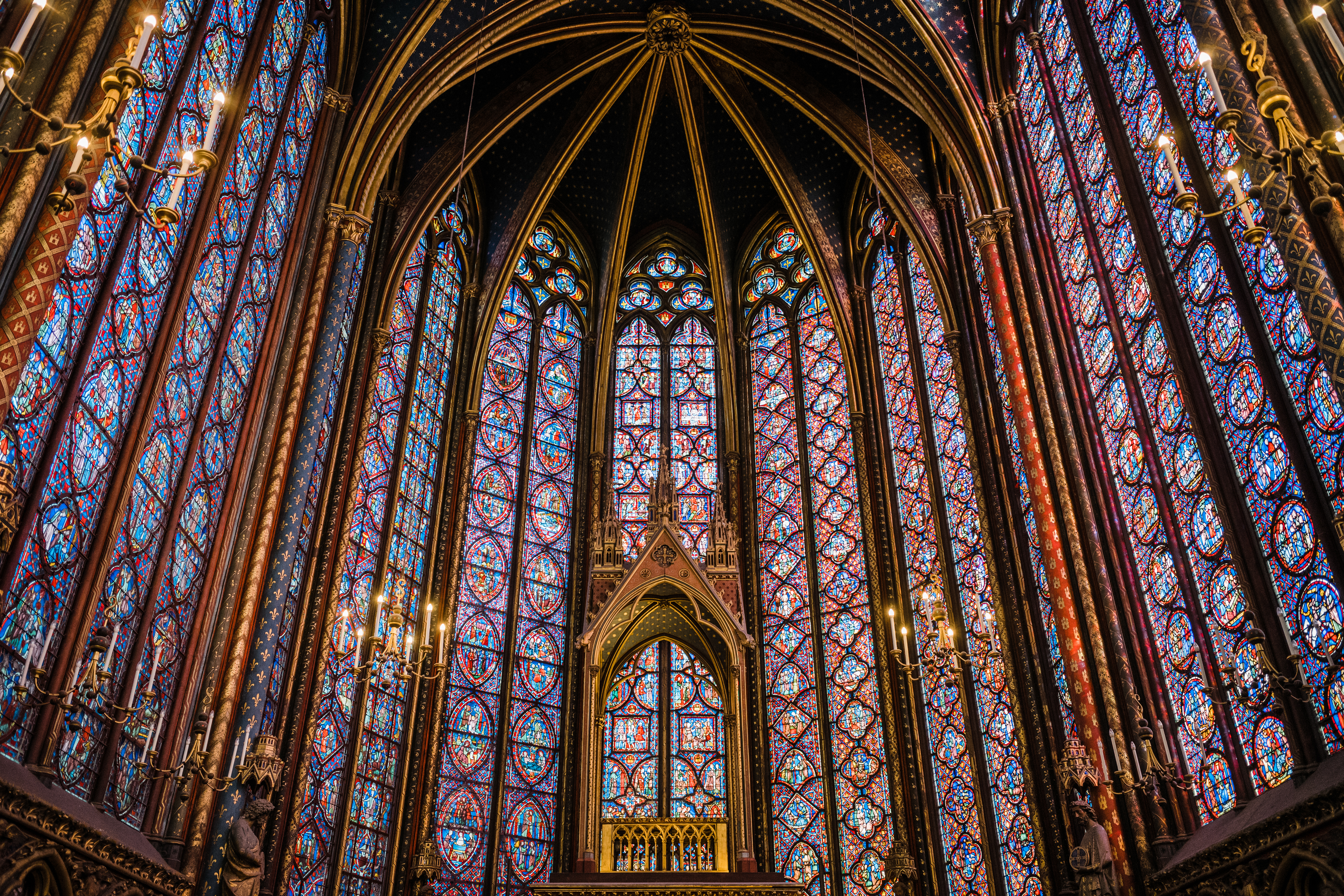
Upper chapel of the Sainte-Chapelle

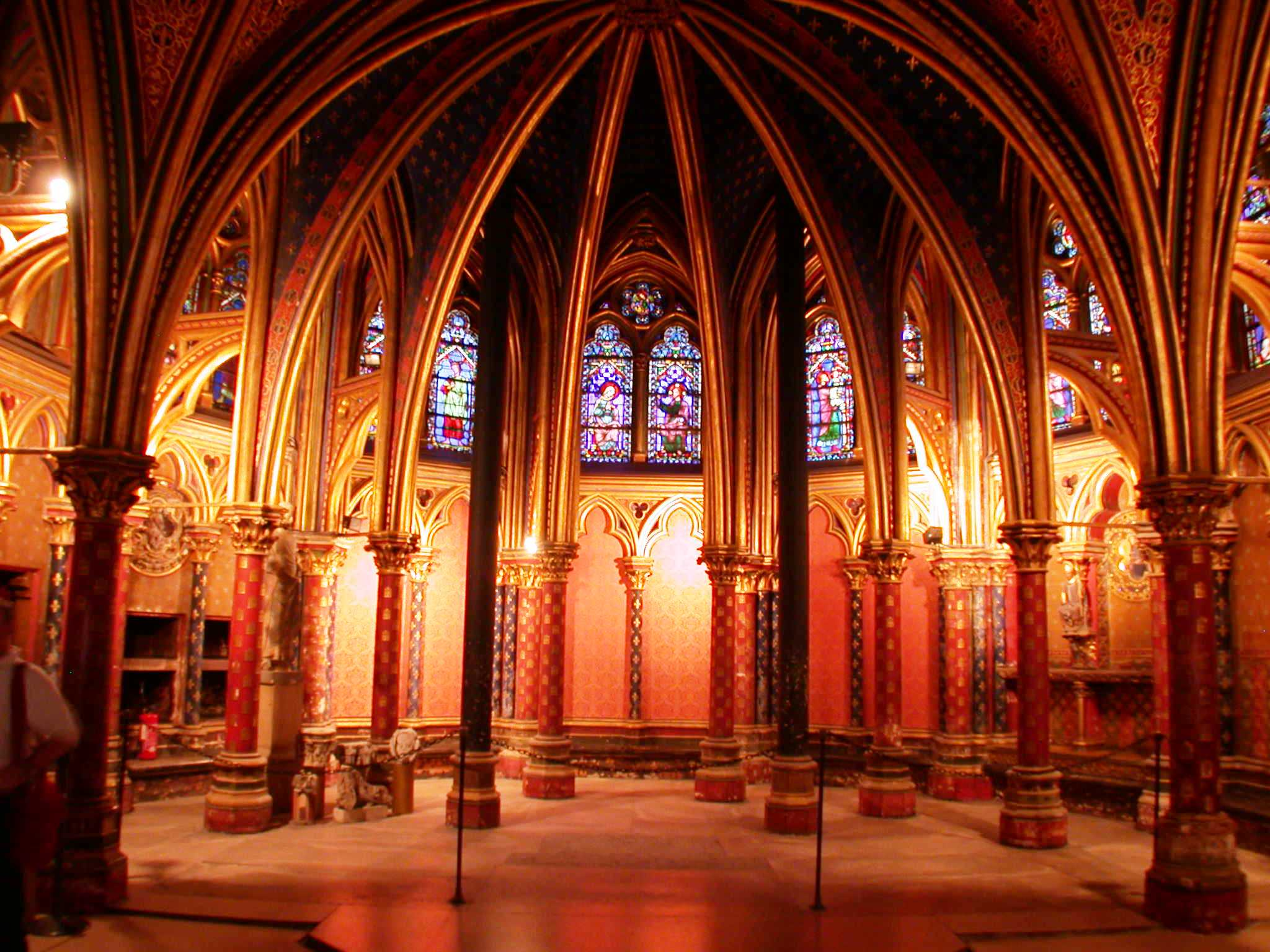
The lower chapel

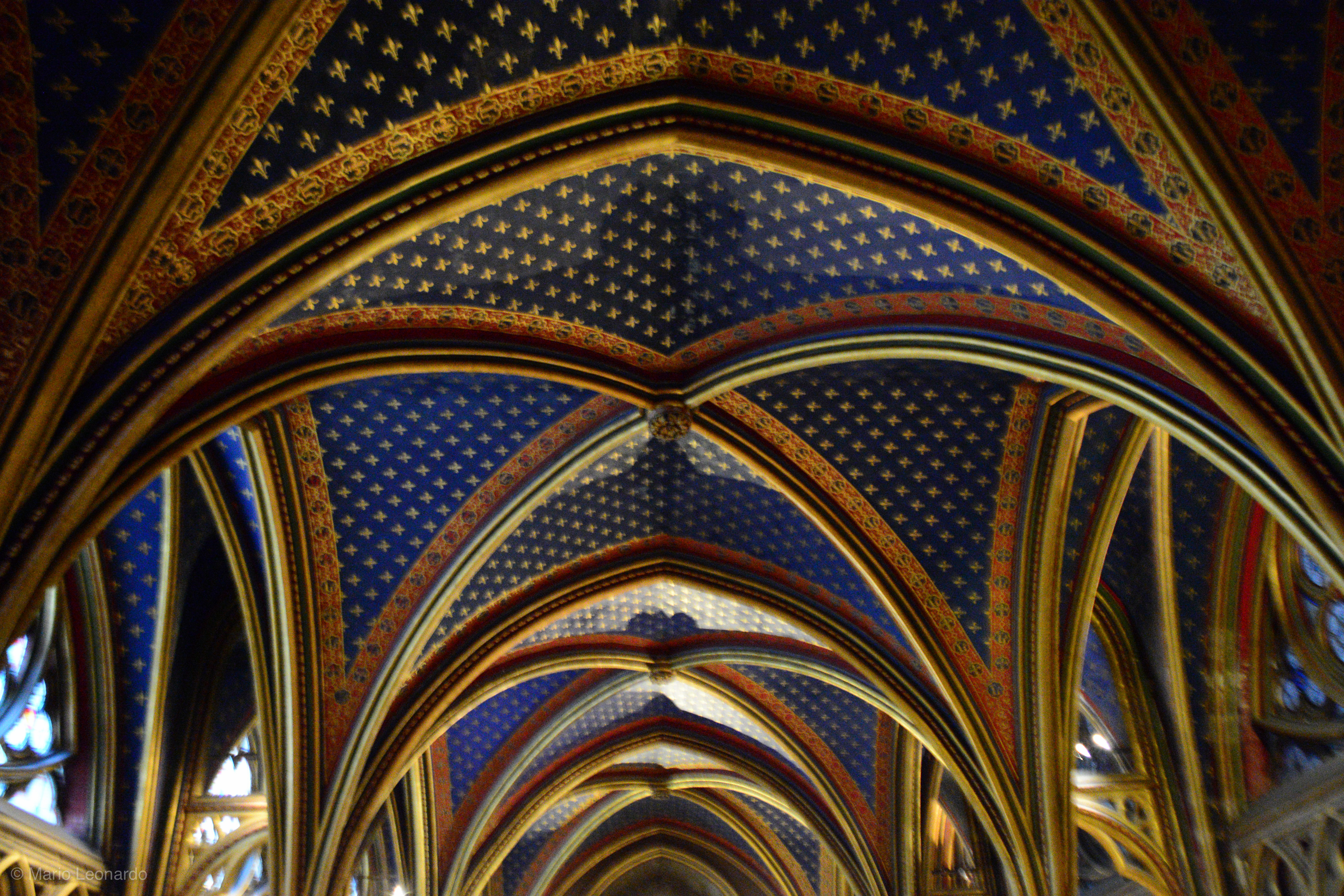
The ceiling of the lower chapel

The Sainte-Chapelle was the royal chapel, located in the courtyard of the palace. It was created by Louis IX (later Saint Louis) to display sacred relics of the Crucifixion; particularly the Crown of Thorns that he purchased in 1239 from the Emperor of Constantinople. He later added what was believed to be a fragment of the true cross. Work was already underway by 1241, and it was consecrated in 1248.

The Sainte-Chapelle measured 42.5 metres (139 ft) high – not counting the spire – which ranked it with the major cathedrals of the time. By comparison, the nave of Notre-Dame de Paris is 35 metres (115 ft) high. The current spire is 33 metres (108 ft) high, but it is not original. In fact, it is the fifth spire to adorn the Sainte-Chapelle. It was made in 1852–53, following the model of the 15th-century spire. The 19th-century sculpture, inspired by medieval models, was cast in lead by Geoffrey-Dechaume.

The great treasure of The Sainte-Chapelle is the 13th century stained glass windows; the glass was thicker than later windows, and consequently the colors were deeper and richer, with reds and blues predominant. There are more than thirteen hundred small panels of stained glass, each containing a biblical scene. More than two-thirds of the original stained glass survived, including fifteen Early Gothic windows from the 13th century and the later Gothic rose window from the 15th century. The upper portion of the chapel, where the relics were displayed, was reserved for the royal family, while the ground floor was used by the courtiers and servants of the court.

The chapel suffered major damage during the French Revolution. Afterwards, it was turned into a storehouse of documents for the neighbouring Ministry of Justice.

=== Quai des Orfèvres ===
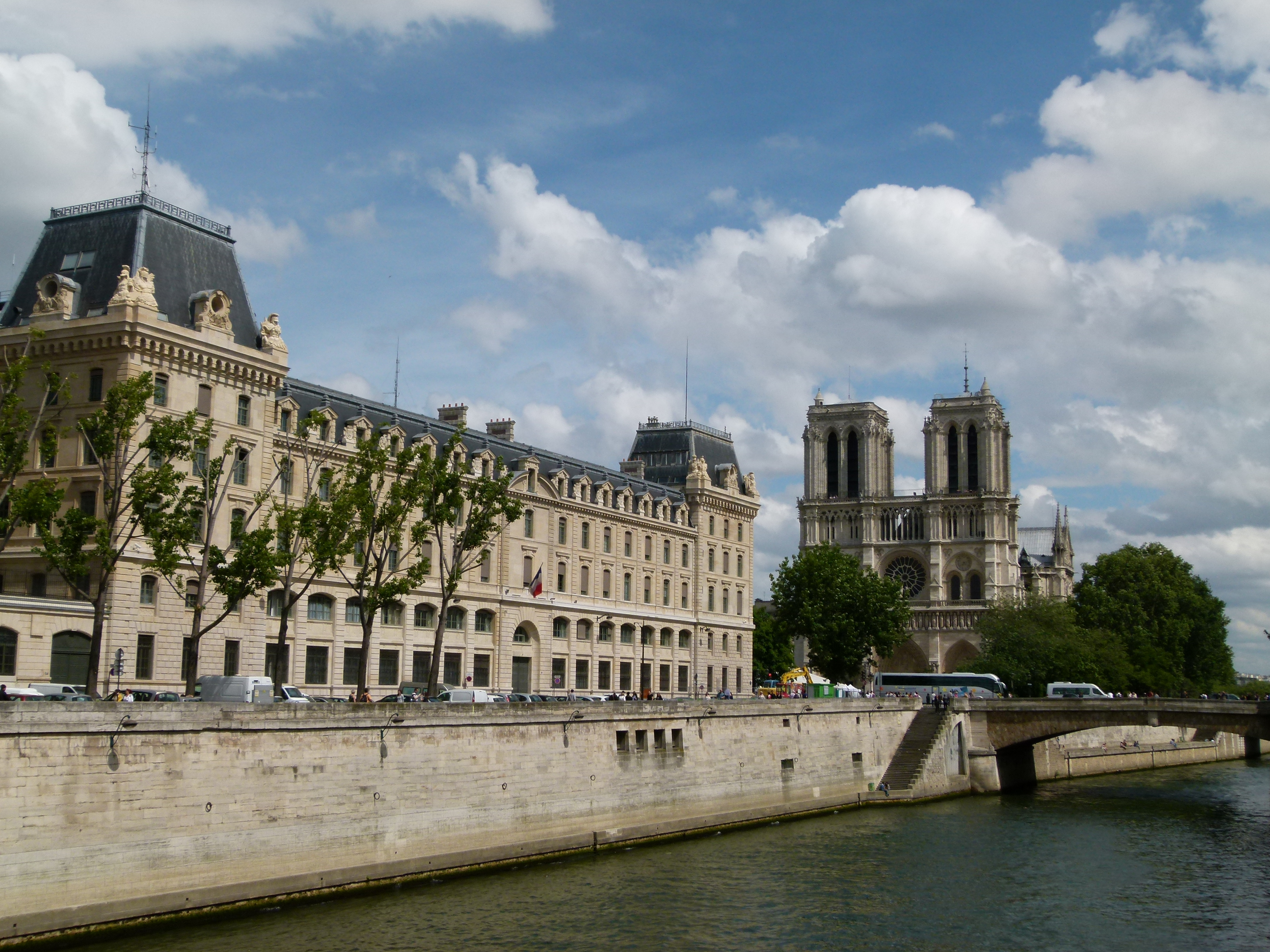
Prefecture of Police on the Quai des Orfèvres

The Quai des Orfèvres, "The Quay of the Goldmsiths and Silversmiths", is on the southwestern side of the island, alongside the Palace of Justice and the Place Dauphine. In its earlier days, a poultry market was held here; as a result policemen were referred to by the slang term "poulets" or "chickens". Its current name dates from the 17th and 18th centuries, when many celebrated Paris jewellers had their shops here; including Boehmer and Bassenge - who made a famous necklace for Marie-Antoinette - and Georg Friedrich Strass, who invented both the rhinestone and the simulated diamond.

The jewellers' shops have since disappeared, but the street is notable for the imposing office building at 36 Quai de Orfèvres. Constructed between 1875 et 1880 by architects Émile Jacques Gilbert and Arthur-Stanislas Diet, it replaced an earlier building of the President of the Court of Appeals of Paris, which was destroyed by the Paris Commune in 1871. As the home of the Direction régionale de la police judiciaire de la préfecture de police de Paris (Directorate of the Judicial Police of the Paris Prefecture), its address featured in the titles of several very popular French films and detective novels. The fictional detective Inspector Jules Maigret, created by Georges Simenon, had his office here. The police moved out, to the rue Bastion in the 17th Arrondissement, in 2017.

=== The Rue de Harlay and the Cour de Cassation of the Palais de Justice ===
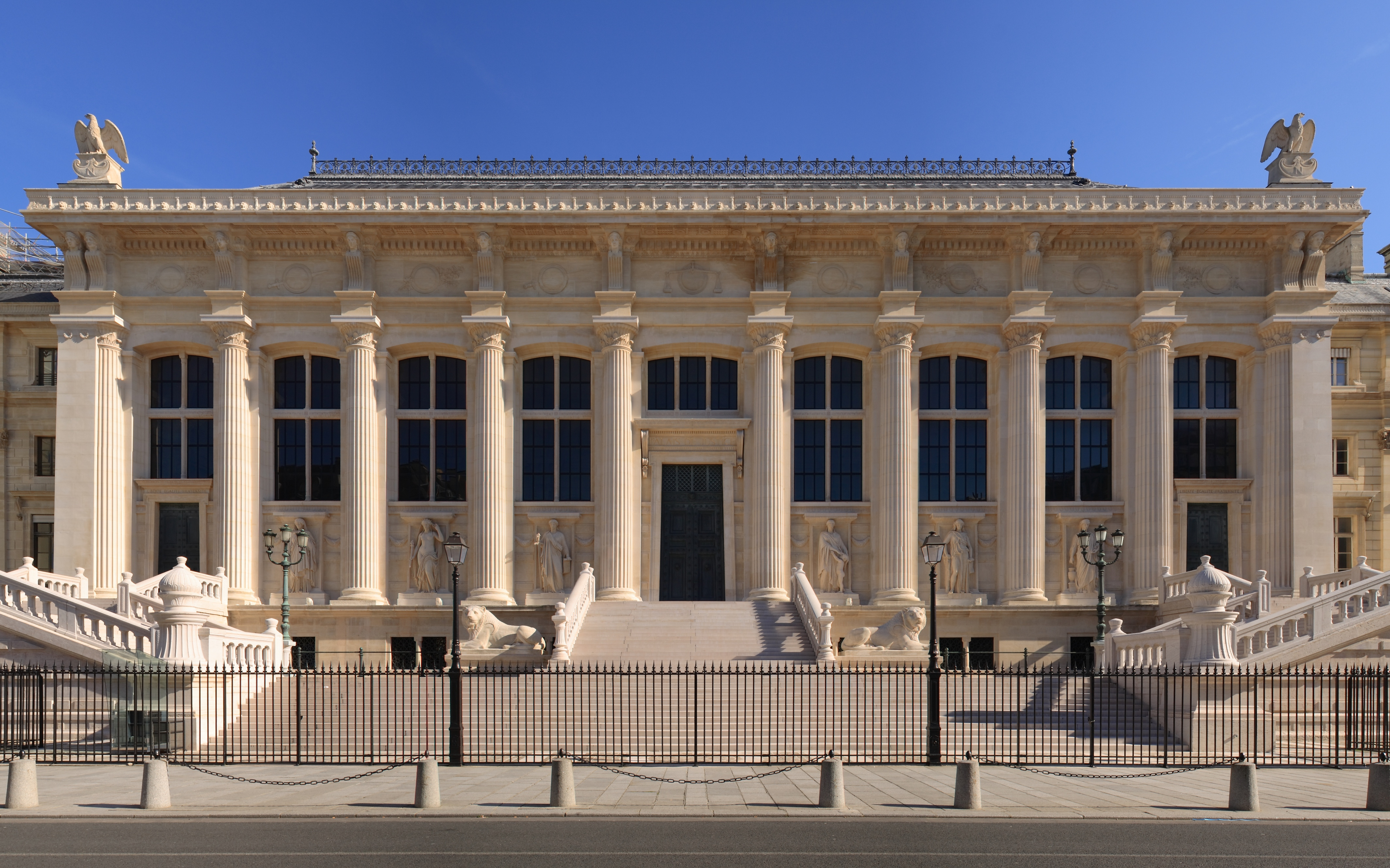
The Cour de Cassation of the Palais de Justice, on the Rue de Harlay

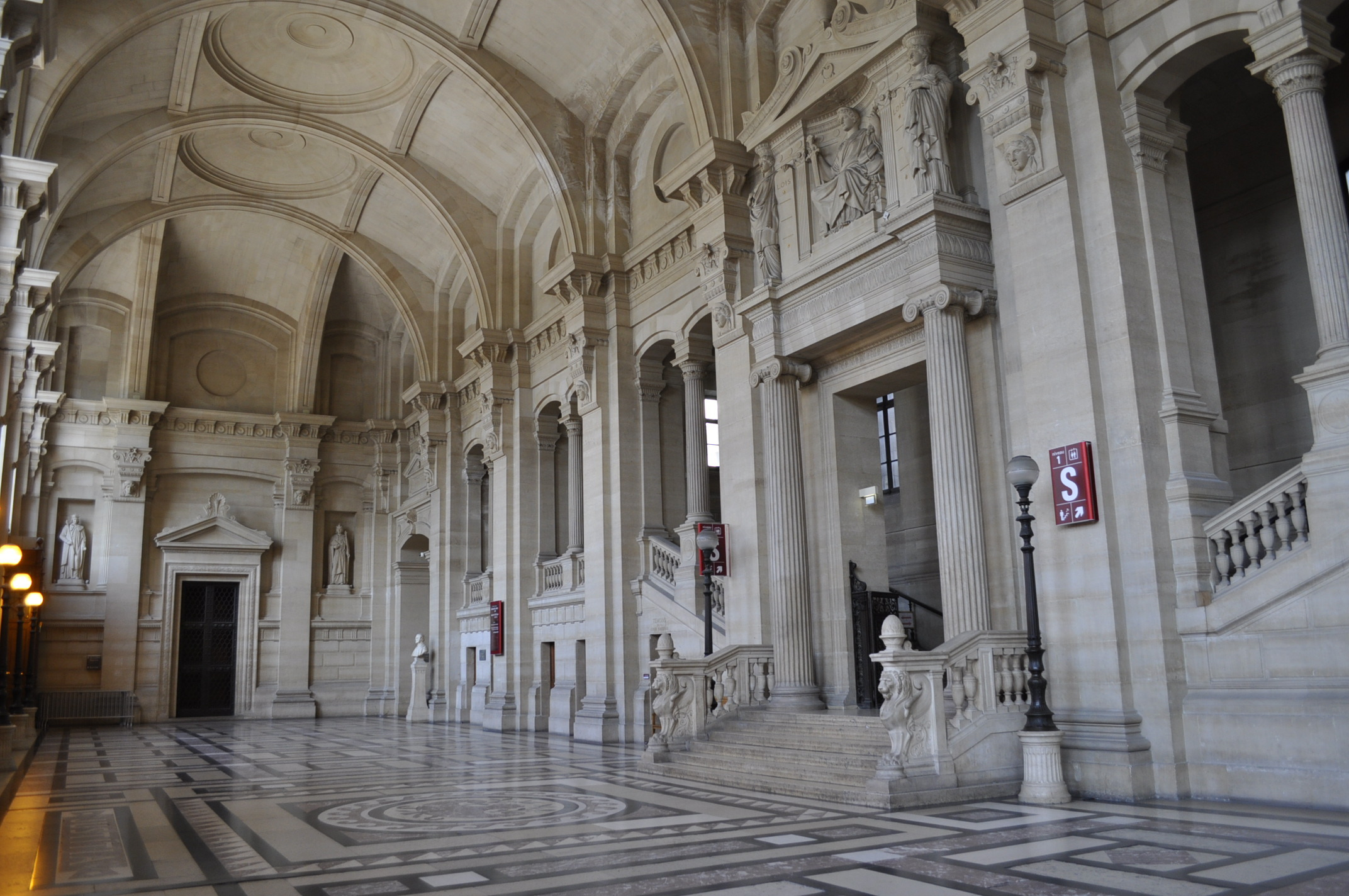
Hall of the Pas Perdu, Vestibule of the Palais de Justice, Rue de Harlay

Rue de Harlay runs across the island on the northwest side, separating the Palais de Justice from the Place Dauphine. It is named for Achille de Harlay, the first president of the Parlement of Paris in the early 17th century; his house stood in that location until it was demolished for the enlargement of the Palace of Justice. The building of the Cour de Cassation, a kind of French Supreme Court, looks over the Place Dauphine. Its highly theatrical facade was designed by Joseph-Louis Duc, whose other famous Paris work is the July Column in the Place de la Bastille. It features marble classical columns, pediments and bas-reliefs; there are sculpted lions on the grand stairways, eagles on the roof and statues of famous jurists in togas along the facade. Like the Paris Opera of the same period, it is in the style of Napoleon III. It was nearly completed in 1871 when Napoleon III was deposed. The Paris Commune set fire to the unfinished palace, partially destroying it; but it was later restored and completed.

One famous feature is the Hall of the "Pas Perdus", or "Last steps", where prisoners would be taken between the courtrooms and the prison.

=== Place Dauphine ===
The triangular Place Dauphine, at the downstream end of the island, was originally the garden of the royal palace. Known as "The King's Orchard", it was filled with vegetable gardens, fruit trees and flower beds. Beginning in 1609 King Henry IV turned it into a residential square, facing the palace, similar to the square he began at the Place des Vosges a few years earlier. It was named for his son, the Dauphin of France (the future Louis XIII). (Note: Place is feminine, not dauphin) He asked the president of the Parliament, Achille de Harlay to develop it. Twelve lots were sold, and forty-five irregularly sized houses were constructed behind a standardised façade. The houses were built of brick, with limestone quoins supported on arcaded stone ground floors and capped by steep slate roofs with dormers - similar to the façades of Place des Vosges. Each house had a ground floor of arcades occupied by shops; two floors of living space; and an attic with skylights.

There were originally two entrances to the Place Dauphine. One was at the downstream end, entering through a kind of gateway centred on paired pavilions facing the equestrian statue of Henry IV on the far side of the Pont Neuf. The second was in the centre of the eastern row of houses, which were badly damaged during the Paris Commune of 1871. Nearly all the buildings have been raised in height, given new façades, or replaced with modified versions of the originals. Notable residents of the Place included the film stars Yves Montand and Simone Signoret, who occupied 15 Place Dauphin - above a bookstore - from their wedding in 1952 until the death of Signoret in 1985.

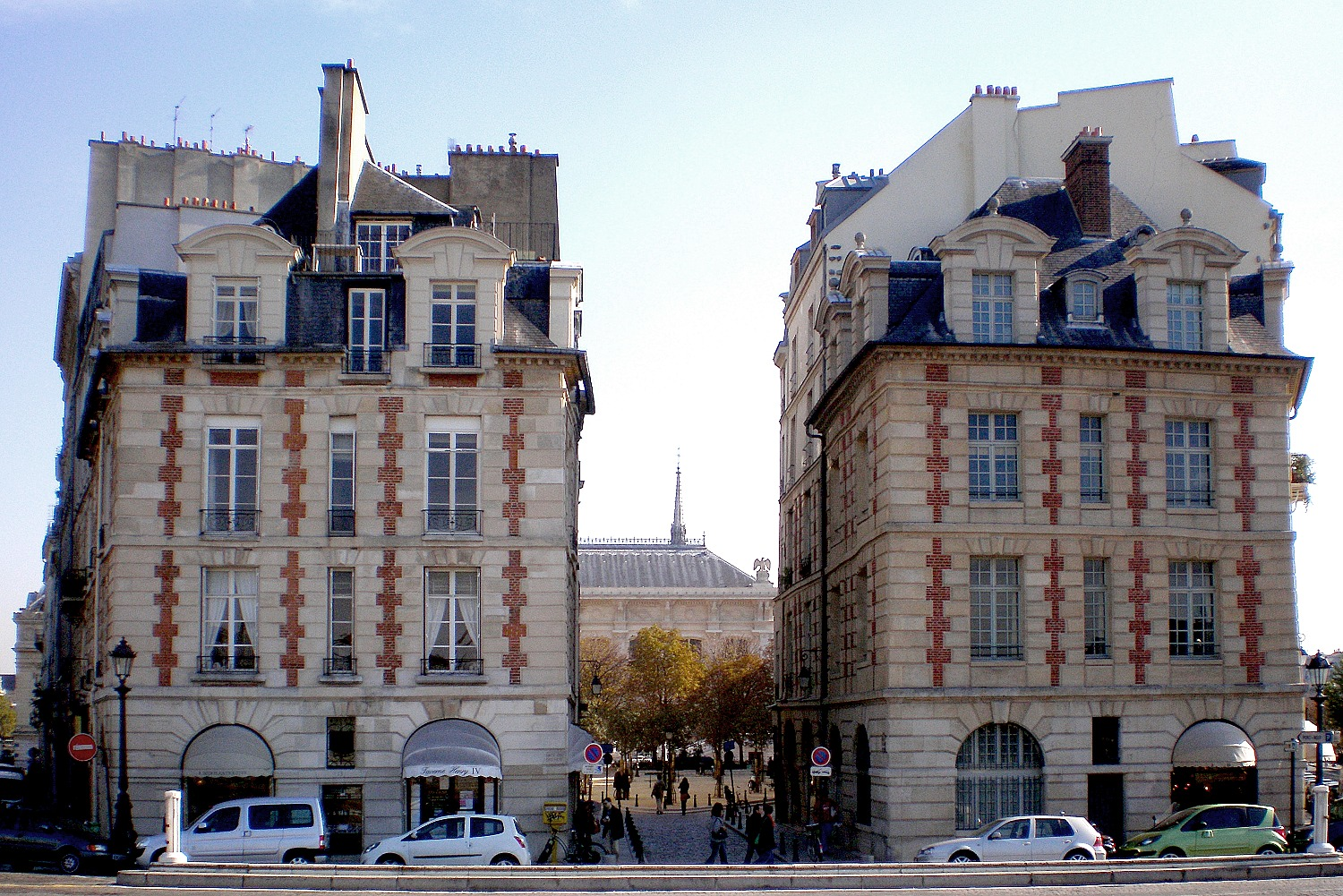
The entry to Place Dauphine

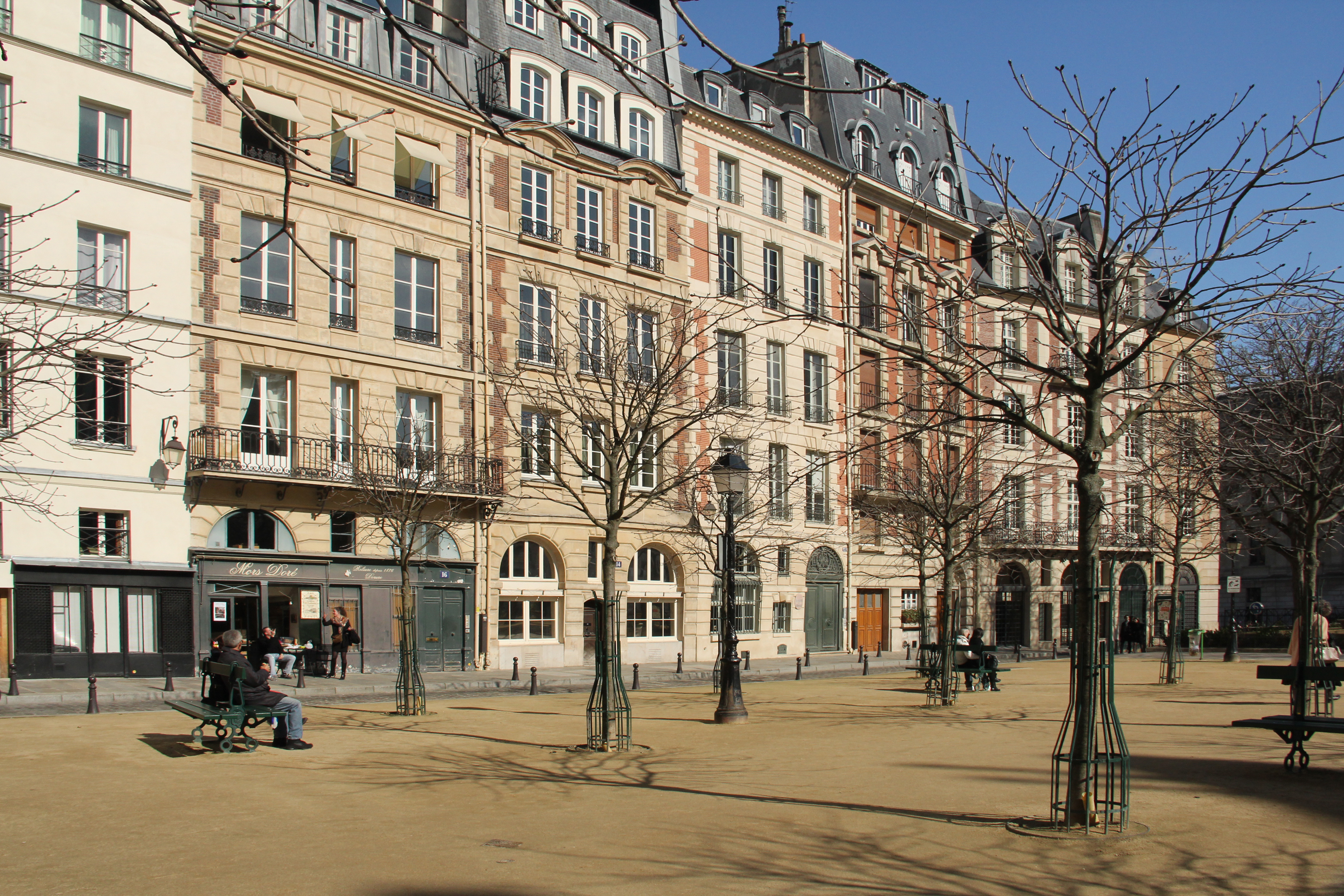
17th-century residences of Place Dauphine

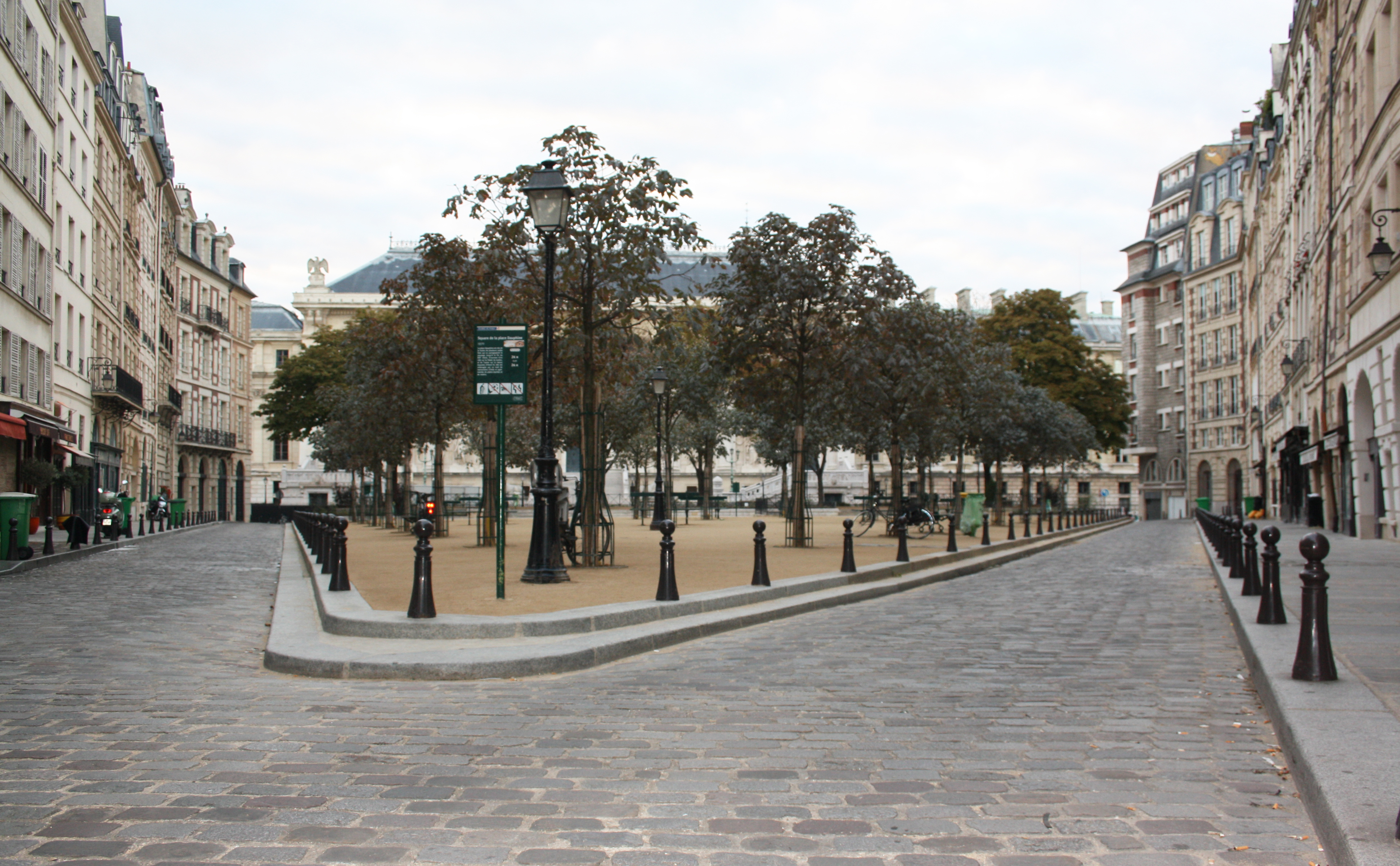
The small park of Place Dauphine

=== The Pont Neuf and the Square du Vert Galant ===
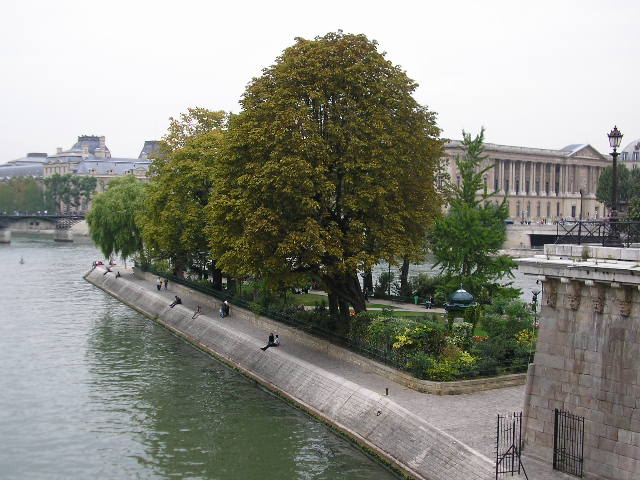
Square du Vert-Galant

The Pont Neuf, completed in 1606, was the first bridge in Paris to cross the entire length of the Seine, and the first that was not lined with houses. It was the project of Henry IV. After the assassination of the king in 1610, it became the site of another innovation: the first equestrian statue in Paris. Commissioned in 1614 by Marie de' Medici - the widow and regent of the king - it was modelled after the equestrian statues of her native Italy. Giambologna completed the commission in 1618. The statue was destroyed in 1792 during the French Revolution, but was replaced in 1817 by the royal sculptor François Lemot, using casts of the original.

At the time that the statue was installed on the bridge, it stood at the very tip of island. In 1884 the end of the island was extended over a sandbar with the construction of new quays, and planted with trees. This became the new Square of Vert-Galant. Its name comes from the king's nickname as an admirer of women. The triangular park has some of the finest views of the buildings along both sides of the Seine.

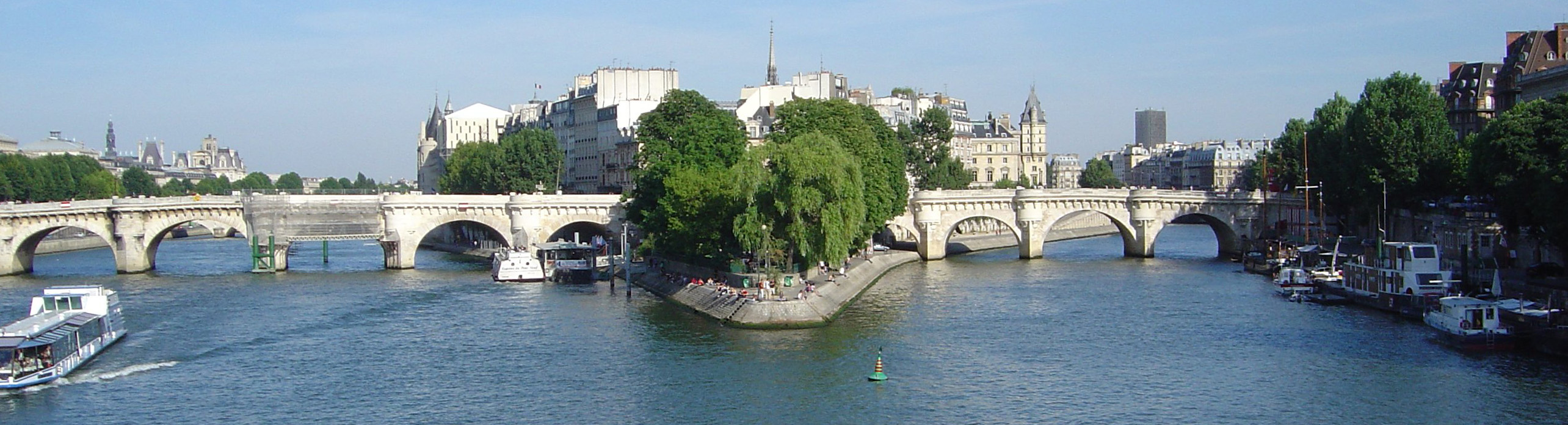
The Pont Neuf and Square du Vert-Galant seen from the west, downstream

=== Bridges ===
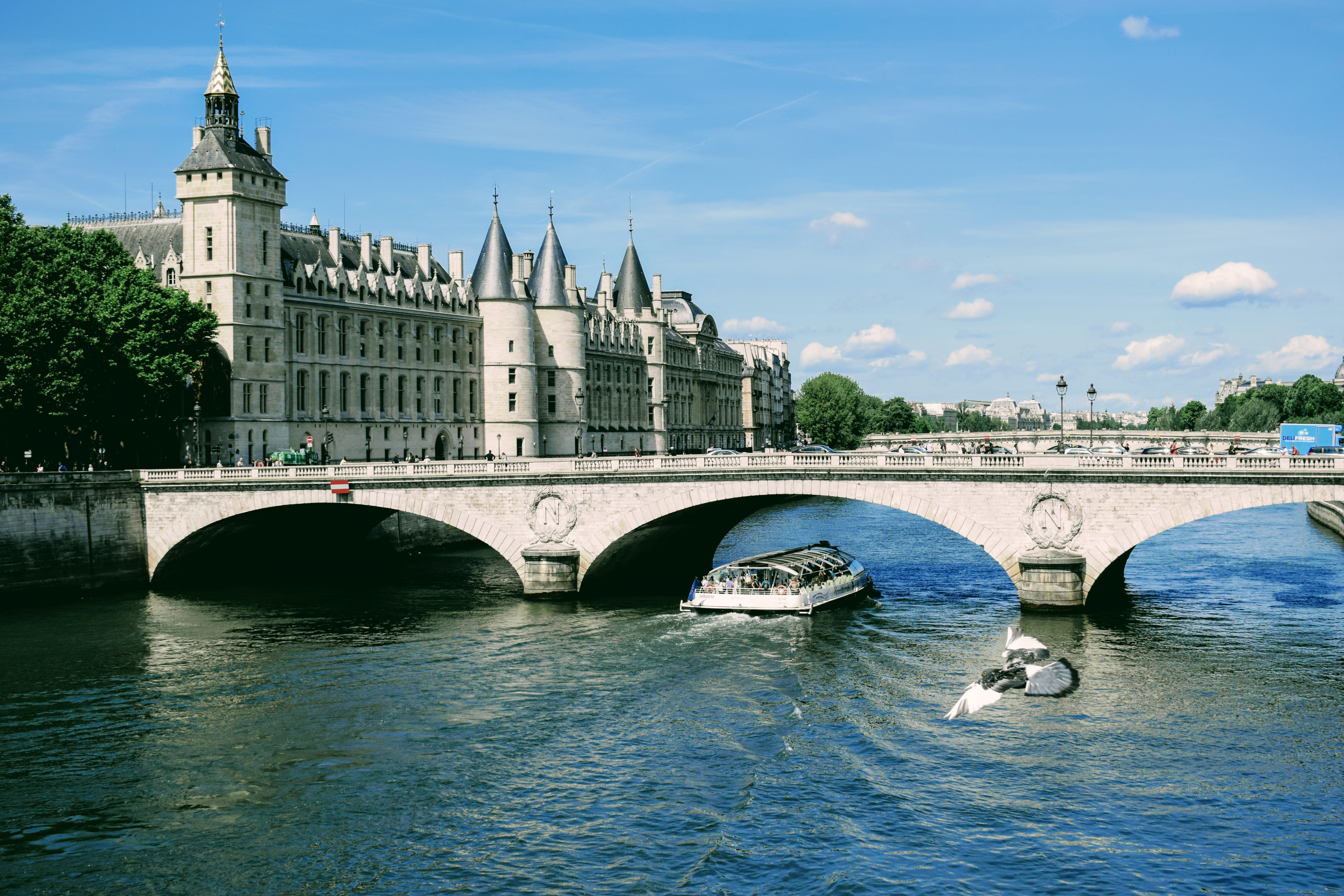
Pont au Change

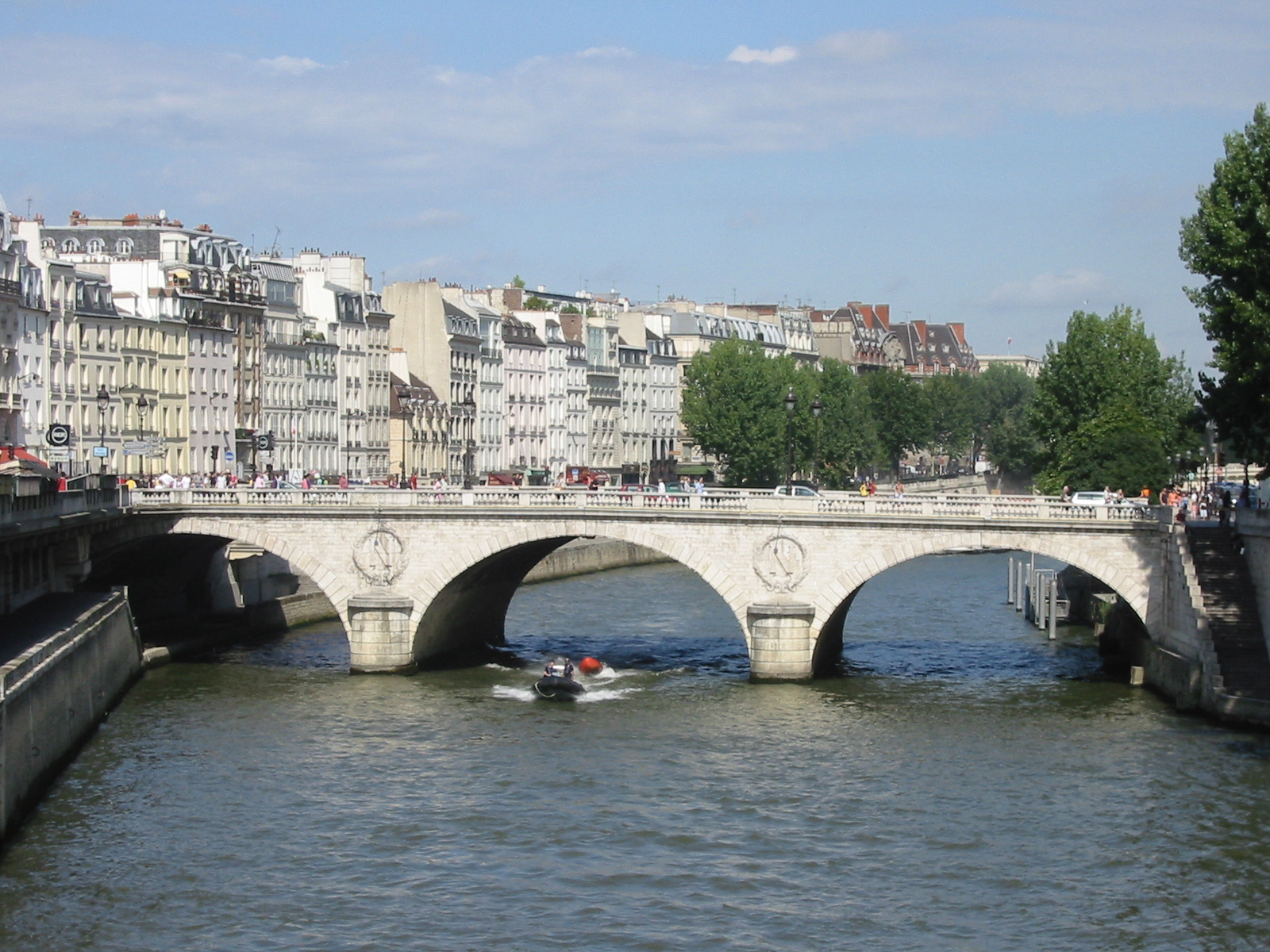
Pont Saint-Michel

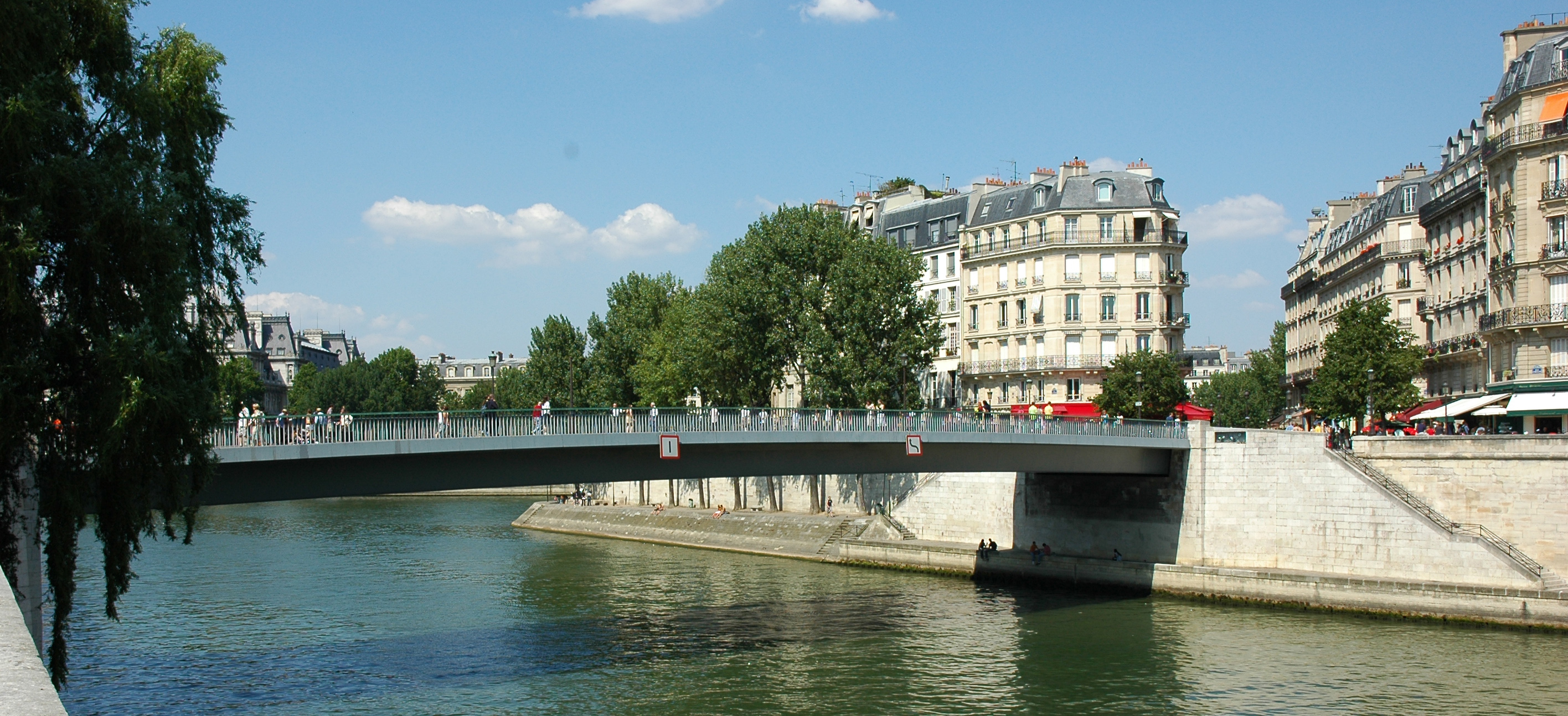
Pont Saint-Louis

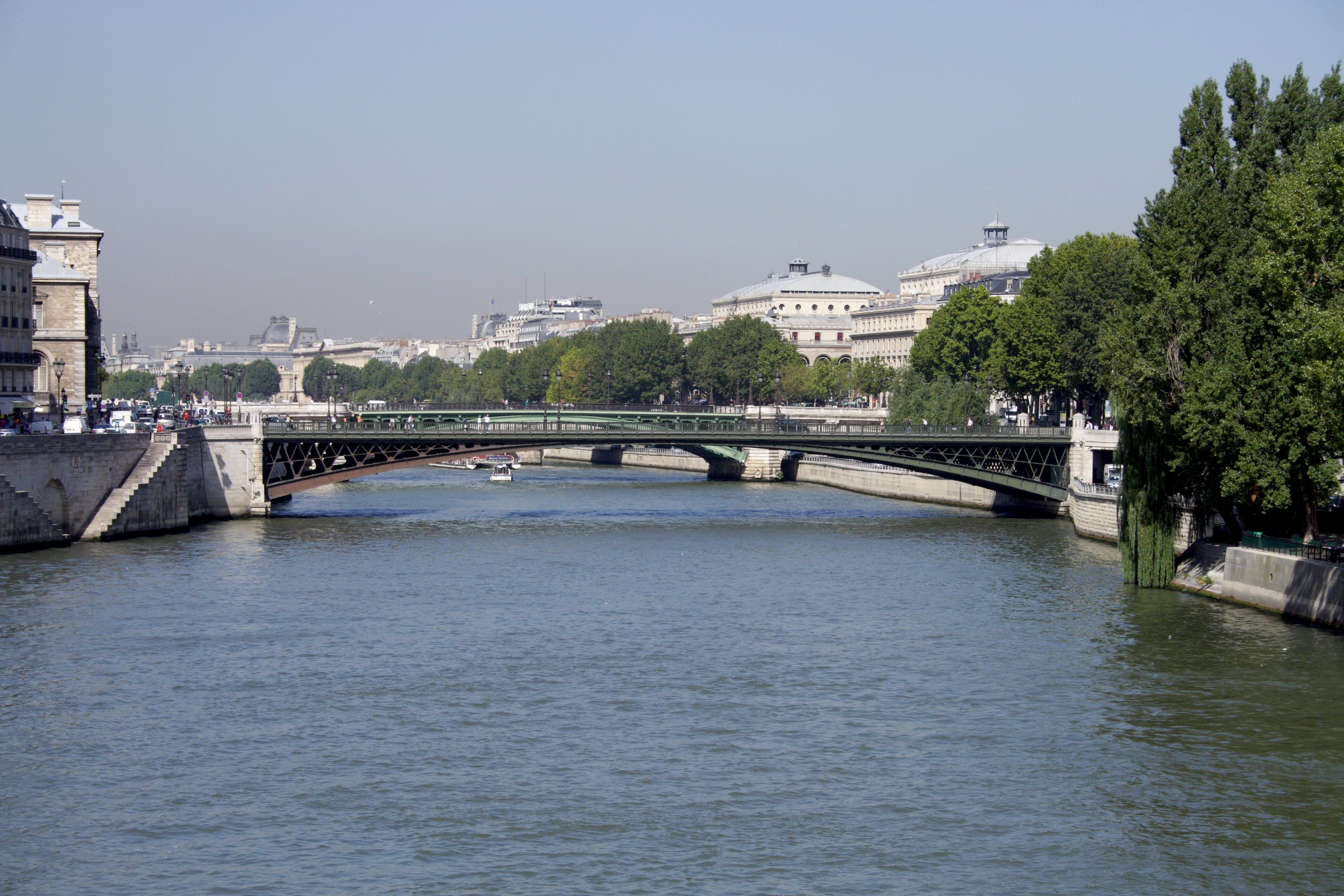
Pont d'Arcole

From early times wooden bridges linked the island to the riverbanks on either side. The Grand Pont (or Pont au Change) spanned the wider reach to the Right Bank, while the Petit Pont crossed the narrower channel to the Left Bank. The first stone bridge was built in 1378 at the site of the present Pont Saint-Michel; but ice floes carried it away, along with all the houses on it, 1408. (Note: Floods destroyed the bridge at intervals, the last houses being removed in 1809, and the present bridge was constructed in 1857. (Photos et historique: Le pont Saint-Michel).) The Grand Pont or Pont Notre-Dame - also swept away at intervals by floodwaters - and the Petit Pont were rebuilt by Fra Giovanni Giocondo at the beginning of the 16th century. The six arches of the Pont Notre-Dame supported gabled houses, some of half-timbered construction, until all were demolished in 1786. (Note: The present bridge dates from 1853, with the central arches replaced by an iron span in 1967. (Photos et historique: Le pont Notre Dame).)

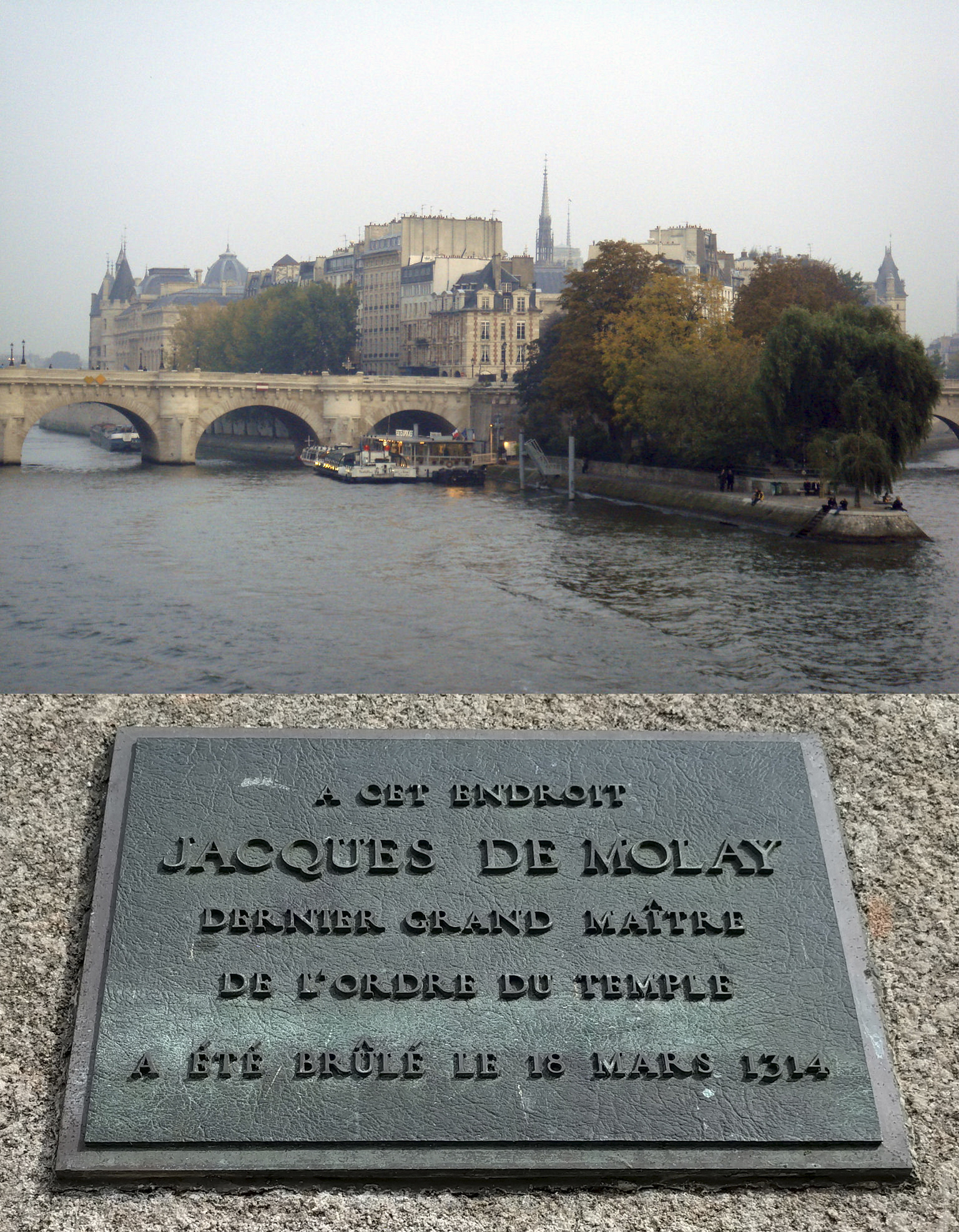
Plaque commemorating the burning of Jacques de Molay

Currently eight bridges connect the island with the rest of Paris.

- The Pont Neuf, begun by Henry IV and completed in 1607, is the oldest still in its original form, and the only one that goes from the right bank to the left bank
- The Pont au Change, from the Place du Châtelet on the right bank to the Quai de l'Horloge and the Palais de Justice
- The Pont Notre-Dame, across the centre of the island
- The Pont d'Arcole, from the Hôtel de Ville to the Hôtel-Dieu and Notre-Dame de Paris
- The Pont Saint-Louis, from Notre-Dame de Paris to Île Saint-Louis
- The Pont de l'Archevêché, from the southeast end of the island to the Quai de Montebello on the Left Bank
- The Pont au Double, from the Quai de Montebello on Left Bank to the front of Notre-Dame de Paris
- The Pont Saint-Michel, from Place Saint-Michel across the centre of the island to Châtelet

== Transport ==
The island has one Paris Métro station: Cité. There is also one RER station: Saint-Michel-Notre-Dame, although on the Left Bank, has an exit on the island in front of the cathedral.

== Bibliography ==
- Ballon, Hilary (1991). The Paris of Henri IV: Architecture and Urbanism. Cambridge, Massachusetts: The MIT Press. ISBN 9780262023092.
- Busson, Didier (2001). Paris ville antique (in French). Monum- Éditions du Patrimoine. ISBN 978-2-85822-368-8.
- Fierro, Alfred (1996). Histoire et dictionnaire de Paris (in French). Robert Laffont. ISBN 2-221--07862-4.
- de Brunhoff, Jacques (1987). La place Dauphine et l'île de la Cité (in French). Lyon. ISBN 2904638997.
- de Finance, Laurence (2012). La Sainte-Chapelle- Palais de la Cité (in French). Éditions du Patrimoine, Centre des Monuments Nationaux. ISBN 978-2-7577-0246-8.
- Delon, Monique (2000). La Conciergerie - Palais de la Cité (in French). Editions du Patrimoine. ISBN 978-2-85822298-8.
- Hillairet, Jacques (2017). Connaissance du Vieux Paris (in French). Payot. ISBN 9782228919111.
- Jarrassé, Dominique (2007). Grammaire des jardins Parisiens. Parigramme. ISBN 978-2-84096-476-6.
- Lecompte, Francis (2013). Notre-Dame, Île de la Cité et Île Saint-Louis (in English and French). Massin. ISBN 978-2-7072-0835-4.
