= Île Louviers =

Former island in the Seine in Paris, France

Coordinates: 48°50′56″N 2°21′47″E

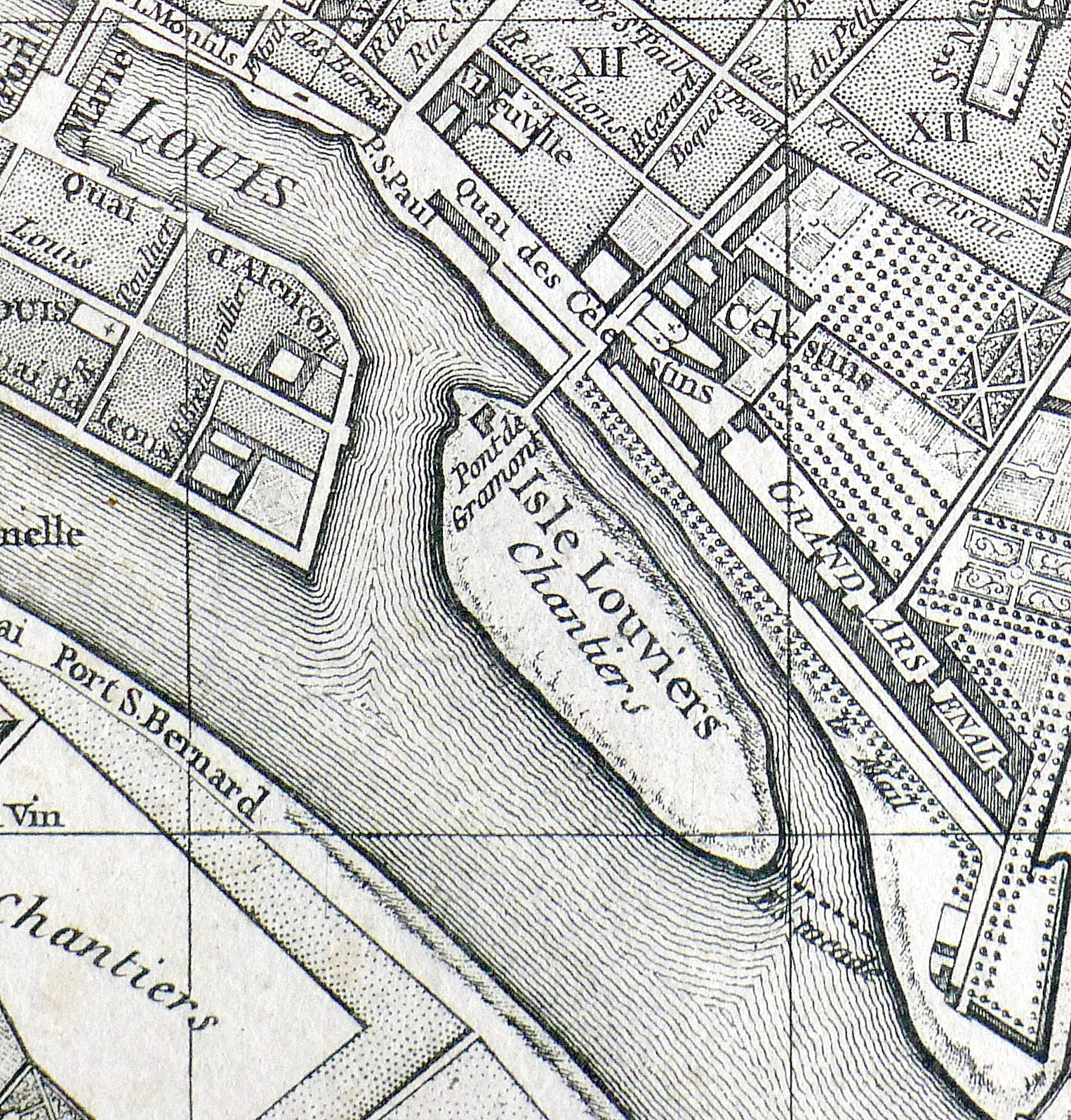
The Vaugondy map of Paris (1760) showing the Île Louviers

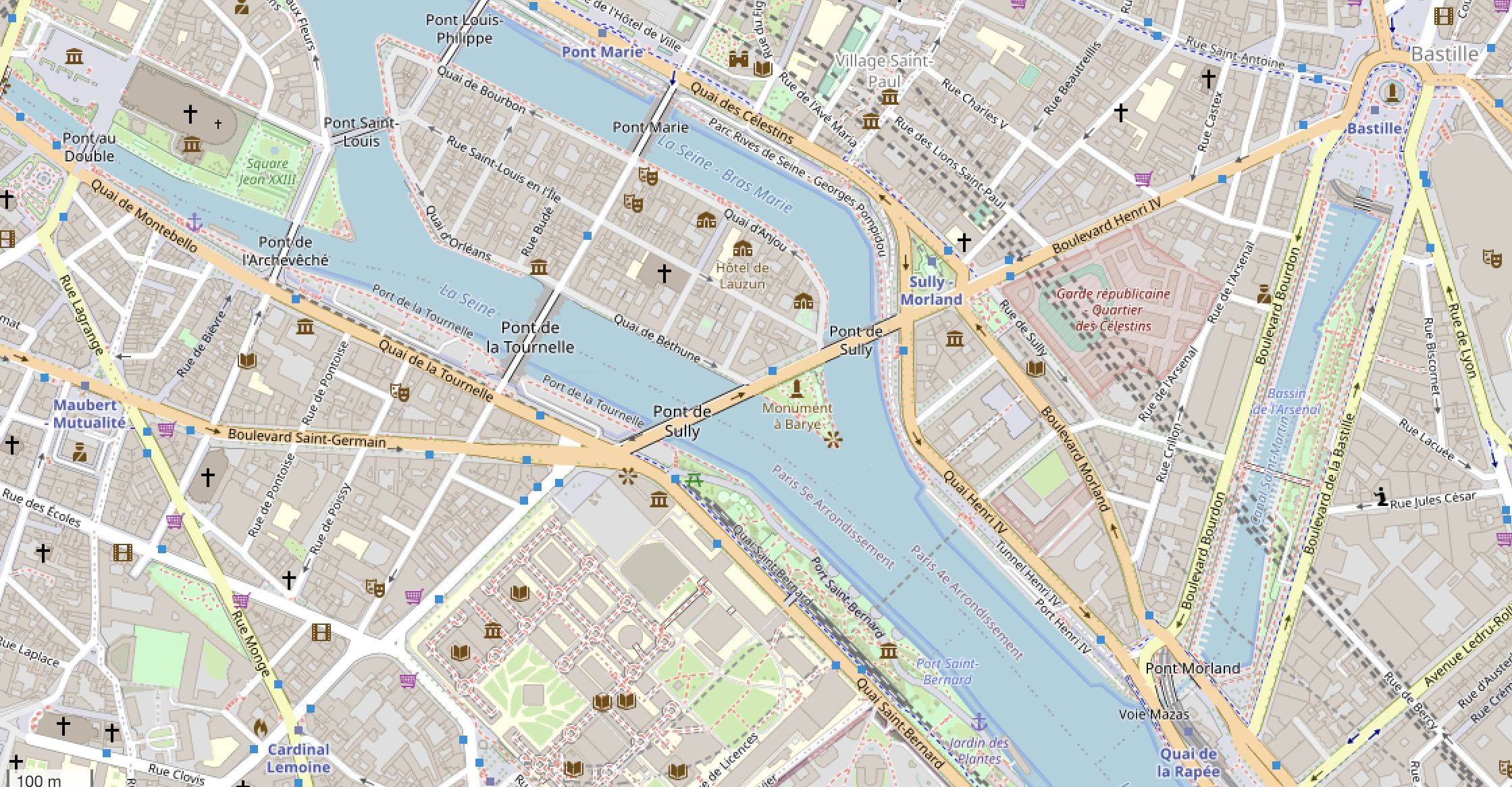
Central Paris today, showing position of the former Île Louviers

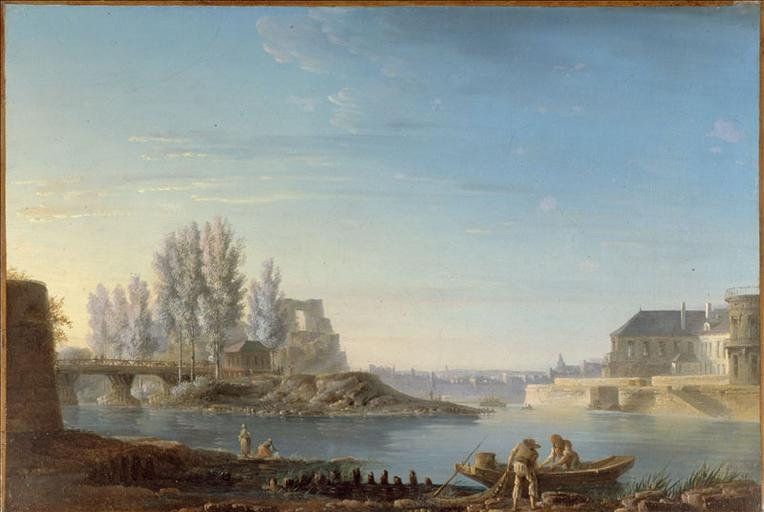
Painting (before 1780) by Alexandre-Jean Noël of the Île Louviers and the tip of île Saint-Louis

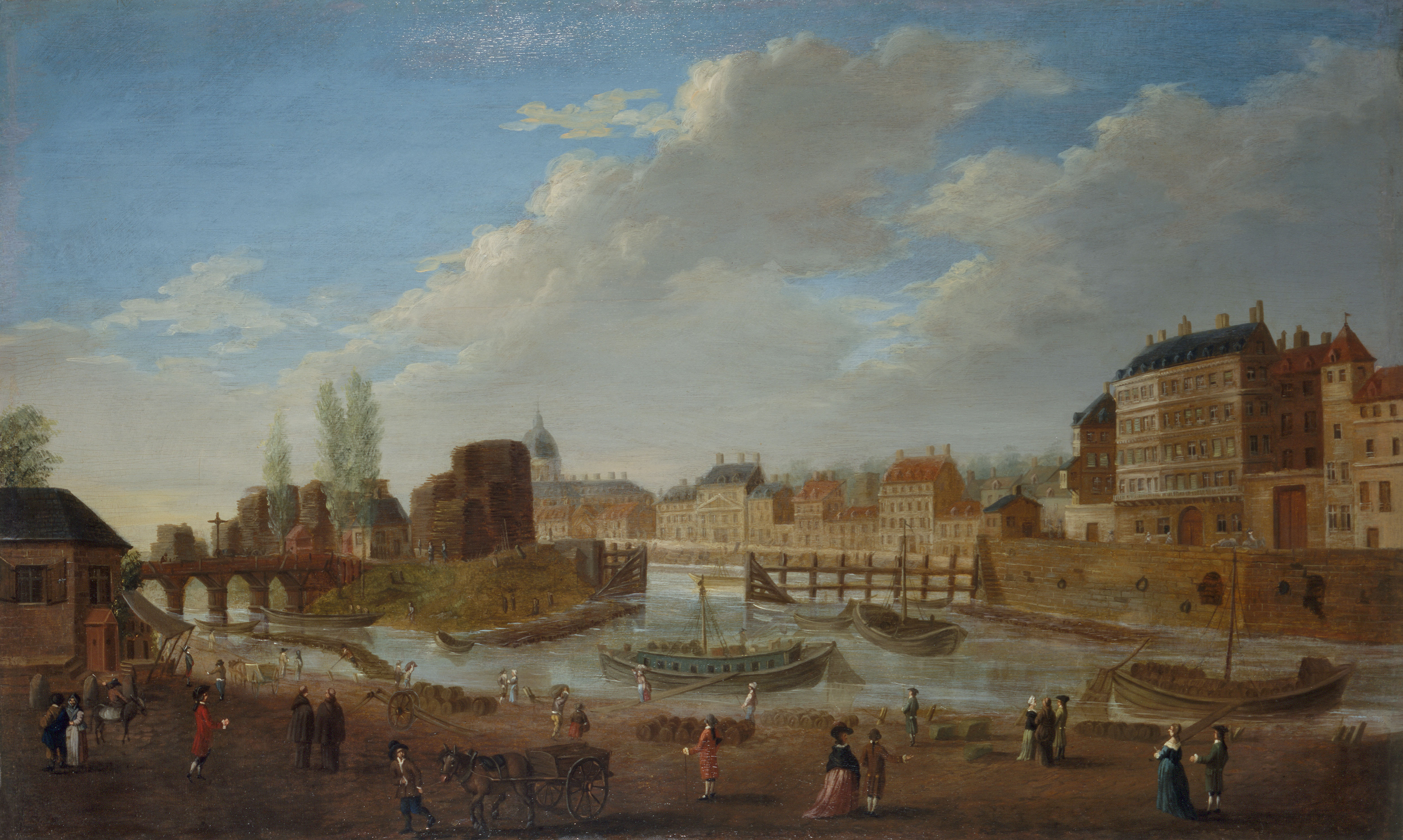
Painting (c.1780) by Pierre-Antoine Demachy, showing the stacks of wood on the Île Louviers, the Pont de Grammont (left) and a wooden groyne connecting it with the Île Saint-Louis (right)

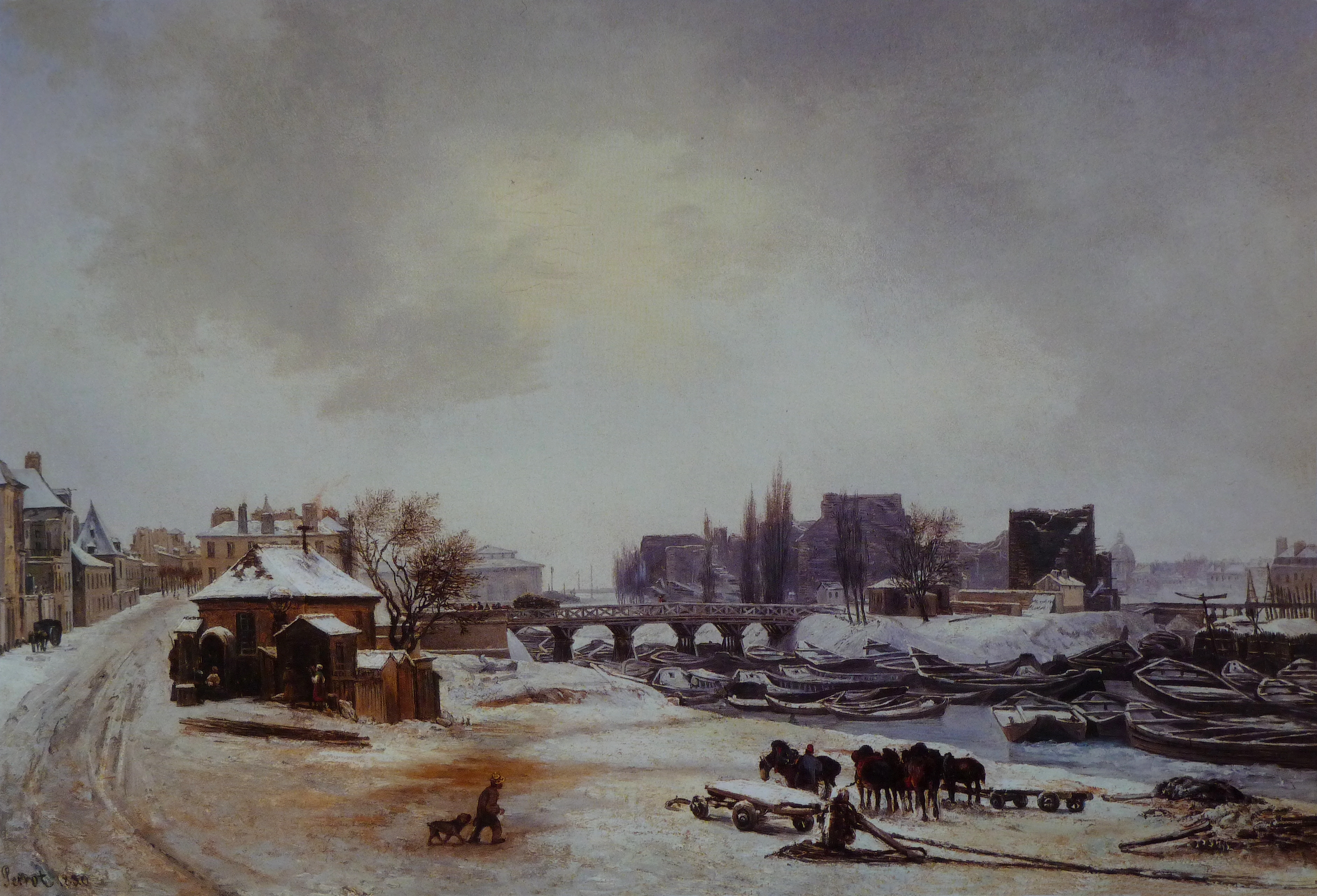
Painting (1830) by Antoine Perrot showing the stacks of wood on the Île Louviers, the Pont de Grammont (left) and a wooden groyne connecting it with the Île Saint-Louis (right)

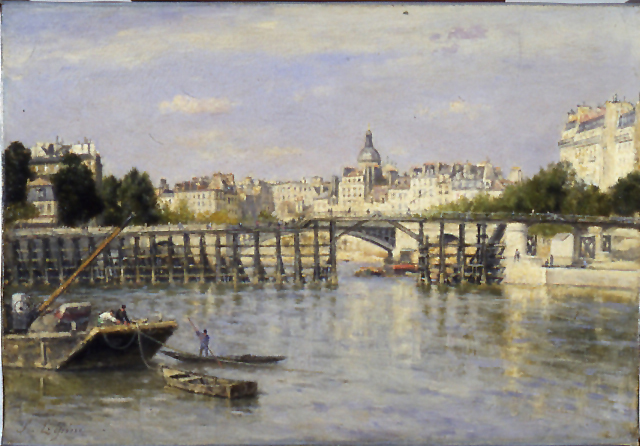
Stanislas Lépine (1890) The Estacade Bridge

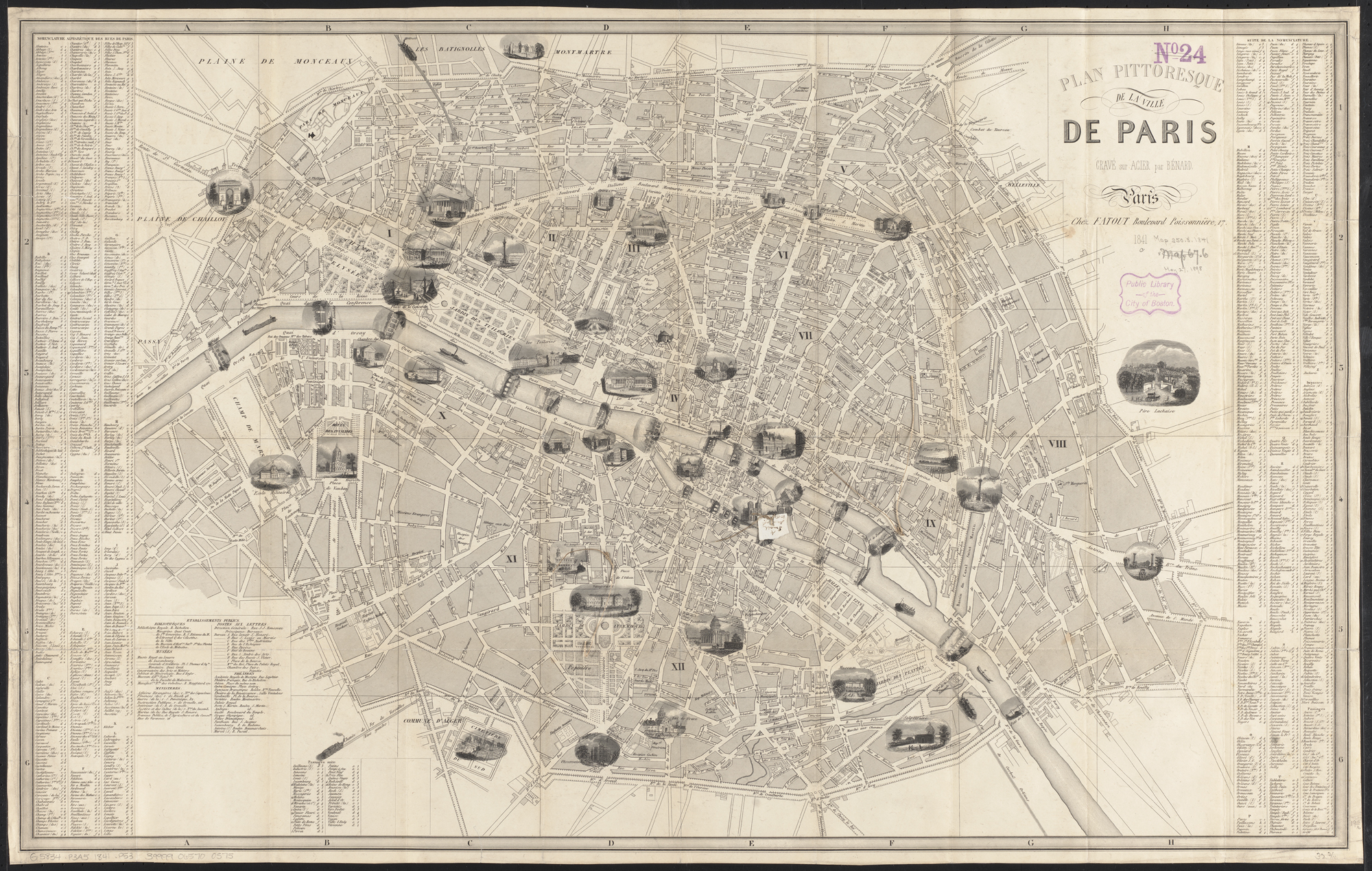
1841 map featuring the Passerelle de Damiette as a highlighted point of interest

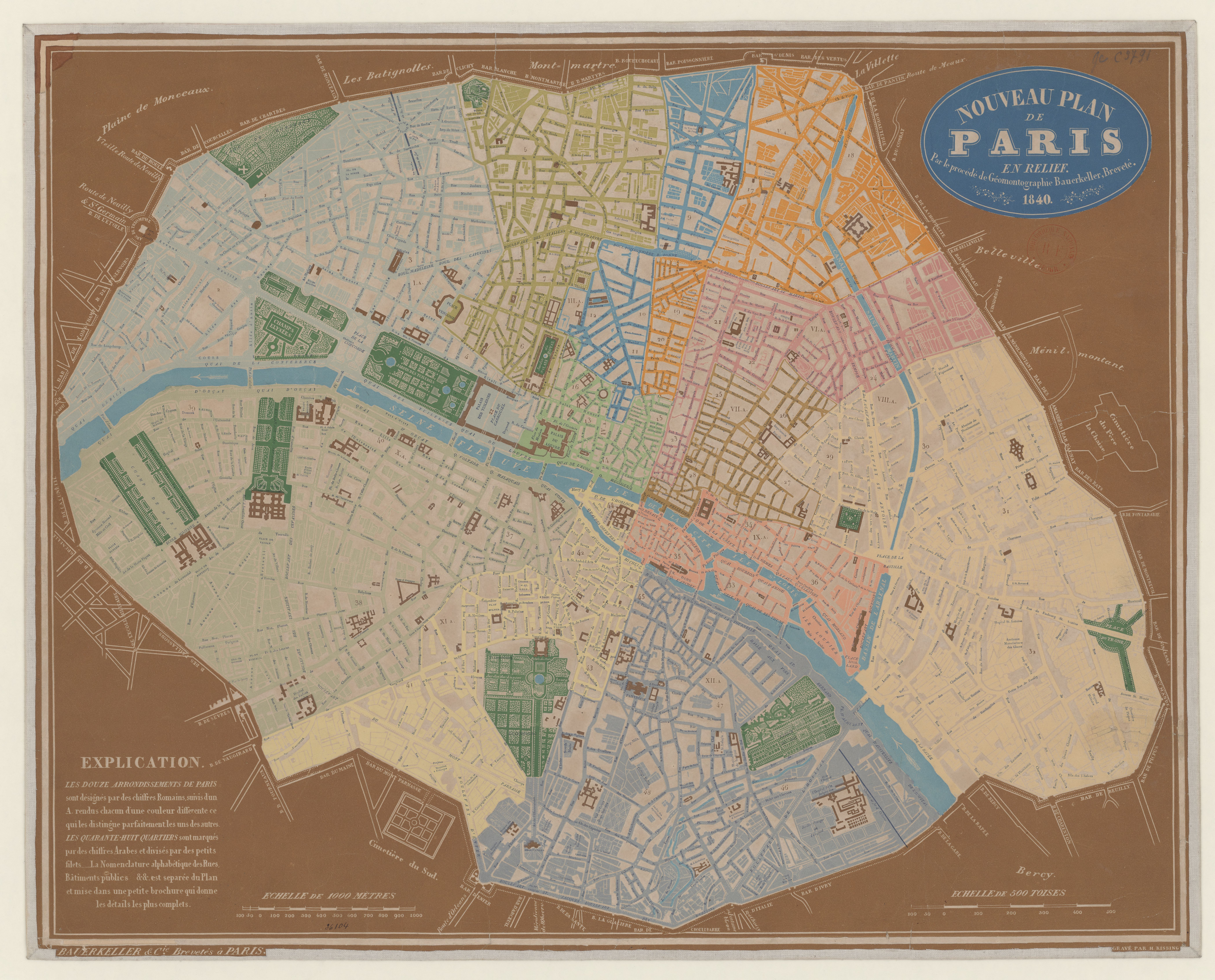
1840 map showing the Passerelle de Damiette and the Passerelle de l’Estacade

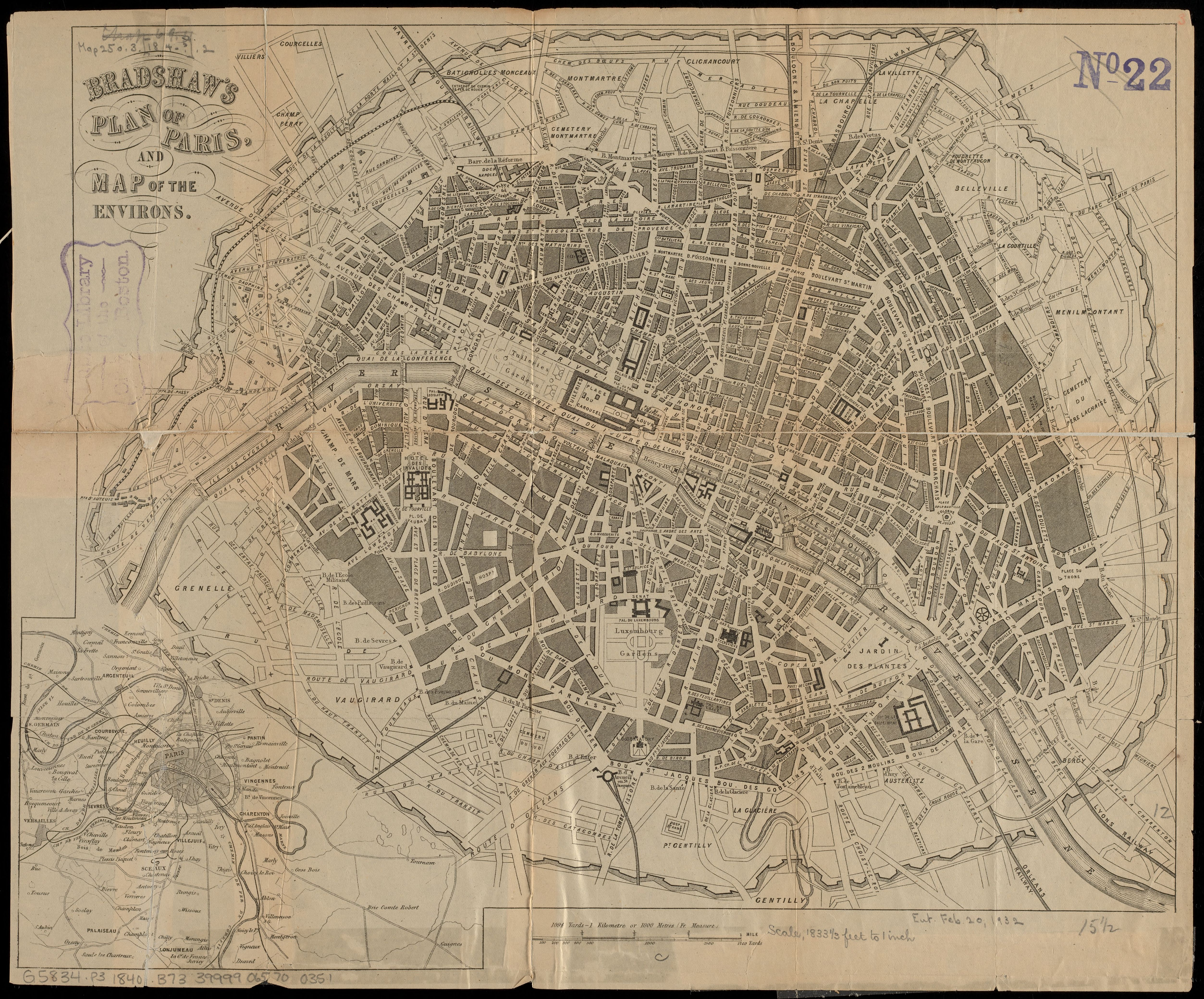
Bradshaw's plan of Paris, showing the Île Louviers connected to the north bank, the southern section of the Passarelle de Damiette still intact, and the Passerelle de l’Estacade

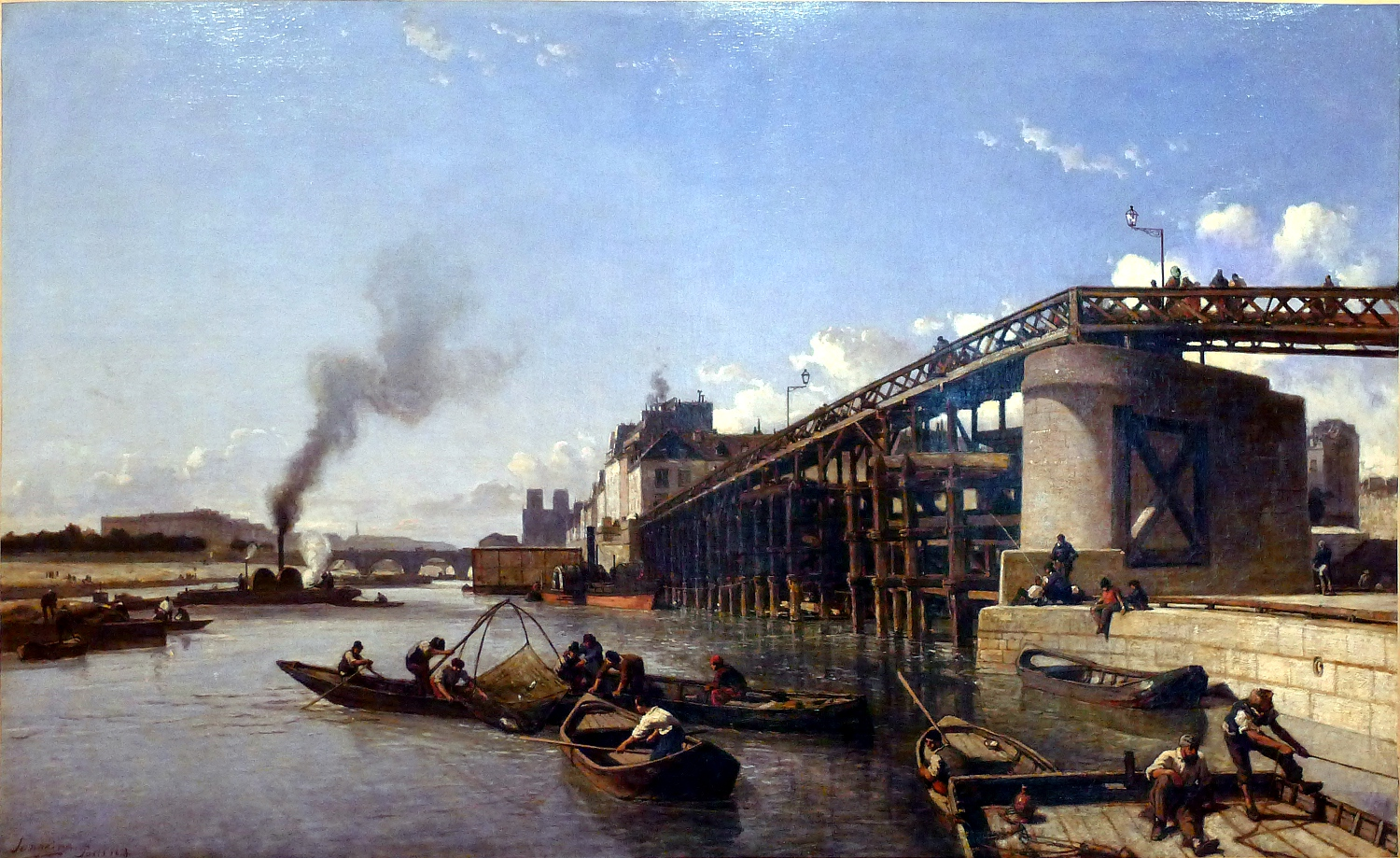
Vue de Paris, la Seine, l’Estacade (1853)

The Île Louviers is a former island in the Seine in the centre of Paris, just upstream of the present Île Saint-Louis and of a similar size. Never built up, it was connected with the north bank of the river in 1843. Just before it ceased to be an island it had a surface area of 33,638m². In modern Paris the former island lies between the quai Henri IV and the boulevard Morland.

== Names ==
The island had a number of different names in its history. Around 1370 it was called ‘Île aux Javiaux’ because it was made of sand and silt ("le javeau") carried by the Seine and the Bièvre. By 1446 it was known as ‘Île aux Meules des Javeaux’ (‘haystack island of Javeaux’), and after that simply as ‘Île aux Meules’ (‘haystack island’). In the fifteenth century, Île Louviers belonged to the fr:Prévôt des marchands de Paris, Nicolas de Louviers, from whom it later took its name. In the seventeenth century it was known as the Île d’Antrague, the name of its contemporary owner.

== Geography ==
Historically there were many more islands in Paris than the two that remain today, the Île de la Cité and the Île Saint-Louis. In medieval times there were ten low lying, sandy islands that were frequently flooded. The arm of the Seine that separated the Île Louviers from the north bank was known at various times as the bras du Mail, bras de l'Arsenal, bras Grammont and the bras Louviers. It was so shallow and so frequently filled with gravel that in summer it was often possible to walk across it.

== History ==
Originally the island was used for pasturage, but in 1549 the city of Paris erected a fort, a bridge and a marina, where a naval battle and the seizure of a fortress were enacted for the entertainment of Henri II and Catherine de Medici. In 1613, under Louis XIII, for the feast of Saint-Louis, a small castle filled with fireworks was erected on the island and set on fire. The twelve-year-old king and his mother were able to admire the display from their grandstand on the quai des Célestins.

In the seventeenth century the island took on a new commercial role in the city's economy. Louis XIV ordered the old city wall of Charles V to be demolished, removing the physical barrier between the city centre and the upstream areas. This led to the development of the Port Saint-Paul on the north bank, facing the Île Louviers. Boats laden heading downstream came with the current down the narrow arm of the Seine passing the island to reach the port. Those heading back upstream were hauled by horses along the banks of the Île Louviers.

In the seventeenth century the Paris authorities leased the island from the heirs of the sieur d’Antragues so that it could be used as a goods yard. The merchants who supplied the city were blocking up the quays with their goods and to remove the inconvenience and reduce smuggling, the city used the island for storage and built a pontoon bridge to connect it with the mainland. However the terms of the lease did not allow public access to the island, which made auctions difficult, so in 1671 Louis XIV’s council issued a decree ordering the island to be taken over outright by the city. However it was not eventually purchased until 1700, for 61,500 livres.

By 1714 the island was being used as storage for hay and fruit as well as carpenter’s timber. Later it was used mainly for storing firewood. In 1730 works were undertaken to widen the channel to the north of the island and reinforce its banks with piles. At the same time a wooden groyne (“estacade”) was built at the head of the channel to keep out floating ice in winter; a narrow entrance in the middle gave access to boats seeking shelter. In 1735 further work saw the surface of the island raised higher above the river, and further land was reclaimed, increasing its surface area. The following year more soil was brought onto the island, the boundaries of the lumber yards were restricted and the bridge was widened to make transit easier for pedestrians. From the early nineteenth century the city leased it to wood merchants for an annual rent of 40,000 francs.

On several occasions plans were conceived to fill in the channel separating the Île Louviers from the north bank, or to link it with neighbouring islands. In 1791 for example, an anonymous proposal was presented to the Commune of Paris that called for the Île Louviers to be united with the Île a Saint-Louis and Île de la Cité and then developed with docks and mills.

Eventually, in 1841, King Louis-Philippe ordered preparations to begin for filling in the Grammont arm of the Seine. The lease to the wood merchants was terminated and they were given two years to clear the island of their stock. By 1847 the branch of the river that separated it from the north bank had been filled in, connecting it with the former quai Morland. After the Revolution of 1848 the former island was used for some years as a military camp.

== Bridges ==
Several bridges and footbridges connected the Île Louviers to other parts of Paris. The main connection was the Pont de Grammont, a wooden construction erected in 1671 and rebuilt in 1823. It was 41m long and 10m wide, connecting the western tip of the island with the quai des Célestins. It was originally built by the Paris authorities after they leased the island for commercial use, and it was demolished in the 1840s as part of the project to connect the Île Louviers with the mainland.

In 1836 a contractor named de Beaumont obtained a concession to build two suspension footbridges over the Seine. The northern one was called the Passerelle de Damiette (named after Napoleon's victory) and it joined the western tip of the Île Louviers with the north bank near the Pont de Grammont before continuing across the next reach to the Île Saint Louis. A second footbridge, the Passerelle de Constantine, then connected the Île Saint Louis with the south bank. The northern part of the Passerelle de Damiette was 58m long and the connection with Île Saint-Louis was 76.6m long. The footbridges came into service in 1838 and pedestrians were required to pay a toll to use them. The northern section of the Passerelle de Damiette was removed as part of the construction work to join the Île Louviers to the mainland. The southern section was destroyed by rioters a few years later during the Revolution of 1848.

In the 1770s another wooden groyne (‘estacade’) was constructed at the upstream end of the reach separating the Île Louviers from the Île Saint-Louis, allowing it to be used as a dock and protecting it from winter ice. In 1843 a footbridge was added to this structure and it became known as the fr:Passerelle de l'Estacade. The footbridge remained after the île Louviers ceased to be an island, and was not demolished until 1932.

== Other former islands in Paris ==
- Île aux Juifs
- Île des Cygnes (not the modern Île aux Cygnes)
- Île à la Gourdaine
- fr:Île aux Vaches
- fr:Île Notre-Dame (Paris)
