= Françoise =

- Gender: feminine

Origin
- Meaning: Frenchwoman

Other names
- Related names: François, Frank

Françoise (French: [fʁɑ̃swaz]) is a French feminine given name (equivalent to the English Frances or Italian Francesca) and may refer to:

- Anne Françoise Elizabeth Lange (1772–1816), French actress
- Claudine Françoise Mignot (1624–1711), French adventuress
- Françoise Adnet (1924-2014), French figurative painter
- Françoise Ardré (1931-2010), French phycologist and marine scientist
- Françoise Arnoul (1931–2021), French actress
- Françoise Atlan (born 1964), Moroccan singer
- Françoise Balibar (born 1941), French physicist and science historian
- Françoise Ballet-Blu (born 1964), French politician
- Françoise Barré-Sinoussi (born 1947), virologist and Nobel Prize winner
- Françoise Basseporte (1701–1780), French painter
- Françoise Bertaut de Motteville (c. 1621–1689), French memoir writer
- Françoise Beaucournu-Saguez (1936–2000), French entomologist
- Françoise Bertin (1925-2014), French actress
- Françoise Boivin (born 1960), Canadian politician
- Françoise Bonnet (born 1957), French long-distance runner
- Françoise Bourdin (1952–2022), French novelist
- Françoise Briand (born 1951), French politician
- Francoise Brun-Cottan (born 1944), French-American voice actor
- Françoise Castex (born 1956), French politician
- Françoise Chandernagor (born 1945), French writer
- Françoise Claustre (1937–2006), French archaeologist
- Françoise d'Amboise (1427–1485), Carmelite nun
- Françoise d'Aubigné, marquise de Maintenon (1635–1719), morganatic second wife of Louis XIV of France
- Françoise d'Eaubonne (1920–2005), French feminist
- Françoise Gandriau (1775–1794), French teenager executed by guillotine
- Françoise de Graffigny (1695–1758), French writer
- Françoise David (born 1948), Knight of the National Order of Quebec
- Françoise de Cezelli (1558–1615), French chevalier and war hero
- Françoise de Foix (c. 1495–1537), mistress of Francis I of France
- Françoise Dior (1932–1993), French neo-Nazi
- Françoise Dolto (1908–1988), French doctor and psychoanalyst
- Françoise Dorin (1928–2018), French actor, comedian, novelist, playwright and songwriter
- Françoise Dorléac (1942–1967), popular French actress
- Françoise Dubois (born 1947), French politician
- Françoise Ducros, Canadian civil servant
- Françoise Dunand (born 1934), French Egyptologist and archaeologist
- Françoise Dupuy (1925–2022), French dancer and choreographer
- Françoise Dürr (born 1942), former tennis player
- Françoise Faucher (born 1929), French film actress
- Françoise Foning (1949–2015), Cameroonian businessperson and politician
- Françoise Forton (1957–2022), Brazilian actress
- Françoise Gilot (1921–2023), French born painter
- Françoise Giroud (1916–2003), French journalist, screenwriter, writer and politician
- Françoise Grossetête (born 1946), French politician
- Françoise Hardy (1944–2024), French singer
- Françoise Héritier (1933-2017), French anthropologist
- Françoise Lebrun, French actress
- Françoise Marie de Bourbon (1677-1749), Duchess consort of Orléans, wife of Philippe II, Duke of Orléans, "Mademoiselle de Blois"
- Françoise Macchi (born 1951), French former alpine skier
- Françoise Mallet-Joris (1930-2016), Belgian writer
- Françoise Matraire (19th century), printer
- Françoise Mbango Etone (born 1976), track and field athlete
- Françoise Meltzer (born 1947), professor of religion
- Françoise Mouly (born 1955), Paris-born French artist and designer
- Françoise Prévost (dancer) (c. 1680–1741), French ballerina
- Françoise Puene, Cameroonian politician
- Françoise Robertson, actress
- Françoise Rosay (1891–1974), French actress
- Françoise Sagan (1935–2004), French playwright, novelist and screenwriter
- Françoise Thom (born 1951), French historian and Sovietologist
- Françoise Yip (born 1972), Canadian actress
- Ghislaine Marie Françoise Dommanget (1900–1991), French actress
- Jeanne Françoise Julie Adélaïde Récamier (1777–1849), French socialite
- Louise Françoise Contat (1760–1813), French actress
- Marie Françoise Sophie Gay (1776–1852), French author

== See also ==
- Françoise Lake, a waterbody crossed by Opawica River in Québec, Canada
- Françoise River, a tributary of the rivière aux Anglais in Rivière-aux-Outardes, Quebec, Canada
- Françoise-Athénaïs
- Marie-Françoise
- Sainte-Françoise, Quebec (disambiguation)
- François
