= Marie-Françoise =

Marie-Françoise or Marie Françoise is a given name. Notable people with the name include:

- Ghislaine Marie Françoise Dommanget (1900–1991), French actress
- Marie Françoise Sophie Gay (1776–1852), French author
- Marie-Françoise André, French geographer
- Marie-Françoise Audollent (1943–2008), French actress
- Marie-Françoise Baslez (1946–2022), French historian and academic
- Marie Françoise Catherine de Beauvau-Craon (1711–1786), French noblewoman
- Marie-Françoise Bechtel (born 1946), French politician
- Marie-Françoise Bougaran (1850–1875), French serial killer
- Marie-Françoise Bucquet (1937–2018), French pianist
- Marie-Françoise Clergeau (born 1948), French politician
- Marie-Françoise Corot (1768–1851), French fashion designer
- Marie-Françoise Dubois (born 1948), French middle-distance runner
- Marie-Françoise Grange-Prigent (born 1961), French canoeist
- Marie-Françoise Guédon, Canadian anthropologist and professor of religious studies
- Marie-Françoise Hervieu (born 1972), Canadian fencer
- Marie-Françoise Leclère (1942–2021), French journalist
- Marie-Françoise Lubeth (1962–2009), French athletics competitor
- Marie-Françoise Mégie (born 1950), Canadian physician
- Marie Françoise Ouedraogo (born 1967), Burkinabé mathematician
- Marie-Françoise Peignon, French businessperson
- Marie-Françoise Pérol-Dumont (born 1952), the President of the General Council of the French department of Haute-Vienne
- Marie-Françoise Perroton (1796–1873), French nun
- Marie-Françoise Plissart, Belgian photographer and video artist
- Marie-Françoise Roy, French mathematician and academic
- Marie-Françoise de Saint-Aubin (1753–1822), French artist
- Marie Françoise Sidibe, French footballer
- Marie-Françoise Sprote (1746–1818), French artist

== See also ==
- Françoise
- Marie (given name)
