= Île à la Gourdaine =

Former eyot (islet) in the river Seine in Paris, France

Coordinates: 48°51′27″N 2°20′25″E

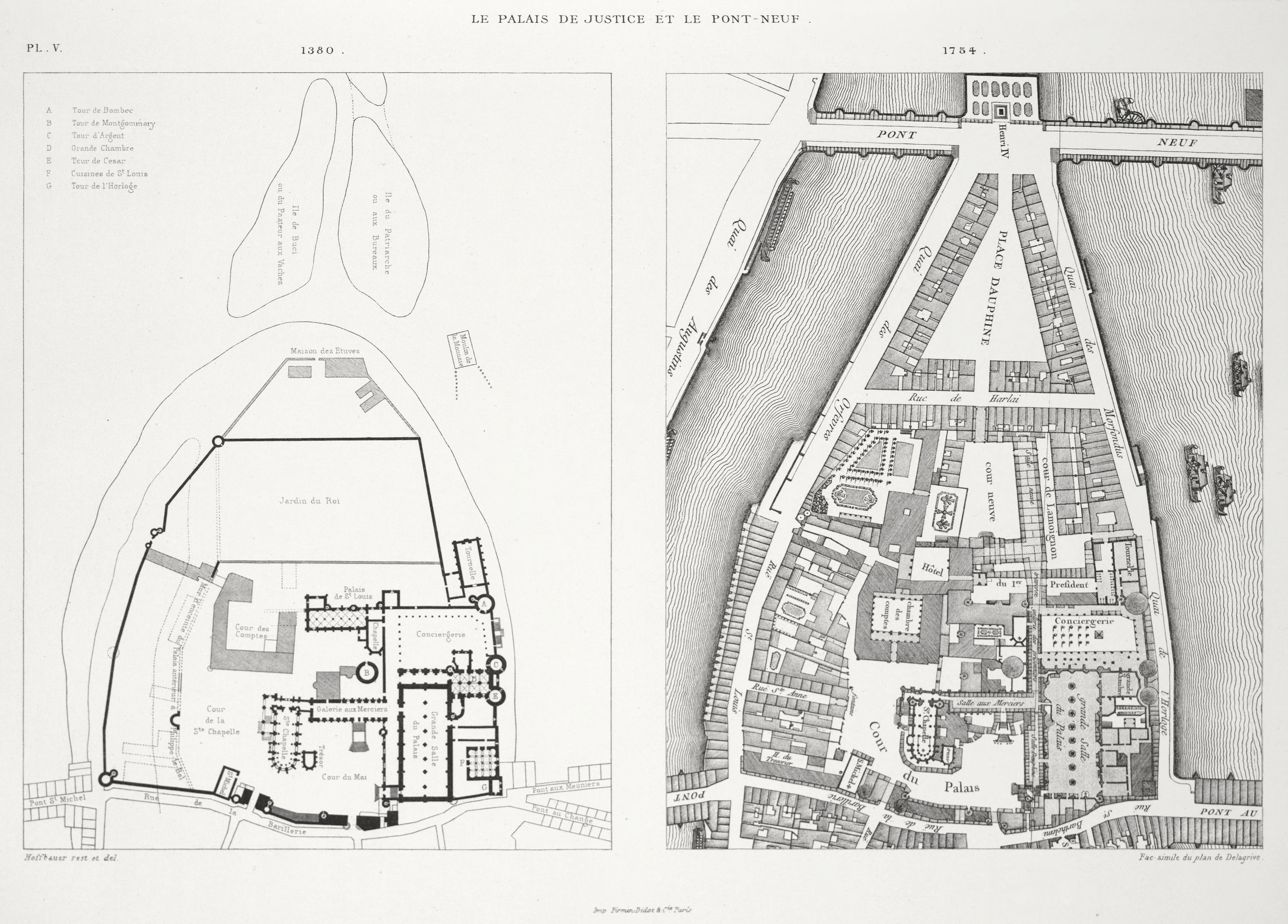
Left hand panel (1380) the Île à la Gourdaine shown as “Île du Patriarche ou aux Bureaux.” Right hand panel (1754) the islets subsumed under the place Dauphine

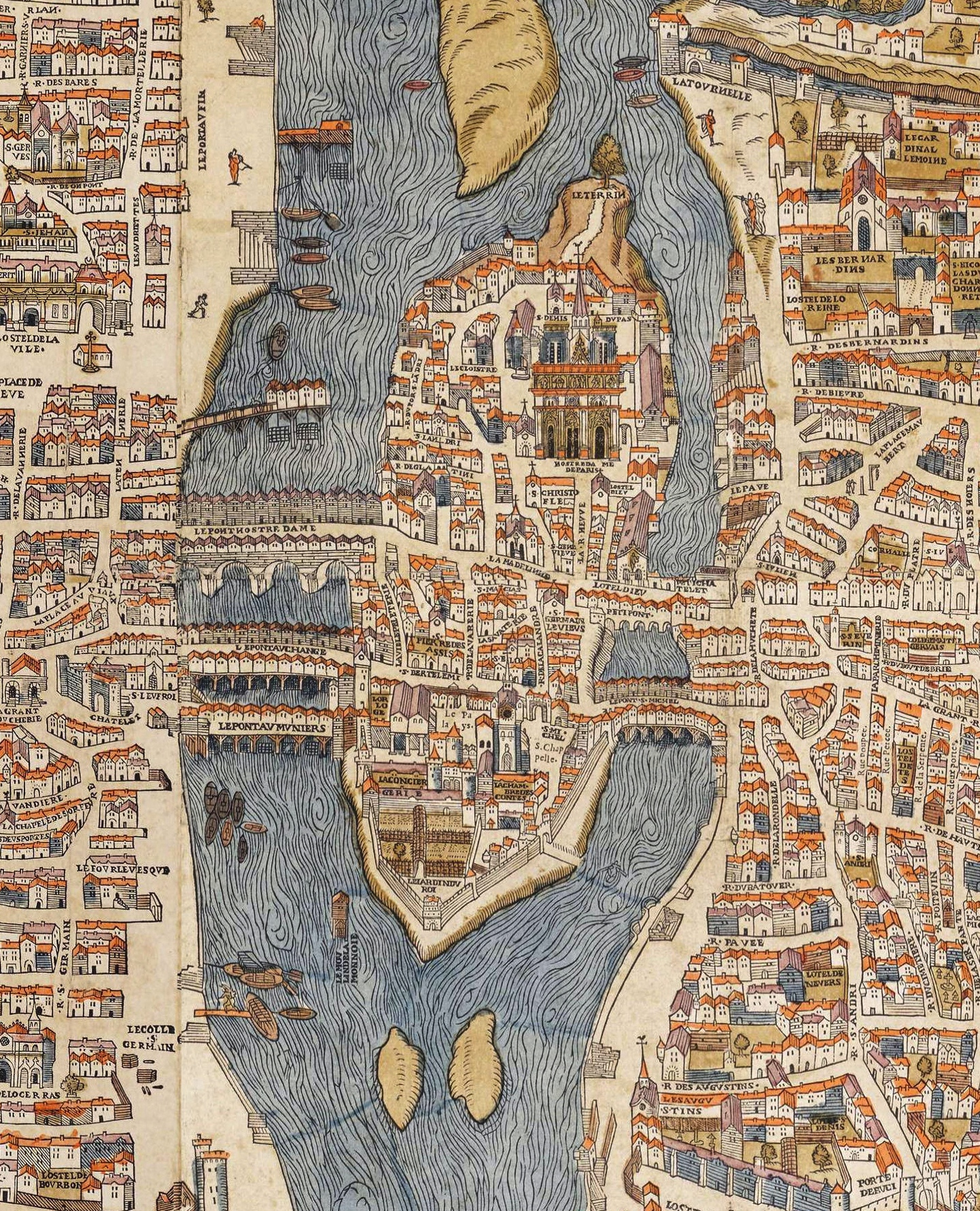
Map of Paris c.1560 showing the Île Gourdaine and the Île des Juifs (both unlabelled)

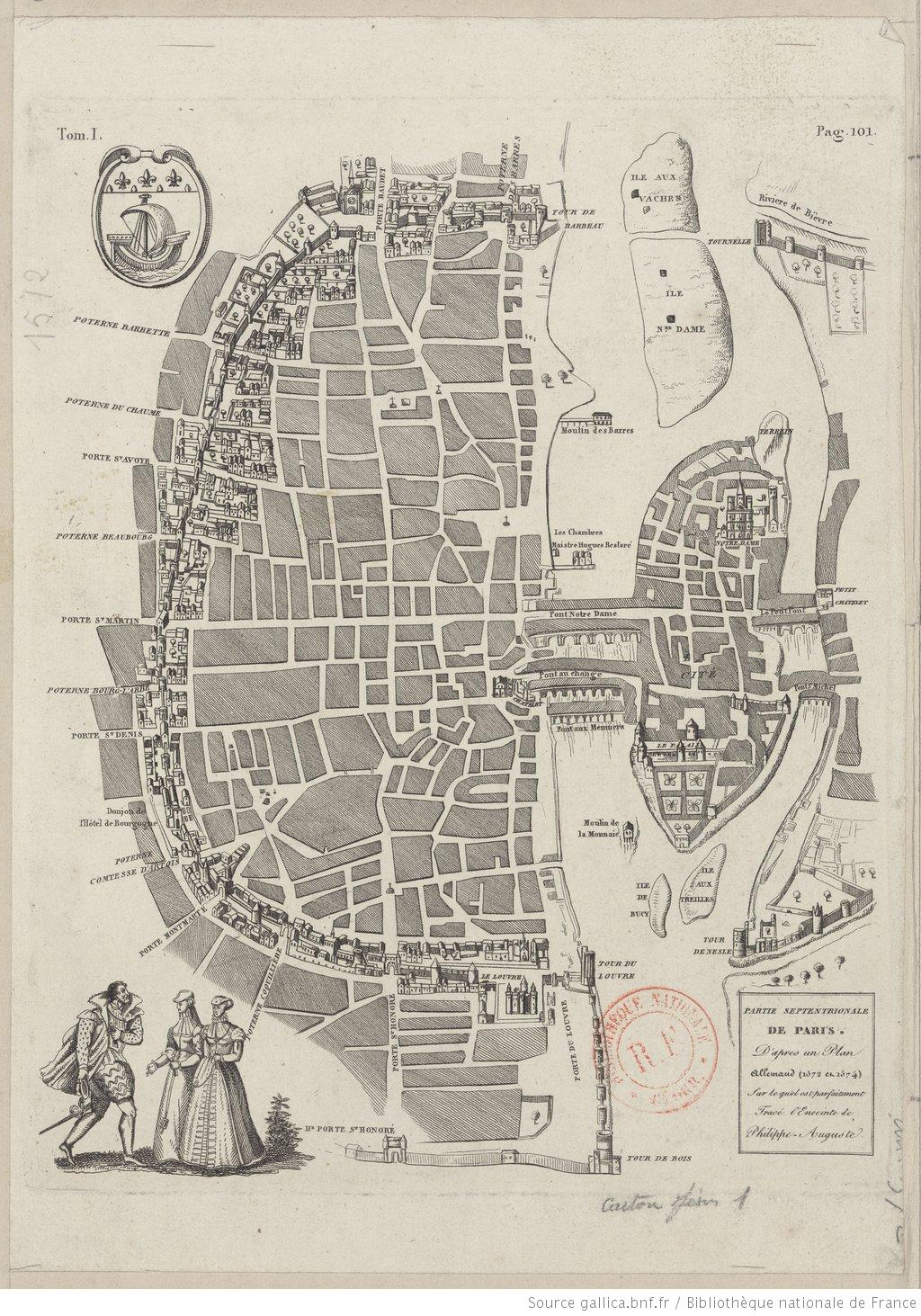
German map from the 1570s showing the “Île de Bucy” with the watermill nearby.

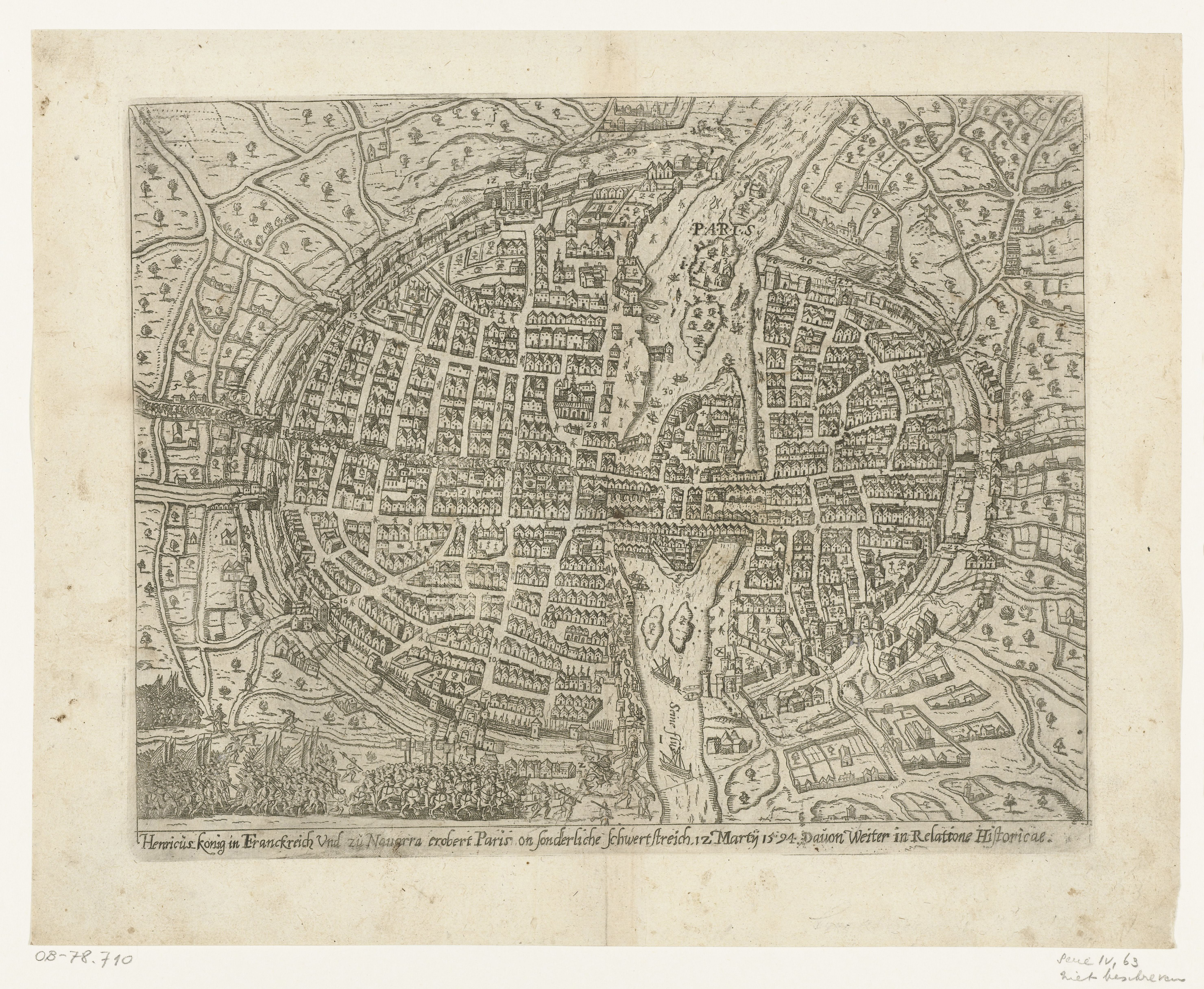
Paris in 1594

Île à la Gourdaine (or Îlot de la Gourdaine) is a former eyot (islet) in the river Seine in central Paris. It was built over in 1607 to create the current Place Dauphine.

== Location ==
The island lay immediately downstream (west) of the Île de la Cité and immediately north of the Île aux Juifs. Historically there were many more islands in Paris than the two that remain today, the Île de la Cité and the Île Saint-Louis. In medieval times there were ten low lying, sandy islands that were frequently flooded.

== Name ==
One suggested origin of the name ‘gourdaine’ is that the term means ferry or skiff, because of the ferries that were used to approach the island. Another suggested etymology is that the name means ‘difficult to approach’. A third explanation of the name is that “gourdain” was the name of the watermill which can be seen close by the island on early maps.

Some records suggest that the island was known as “île du-Pasteur-aux-vaches” (“cowherd island”), “île de Bucy”, (Note: Bucy was the name of a family who included fr: Simon de Buci, counsellor to Philip VI of France and first President of the Parlement of Paris. and Simon Matifas de Bucy, bishop of Paris (d.1304)) or “île au Moulin-Buci” (“Buci”s mill island”). However Jaillot maintained that these names referred to a different island entirely. Indeed different historians maintained that their predecessors had confused the names of the various islands, so that which name belonged to which island at which time is far from clear.

It is possible that the island was also known as “Île du Patriarche” because, supposedly, Jacques de Molay was executed there in 1314. Most sources however locate the place of de Molay’s execution as the Île aux Juifs, the island immediately to the south of the Île à la Gourdaine.

== History ==
The islands in the Seine were used as pasturage for animals, and they were covered in grass, reeds and willow trees. They belonged to the abbey of Saint-Germain-des-Prés. On 28 April 1471 the rights to income from the island were assigned to the parish of Saint-Sulpice, Paris.

Some historians locate a watermill on the island though it appears on maps as a separate structure. The island may have taken its name from the mill, or the mill from the island. The income from this mill was used for the maintenance of the building of Saint-Eustache. The mill was transferred to the use of the Monnaie de Paris either by Henry II or by Francis II under fr:Guillaume de Marillac after his associate Aubin Olivier devised a method of using a mill to strike coins.

In the medieval period the island was a haunt of night-time prostitutes who plied their trade beneath the willow trees. Paul Lacroix suggested that the name of the island derived from the term “goudine”, “gourgandine” or “gordane”, meaning “prostitute.”

== Building the Pont Neuf ==
When work began on building the Pont Neuf in 1578, the watermill (“moulin de la Monnaie”) was demolished and two quays were built out from the Île de la Cité onto the Île à la Gourdaine and its neighbouring islets. Building work on the quays started in 1580 and after interruptions caused by political unrest, it was not completed until 1611.

In 1607 king Henry IV granted the area within the new quays to fr: Achille de Harlay, giving him responsibility for developing it according to a masterplan that provided for streets and houses. The Place du Dauphin and the streets west of the Rue de Harlay were part of this development.

A plinth was built on part of the Île à la Gourdine, and an equestrian statue of Henry IV was mounted on top of it. The western extremity of the island was incorporated into an extended spit of low-lying land that was originally built on but later became the Square du Vert-Galant.
