= Marie-Françoise Sprote =

French artist (1746–1818)

Marie-Françoise Sprote, later Marie Leschevin de Précourt, (18 May 1746 – 10 December 1818) was a French painter.

Born in Paris, Sprote was the granddaughter of Dominique Sprote, a tailor who rose to become a conseiller du roi, merchant and jeweler. Her father, Louis-Dominique Sprote, served as a conseiller de l’élection de Paris beginning in 1775. He lived in the rue Saint-Honoré, where his daughter was born.

She exhibited pastels and miniature paintings at the place Dauphine in 1767. More miniatures are mentioned again in a newspaper notice of the following year; this appears to have marked the end of her artistic career.

In 1768, in Versailles, Sprote married Augustin Leschevin de Précourt, who held various royal offices throughout his career, and who was awarded a pension of 2400 livres in 1788 by Louis XVI; his wife received a pension of 600 livres at the same time.

The couple had three sons, the eldest and only surviving of whom, Philippe-Xavier, would go on to become a chemist of note. He was imprisoned for five months during the French Revolution before his mother won his release. Her husband, meanwhile, was executed in 1793.

Sprote died in Paris.
