= Square du Vert-Galant =

Urban park in Paris, France

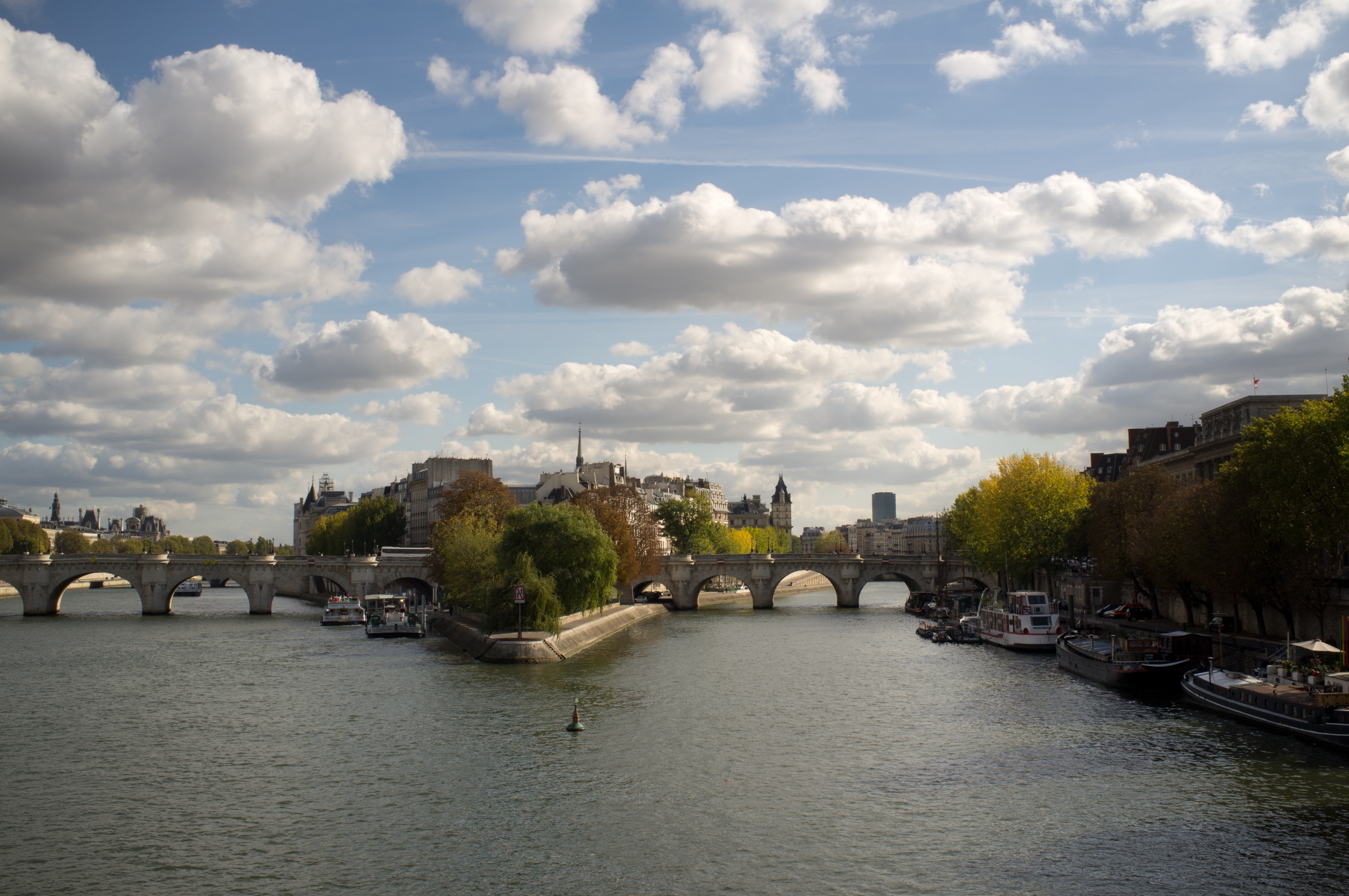
- View from Pont des Arts

- Location within Paris
- Type: Urban Park
- Location: 1st arrondissement, Paris
- Coordinates: 48°51′26″N 2°20′24″E
- Area: 1,642m^{2}
- Created: 1884

The Square du Vert-Galant is a small, triangular park pointing downstream located at the western tip of the Ile de la Cité, next to the Pont Neuf, in the First Arrondissement of Paris. It was created in 1884 by joining two small islands to the larger island.

== Name Origin ==
The Square du Vert-Galant earns its name from Henry IV of France, who was nicknamed Vert-Galant (Green Gallant) due to having numerous mistresses despite his advanced age at the time. Additionally, there is the large bronze Equestrian statue of Henry IV overlooking the square, now oxidized to a green hue.

== History ==
In 1585, the Pont Neuf began construction over the farthest west point of Île de la Cité, The Pont Neuf, completed in 1606, was the first bridge in Paris to cross the entire length of the Seine, and was the first that was not lined with houses. It was the project of Henry IV. In 1607, Henry IV gave up the royal garden on the island's west end to allow for the construction of the Place Dauphine to the east of the Pont Neuf, and the Square du Vert-Galant to its west. After his assassination, his statue was placed on the bridge. The original Equestrian statue of Henry IV was erected on west side of the Pont Neuf in 1618, and overlooked the Square du Vert-Galant and the future park. However, it was destroyed on August 11, 1792, during the French Revolution, with some surviving pieces relocated to the Louvre, where they can still be seen today. The current version, recast in 1818 by François-Frédéric Lemot after the Bourbon Restoration in France, and uses a copy of the original mold, although varies in a few details.

When the Pont Neuf, was completed the bridge was at the west end of the Ile de la Cité, overlooking the river. Two small islands originally lay just west of the bridge; the Île à la Gourdaine or Island of the Patriarch, and the Ile aux Juifs, which had been the site of the persecution and execution of Jews, and which in 1314 had been the execution site of Jacques de Molay, the head of the Knights Templar, as well as another Templar leader, Geoffroi de Charney. Both were burned at the stake for heresy. A plaque commemorating Molay's execution sits at the entrance to the square, which now occupies the land.

Before becoming a public square, the area of Square du Vert-Galant housed baths by about 1765, with a cafe with live music being built in 1865. However, due to the area's low lying level, this was destroyed by a flood in 1879, and the land was sold to the city of Paris in 1884 to be made a green space.. The square was painted by Pissarro in 1902.

In 2007, Square du Vert-Galant obtained the label 'Espace Vert Écologique' (Ecological Green Space).

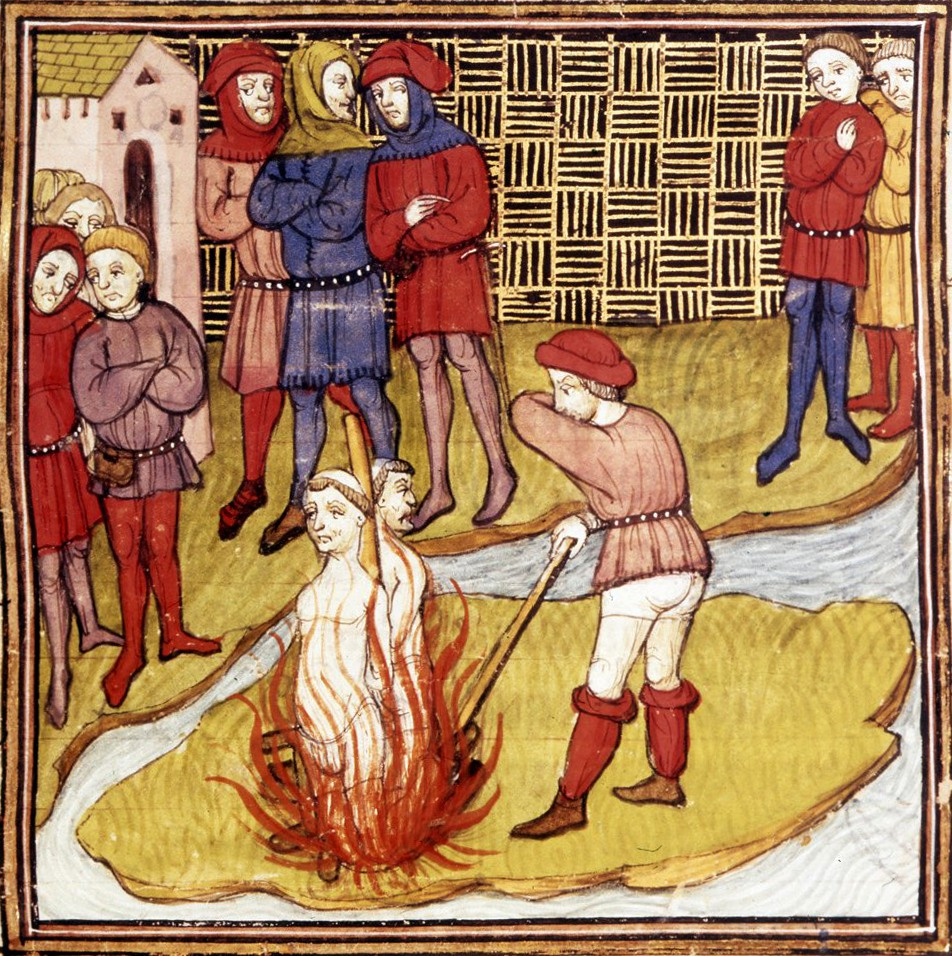
Execution of Jacques de Molay on the ile aux Juifs, March 18, 1314 (miniature du Maître de Virgile. Grandes Chroniques de France, vers 1380, BL, Royal MS 20 C vii, f.48r.

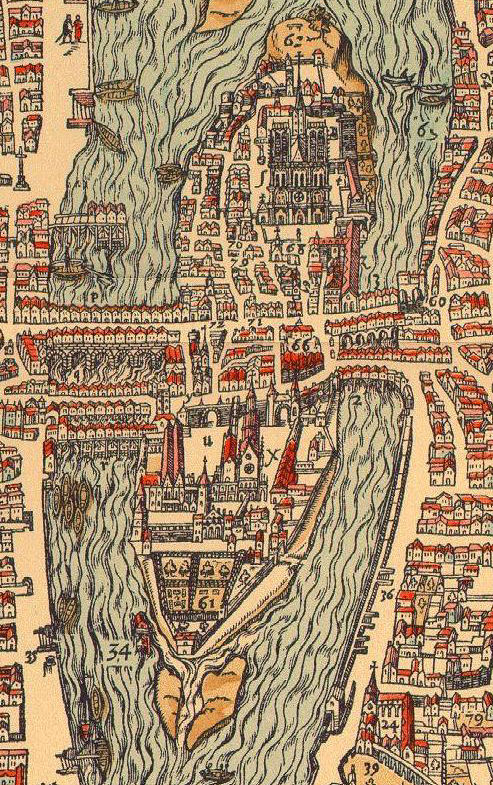
The two small islands in 1575, before they were joined together to form the square

== Description ==
The square has an area of 1,642 square meters, or just four-tenths of an acre. It is planted with chestnut trees, taxus or yew trees, prunus pissardii or plum trees; black walnut trees, érables negundo, flowering apple trees, Salix babylonica or weeping willows, Olive trees from Bohemia, Sophora trees, catalpa, robiniers, and Ginkgo biloba. When the Seine rises to an unusual height, as in January 2018, the park is submerged.

== Gallery ==
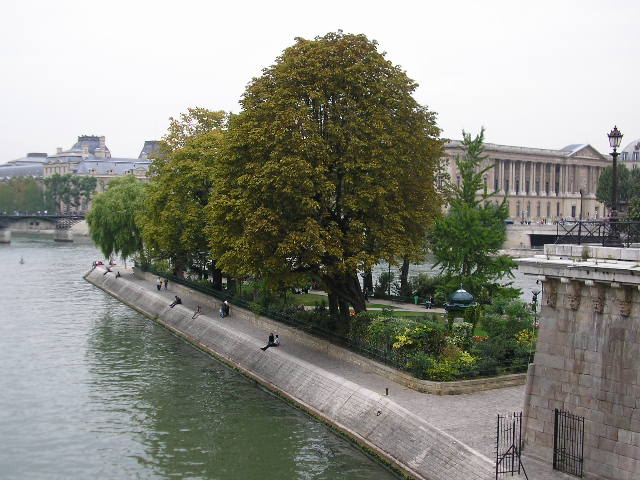
Square du Vert-Galant

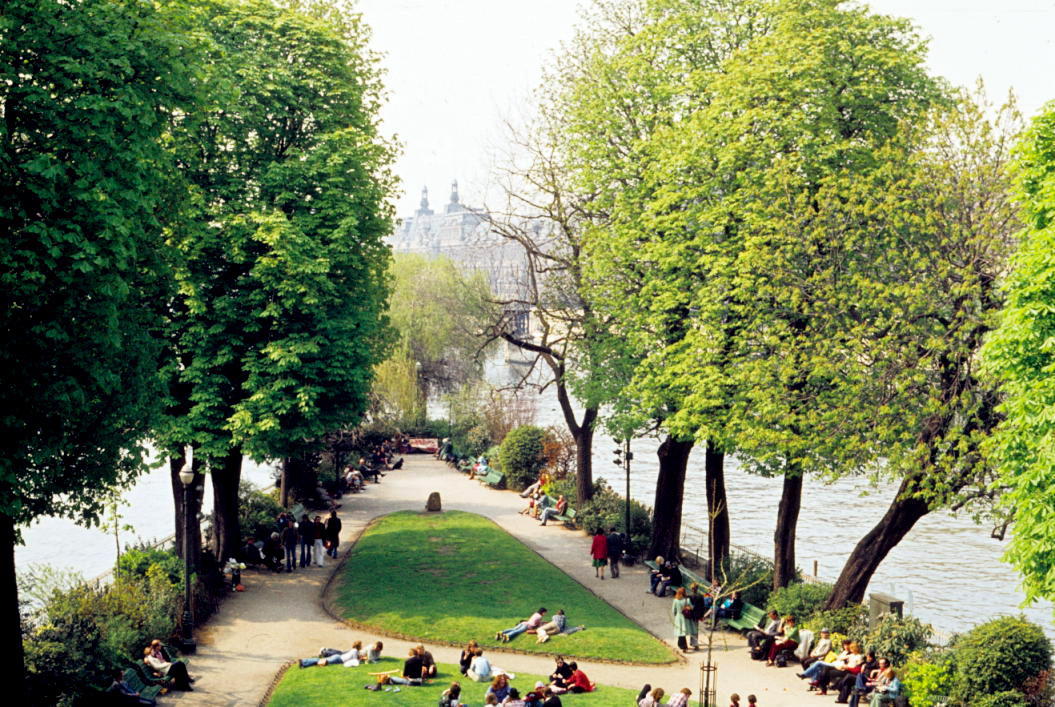
Park viewed from the Pont Neuf

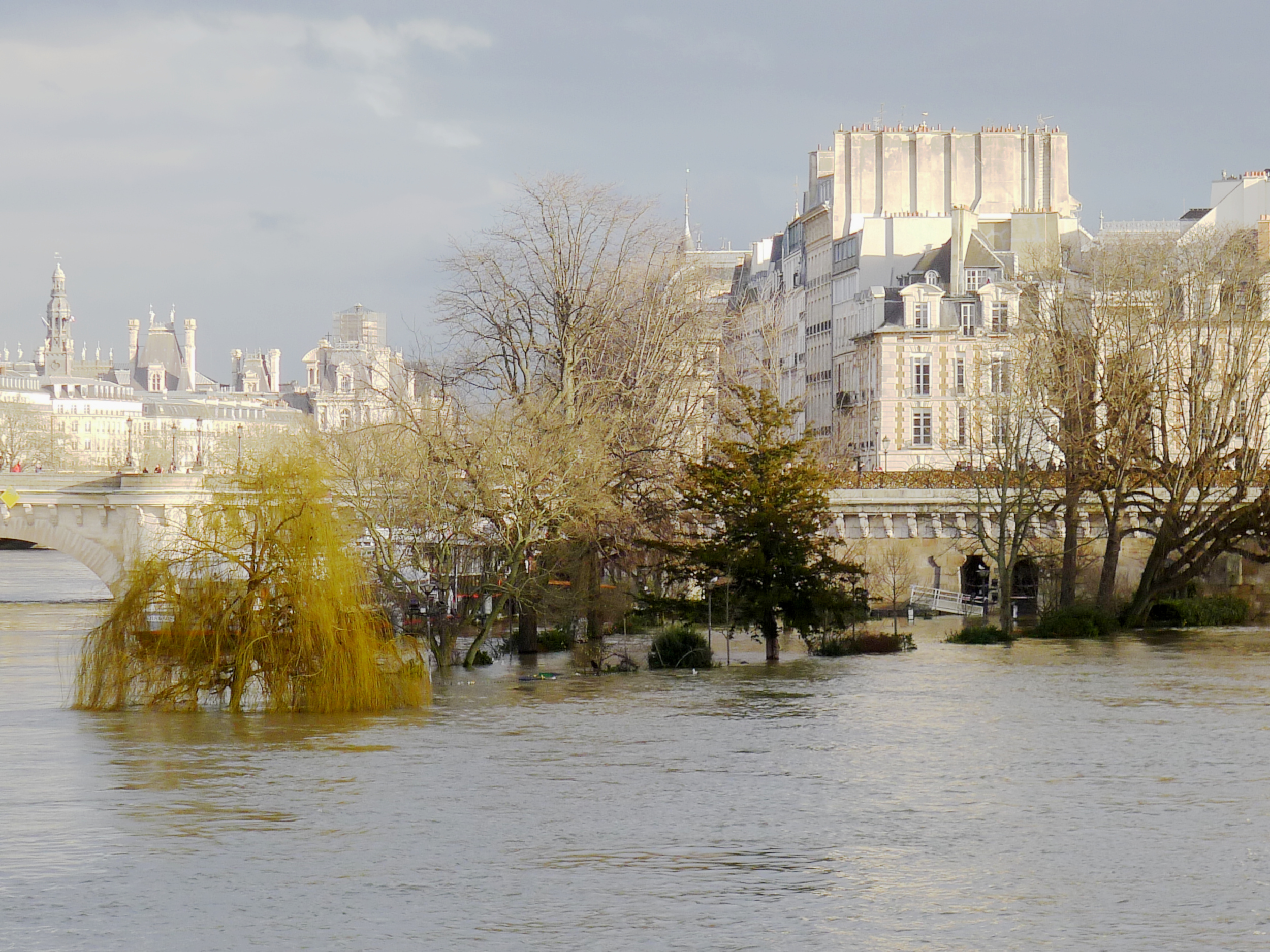
Park flooded in January 2018

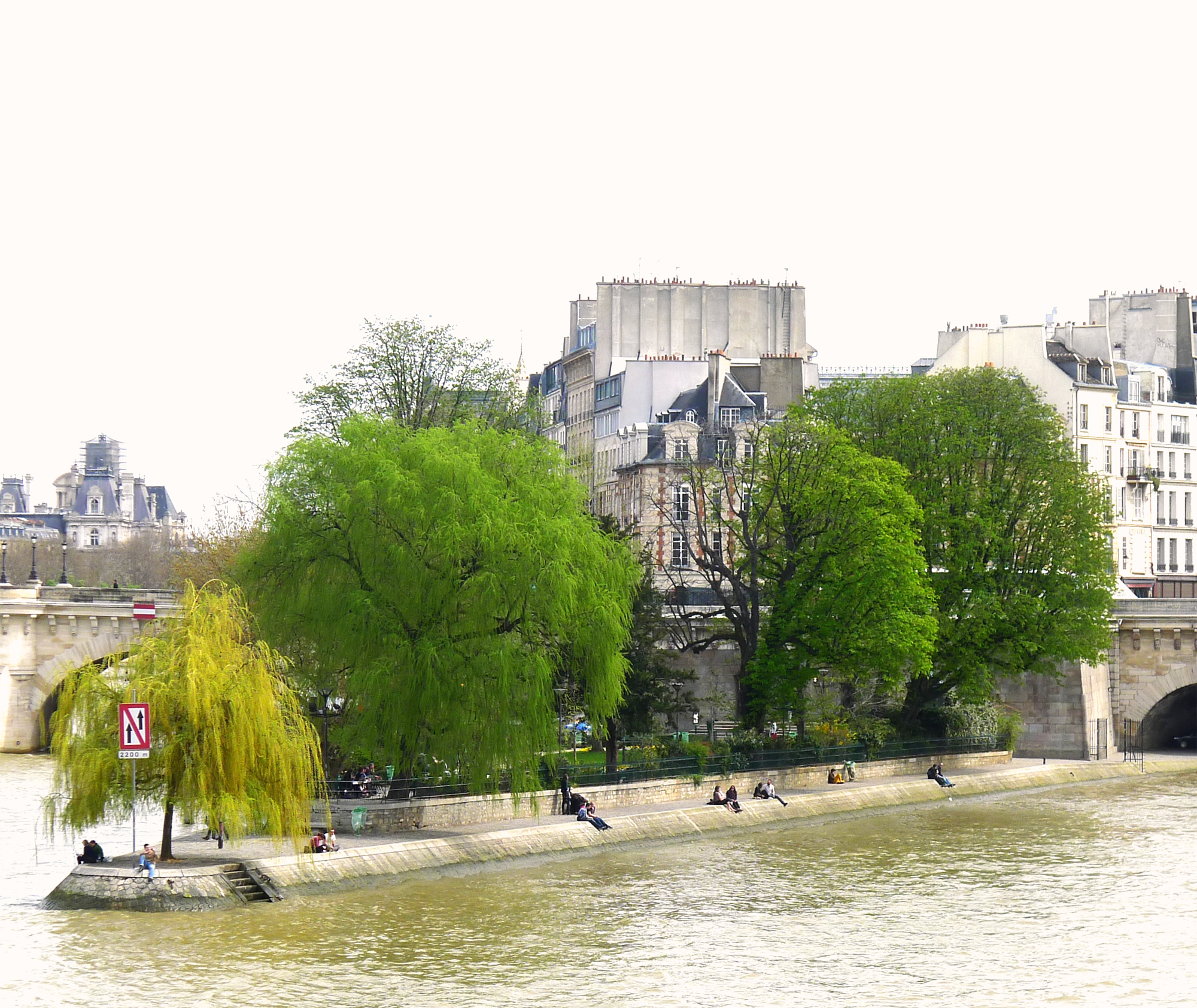
Square du Vert-Galant

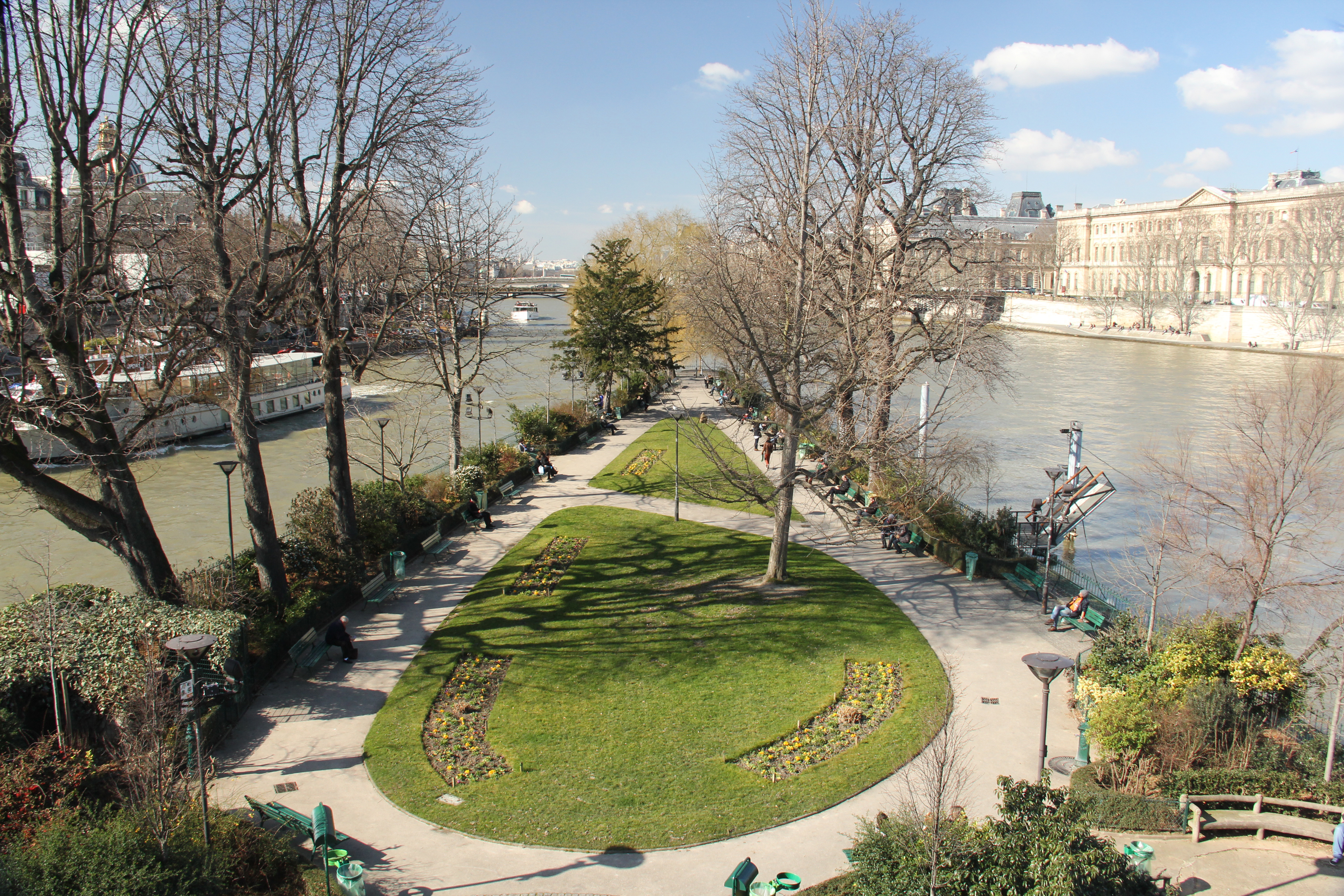
Square in 2015

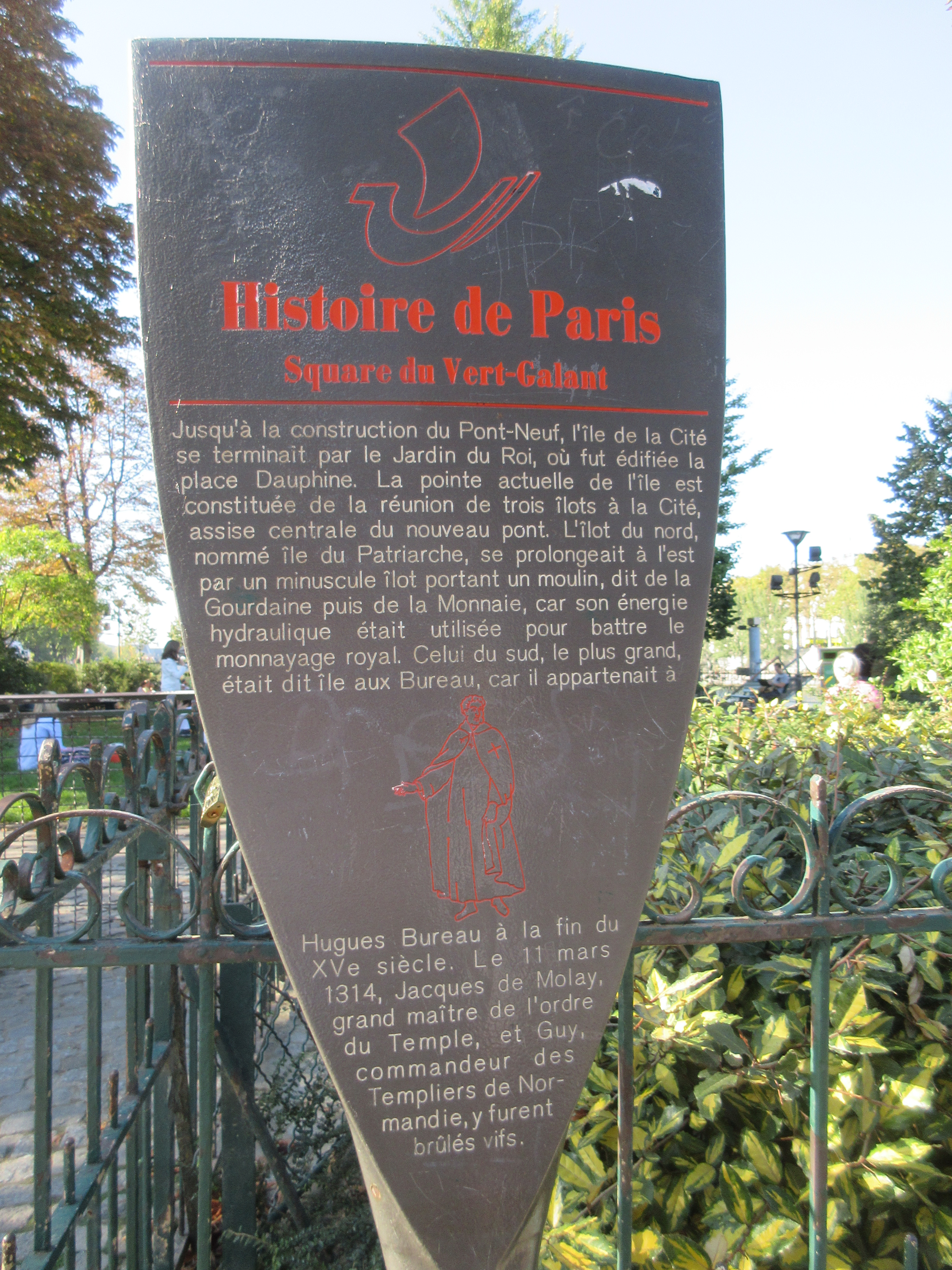
Molay commemorative plaque

== See also ==
- Île de la Cité
- Equestrian statue of Henry IV

== Bibliography ==
- Lecompte, Francis (2013). Notre-Dame, Île de la Cité et Île Saint-Louis (in English and French). Massin. ISBN 978-2-7072-0835-4.
- Sarmant, Thierry (2012). Histoire de Paris: Politique, urbanisme, civilisation. Editions Jean-Paul Gisserot. ISBN 978-2-755-803303.
- Thompson, Victoria E. ″The Creation, Destruction and Recreation of Henri IV: Seeing Popular Sovereignty in the Statue of a King.″ History and Memory, vol. 24, no. 2, 2012, pp. 5–40. JSTOR, www.jstor.org/stable/10.2979/histmemo.24.2.5.
