= Rue de Harlay =

Street in the 1st arrondissement of Paris, France

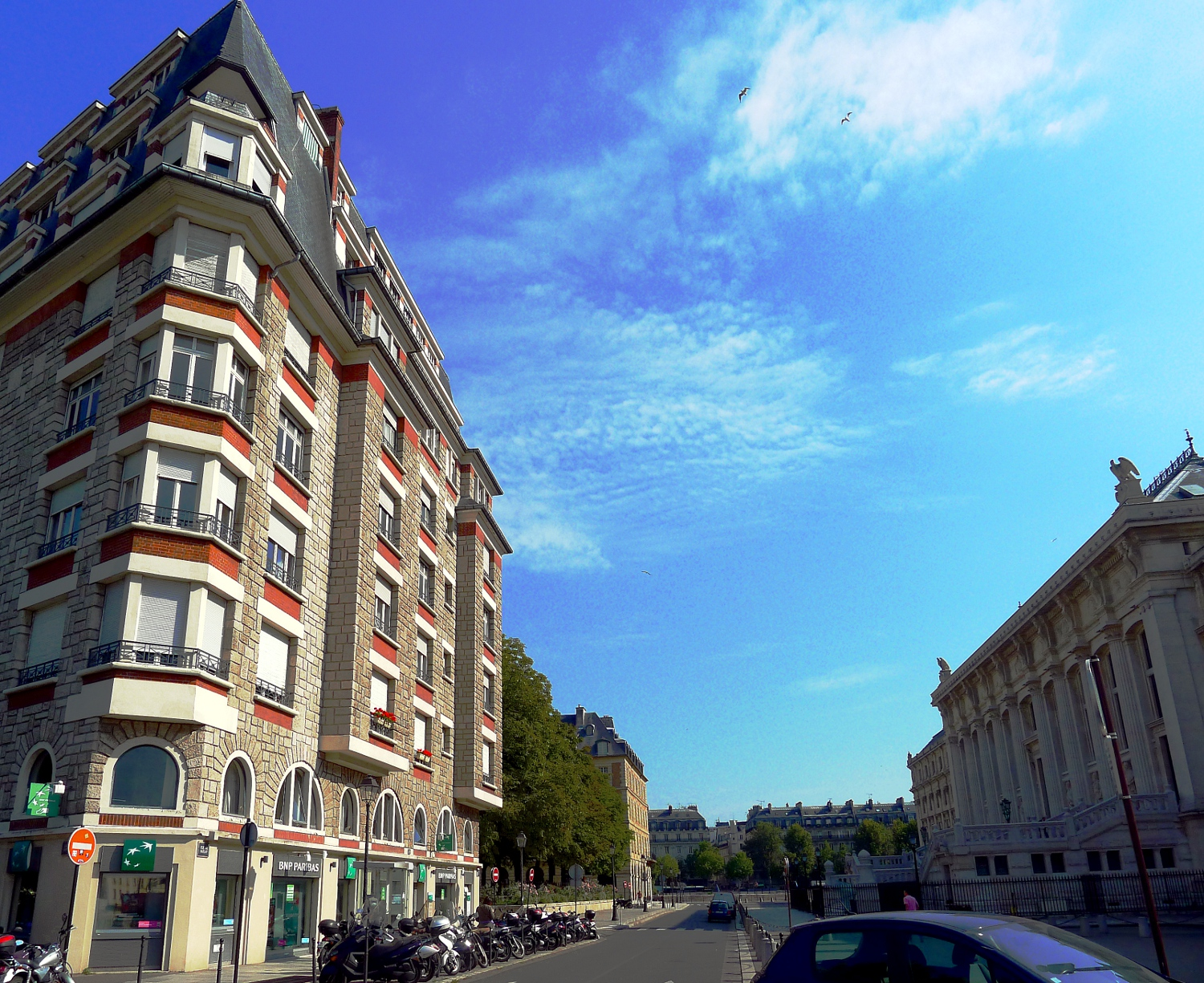
- Rue de Harlay seen from the Quai des Orfèvres

- Location within Paris
- Type: Street
- Length: 120 m (390 ft)
- Width: 21 m
- Arrondissement: 1st
- Quarter: Saint-Germain-l'Auxerrois
- Coordinates: 48.856412°N 2.343071°E
- From: 7-19, quai de l'Horloge
- To: 42, quai des Orfèvres

The Rue de Harlay is a street on the Île de la Cité in the 1st arrondissement of Paris, France.

== Location ==
The street borders the Palais de Justice to the west and the Place Dauphine to the east.

== Name ==
The street was named after Achille de Harlay (1536–1616), président à mortier and later the first speaker of the Paris Parlement.

== History ==
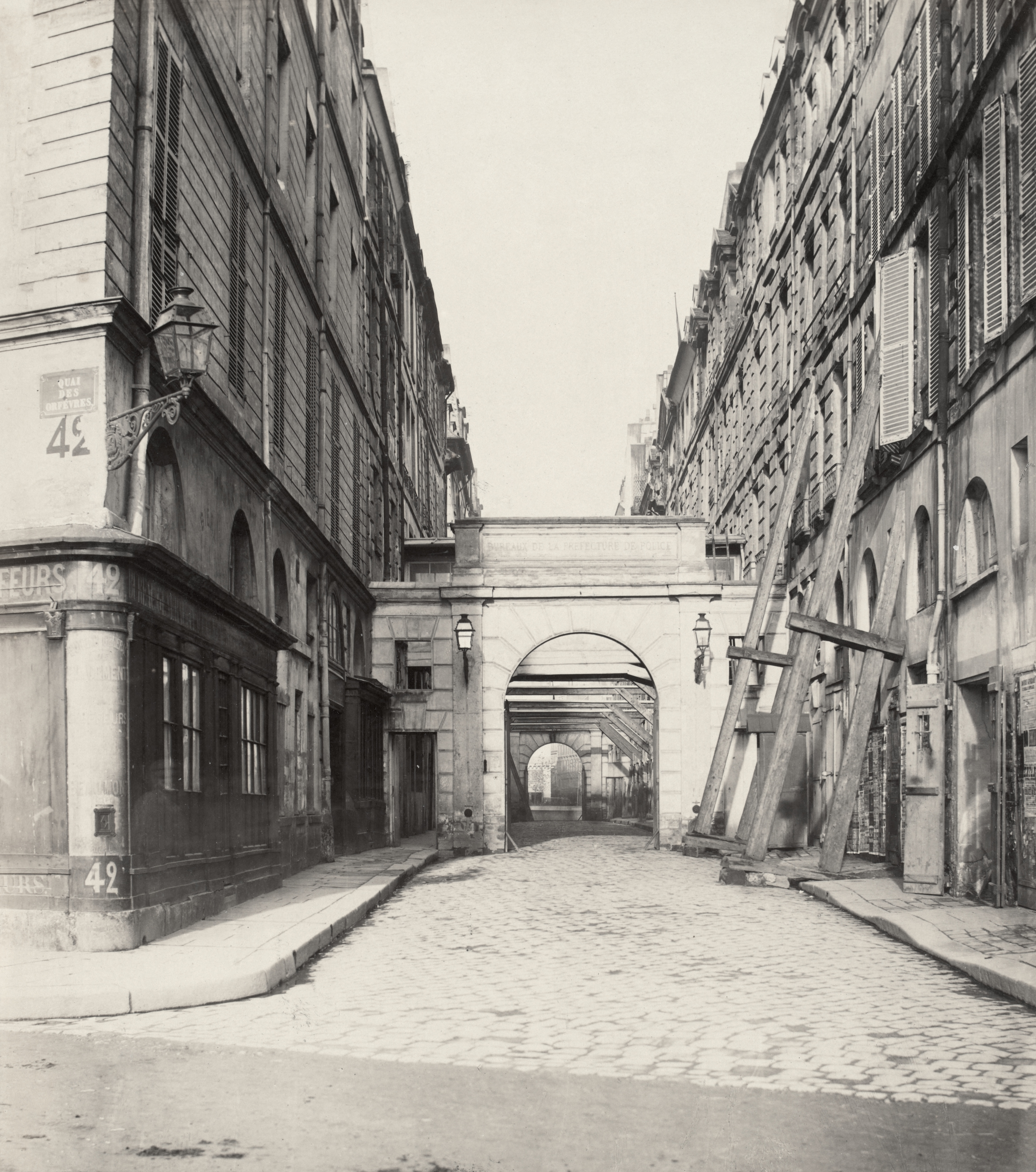
The street before it was enlarged in the 1870s

An 8.75-meter-wide street was traced around 1607 on land plots granted to Achille de Harlay. The street ran along the wall of the bailiwick hall gardens, the Jardins du roi. After buildings were erected on the former gardens in 1671, an open pathway was opened toward the Place Dauphine between the Rue de Harlay and the Cour Harlay.

In 1702, the street had 36 houses and 7 street lanterns. It was part of the Cité quarter.

An extension project of the Palais de Justice, declared of public interest by an order dated 26 May 1840, aimed to demolish the houses located at odd numbers in order to clear the view on the new buildings. But the Paris Police Prefecture, then located at Cour Harlay, occupied the empty houses after their owners were expropriated. The houses were actually destroyed in 1871–72 to enable the completion of the grand outside steps by Joseph-Louis Duc. The even-number houses that delimited Place Dauphine were demolished in 1874 to clear the view on the new Palais.

The building at No. 2, Rue de Harlay, is listed as a historic monument. It is the only remaining 17th-century building of the street.

The street was also called Harlay-au-Palais to distinguish it from Harlay-au-Marais in the 3rd arrondissement. The latter was re-named Rue des Arquebusiers in 1879.

== Notable buildings ==
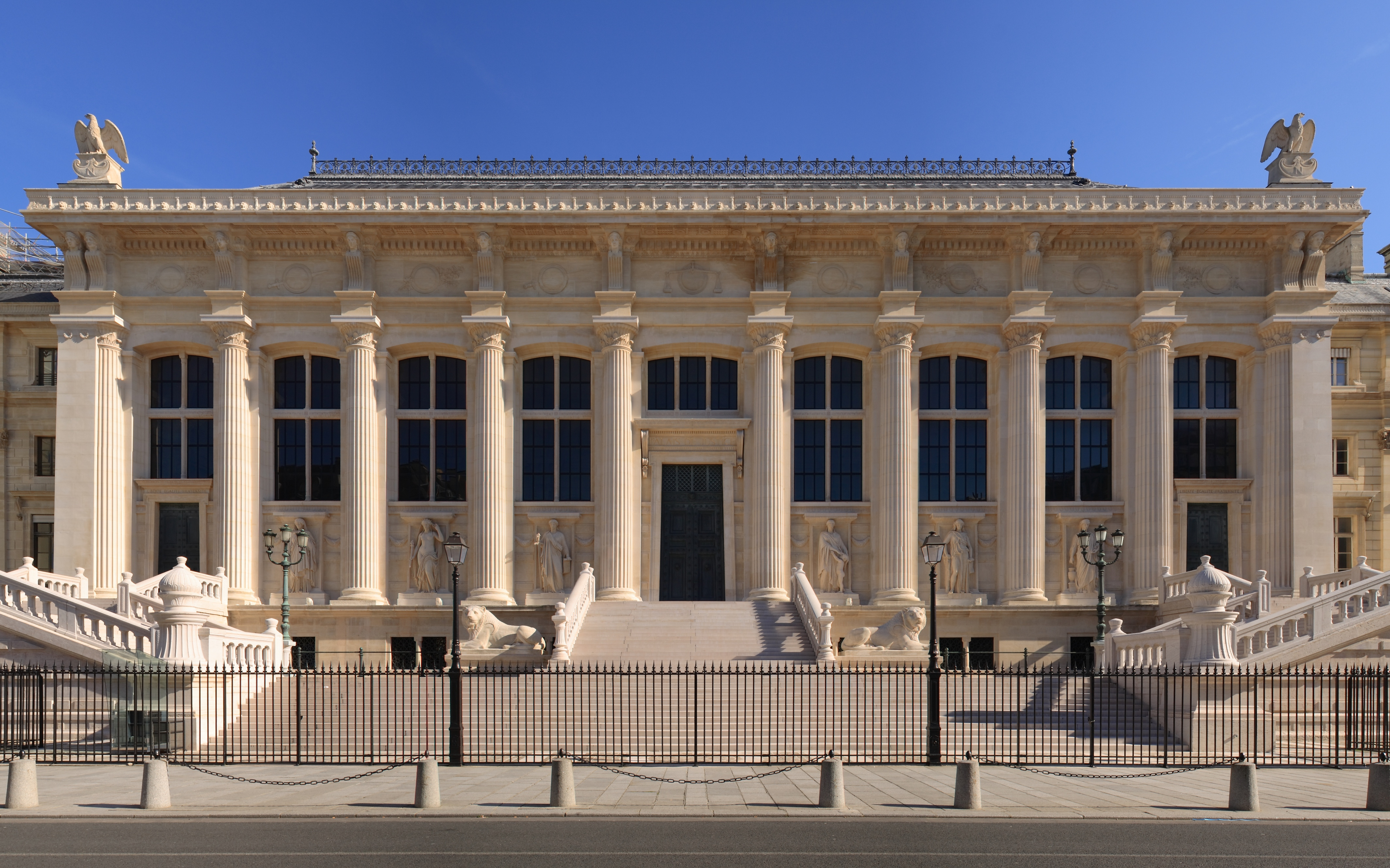
Western façade of the Palais de Justice on the Rue de Harlay (entrance of the cour d'assises).

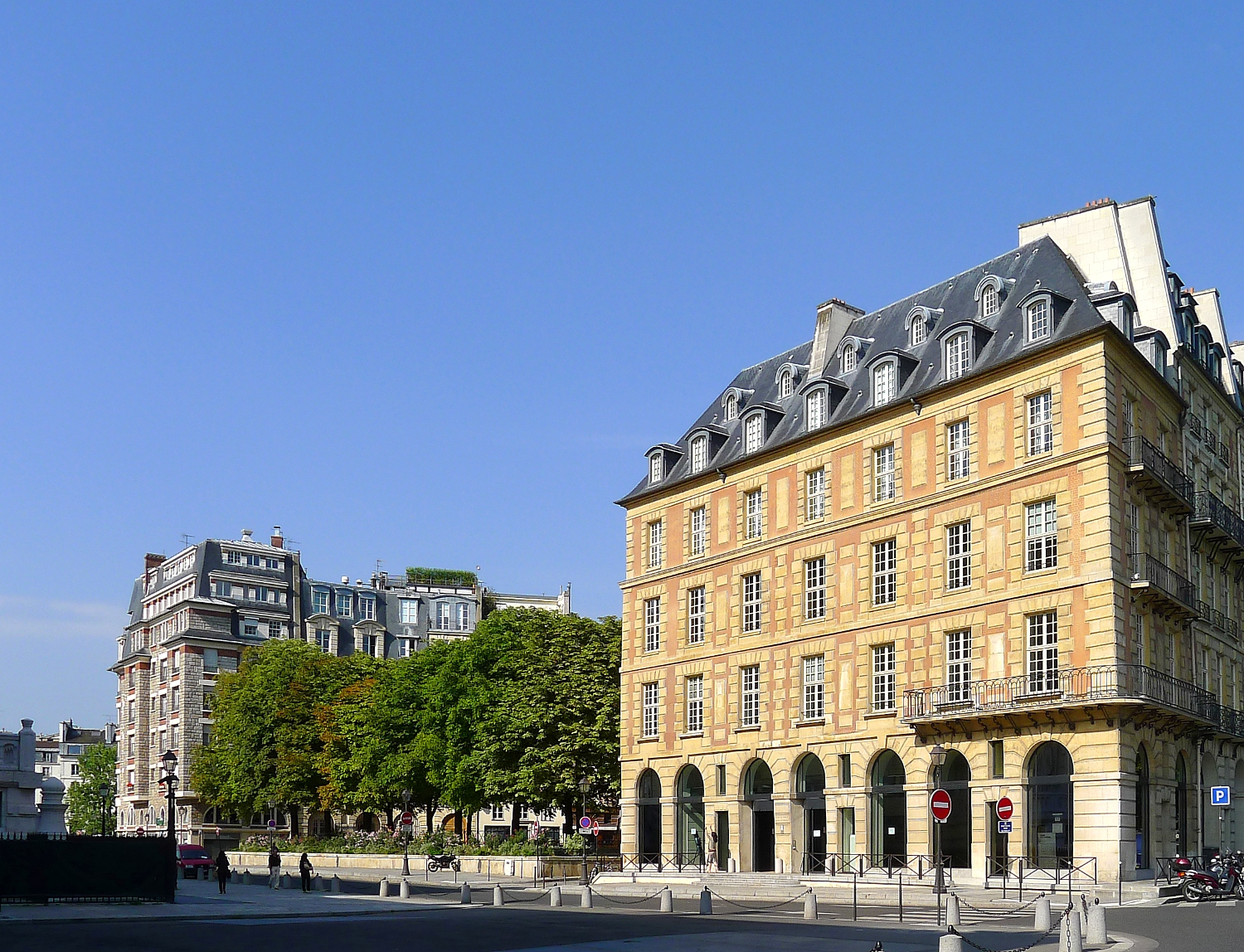
Rue de Harlay seen from the Quai de l'Horloge. In the foreground: Hôtel de Barlay (Maison du Barreau), the building at no. 2. Place Dauphine is behind the trees.

== See also ==
- List of streets in the 1st arrondissement of Paris
