= Sainte-Françoise, Quebec =

Sainte-Françoise, Quebec may refer to:

- Sainte-Françoise, Centre-du-Québec, Quebec, in Bécancour Regional County Municipality
- Sainte-Françoise, Bas-Saint-Laurent, Quebec, in Les Basques Regional County Municipality
