= Francesco Matraire =

Italian stamp designer

Francesco Matraire was a printer in Turin, notable as the designer and producer of the earliest postage stamps of Sardinia and later Italy.

Little is known of his life; his family is believed to have been from Nice originally, and his correspondence is mostly written in French.

In 1850, when Piedmont decided to adopt the use of stamps to prepay for postal service, their first thought was to inquire in Paris about how stamps were designed and manufactured. But the report included a mention of an ongoing dispute over appropriate fees for engravers, so with only a couple months left before the stamps were to go on sale, the authorities turned to a local resource in the form of Matraire, whose prior experience was in labels for patent medicines and the general printing needs of Turin.

Matraire did not have facilities for recess printing, so his first stamps were produced by lithography, later (1855) switching to letterpress. The authorities being concerned about forgery, he proposed the embossing that was used in the stamps of 1853 and thereafter.

The last stamp produced by Matraire was the 15c blue issued in February 1863. Thereafter he mostly disappears from history, although he was known to be alive in 1884.
