= Île aux Juifs =

Former island in Paris, France

Coordinates: 48°51′26″N 2°20′25″E

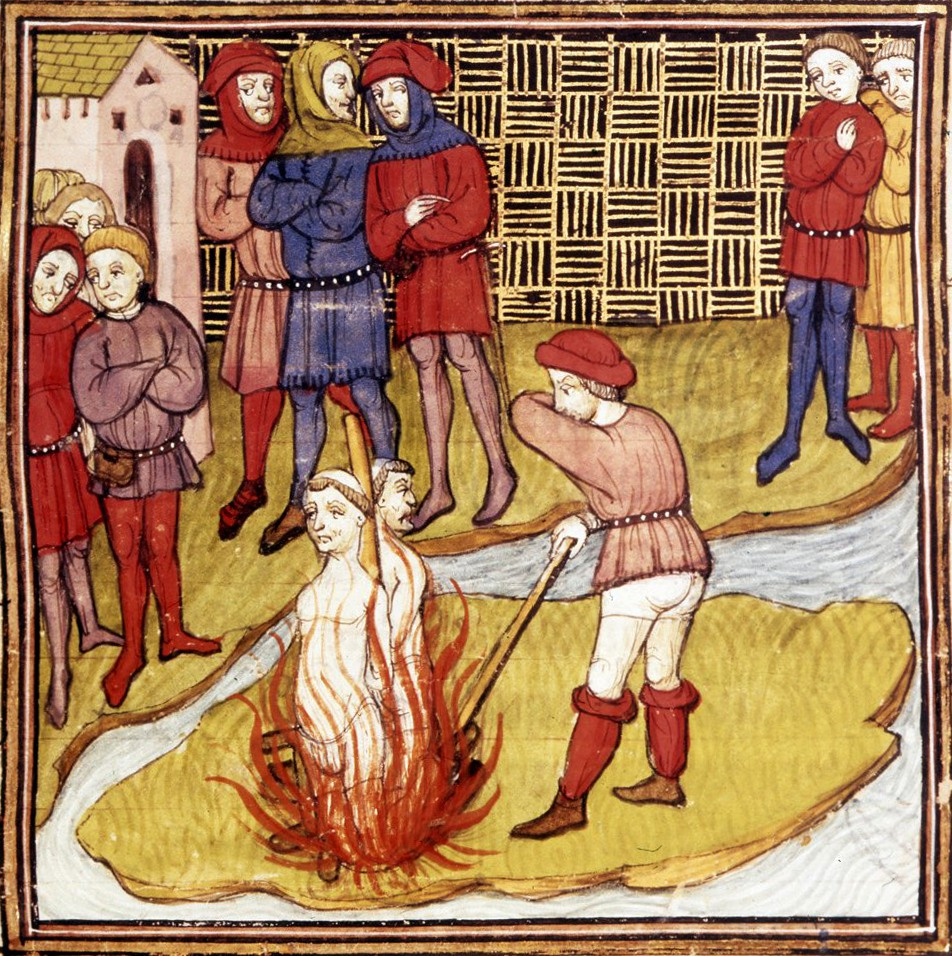
Execution of Jacques de Molay on the ile aux Juifs, March 18, 1314 (miniature du Maître de Virgile. Grandes Chroniques de France, vers 1380, BL, Royal MS 20 C vii, f.48r.

Île aux Juifs, Paris (literally Island of the Jews or Jewish Island), also called Île des Templiers, was a small island on the Seine in Paris situated just west of the Île de la Cité. The island was named for the number of executions of Jews that took place on it during the Middle Ages. It was on this island that Jacques de Molay, the last Grand Master of the Knights Templar, and another Templar leader, Geoffroi de Charney, were burnt to death for heresy on 18 March 1314. The island, along with two other small islands next to it, were joined to the Île de la Cité when the Pont Neuf was built across it between 1578 and 1604.

== History ==
The island was located just to the west of tip of the Île de la Cité, approximately where the Square du Vert-Galant is today. It was overlooked by the tower of the old royal palace at the end of the Île de la Cité and was opposite the Tour de Nesle, a smaller royal castle on the left bank of the Seine. The island alongside it, of similar size, was called the Île à la Gourdaine, and was the location of a mill. A third, very small island, made of gravel, was at the very point, and was called the Motte aux Papelards, or Terrain. The addition of the three small islands at the end, plus the constructions of quays alongside, increased the size of the Île de la Cité from about eight hectares (20 acres) in Roman times to seventeen hectares (42 acres) today. In the Middle Ages the island was the property of the Abbey of Saint-Germain-des-Pres.

== Name ==
The island was also known at various times as the Île aux Treilles, Ile de Justice, Île de Galilee, and Ile aux Bureaux, and as the Île des Templiers.

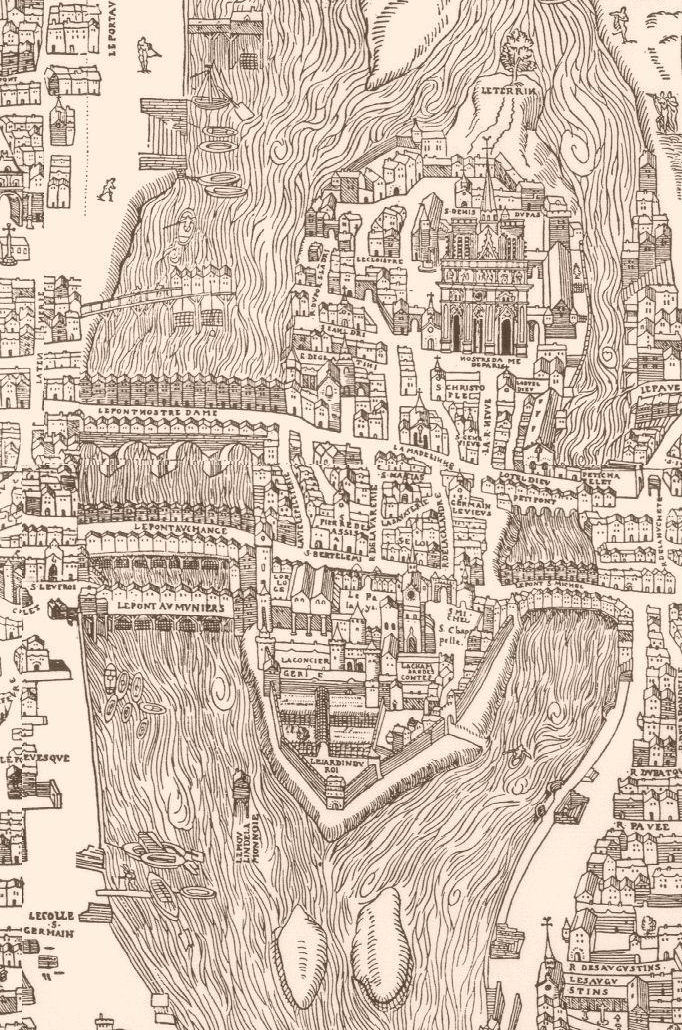
The Ile aux Juifs (bottom right), on the Plan de Bâle (1552)

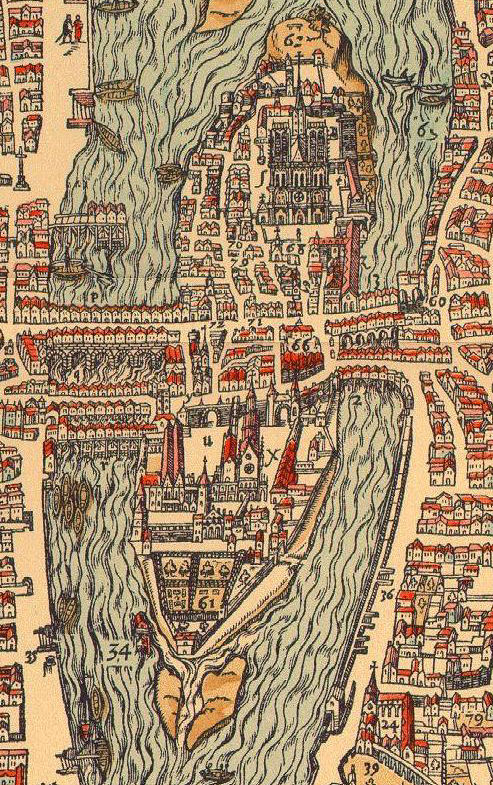
The island on the Plan de Belleforest (1575)

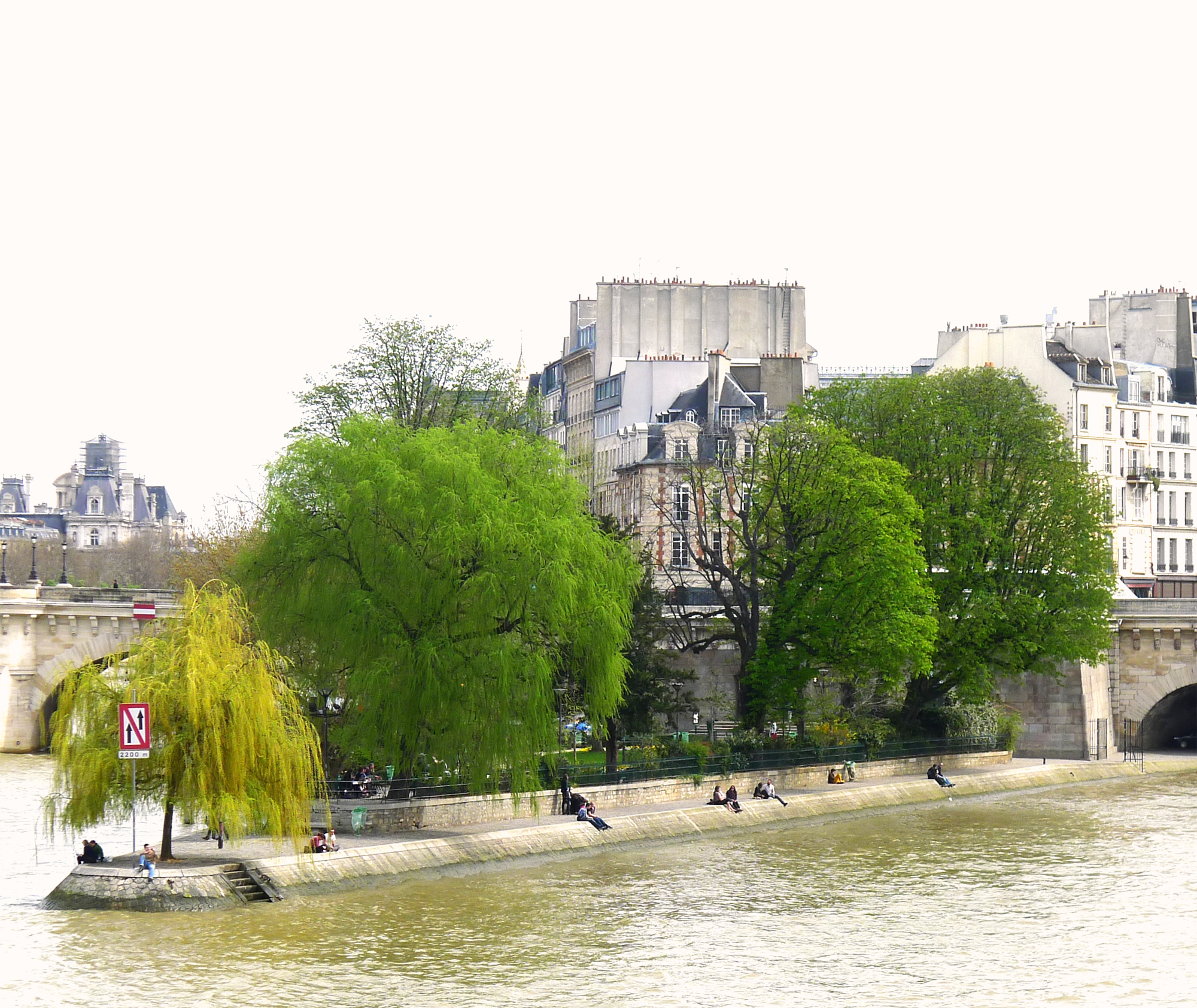
The "Island" today, part of the Square du Vert-Galant

== Bibliography ==
- Hillairet, Jacques (2017). Connaissance du Vieux Paris (in French). Payot. ISBN 9782228919111.
- Fierro, Alfred (1996). Histoire et Dictionnaire de Paris (in French). Robert Laffont. ISBN 2-221-07862-4.
- Dictionnaire Historique de Paris (in French). La Pochothèque- Le Livre de Poche. 2013. ISBN 978-2-253-13140-3.
