= Marie-Françoise Peignon =

Marie-Françoise Peignon née Allard (1818-1876) was a French businessperson. She was the founder of the famous masquerade costume company La maison Peignon-Costumiers (1853).

== Life and career ==
Marie-Françoise Allard was born to a miller in Nantes in 1818. She was an apprentice of a tailor, and married Mathurin-Aimé Peignon in 1835, with whom she had three children.

She was widowed in 1844. In order to support her children as a widow, she started a workshop in her home, sewing costumes for the annual carnival in Nantes. She became successful enough to support herself on the commissions, and eventually started to receive orders to sew costumes for theatres. She developed her business to a successful firm manufacturing masquerade and stage costumes. Among her known clients were Virginie Déjazet.

Her company was taken over by her children upon her death and continued in operation until 2006. In 2023 an exposition was held in Nantes depicting her business enterprise.
