= Place Dauphine =

Square in Paris, France

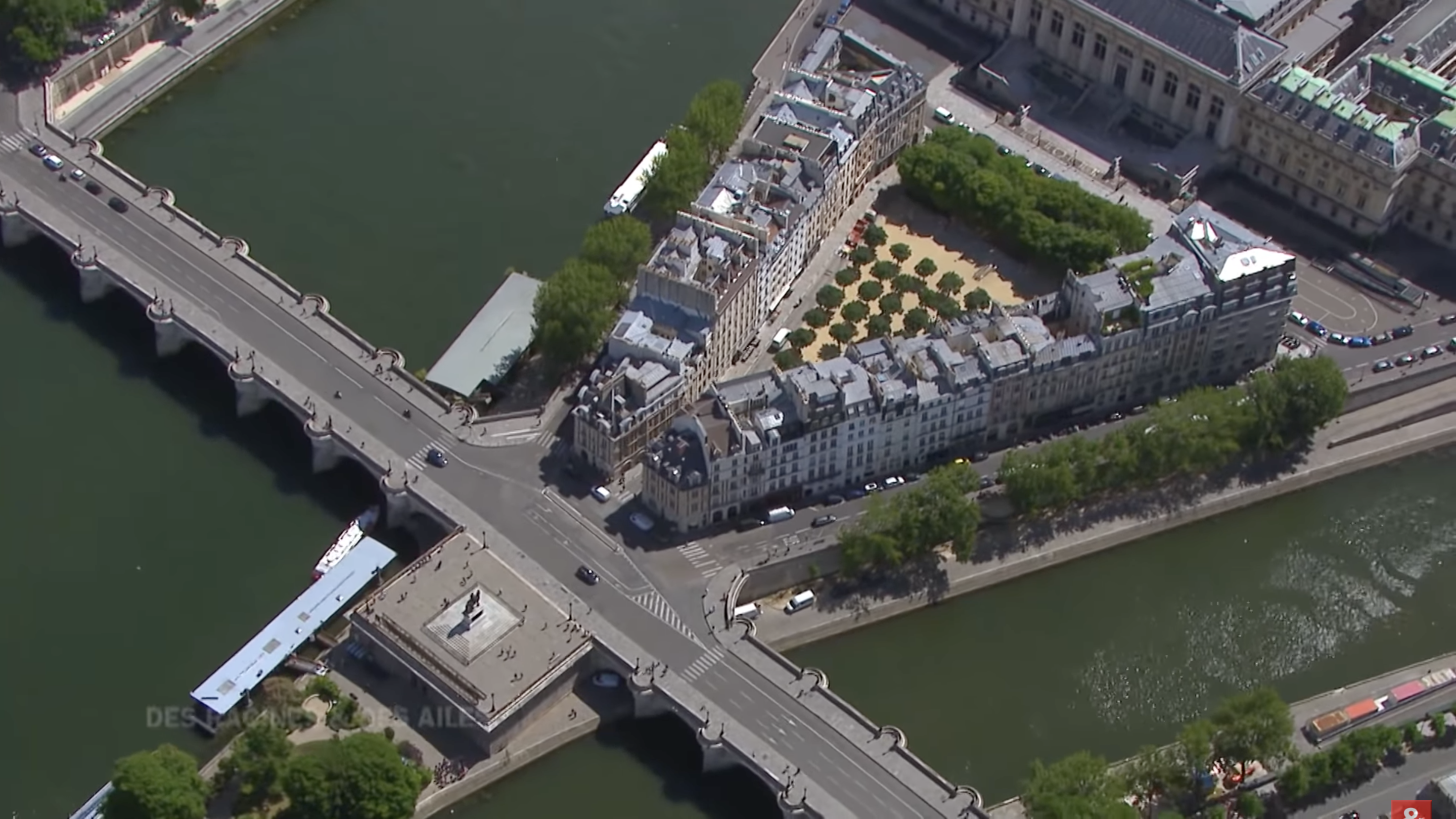
- The Place Dauphine in 2018

- Location within Paris
- Length: 102 m (335 ft)
- Width: 12 to 67 m (39 to 220 ft)
- Arrondissement: 1st
- Quarter: Saint-Germain-l'Auxerrois, Île de la Cité
- Coordinates: 48°51′23.54″N 2°20′32.74″E
- From: Rue de Harlay
- To: Rue Henri Robert

Construction
- Completion: 1607-1616
- Denomination: 1607-1792, then 1814

The Place Dauphine (French pronunciation: [plas dofin]) is a public square located near the western end of the Île de la Cité in the 1st arrondissement of Paris. It was initiated by Henry IV in 1607, the second of his projects for public squares in Paris, the first being the Place Royale (now the Place des Vosges). He named it for his son, the Dauphin of France and future Louis XIII, who had been born in 1601. From the "square", actually triangular in shape, one can access the middle of the Pont Neuf, a bridge which connects the left and right banks of the Seine by passing over the Île de la Cité. A street called, since 1948, Rue Henri-Robert, forty metres long, connects the Place Dauphine and the bridge. Where they meet, there are two other named places, the Place du Pont-Neuf and the Square du Vert-Galant.

== History ==
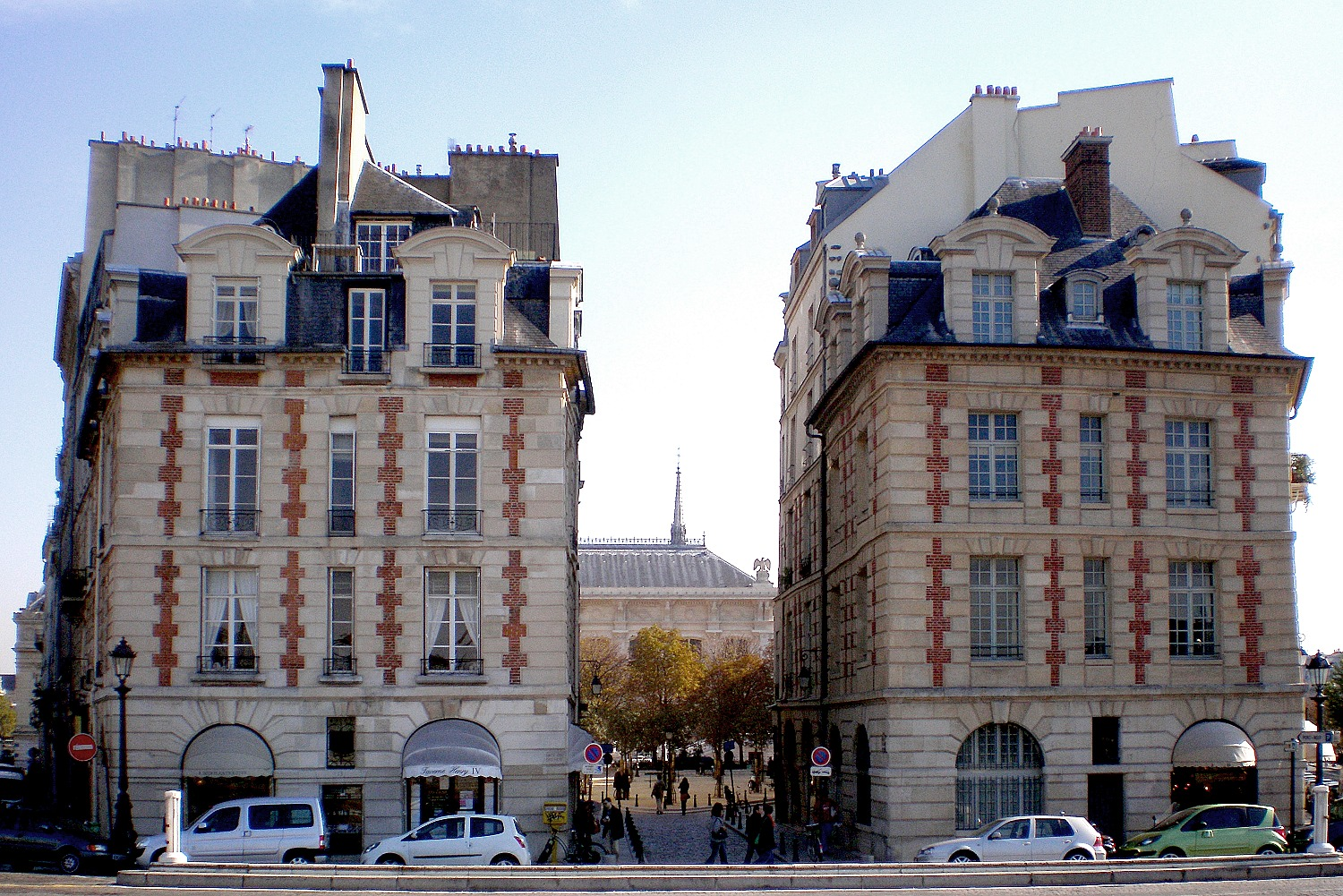
Two buildings erected c. 1612, facing the Pont Neuf and flanking the entrance to the Place Dauphine

Before the construction of the Place Dauphine, the site was occupied by a trapezoidal plot of land called the King's Orchard [le Verger du roi].

The Place Dauphine was laid out in 1607–10, when the Place Royale was still under construction. It was among the earliest city-planning projects of Henri IV, and was on a site created from part of the western garden of the walled enclave known as the Palais de la Cité (because the Capetian kings had lived there long ago, before the Louvre was built). There had been a pavilion, the Maison des Etuves, located in the garden's western wall which overlooked two riverine islets, scarcely more than mudbanks at the time. One islet was incorporated into filled land which extended the Île de la Cité to the west to form the middle section, the terre-plein, of the Pont Neuf (completed in 1606) and, on the downstream side of the bridge, a platform supporting an equestrian statue of Henri IV (installed in 1614). The second islet was removed. The Place Dauphine was to occupy the western part of the garden and the vacant land which had been created between it and the bridge.

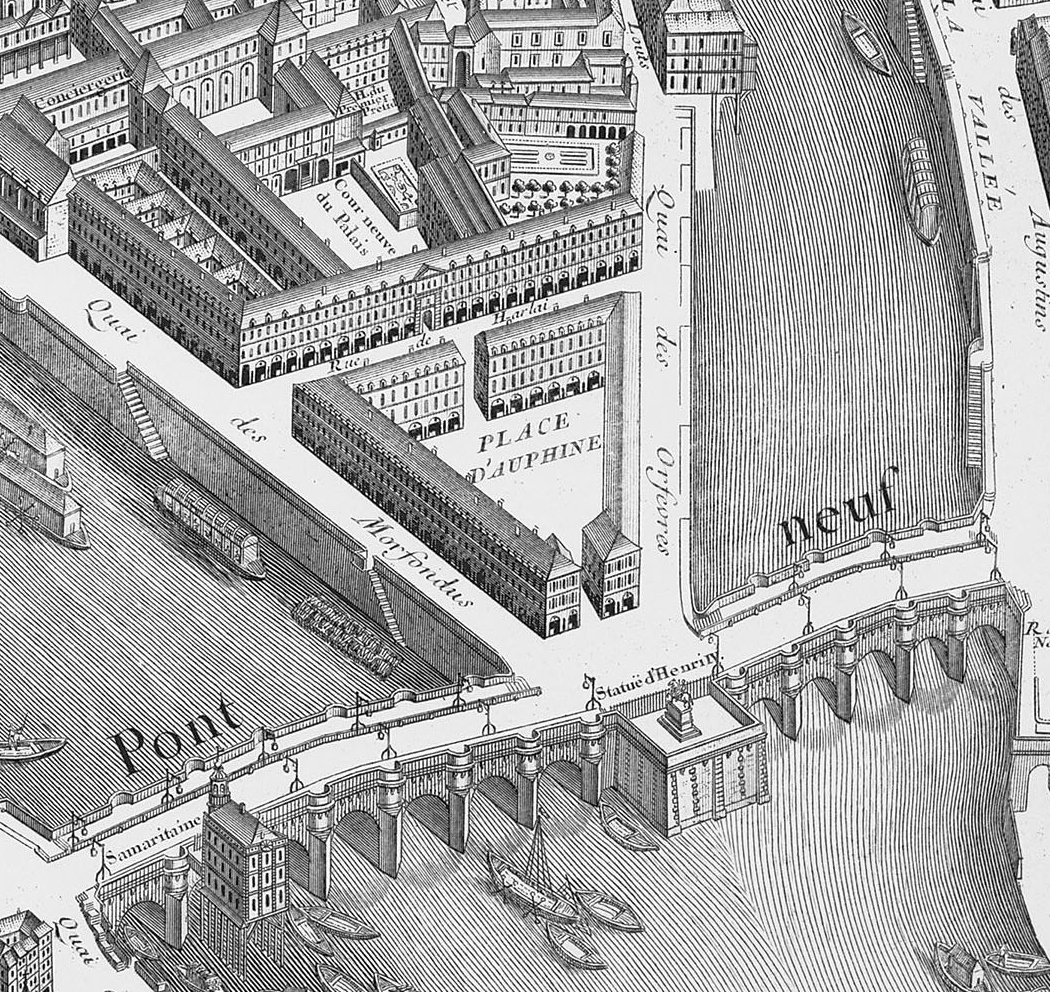
The Place Dauphine in 1739 (north is toward the lower left)

Approximately 3 acres of land was conveyed to Achille de Harlay on 10 March 1607 with instructions to execute a project according to a general plan in which the houses would adhere to a specified and repetitious facade. The development consisted of two components: a triangular square and a row of houses across from the base of the triangle on the eastern side of the rue de Harlay, with returns extending further east along the quais. There were two entrances to the square: one in the middle of the eastern range and the second at the western point, opening onto the Pont Neuf. The western ("downstream") gateway was formed by paired pavilions facing the bridge and the statue of Henri IV on its other side.

From 1802 to 1874, a fountain, accompanied by a statue depicting Louis Desaix, stood in the Place Dauphine. These had been commissioned by then-First Consul Napoleon Bonaparte in honor of his victory at the Battle of Marengo, where Desaix had been killed. This statue, sculpted by Augustin Félix Fortin, was the first erected in Paris in honor of a man who had never been a monarch.

The last of the houses to be constructed (at the southeast corner of the square) was finished in 1616. Originally all were built with more or less the specified facades, which were similar to those at the Place Royale, although the houses were more modest. Each repeating unit comprised on the ground floor two arcaded shopfronts dressed with stone between which a narrow door opened into a passage to an interior court with a steep staircase leading to two residential floors above. These were faced with brick and limestone quoins, chaînes, and tablets. At the top was an attic floor with a steep slate roof and dormers, similar to the Place Royale, except that each range at the Place Dauphine was covered by a single roof, and the dormers "gave no hint of separate houses". In fact, behind the facades, the houses themselves, built by separate buyers, varied with regard to plan and area.

Since its construction, almost all of the houses surrounding the square have been raised in height, given new facades, rebuilt, or replaced with imitations of the originals. Only two retain their original appearance, those flanking the entrance facing the Pont Neuf. In 1792 during the Revolution the Place Dauphine was renamed Place Thionville, a name it retained until 1814. The former eastern range, heavily damaged by fire during the fighting of the Paris Commune of 1871, was swept aside to open the view toward the Palais de Justice.

== Gallery ==
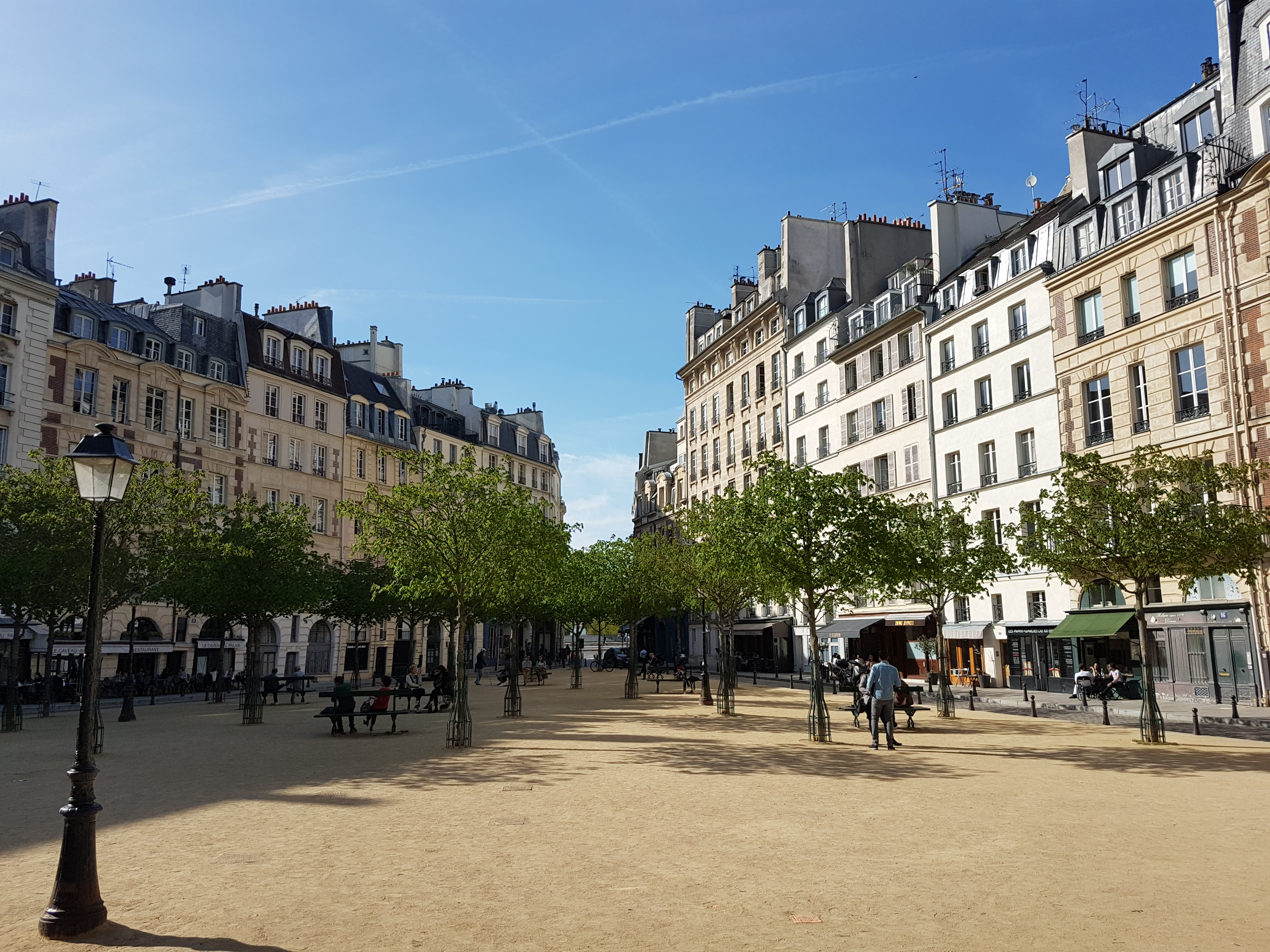
The Place Dauphine looking west toward the Pont Neuf

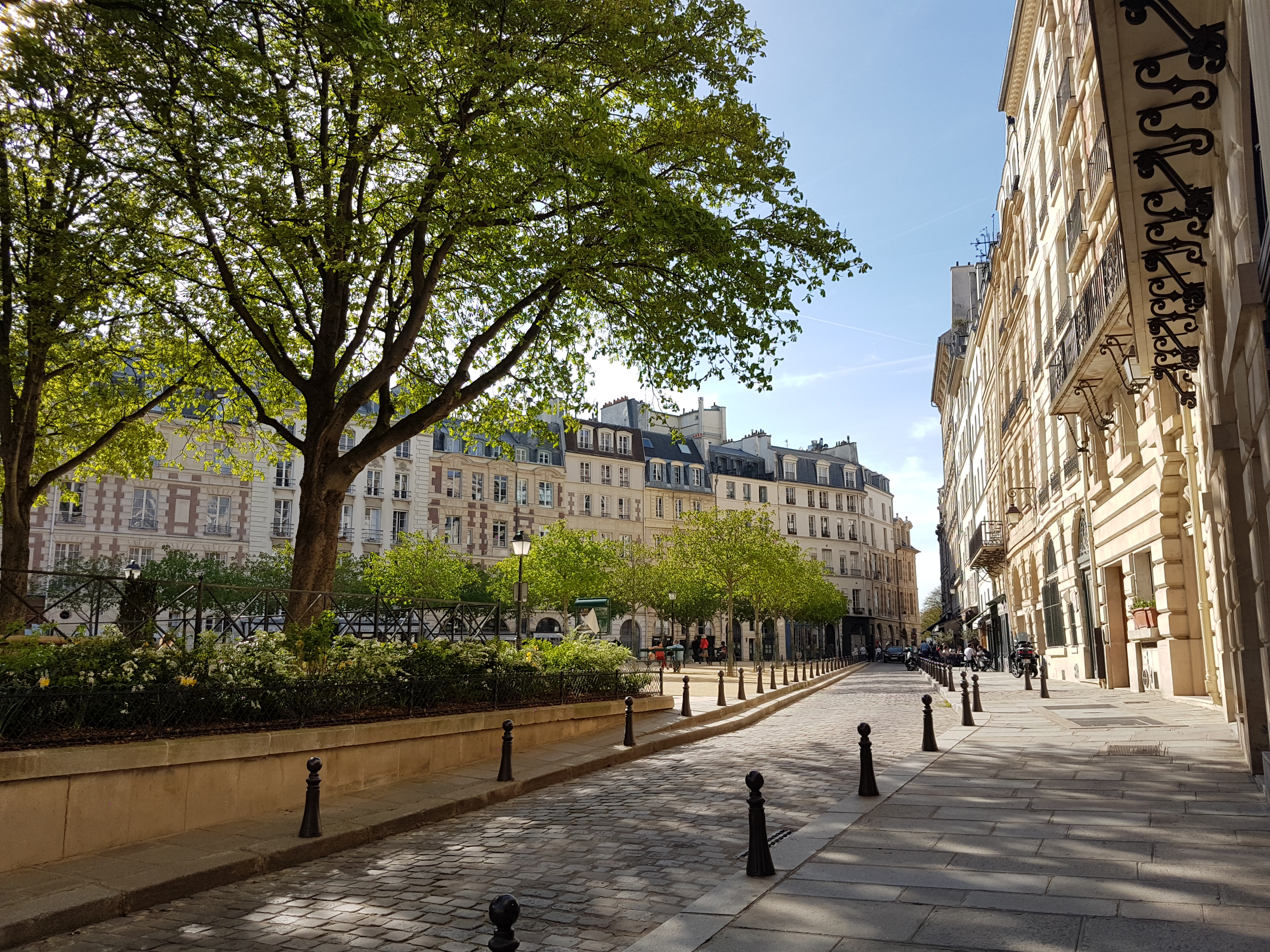
The Place Dauphine, north side

== Metro station ==
The Place Dauphine is:

Located near the Metro stations: Pont Neuf and Cité.

It is served by lines 4 and 7.
