= Nicolas-Jean-Baptiste Raguenet =

French painter

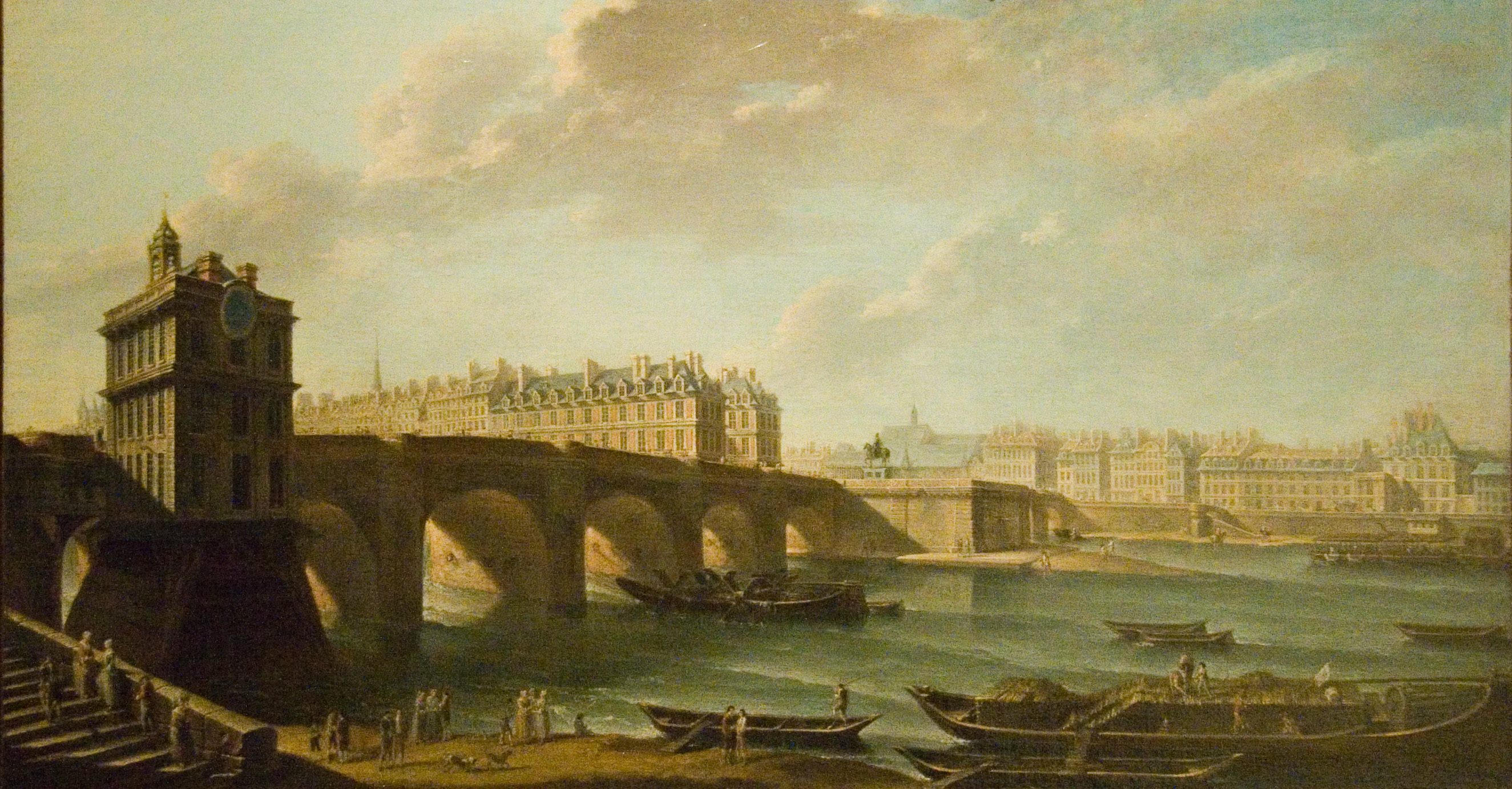
Le Pont Neuf, la Samaritaine et la pointe de la Cité.

Nicolas-Jean-Baptiste Raguenet (1715 – 17 April 1793) was a French painter born in Gentilly.

He was the son of Jean-Baptiste Raguenet (1682–1755), actor and painter, and Genevieve Murgues. The Raguenets, father and son, put together a veritable portrait of Paris with their many paintings depicting buildings and landscapes in the city.

A master painter trained at the Académie de Saint-Luc, he was responsible for many "View of Paris" paintings, notably of the Seine, with an almost photographic precision, which adds a historical interest to his works in addition to their artistic value. Many of his works were acquired by the Carnavalet Museum in 1882.

== Works ==
His known paintings include:

- Vue de l’Archevêché (1750)
- L’Hôtel de Ville et la place de Grève (1751)
- Le cabaret à l’Image Notre-Dame, sur la place de Grève (1751)
- Maisons du cloître Notre-Dame, donnant sur la rivière (1753)
- La joute des mariniers, entre le pont Notre-Dame et le Pont-au-Change (1756)
- Vue des hauteurs de Chaillot (1757)
- Le Palais des Tuileries (1757, in the Carnavalet Museum)
- Le Pont-Neuf et le quai des Orfèvres (1759)
- Le Louvre et le Pont Neuf (1760)
- Vue de la Seine à Ivry (vers 1760)
- Le château de Menars (1762 - commissioned by Madame de Pompadour)
- L’Incendie de l’Hôtel-Dieu (1772)
- Le Pont Neuf et la Samaritaine (1777)
- L’Ile Saint-Louis
- L’Hôtel Bretouvilliers
- L’Arsenal
- L’Ile Louviers
- Le Quai de la Salpétrière (Vue des bords de la Seine aux environs de la Salpétrière)
- Le Village de Chaillot
- Vue du Pont-Neuf avec la Samaritaine

== Gallery ==
List of paintings
Image	Description	Year	Collection
	The enclosure of the Chartreux Monastery near Paris. The view is from the interior of the enclosure, which is surrounded by walls. To the left can be seen the Chartreux windmill, in the background Mount Valérien, the dome of the Eglise des Invalides, the dome of Church of the Carmelites, and at the right the Church of the Chartreux with its lantern and spire.		Musée Carnavalet
	The Boatmen's Tournament on the Seine River, downstream of the Pont Notre-Dame	1751	Musée Carnavalet
	Perspective view of the Rue de la Mortellerie (now the Rue de l'Hôtel-de-Ville); to its left, the house with the Cabaret L'Image Notre-Dame; to its right, houses facing the Seine River; and in the foreground, the Place de Grève (now the Place de l'Hôtel de Ville)	1751	Musée Carnavalet
	View of the western (downstream) end of the Île Saint-Louis and the eastern end of the Île de la Cité with Notre-Dame de Paris in the background	1752	
	The Hôtel de Ville and the Place de Grève	1753	Musée Carnavalet
	Cloister houses of Notre-Dame at the eastern (upstream) end of the Île de la Cité	1753	Musée Carnavalet
	View of the western end of the Île Saint-Louis and the Pont Rouge (now the Pont Saint-Louis), seen from the Place de Grève	circa 1754	Musée Carnavalet
	View from the Pont Royal upstream toward the Pont Neuf and the Place Dauphine, with the Louvre on the left and the Collège des Quatre-Nations on the right	1755	Musée Carnavalet
	View of the Archbishop's Palace of Paris, the Pont de la Tournelle and the Île Saint-Louis	1756	Musée Carnavalet
	The eastern (upstream) end of the Île Saint-Louis with the former Hôtel de Bretonvilliers and the Hôtel Lambert	1757	Musée Carnavalet
	View upstream toward the Pont Marie with the Quai des Ormes (now the Quai de l'Hôtel de Ville) on the left and the Île Saint-Louis on the right	1757	Musée Carnavalet
	The western façade of the former Tuileries Palace, seen from the Quai d'Orsay (the portion since 1947 known as the Quai Anatole-France)	1757	Musée Carnavalet
	View of the eastern (upstream) side of the south arm of the Pont Neuf, with the Left Bank's Quai des Grands-Augustins on the left and the Quai des Orfèvres [fr] on the Île de la Cité on the right, and in the distance, on the Right Bank: the Louvre, the Petite Galerie, and the initial section of the Grande Galerie	circa 1760	Musée Carnavalet
	View of Paris from the Pont Neuf, with the Louvre on the right and the former Hôtel de Conti on the Quai de Conti and Collège des Quatre-Nations on the left	1763	Getty Museum
	View of the western (downstream) side of the Pont Neuf from the Right Bank, with the Collège des Quatre-Nations on the right	1763	Getty Museum
	View of the Pompe de la Samaritaine and the western (downstream) side of the Pont Neuf from the Quai du Louvre, with the Quai de Conti and the former Hôtel de Conti on the far side (Left Bank) of the river	before 1771	Musée Carnavalet
	View of the Place Dauphine and the western (downstream) side of the Pont Neuf, seen from the Quai de Conti	1772	Musée Carnavalet
	View of the Pompe de la Samaritaine and the northern segment of the Pont Neuf, seen from the Quai de la Mégisserie on the Right Bank. The eleven bays of the left wing of the Hôtel des Monnaies, constructed 1767–1775, can be seen on the far side of the river.	1777	Musée Carnavalet
