= Edwina Florence Wills =

American artist, musician, and composer

Edwina Florence Wheeler Wills (December 5, 1915 – December 1, 2002) was an American artist and composer who played cello and piano. A native of Des Moines, Iowa, she received a B.A. from Grinnell College. On Feb 3, 1939, she married Luther Max Wills and they had four children.

Wills played cello in the Des Moines Symphony Orchestra, as well as in the Salem and Eugene Symphony Orchestras, both in Oregon. In 1971, she became the principal cellist in the Portland, Oregon, Chamber Orchestra. She taught chamber music at Lewis and Clark College and taught cello at Washington State University.

Wills sculpted and painted in oil and watercolor, exhibiting at the Art Institute of Chicago. One of her works was a medieval-style chess set consisting of eight sculptures: a king, a queen, and six other chess pieces.

Her musical compositions include:

- Fugue in F Major (piano)
- Radiance and Glory (violin, cello, voice and piano; based on text by Giovanni Giocondo)
- String Quartet in g minor (first prize in Washington State Federation of Music Clubs Competition, 1941)
- Theme and Variations (cello and piano)
