= Pont Notre-Dame =

Bridge in Paris, France

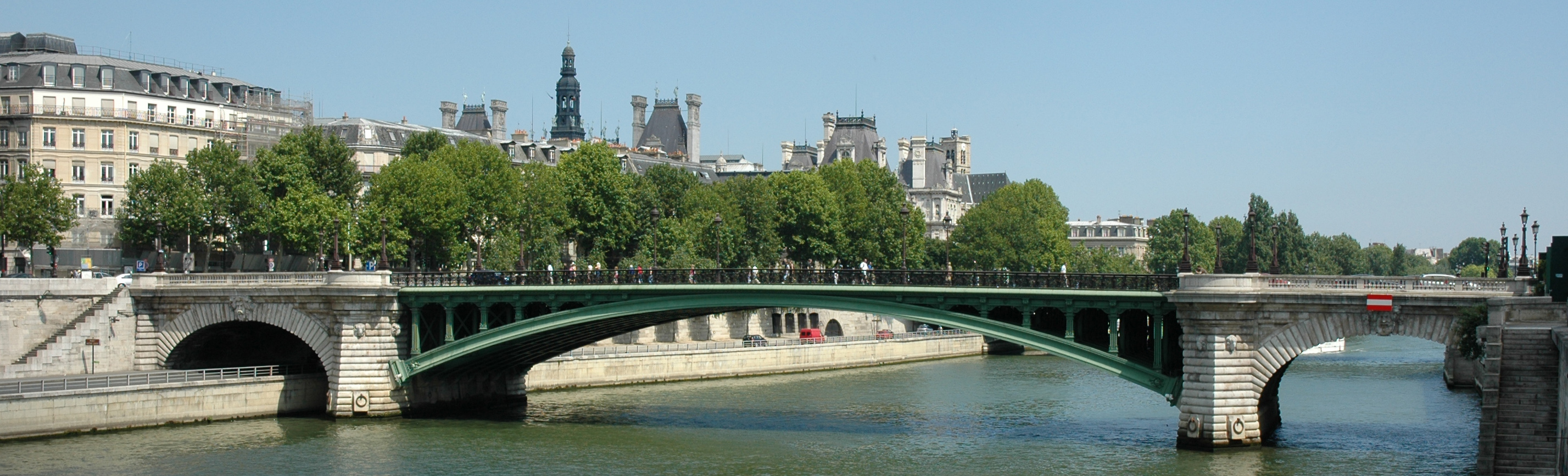
- The Pont Notre-Dame in Paris.
- Coordinates: 48°51′21.77″N 02°20′54.81″E
- Carries: Motor vehicles, pedestrians, and bicycles
- Crosses: The Seine River
- Locale: Paris, France
- Next upstream: Pont d'Arcole
- Next downstream: Pont au Change

Characteristics
- Design: Arch Bridge
- Total length: 105 metres (344 ft)
- Width: 20 metres (66 ft)
- Clearance below: ?

History
- Construction start: 1910
- Construction end: 1914

Statistics
- Toll: Free both ways

The Pont Notre-Dame (French pronunciation: [pɔ̃ nɔtʁə dam]) is a bridge that crosses the Seine in Paris, France linking the quai de Gesvres on the Rive Droite with the quai de la Corse on the Île de la Cité. The bridge is noted for being the "most ancient" in Paris, in the sense that, while the oldest bridge in Paris that is in its original state is undoubtedly the Pont Neuf, a bridge in some form has existed at the site of the Pont Notre-Dame since antiquity; nonetheless, it has been destroyed and reconstructed numerous times, a fact referred to in the Latin inscription on it to honor its Italian architect, Fra Giovanni Giocondo. (See below.) The bridge once was lined with approximately sixty houses, the weight of which caused a collapse in 1499.

== History ==
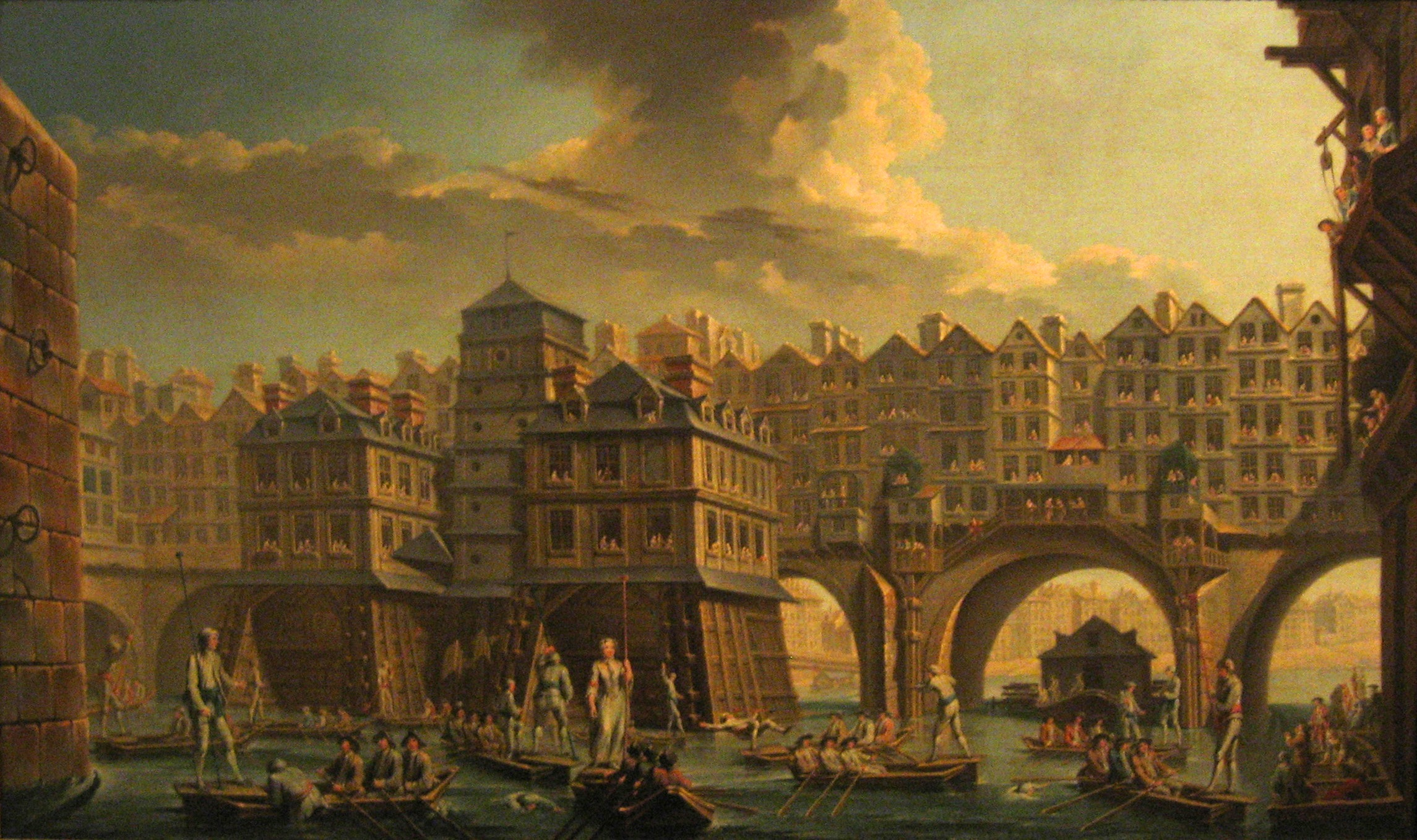
La joute de mariniers entre le pont Notre-Dame et le Pont-au-Change, by Nicolas-Jean-Baptiste Raguenet, 1756, clearly shows the houses atop the bridge.

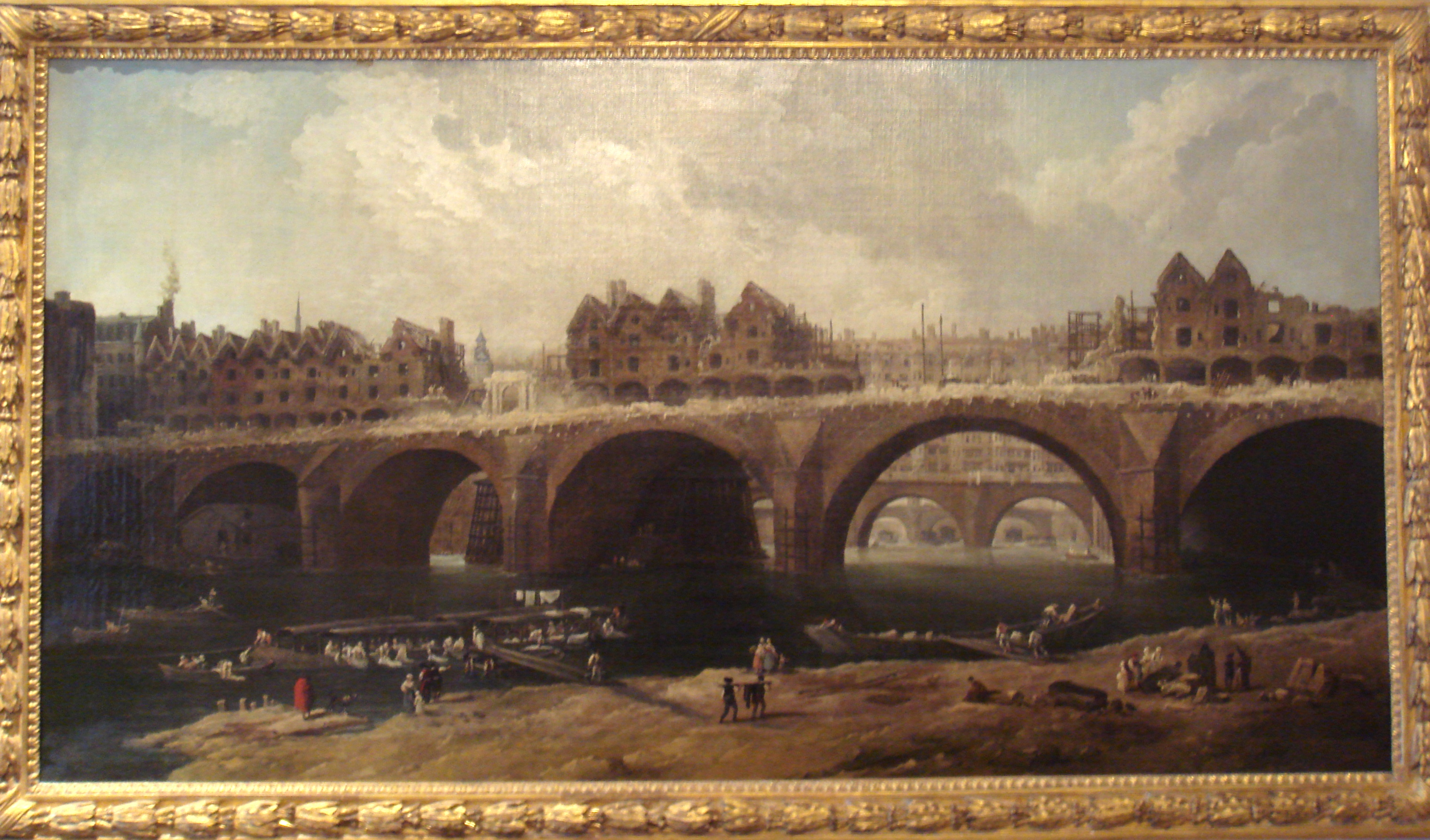
Destruction of the houses on Pont Notre-Dame in 1786, painted by Hubert Robert (1733–1808)

It was on this spot that the first bridge of Paris, called the Grand-Pont, crossed the Seine from antiquity. A bridge has existed there since at least the pre-Roman tribal era, to be rebuilt again and again, sometimes of wood, sometimes of stone. In 886, during the siege of Paris and the Norman attacks, the Roman stone structure was destroyed and replaced by a different bridge, possibly a plank bridge, named the Pont des Planches de Milbray (Milbray plank bridge), although the exact timing, placement, and existence of this particular plank bridge is contested. Two wooden bridges (at the place of the Grand Pont and Petit Pont) are said to have been burned in 1111. These bridges were replaced by Louis the Fat (Louis VI) with the two famous stone bridges as depicted in the Life of Saint Denis, which were then destroyed in the flood of 1296 and the wooden bridge which then replaced the stone Grand Pont was destroyed by the floods of 1406. On 31 May 1412 Charles VI of France ordered the construction of the first version of the bridge to be named "Notre-Dame". This structure was composed of solid wood and connected the Île de la Cité to the rue Saint-Martin. The bridge took seven years to build and had sixty houses atop it, thirty on each side. The houses were noted by Robert Gauguin as being "remarkable for their height, and the uniformity of construction" and was called the "handsomest in France." King Charles' wooden bridge collapsed on 25 October 1499 near 9 a.m., likely due to structural instabilities caused by the lack of repairs.

Stone foundations were laid for a new bridge that same year, while a ferry filled the transportation void. This time, the bridge was built with stone, as an arch bridge under the direction of Italian architect, scholar and Franciscan Friar, Fra Giovanni Giocondo, who had also overseen the building of the Petit Pont. The construction was completed in 1507, still overhung with sixty stone and brick buildings all built to one tall gabled design, and would become a spot of frequent commerce and trading: here was located the tiny boutique of the marchand-mercier Edme-François Gersaint, a leading Parisian art dealer, whose shop-sign was painted by Antoine Watteau. The houses upon the bridge were the first to be given numbers. In 1660 the bridge was refurbished to honour the arrival in Paris of the daughter of the king Philip IV of Spain, Maria Theresa of Spain who became queen of France by marrying Louis XIV. Between 1746 and 1788 the houses along the bridge were demolished for sanitary purposes and because of the danger the structures caused to the bridge's stability.

In 1853, a new stone structure was completed atop the existing stone foundation, although this reincarnation was only composed of five arches. The new bridge was subsequently the cause of not fewer than thirty-five water traffic accidents between 1891 and 1910 and was given the unofficial name the pont du Diable (Devil's Bridge). Thus, in order to facilitate the passage of boats and the flow of the Seine, a decision was made to rebuild the bridge, this time in metal. The new work was directed by Jean Résal, who had also worked on the Pont Mirabeau and Pont Alexandre III; it was inaugurated in 1919 by Raymond Poincaré, President of the French Republic. The structure has remained the same since.

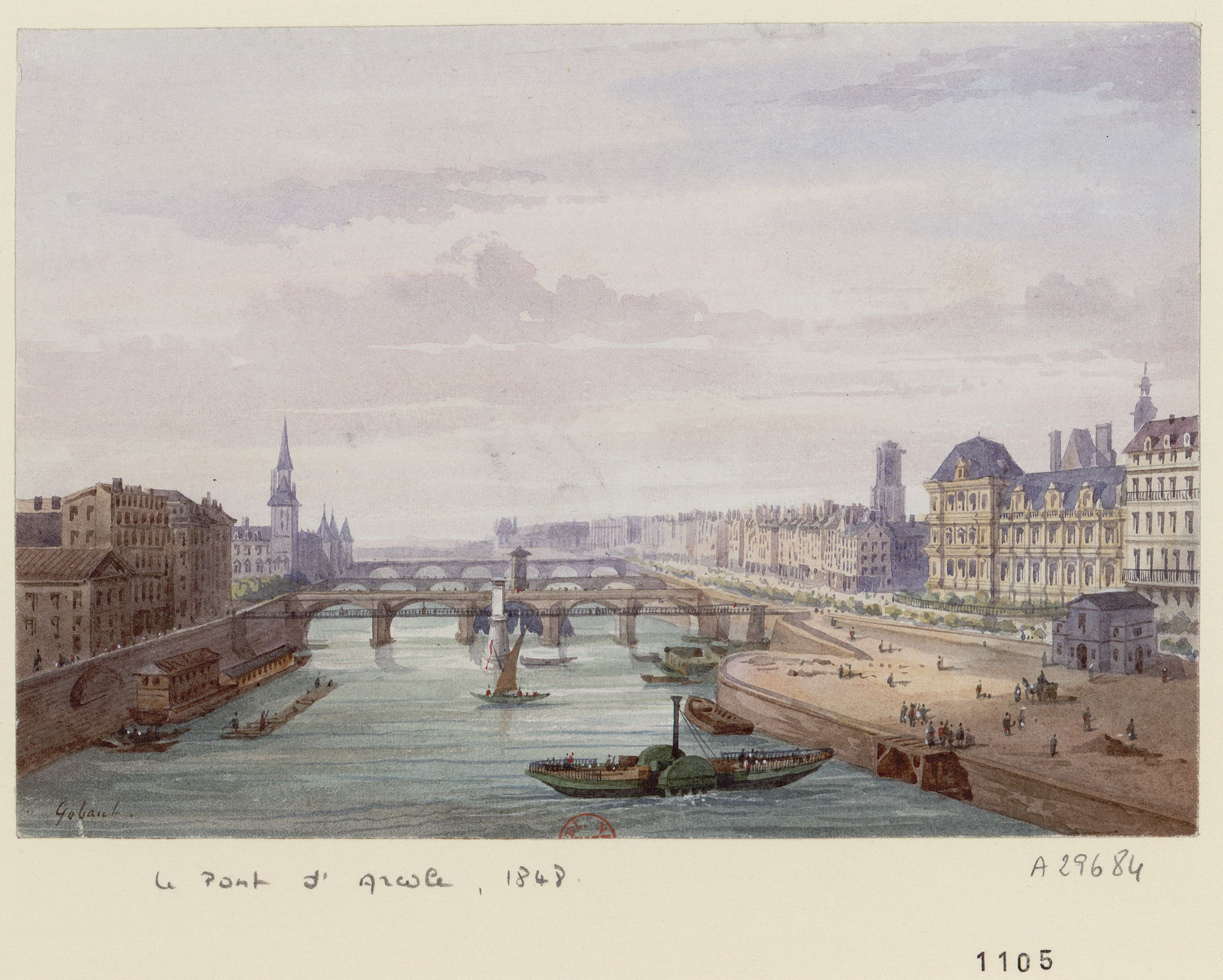
From the pont d'Arcole, a view of the bridge with 5 arches.

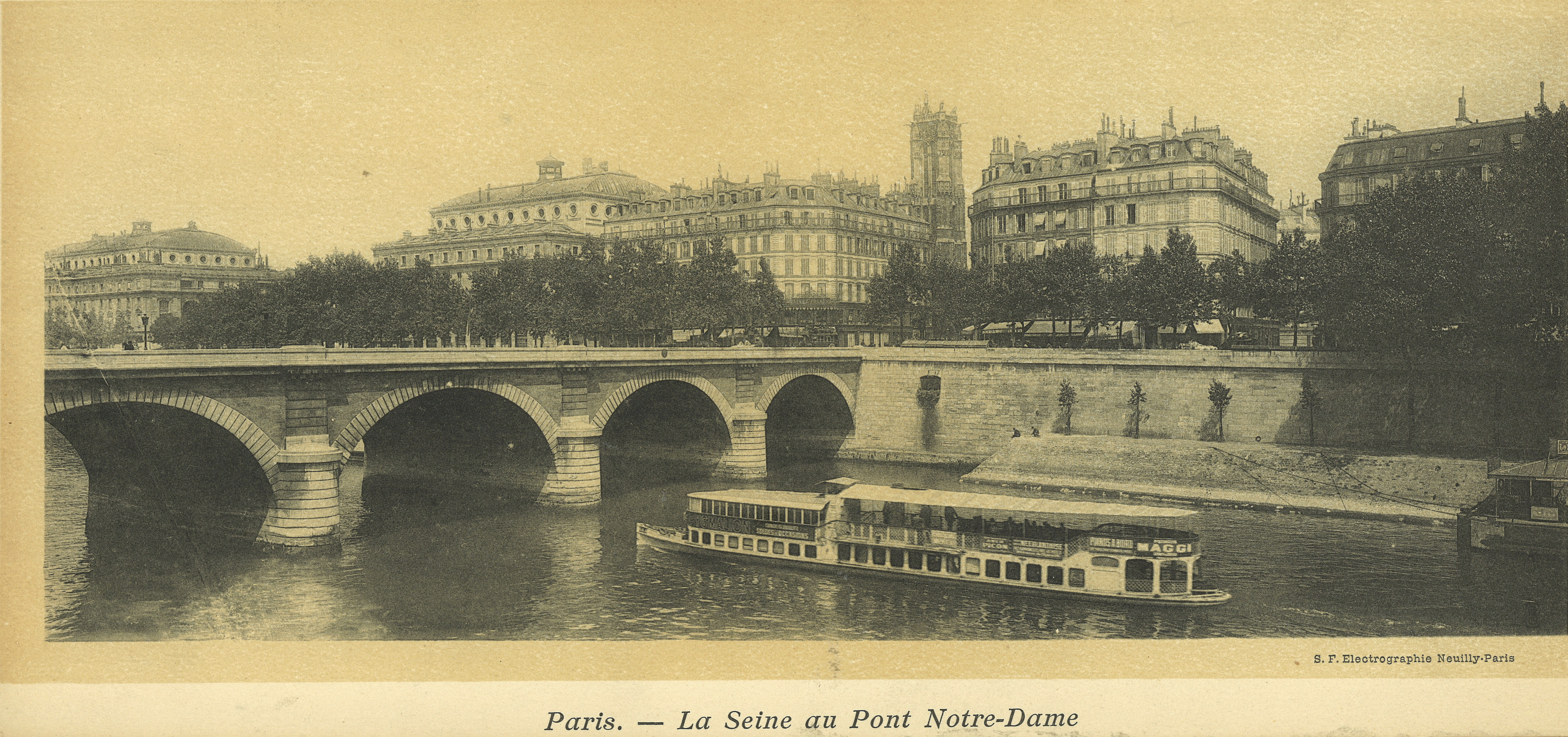
Bridge with 5 arches

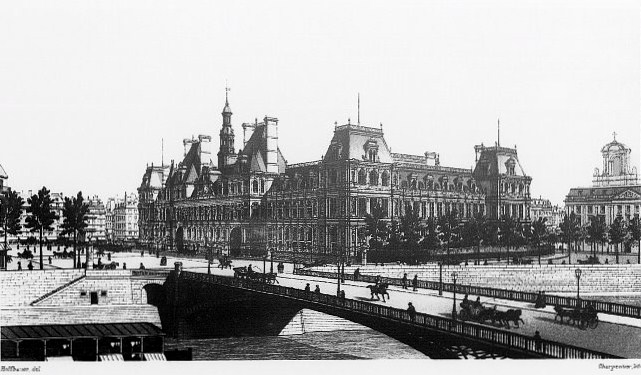
Metal bridge at the beginning of the 20th century.

== Inscription ==
Beneath one of the arches, there is a distich in Latin from Italian poet Jacopo Sannazaro, best known for his master-work Arcadia, which depicted an idyllic land. The inscription reads:

Jucundus geminum posuit tibi, Sequana, pontem:
Hunc tu jure potes dicere pontificem

— Sannazaro

This quote translates as "Joconde (Giacondo) put up this twin bridge here for you, Sequana; you are able to speak of this priest with authority" or "in this you can swear that he was the bridge-builder", punning on two possible meanings of pontifex. This refers to the architect, Fra Giovanni Giocondo, and the numerous bridges that had been built earlier upon that spot.

== Art ==
- Each of the bridge's arches carries a head of Dionysus carved in stone. Additionally, its piles are decorated on each side with a ram's head. In the niches along the arches there are statues of Saint Louis, Henri IV, Louis XIII, and Louis XIV.
- In 1756, during the bridge's commercial peak, Nicolas-Jean-Baptiste Raguenet painted La joute de mariniers entre le pont Notre-Dame et le Pont-au-Change (Jousting of the mariners between the Pont Notre-Dame and the Pont-au-Change), which shows the buildings built atop the bridge.
- In 1856, colour-blind artist Charles Meryon etched "L'Arche du pont Notre-Dame" (The arch of Pont Notre-Dame).

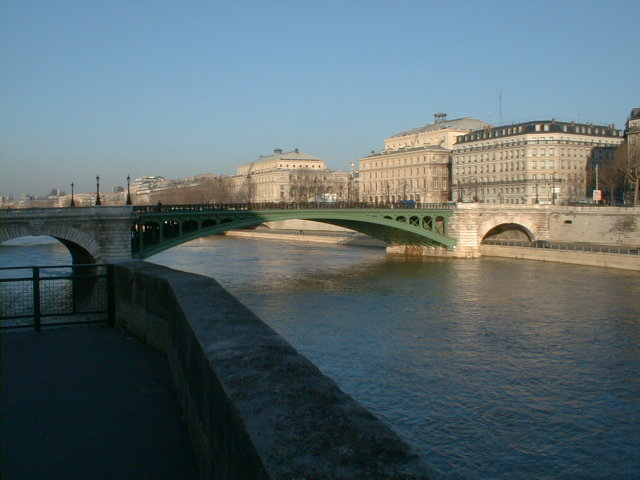
Pont Notre-Dame

== Access ==
Location on the Seine

Located near the Métro station: Pont Marie.

The Pont Notre-Dame is centrally located in Paris' 4th arrondissement, connecting the Île de la Cité, one of the two natural islands on the Seine within the city limits, to the Rive Droite (French: Right Bank).
