= Pont Neuf =

Bridge across the Seine in Paris, France

Le Pont Neuf
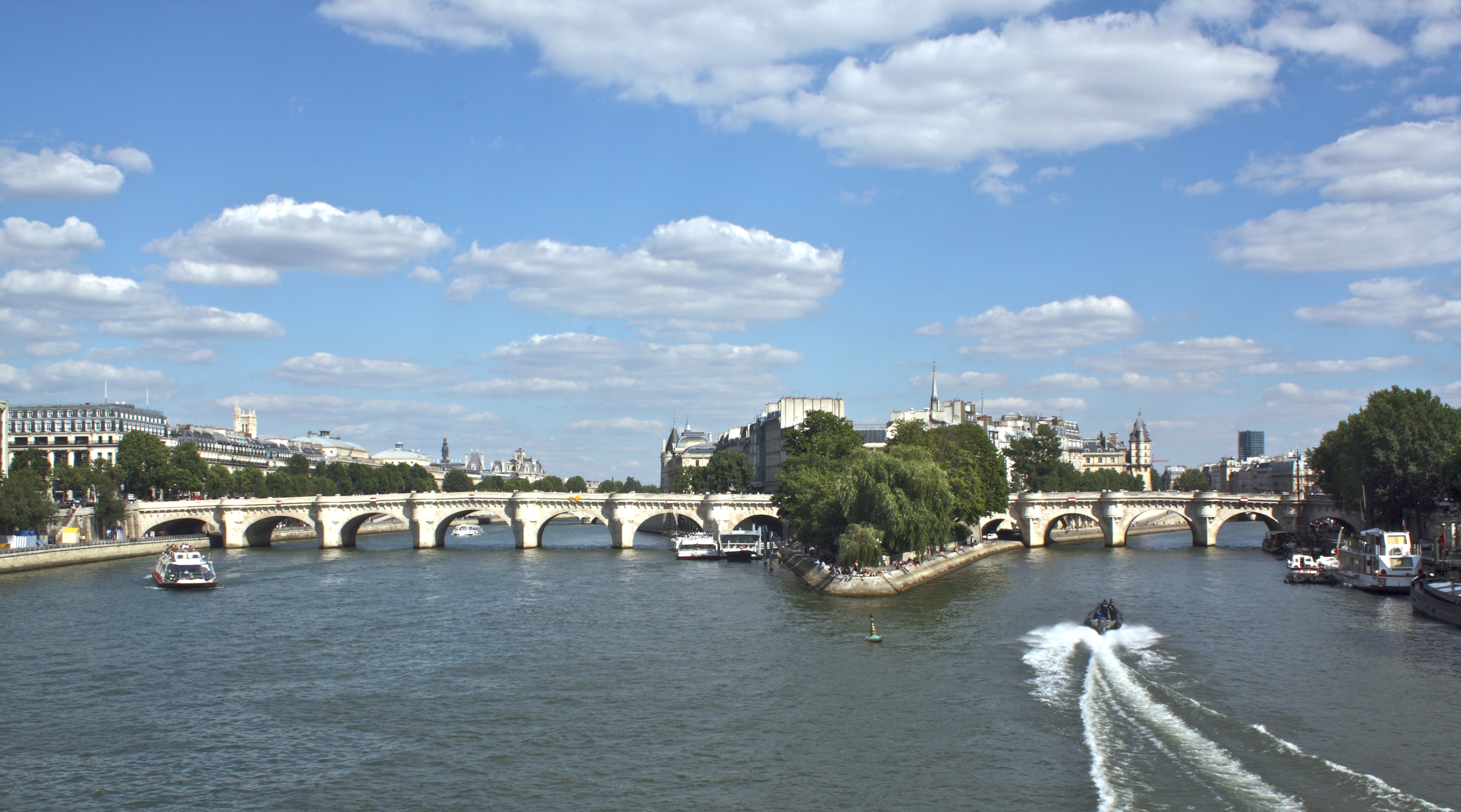
- The bridge as seen from the Pont des Arts
- Coordinates: 48°51′27″N 2°20′30″E
- Crosses: River Seine
- Locale: Paris, France
- Next upstream: Pont au Change; Pont Saint-Michel
- Next downstream: Pont des Arts

Characteristics
- Design: Arch bridge
- Material: Stone
- Total length: 232 metres (761 ft)
- Width: 22 metres (72 ft)
- No. of spans: 7 + 5

History
- Designer: Believed to be Baptiste Androuet du Cerceau and Guillaume Marchand maintenance engineering by Soufflot, Perronet, Lagalisserie and Résal
- Construction start: 1578
- Construction end: 1607

Location
- Interactive map of Le Pont Neuf

The Pont Neuf (French pronunciation: [pɔ̃ nœf], "New Bridge") is the oldest standing bridge across the river Seine in Paris, France. It stands by the western (downstream) point of the Île de la Cité, the island in the middle of the river that between 250 and 225 BC was the birthplace of Paris (then known as Lutetia). During the medieval period, the Île was the heart of the city.

The bridge is composed of two separate spans, one of five arches joining the left bank to the Île de la Cité, another of seven joining the island to the right bank. Old engraved maps of Paris show that the newly built bridge just grazed the downstream tip of the Île de la Cité; since then, the natural sandbar building of a mid-river island, aided by stone-faced embankments called quais, has extended the island. Today the tip of the island is the location of the Square du Vert-Galant, a small public park named in honour of Henry IV, nicknamed the "Green Gallant".

The name Pont Neuf was given to distinguish it from older bridges that were lined on both sides with houses, and has remained after all of those were replaced. Its name notwithstanding, it has long been the oldest bridge in Paris crossing the Seine. It has been listed since 1889 as a monument historique by the French Ministry of Culture.

== Construction ==
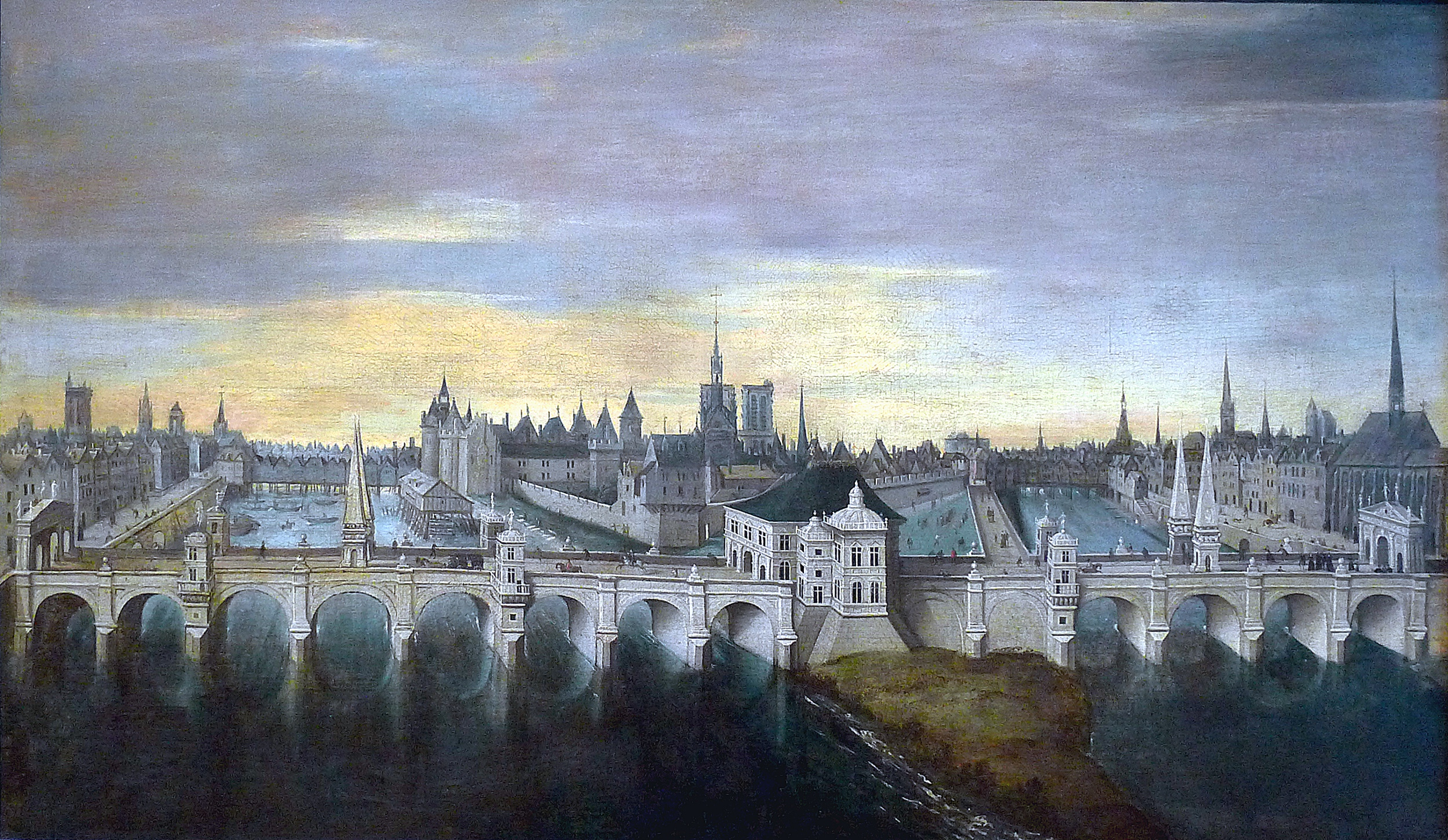
Painting of the Pont Neuf project as approved by King Henry III in 1578. The bridge was completed in 1607 with a less ornate design.

As early as 1550, Henry II considered building a new bridge at the Ile de la Cité because the existing Pont Notre-Dame was congested and needed repair. The idea was not advanced for lack of funds. By 1577, Henry III released funds from the national treasury for a new bridge and appointed a building commission for its designing and planning. Henry rejected the first design proposed by the committee, which included monumental arches, but no plan for buildings along the sides. The commission proceeded in 1578 with modifications to its initial plan, perhaps devised by the royal architect, Androuet de Cerceau. While Henry had already allowed for piers to be driven for the northern arm of bridge, the first construction under the 1579 design indicated a wider deck in preparation of buildings to be constructed on the side. The houses were never built, but the wide bridge deck was retained.

In February 1578, the decision to build the bridge was made by Henry III who laid its first stone in on 31 May 1578, the same year when the foundations of four piers and one abutment were completed. Pierre des Isles, one of the builders, convinced the supervisory commission that the bridge, which was originally planned straight, would be more resistant to the river currents if its two sections were built at a slight angle. The change was adopted in May 1578.

Further design changes were made during the summer of 1579. First, the number of arches was changed from eight and four to seven and five. This was not a problem on the north side, where nothing had been built, but on the south, where the four piles and the abutment on the Left Bank were already laid, the addition of the fifth arch necessitated reducing the length of the platform on the island, the terre-plein, from 28.5 toises to about 19. Second, it was decided to allow houses to be built on the bridge (though they never were). This required the widening of the bridge. The remaining piers were built over the next nine years. After a long delay beginning in 1588, due to political unrest and to the Wars of Religion, construction was resumed in 1599 under the reign of Henry IV. The bridge was opened to traffic in 1604 and completed in July 1606. It was inaugurated by Henry IV in 1607.

Like most bridges of its time, the Pont Neuf is constructed as a series of many short arch bridges, following Roman precedents. It was the first stone bridge in Paris not to support houses in addition to a thoroughfare, and was also fitted with pavements protecting pedestrians from mud and horses; pedestrians could also step aside into its bastions to let a bulky carriage pass. The decision not to include houses on the bridge can be traced back directly to Henry IV, who decided against their inclusion on the grounds that houses would impede a clear view of the Louvre, which the newly built galerie du bord de l'eau linked to the Tuileries Palace.

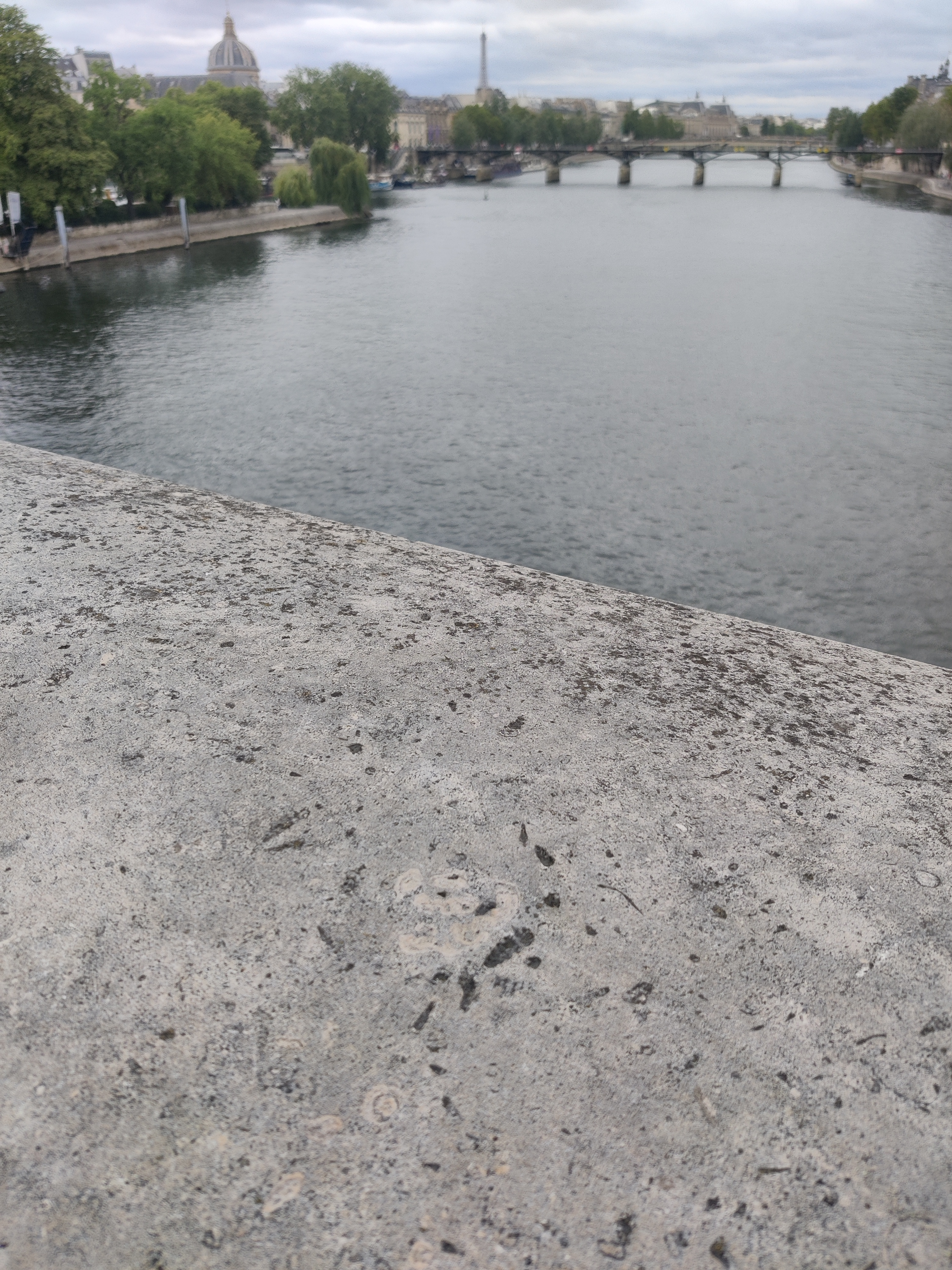
The bridge's stonework includes many small fossils

Pont Neuf was for a long time the widest bridge in Paris. It has undergone much repair and renovation work, including rebuilding of seven spans in the long arm and lowering of the roadway by changing the arches from an almost semi-circular to elliptical form (1848–1855), lowering of sidewalks and faces of the piers, spandrels, cornices and replacing crumbled corbels as closely to the originals as possible. In 1885, one of the piers of the short arm was undermined, removing the two adjacent arches, requiring them to be rebuilt and all the foundations strengthened.

A major restoration of the Pont Neuf was begun in 1994 and completed in 2007, the year of its 400th anniversary.

== Mascarons ==
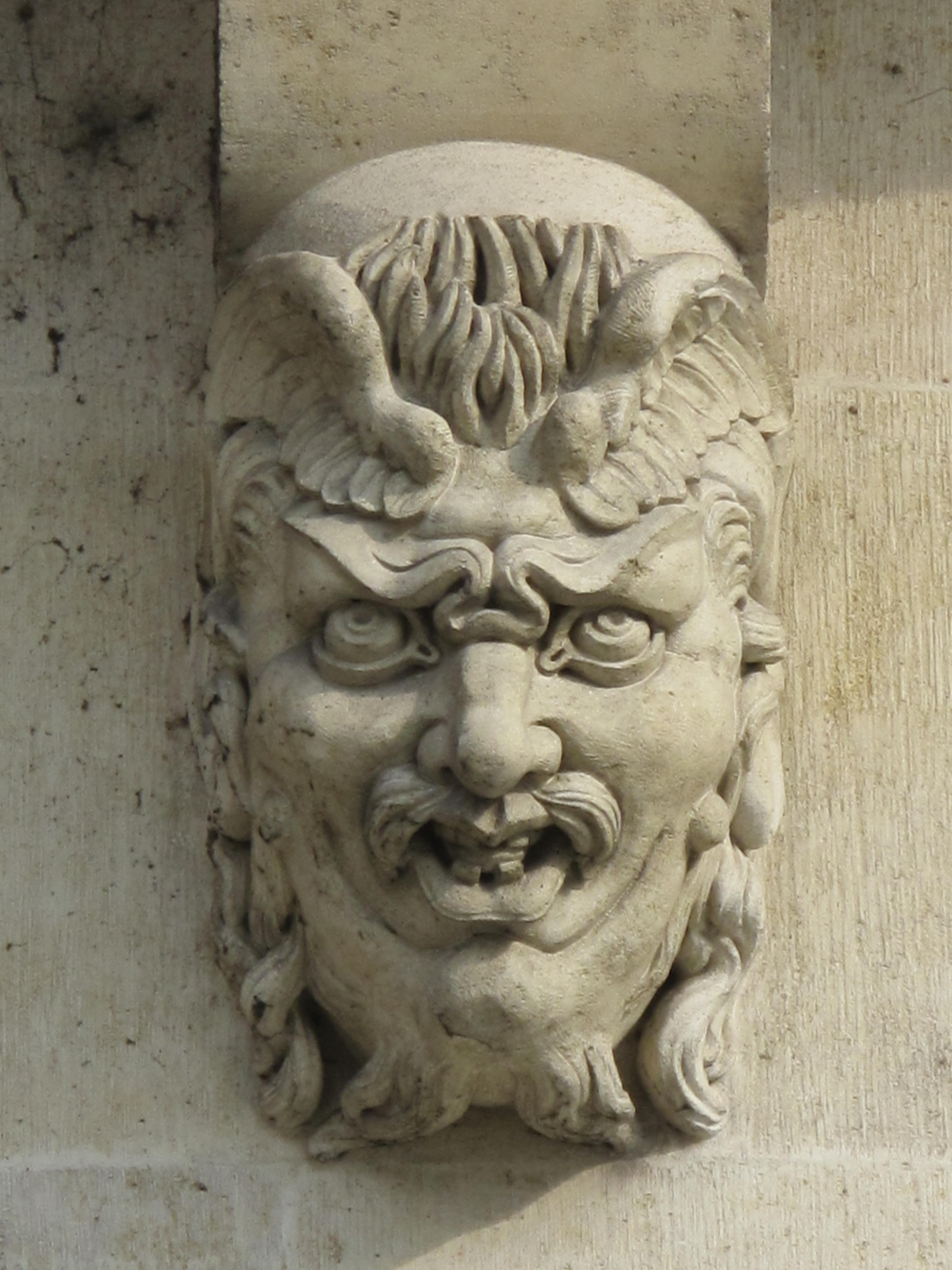
The mascarons, 381 in number, are copies of the Renaissance originals

The mascarons are 381 stone masks, each different from the others, which decorate the sides of the bridge. They represent the heads of forest and field divinities from ancient mythology, as well as satyrs and sylvains. They are copies of the originals attributed to the French Renaissance sculptor Germain Pilon (1525–1590), who also sculpted the tomb of King Henry II of France and Queen Catherine de'Medici in the Basilica of St Denis, five kilometers north of Paris. The mascarons remained in place until 1851–1854, when the bridge was completely rebuilt. At that time six of the original mascarons from the 16th century were placed in the Musée Carnavalet, along with eight molds of other originals. Eight other originals were first placed in the Musée de Cluny – Musée national du Moyen Âge, and are now in the French National Museum of the Renaissance in the Château d'Écouen. During their reconstruction, the Renaissance masks were replaced with copies made by noted 19th-century sculptors, including Hippolyte Maindron, Hubert Lavigne, Antoine-Louis Barye and Fontenelle. Fontenelle made 61 masks, which are found on the upstream side of the bridge between the right bank and the Île de la Cité.

== Equestrian statue of Henry IV ==
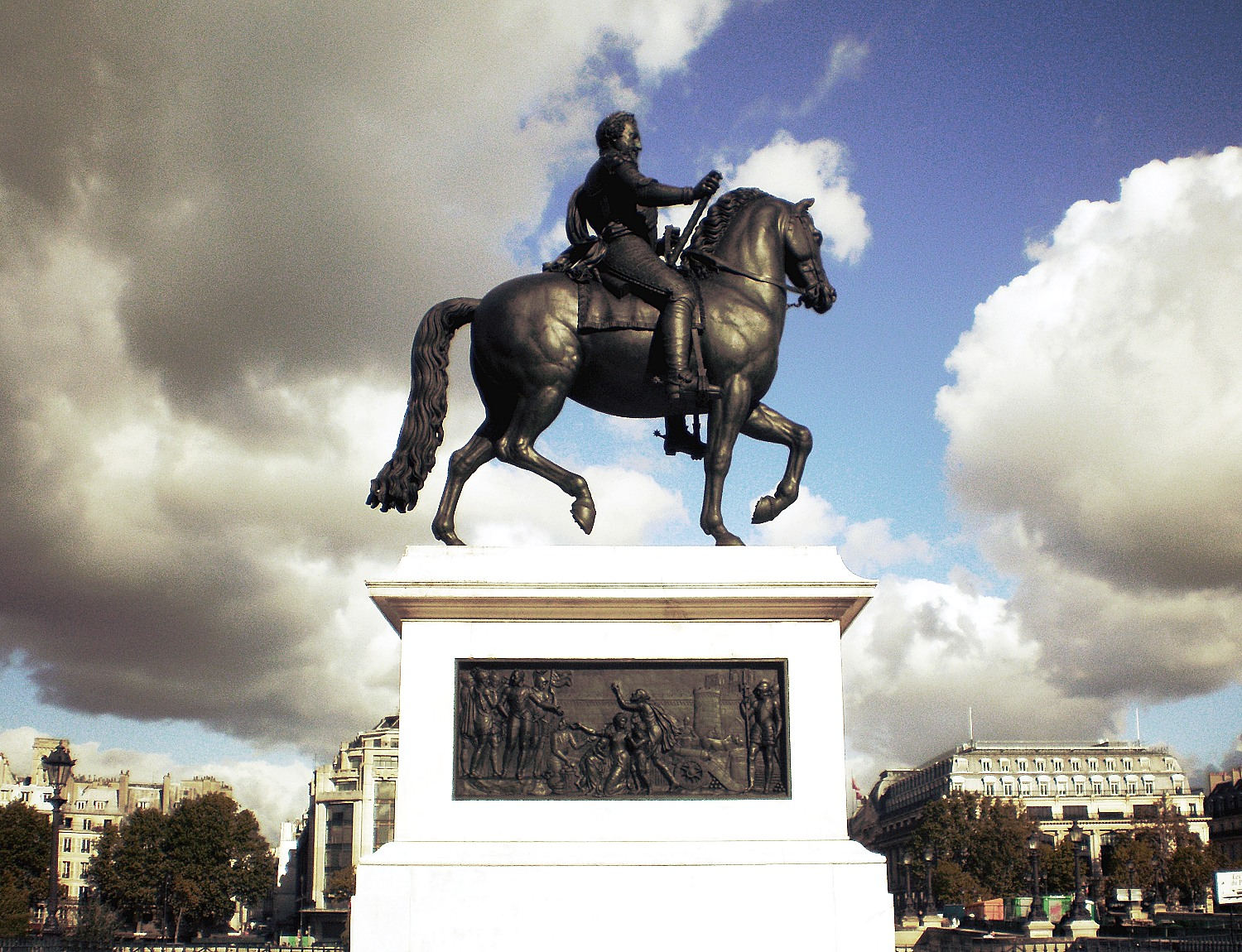
Statue of Henry IV on the Pont Neuf (1618, destroyed 1792, replaced 1818)

At the point where the bridge crosses the Île de la Cité, there stands a bronze equestrian statue of King Henry IV, originally commissioned from Giambologna under the orders of Marie de Médicis, Henry's widow and Regent of France. After his death, Giambologna's assistant Pietro Tacca completed the statue, which was erected on its pedestal by Pietro Francavilla, in 1614. It was destroyed in 1792 during the French Revolution, but was rebuilt in 1818, following the restoration of the Bourbon monarchy. Commissioned from public donations, bronze for the new statue was obtained from a statue of Louis Charles Antoine Desaix and melted down. The new statue was cast from a mold made using a surviving cast of the original. Inside the statue, the new sculptor François-Frédéric Lemot put four boxes, containing a history of the life of Henry IV, a 17th-century parchment certifying the original statue, a document describing how the new statue was commissioned, and a list of people who contributed to a public subscription.

== La Samaritaine ==
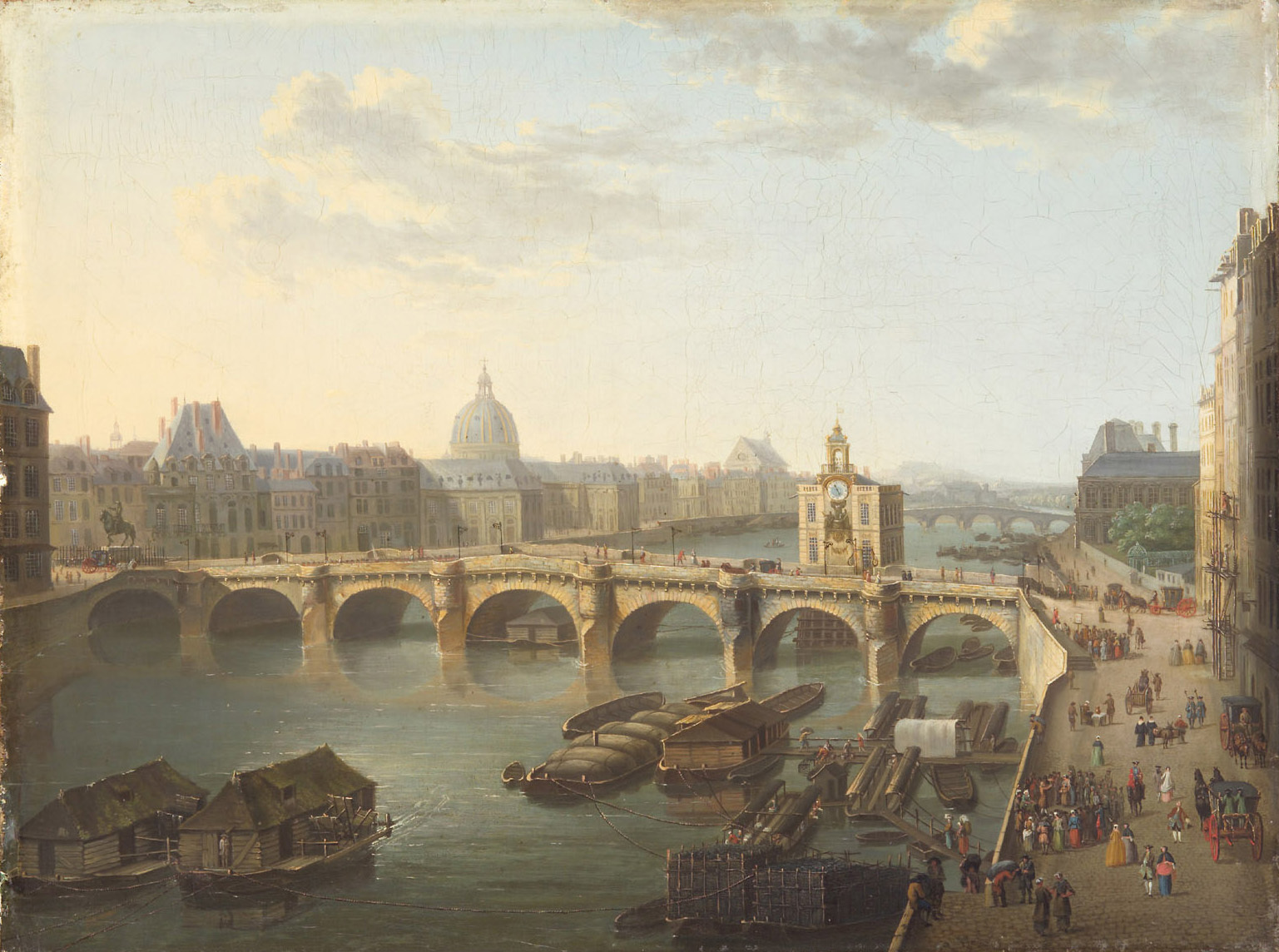
View of the Samaritaine pumphouse on the Pont Neuf in 1743

Between 1712 and 1719, replacing an earlier one, a large pump house was built on the bridge. It was decorated with an image of the Samaritan woman at the well. As a result, the structure (which included a carillon) was named La Samaritaine. Years after it was torn down (in 1813), Ernest Cognacq, a 19th-century merchant, set up a stand on the site and gradually grew his business to what became, in 1869, the department store La Samaritaine.

== As the centre of Paris ==
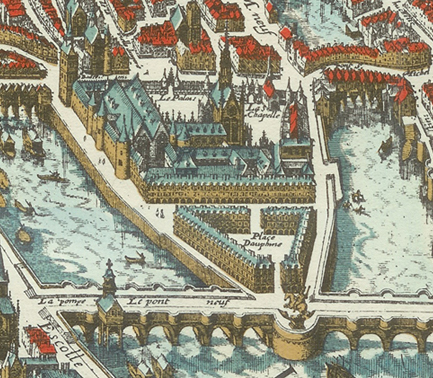
The Pont Neuf in 1615, (Map of Paris by Matthäus Merian)

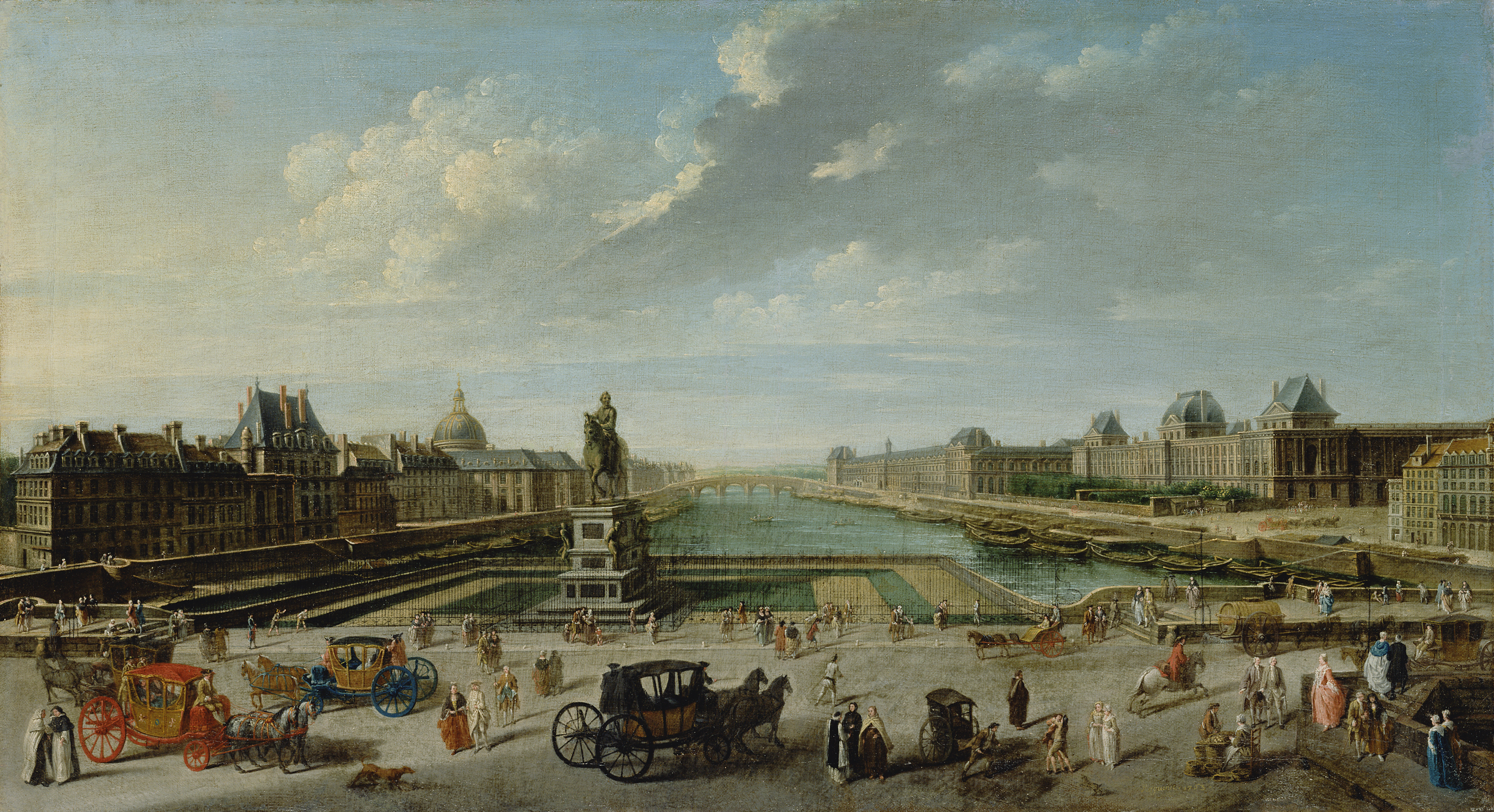
The Pont Neuf in 1763, by Nicolas-Jean-Baptiste Raguenet

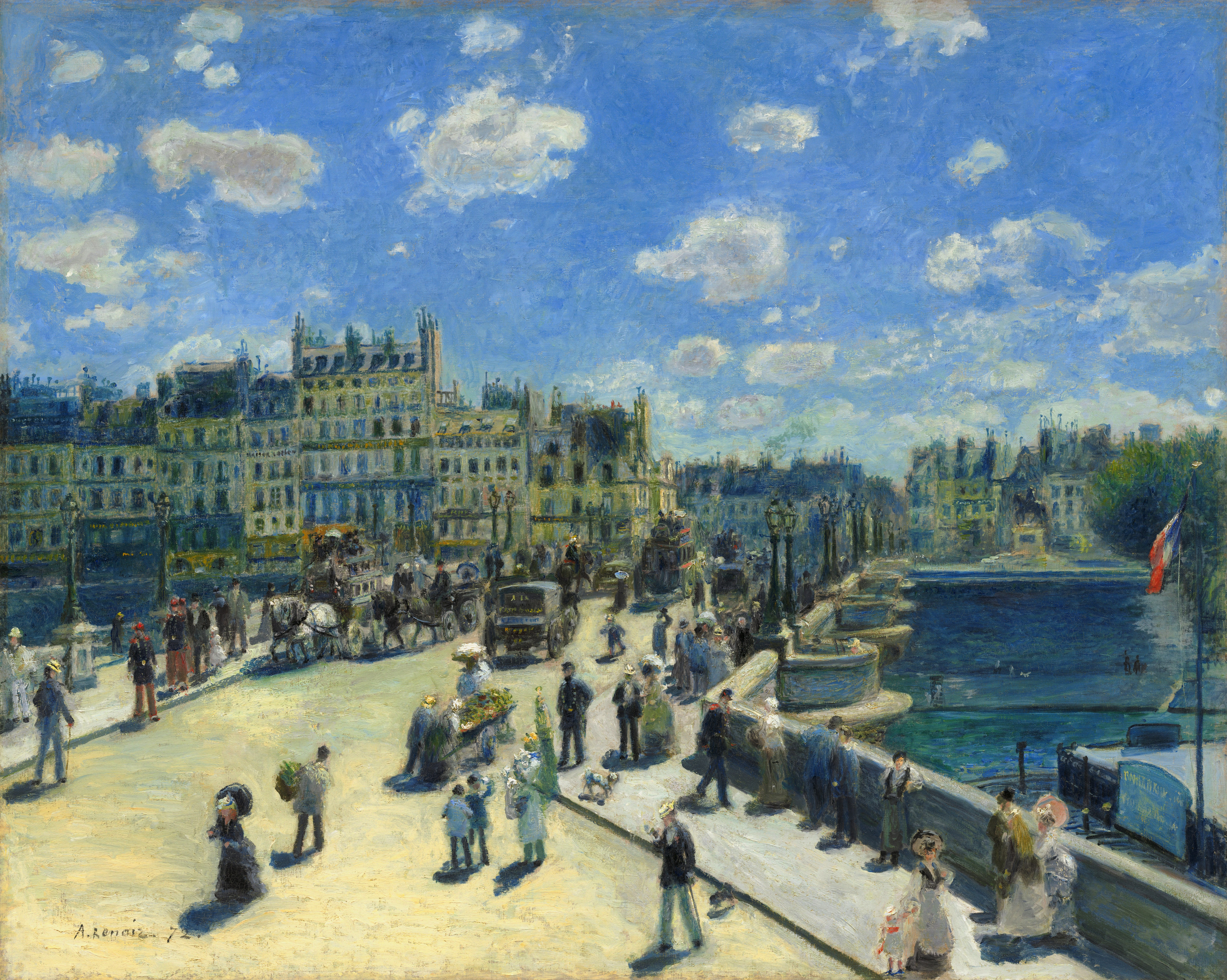
Le Pont-Neuf, Pierre-Auguste Renoir's 1872 painting of Parisians crossing the bridge

Upon completion, Pont Neuf attracted throngs of visitors, many of whom used the bridge as a public square, conducting business, socializing, and taking in the view. One contemporary writer repeated a proverb about Pont Neuf to illustrate the variety of people who frequented the bridge, "one never crossed the Pont Neuf without meeting three things: a monk, a girl and a white horse."

All through the 18th century, the Pont Neuf was the center of Paris, lively with both crime and commerce:

Czar Peter the Great, who came to study French civilization under the regency of the Duke d'Orleans, declared that he had found nothing more curious in Paris than the Pont Neuf; and, sixty years later, the philosopher Franklin wrote to his friends in America that he had not understood the Parisian character except in crossing the Pont Neuf.

In 1862, Édouard Fournier traced its history in his lively two-volume Histoire du Pont-Neuf. He describes how, even before it was completed (in 1607), gangs hid out in and around it, robbing and murdering people. It remained a dangerous place even as it became busier. For a long time, the bridge even had its own gallows.

This did not prevent people from congregating there, drawn by various stands and street performers (acrobats, fire-eaters, musicians, etc.). Charlatans and quacks of various sorts were also common, as well as the hustlers (shell game hucksters, etc.) and pickpockets often found in crowds – not to mention a lively trade in prostitution. Among the many businesses which, however, unofficially set up there, were several famous tooth pullers.

In 1701, Cotolendi quoted a letter supposedly written by a Sicilian tourist:

One finds on the Pont-Neuf an infinity of people who give tickets, some put fallen teeth back in, and others make crystal eyes; there are those who cure incurable illnesses; those who claim to have discovered the virtues of some powdered stones to white and to beautify the face. This one claims he makes old men young; there are those who remove wrinkles from the forehead and the eyes, who make wooden legs to repair the violence of bombs; finally everybody is so applied to work, so strongly and continually, that the devil can tempt no one but on Holidays and Sundays.

With its numerous sellers of pamphlets and satirical performers, it was also a center for social commentary:

In the 16th cent. the Pont-Neuf was the scene of the recitals of Tabarin, a famous satirist of the day, and it was long afterwards the favourite rendezvous of news-vendors, jugglers, showmen, loungers, and thieves. Any popular witticism in verse was long known as un Pont-Neuf.

In the seventeenth century, that bridge of memories, the old Pont Neuf of Paris, was the rendezvous of quacksalvers and mountebanks. Booths for the sale of various articles lined the sides of the bridge. People flocked there to see the sights, laugh, chat, make love and enjoy life as only Parisians can. Students and grisettes of the Quartier latin elbowed ladies and gentlemen of the court. Bourgeois families came to study the flippant manners of the aristocrats. Poodle clippers plied their trade; jugglers amused the quid nuncs with feats of dexterity; traveling dentists pulled teeth and sold balsams; clowns tumbled; and last, but not least, pickpockets lifted purses and silk handkerchiefs with impunity. Says Augustus J. C. Hare (Walks in Paris): "So central an artery is the Pont Neuf, that it used to be a saying with the Parisian police, that if, after watching three days, they did not see a man cross the bridge, he must have left Paris." One of the principal vendors of quack nostrums of the Pont Neuf was Montdor. He was aided by a buffoon named Tabarin, who made facetious replies to questions asked by his master, accompanied with laughable grimaces and grotesque gestures. The modern ringmaster and clown of the circus have similar scenes together, minus the selling of medicines.

The Pont Neuf with the Eiffel Tower and the Institut de France in the background. A bateau-mouche sails on the Seine

Under Louis XV, thieves and entertainers were joined by recruiters, or "sellers of human flesh", who did their best to lure newcomers to Paris and others "with as much violence as the sale of Negros in the Congo". Silversmiths and other luxury businesses nearby (which gave their name to the Quai des Orfèvres) drew visitors as well.

One yearly event, held on the nearby Place Dauphine, prefigured the Salon des Refusés which would give rise to the Impressionists. During the celebration of the Corpus Christi (Fête-Dieu), the Place Dauphine hosted one of the most magnificent reposoirs (portable altars for the Host).

Along with all the rich silverwork and tapestries placed on it, some local silversmiths ordered paintings for these. This led to art dealers being asked to participate and, ultimately, to the newest talents being shown at the Petite Fête-Dieu (the Small Corpus Christi), a reduced version of the Corpus Christi holiday which took place eight days later. Though their canvases were only shown from six in the morning to noon, this became an important opportunity for unknown artists to draw attention. Among other things, this led to the painters there signing their work, as was not frequent in the Salon – which was not always an advantage when the work was publicly and loudly critiqued.

Showing works, which often had no pretense of a religious subject, they might then be noticed and find an entree into the official Academy. Chardin is one of the most famous painters to have started this way.

In 1720, a young man of about twenty-two, son of the man who maintained the king's billiards, displayed a canvas here showing an antique bas-relief. J.-B. Vanloo passed by, looked at the canvas for a long time, found great qualities there, and bought it. He wanted afterwards to know the young painter, encouraged him, gave him advice, of which the latter perhaps had no need, got him work, which was more useful, and eight years later, the unknown of the place Dauphine was his colleague at the Academy of Painting.... he was called Jean-Baptiste-Siméon Chardin.

The slow decline of the bridge's central role began in 1754: "Starting in 1754, the first year of the vogue, the madness of the boulevards, it was no longer the thing to talk about the Cours [the Champs-Elysées], and still less of this poor Pont-Neuf. To the Boulevard, at once, long live the Boulevard!". Still the bridge remained a lively place through the end of the century. With time, people became wary of its reputation and other changes subdued its atmosphere. In 1840, Lacroix wrote: "Once the pont Neuf was a perpetual fair; at present, it is just a bridge to be crossed without stopping."

== Possible first photograph of human being ==
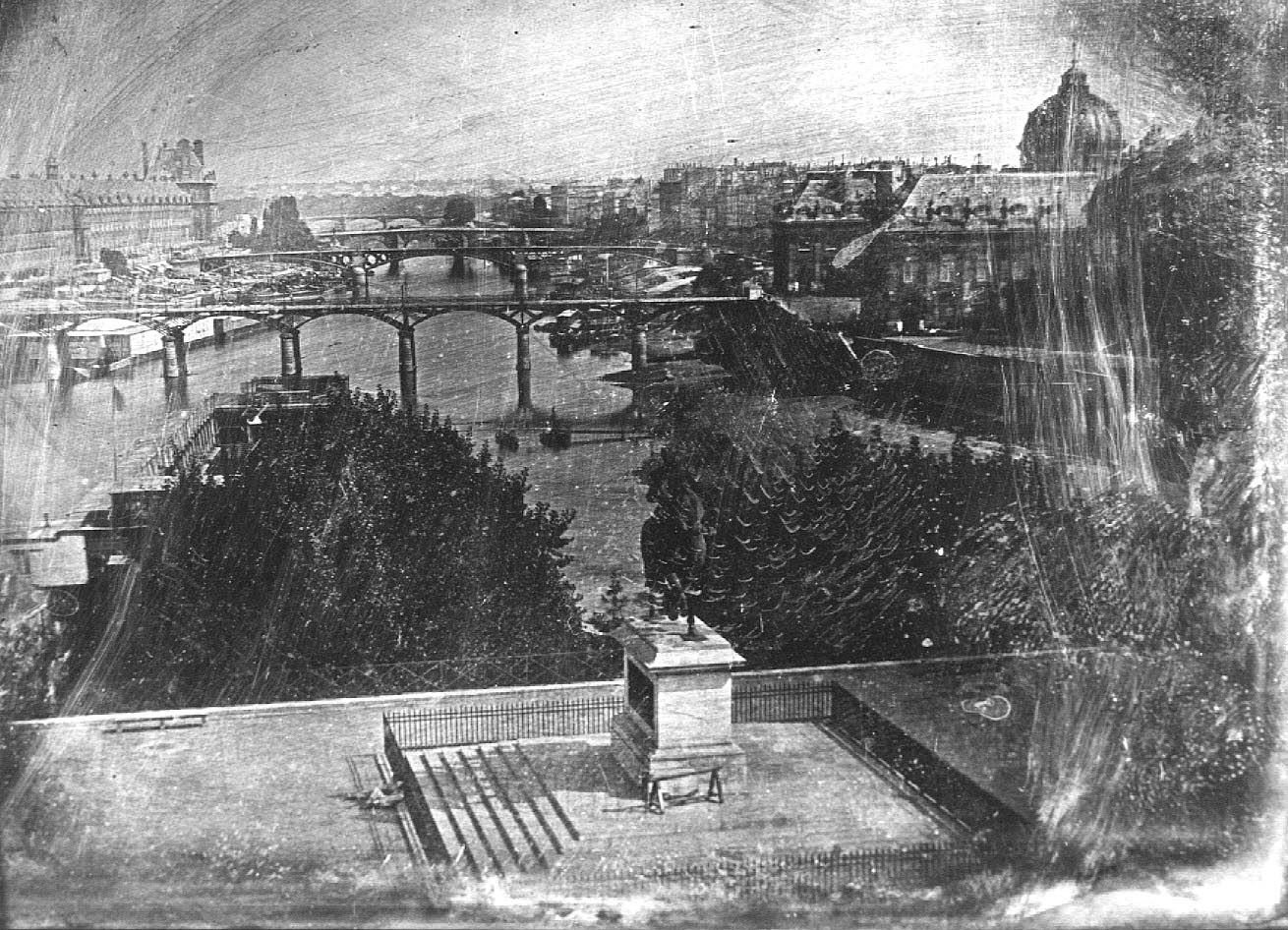
Pont Neuf photographed by Louis Daguerre, 1836-39. Like most daguerreotypes, the image is mirrored. Two people can be seen lying in the shade.

In 1838, Louis Daguerre produced his famous daguerreotype portrait of the View of the Boulevard du Temple, widely considered the first photograph where a human can be seen. However, between 1836 and 1837, Daguerre made several tests, in order to experiment with and perfect the new technique in an outdoor environment.

One surviving example is an image of the Pont Neuf and the equestrian statue of Henry IV, made possibly as early as 1836. On the lower-left side of the image, what appears to be a worker, or perhaps two, can be seen lying against the fence, in the shadow of the statue.

== Christo's project ==
In 1985, after years of negotiation with the mayor of Paris, the art duo Christo and Jeanne-Claude wrapped the Pont Neuf.

== Access ==
Location on the Seine

Located near the Metro station: Pont Neuf.

== See also ==
- Les Amants du Pont-Neuf (The Lovers on the Bridge), a film by Leos Carax, released in 1991
- List of crossings of the River Seine
- List of bridges in France

== Bibliography ==
- Baedeker, Karl (1900). Paris and Environs: With Routes from London to Paris and from Paris. Leipzig: Karl Baedeker.
- Ballon, Hilary (1991). The Paris of Henri IV: Architecture and Urbanism. Cambridge, Massachusetts: The MIT Press. ISBN 978-0262023092.
- Cotolendi, Charles (1701). Saint-Evremoniana: Ou Receuil de Diverses Piéces Curieuses (in French). Amsterdam: Pierre Mortier.
- DeJean, Joan (2014). How Paris Became Paris: The Invention of the Modern City. New York: Bloomsbury. ISBN 978-1608195916..
- Evans, Henry Ridgely (1909). The Old and the New Magic. Chicago: The Open Court Publishing Co.
- Fournier, Édouard (1862). Dentu, E. (ed.). Histoire du Pont-Neuf (in French). Paris: Libraire de la Société des Gens de Lettres.
- Lacroix, Paul (1858). Curiosités de l'Histoire du Vieux Paris (in French). Paris: Adolphe Delahays.
- Mémoires de la Société de l'Histoire de Paris et de l'Ile de France (in French). Vol. 9. Paris: Libraire de la Société de l’Histoire de Paris. 1883.
- Metman, Yves, ed. (1987). Le Registre ou plumitif de la construction du Pont Neuf: archives nationales Z1f 1065 (in French). Paris: Service des travaux historiques de la Ville de Paris. OCLC 21504748.
- Strohmayer, Ulf (2007). "Engineering Vision: the Pont-Neuf in Paris and Modernity". In Cowan, A.; Steward, J. (eds.). The City and the Senses: Urban Culture since 1500. Basingstoke: Ashgate. pp. 75–92. ISBN 978-0754684237..
- Thompson, Victoria E. (2012). "The Creation, Destruction and Recreation of Henri IV: Seeing Popular Sovereignty in the Statue of a King". History and Memory. 24 (2): 5–40.
- Whitney, Charles S. (2003). Bridges of the World: Their Design and Construction (Reprint ed.). Mineola, New York: Dover Publications. ISBN 978-0486429953.
