= Pont d'Arcole =

Bridge in Paris, France

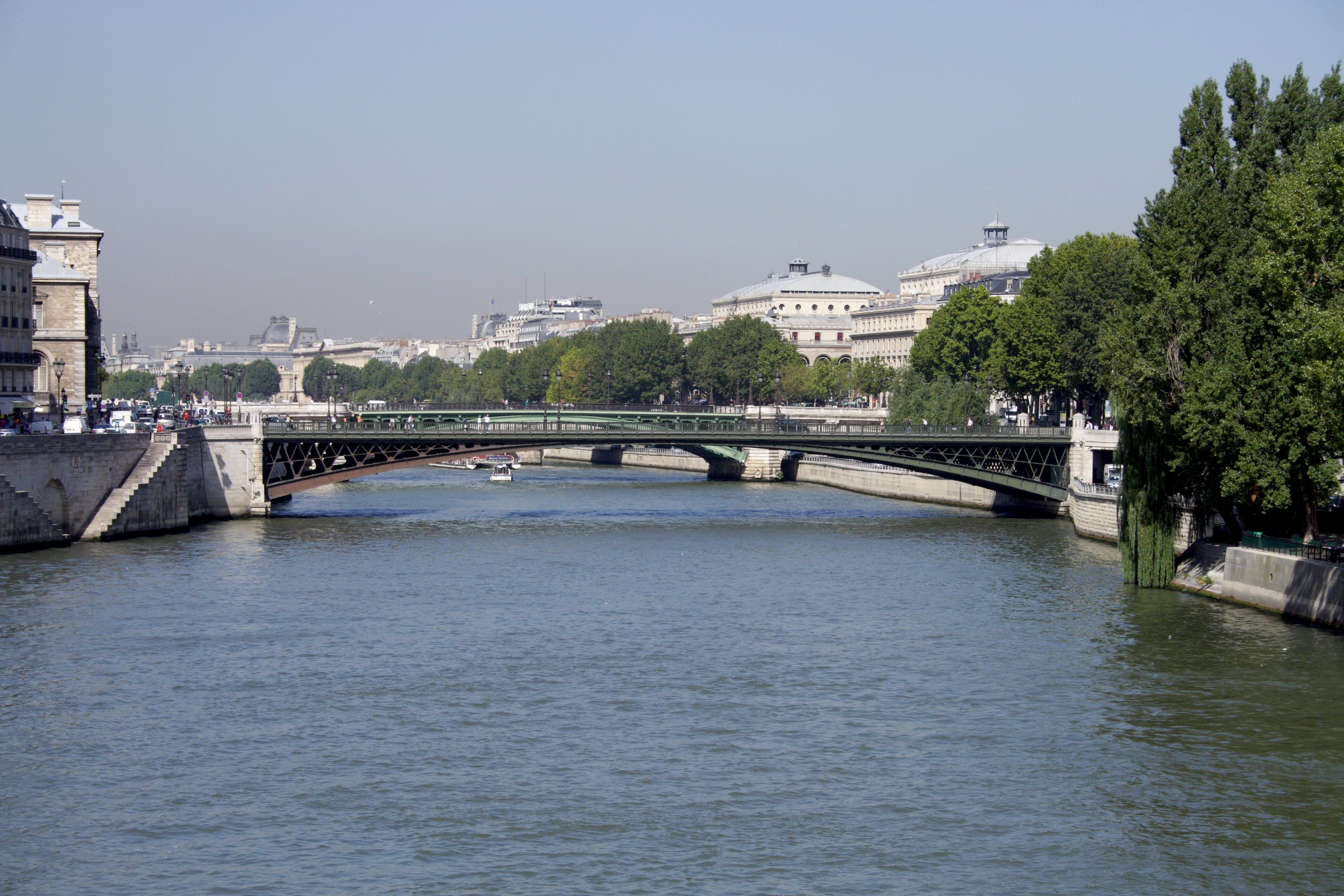
- The Pont d'Arcole
- Coordinates: 48°51′19.63″N 02°21′01.98″E
- Crosses: River Seine
- Locale: Paris, France
- Next upstream: Pont Louis-Philippe; Pont Saint-Louis
- Next downstream: Pont Notre-Dame

Characteristics
- Design: Alphonse Oudry; Nicolas Cadiat
- Total length: 80 m
- Height: 20 m

History
- Construction start: 1854
- Construction end: 1856
- Opened: 1856

The Pont d'Arcole (French pronunciation: [pɔ̃ daʁkɔl]) is a bridge in Paris over the River Seine. It is served by the Metro station Hôtel de Ville.

== History ==
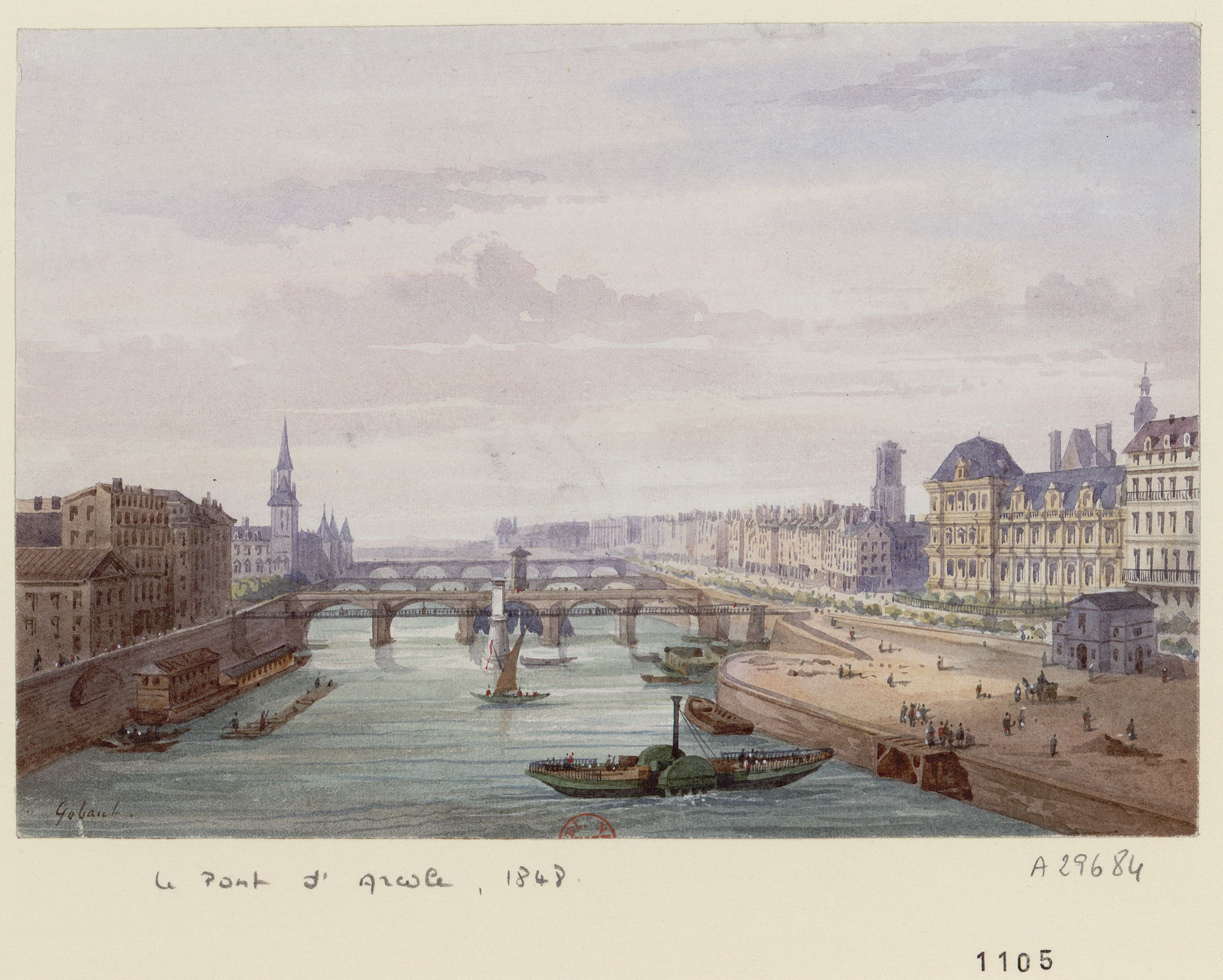
The 1848 suspension bridge

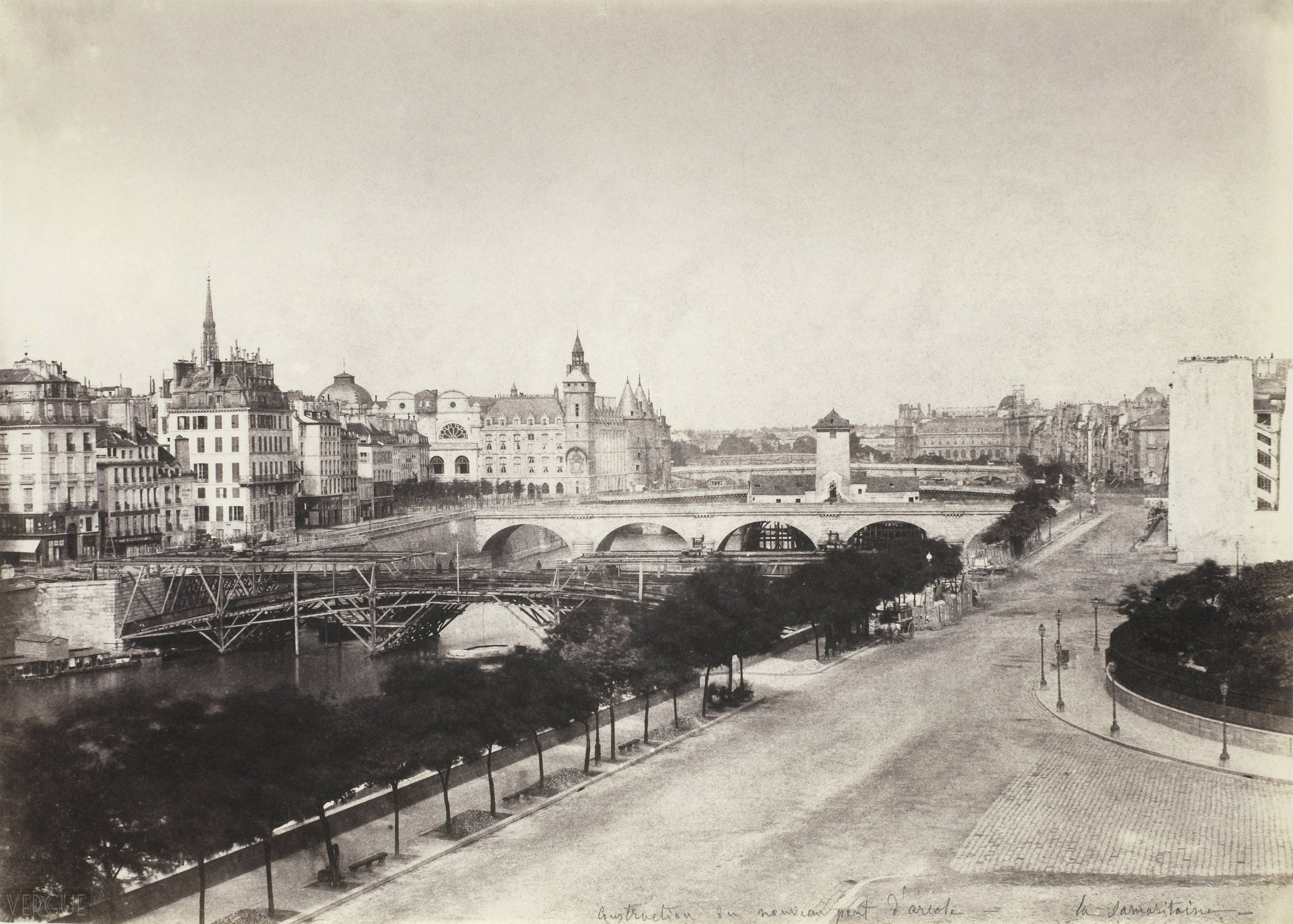
Pont d'Arcole in 1855

The need for a bridge communicating between place de Grève (now Place de l'Hôtel-de-Ville) and the île de la Cité had been felt for years. Called the passerelle de Grève or the pont de l'Hôtel-de-Ville for the first two years of its life, its present name - according to the most generally accepted hypothesis - comes from the Battle of the Bridge of Arcole, in which Napoleon personally led a charge waving the tricolour and defeated the Austrians in 1796. The other hypothesis is that a young republican killed in the "Three Glorious Days" of the July Revolution - cut down as he planted the tricolour - cried "Remember that I am called Arcole" just before his death, presumably as he was imitating Bonaparte's action. This account is reported in the English guide "Paris; Its Historical Buildings and Revolutions" (C. Cox, London 1849)

It was only in 1828 that a suspension bridge for pedestrians with two 6m-wide carriageways, supported from a central pier in midstream, was built by Marc Seguin. In 1854, with increased traffic due to the prolongation of the rue de Rivoli, it was replaced by a more substantial metal structure that could also be used by vehicular traffic. The pont d'Arcole was built to the plans of Alphonse Oudry (1819–1869), retired Ingénieur des Ponts et Chaussées and his partner Nicolas Cadiat; the structure was innovative in that it was the first unsupported bridge across the Seine to be made entirely in wrought iron rather than cast iron. The low arch, only lightly cambered, was also innovative, and on 16 February 1888 it suddenly sagged by 20 cm and had to be consolidated. It was only between 1994 and 1995 that the city council made overall repairs to the bridge's roadways, reviewing its waterproofing and paintwork at the same time.

Location on the Seine

The bridge is also historically notable in that it was over this bridge that the first tanks of Général Leclerc's 2nd Armored Division rolled on their way to the place de l'hôtel de ville during the Liberation of Paris in August 1944.
