= Archbishop's Palace of Paris =

- Palais de l'Archevêché de Paris; Palais Archiépiscopal
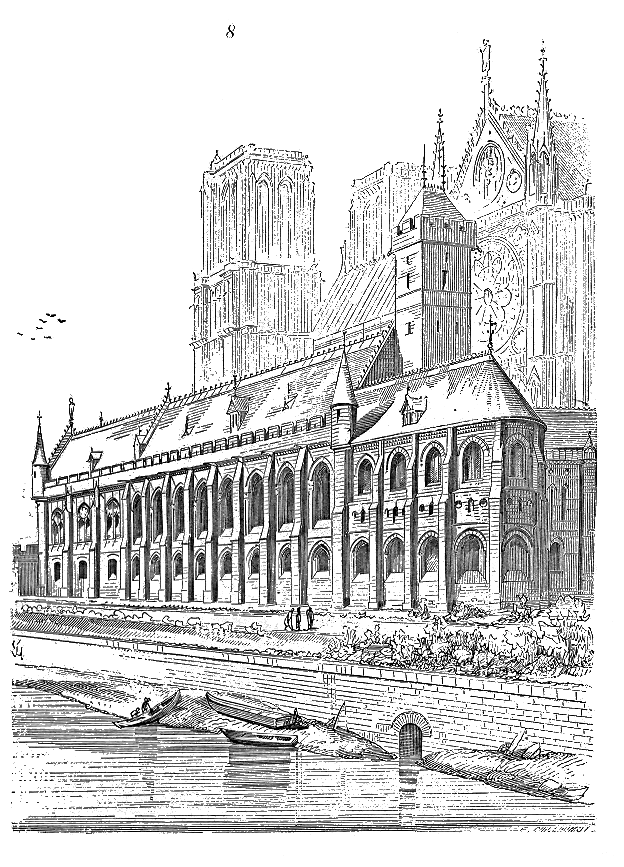
- The Palace in the Middle Ages as imagined in Dictionary of French Architecture from 11th to 16th Century (1856) by Eugène Viollet-le-Duc
- Interactive map of the Archbishop's Palace of Paris area

General information
- Location: South of Notre Dame de Paris, Paris, France
- Coordinates: 48.852572°N 2.349591°E
- Construction started: 1161
- Renovated: 1697
- Destroyed: 13 February 1831
- Owner: Archdiocese of Paris

The Archbishop's Palace of Paris (French: Palais de l'Archevêché de Paris or the Palais Archiépiscopal) was the residence of the Archbishop of Paris, located just south of the Notre-Dame de Paris. It was built in 1161 and destroyed in 1831.

== History ==
It began as the bishop's residence for Maurice de Sully in 1161. The bishopric was elevated to an archbishopric in 1622, and in 1697 the palace was entirely rebuilt by Cardinal de Noailles, except for the chapel, which still existed in 1830. During the French Revolution of 1789, the Constituent Assembly held meetings in it. Afterwards it was inhabited by the chief surgeon of the city's main hospital, the Hôtel Dieu. The chapel, the oldest structure in the complex, became an amphitheatre of anatomy. In 1802 it was restored to the clergy, and Cardinal de Belloy took up residence in it. The palace was destroyed by a revolutionary mob on 13 February 1831.

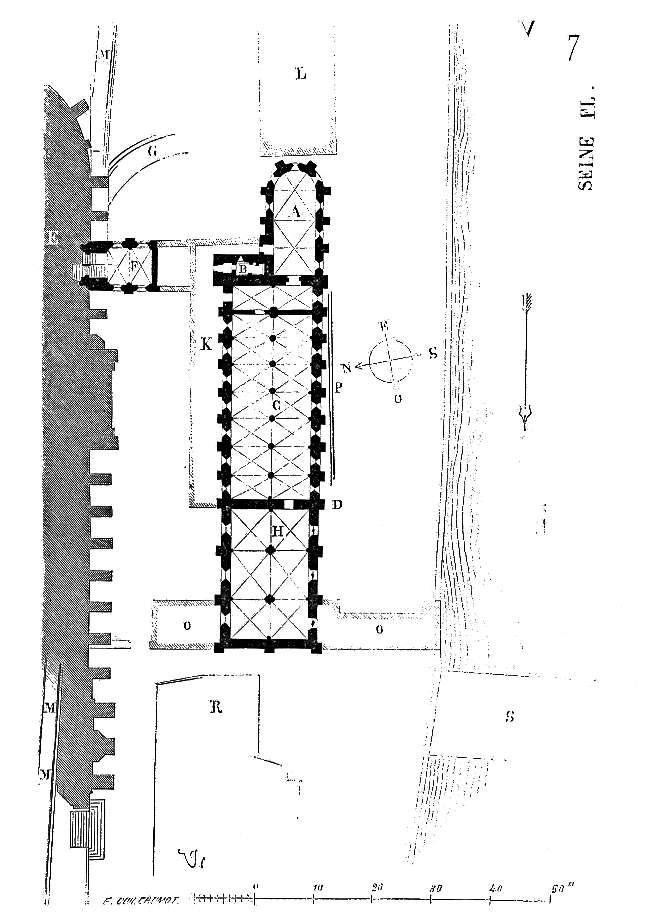
Plan

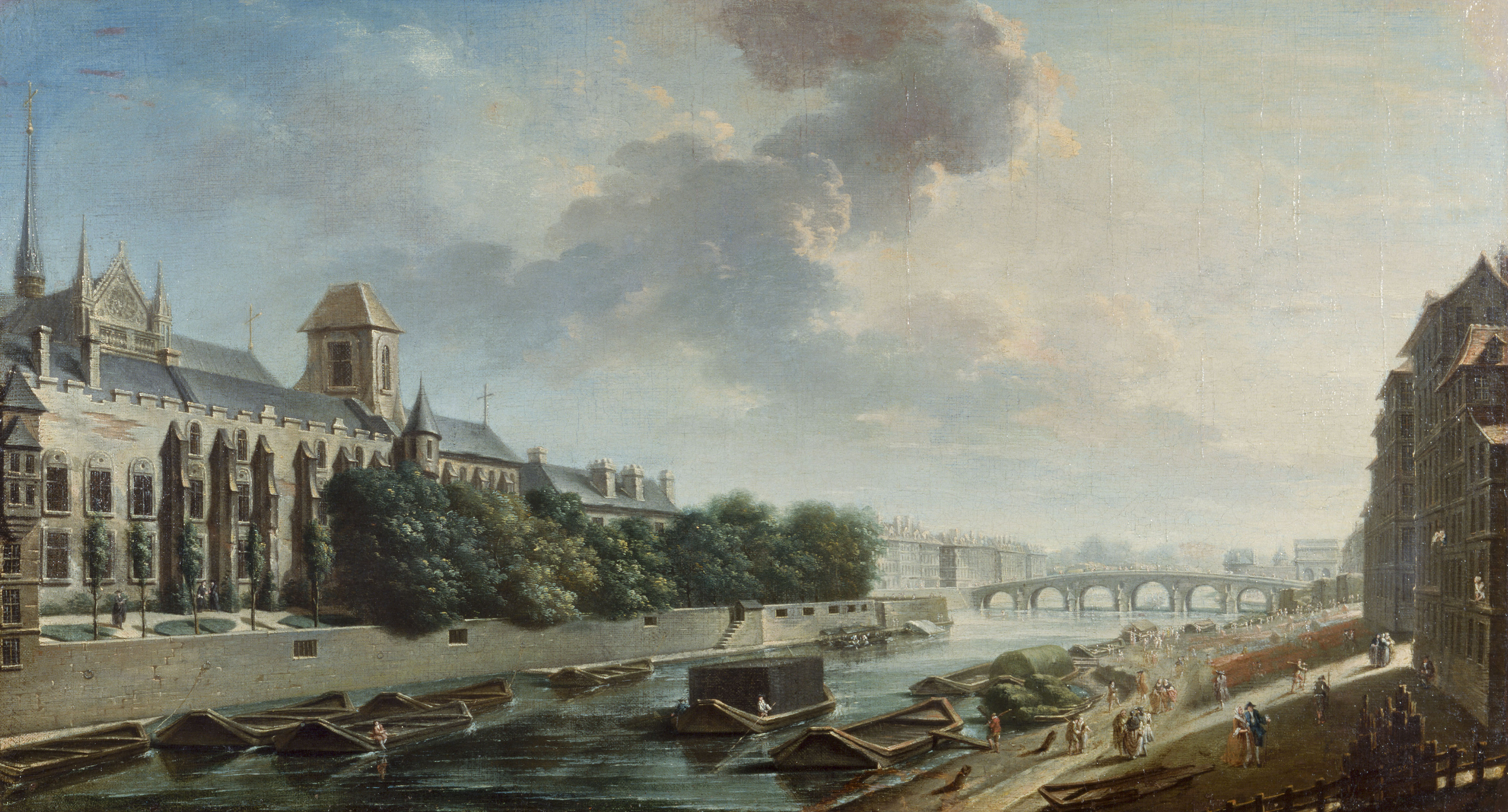
View of the Archbishop's Palace (at left) painted by Raguenet in 1756

== Project of Viollet-le-Duc ==
In 1859, during the period of the Second French Empire, the architect Eugène Viollet-le-Duc drew up plans for the construction of a new palace on the northeast side of the cathedral, but they were never carried out.

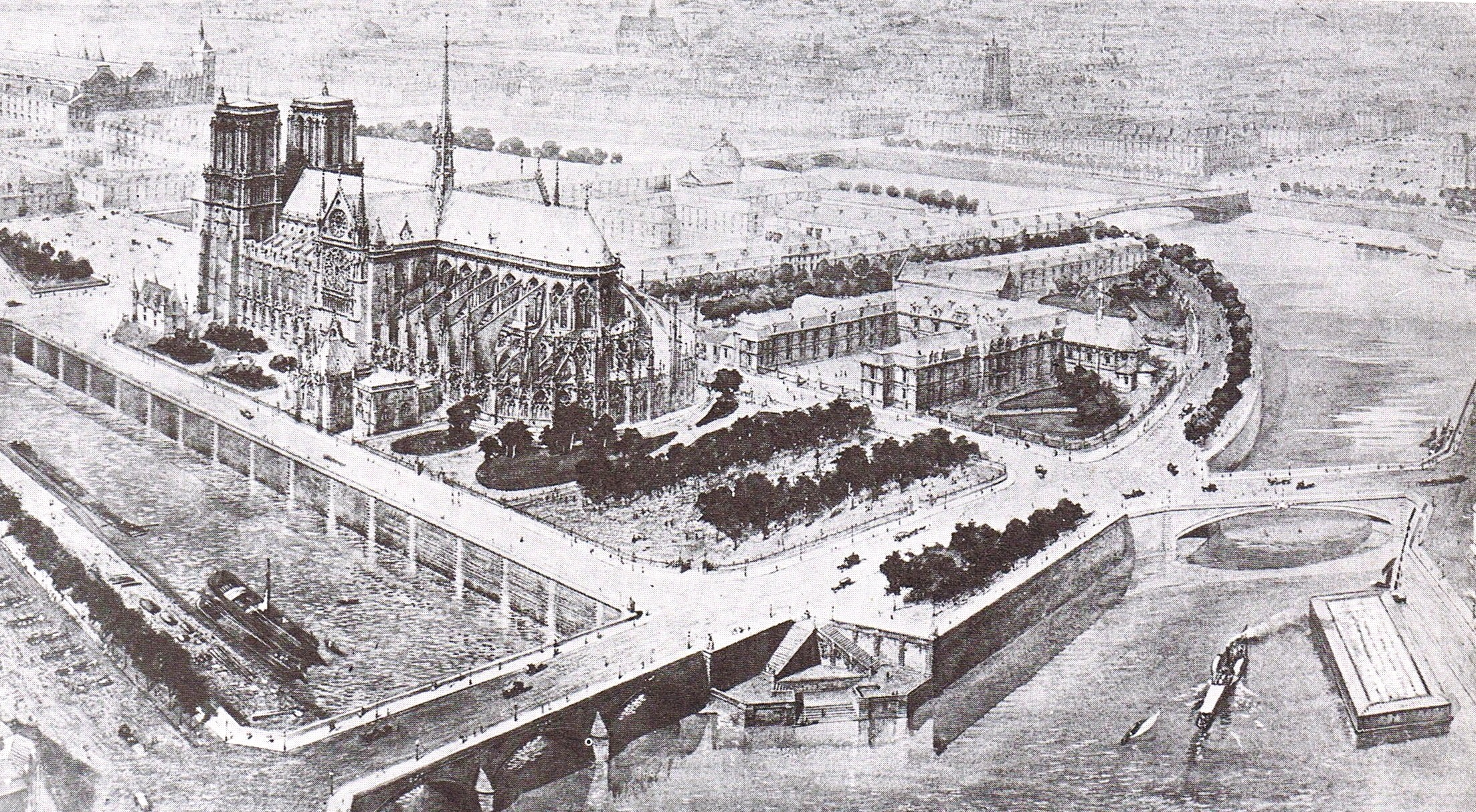
Project for a new palace, created by Viollet-le-Duc in 1859

== Bibliography ==
- Galignani, Anthony (1830). "Palais Archiépiscopal", pp. 206–209, in Galignani's New Paris Guide, July 1830. Paris: A. and W. Galignani.
- Galignani, Anthony (1853). "Archbishop's Palace", pp. 338–339, in Galignani's New Paris Guide, for 1853 (at Internet Archive). Paris: A. and W. Galignani and Co.
