= Giovanni Giocondo =

Italian friar, architect, antiquary, archaeologist, and classical scholar

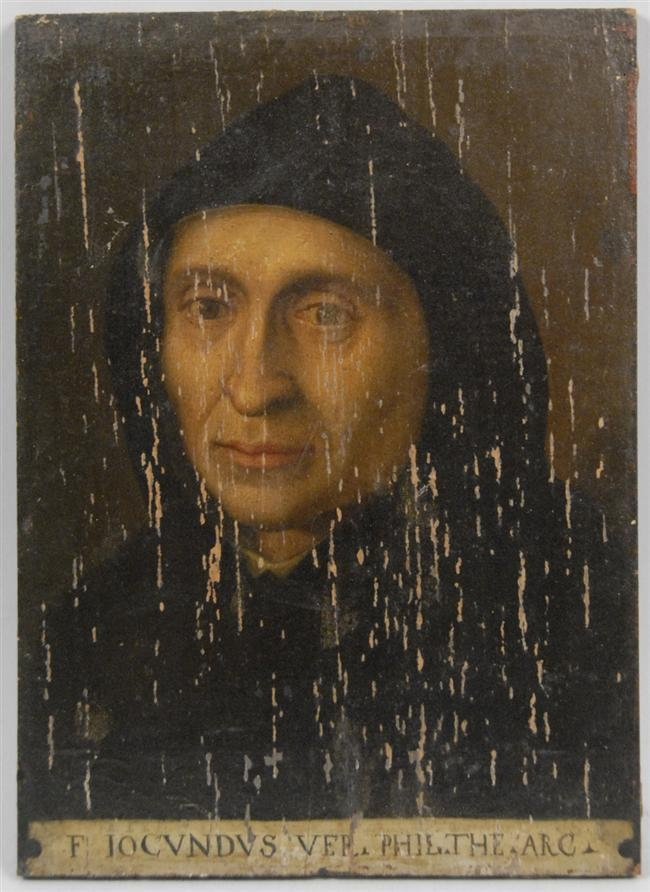
- Giovanni Giocondo portrait
- Born: 1433; Verona, Republic of Venice
- Died: 1515 (aged 81–82); Rome, Papal States
- Occupations: Friar, architect, antiquary, archaeologist, and classical scholar
- Organization: Order of Friars Minor

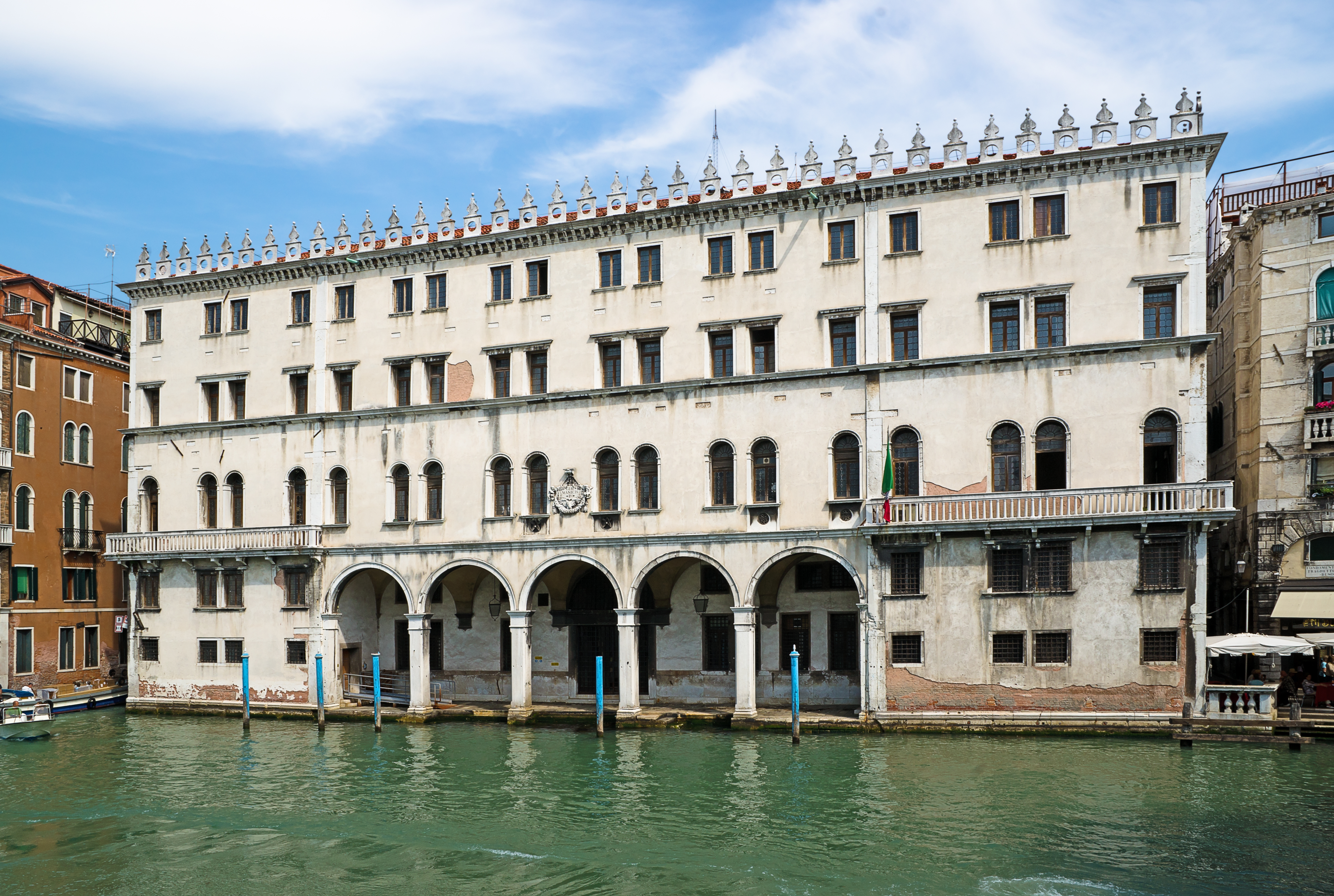
The Fondaco dei Tedeschi.

Giovanni Giocondo, O.F.M., (c. 1433 – 1515) was an Italian Franciscan friar, architect, antiquary, archaeologist, and classical scholar.

== Biography ==
Giovanni Giocondo was born in Verona around 1433. He joined the Dominican Order at the age of eighteen. Afterward, however, he left the Dominicans and entered the Franciscan Order. Giocondo began his career as a teacher of Latin and Greek in Verona, where Julius Caesar Scaliger was one of his pupils.

As a young priest, Giocondo was an archaeologist and draughtsman. He visited Rome, sketched its ancient buildings, wrote the story of its great monuments, and recorded, deciphered and explained many defaced inscriptions. He stimulated the revival of classical learning by making transcriptions of ancient manuscripts, one of which, completed in 1492, he presented to Lorenzo de' Medici.

Giocondo soon returned to his native town where he built bridges and planned fortifications for Treviso, acting as architect engineer, and head-builder during the construction.

== Architectural works ==
In Verona, Giocondo designed the Loggia del Consiglio. Thomas de Quincey also attributes the church of Santa Maria della Scala to Giocondo. He was then summoned to Venice, along with a number of other well-known architects, to discuss the protection of the lagoons against the rivers. Giocondo's plan of altering the Brenta's bed and leading this river to the sea was accepted by the Venetians, and the undertaking was a complete success.

Between 1496 and 1499, Giocondo was invited to France by King Louis XII, and made royal adviser. There he built one bridge of remarkable beauty, the Pont Notre-Dame (1500-1512) in Paris, and designed the Palace of the Chambre des Comptes, the Golden Room of the Parliament, and the Chateau of Gaillon (Normandy), one portal of which has been removed to Paris, and stood for years in the courtyard of the École des Beaux-Arts to serve as a model for students of architecture, and was returned in 1977.

Between 1506 and 1508, Giocondo returned to Italy and constructed the Fondaco dei Tedeschi (1508), which was decorated by Titian and Giorgione. In 1513, the Rialto Bridge and its environs were burned. Giocondo was one of those who presented plans for a new bridge and surrounding structures. The designs of a rival were chosen. Giocondo left Venice for Rome where he was employed by the Vatican from 1514.

In a letter to Giuliano di Lorenzo de' Medici, in 1513, Giocondo referred to himself "an old man". On Donato Bramante's death he was made part of a team with Raphael and Giuliano da Sangallo to superintend the erection of the new St. Peter's Basilica. The work included strengthening the foundations. He died in 1515, while involved with this project.

== Published works ==
In 1498, Giocondo published Pliny's Epistles in Bologna. He published another edition with Aldus Manutius's press (1508), which he dedicated to King Louis XII. Between 1506 and 1508 Giocondo wrote four dissertations on the waters and waterways of Venice.

Giocondo was among the first to produce a corrected edition of De architectura by the classical Roman writer Vitruvius, a treatise that had a major influence on the development of Renaissance architecture. It was an illustrated edition, printed in Venice in 1511, and dedicated to Pope Julius II. Giocondo also published the works of Julius Obsequens, Aurelius Victor, and Cato the Elder's De re rustica. He also edited Julius Caesar's Commentaries and made the first drawing of Caesar's bridge across the Rhine.

In addition to his classical and mathematical knowledge, he was a master of scholastic theology.

Giocondo is sometimes identified as the author of the widely quoted inspirational letter, A Letter to the Most Illustrious the Contessina Allagia degli Aldobrandeschi, Written Christmas Eve Anno Domini 1513. The British Museum, however, stated in 1970 that the authorship of the letter was uncertain. American composer Edwina Florence Wills used the text of the letter in her composition "Radiance and Glory" for voice, violin, cello, and piano.

== Bibliography ==
- Miron Mislin: Die überbaute Brücke: Pont Notre Dame. Baugestalt und Sozialstruktur, Haag + Herchen Verlag, Frankfurt, 1982, Foreword: Julius Posener, ISBN 3-88129-450-3
- Miron Mislin: The Planning and Building Process of two Paris Bridges in the Sixteenth and Seventeenth Century, in: Proceedings of the Second International Congress on Construction History, Vol.2, Cambridge, 2006, p. 2223 - 2239
- Arnold Nesselrath, 'A Little Gift from an Old Friend: Dürer's Drawings by Fra Giocondo', Print Quarterly, XVIII, 2011, 248–48.
- Maria Michailova. Bridges of Ancient Rome: Drawings in the Hermitage ascribed to Fra Giocondo, in The Art Bulletin. — New York, 1970. — P.250—264.
