= Pont au Change =

Bridge in Paris, France

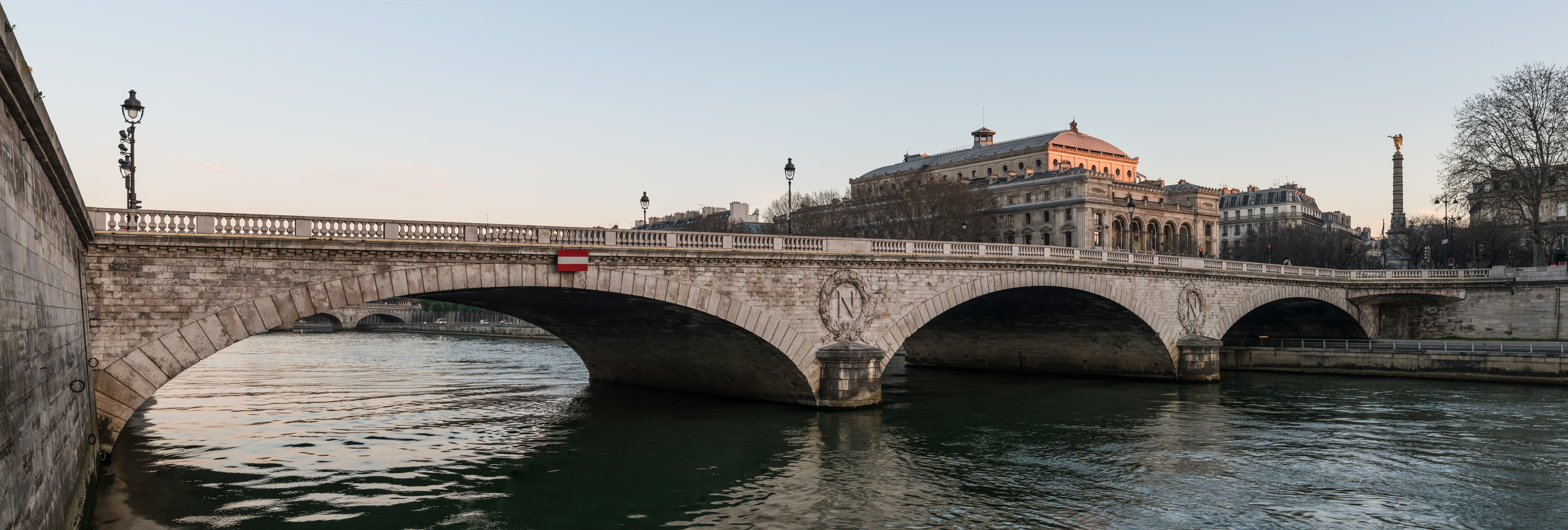
- Pont au Change 2014
- Coordinates: 48°51′24″N 2°20′48″E
- Crosses: The Seine River
- Locale: Paris, France
- Next upstream: Pont Notre-Dame
- Next downstream: Pont Neuf

History
- Construction start: 1858
- Construction end: 1860 (current iteration)

Location
- Interactive map of Pont au Change

The Pont au Change (French pronunciation: [pɔ̃t‿o ʃɑ̃ʒ]) is a bridge over the Seine River in Paris, France. The bridge is located at the border between the first and fourth arrondissements. It connects the Île de la Cité from the Palais de Justice and the Conciergerie, to the Right Bank, at the Place du Châtelet.

== History ==
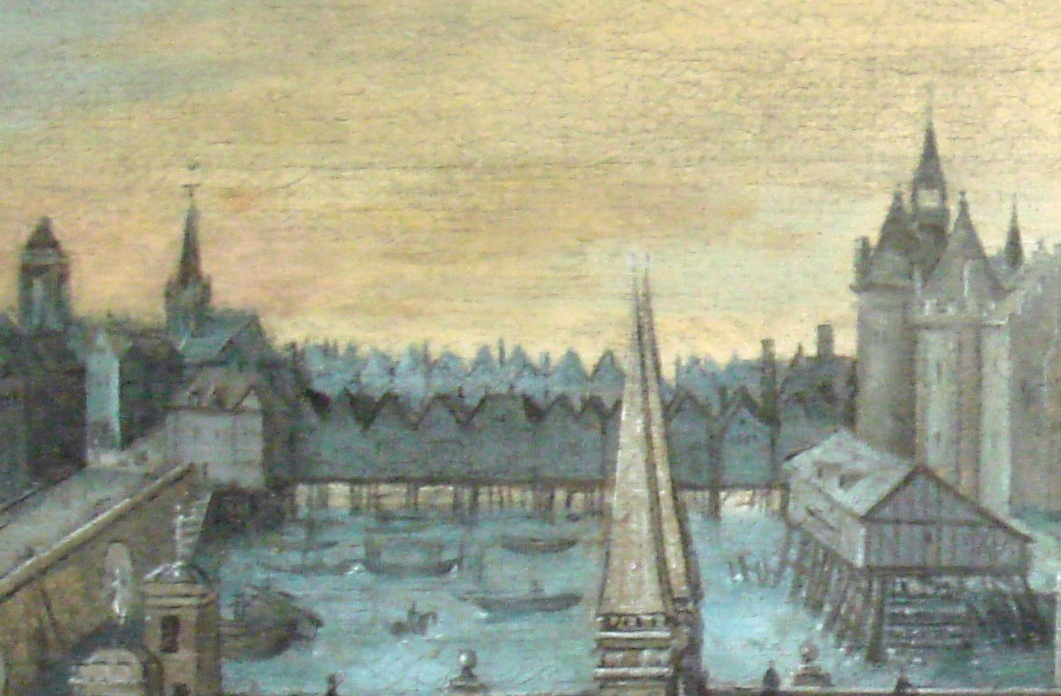
Pont au Change in 1577.

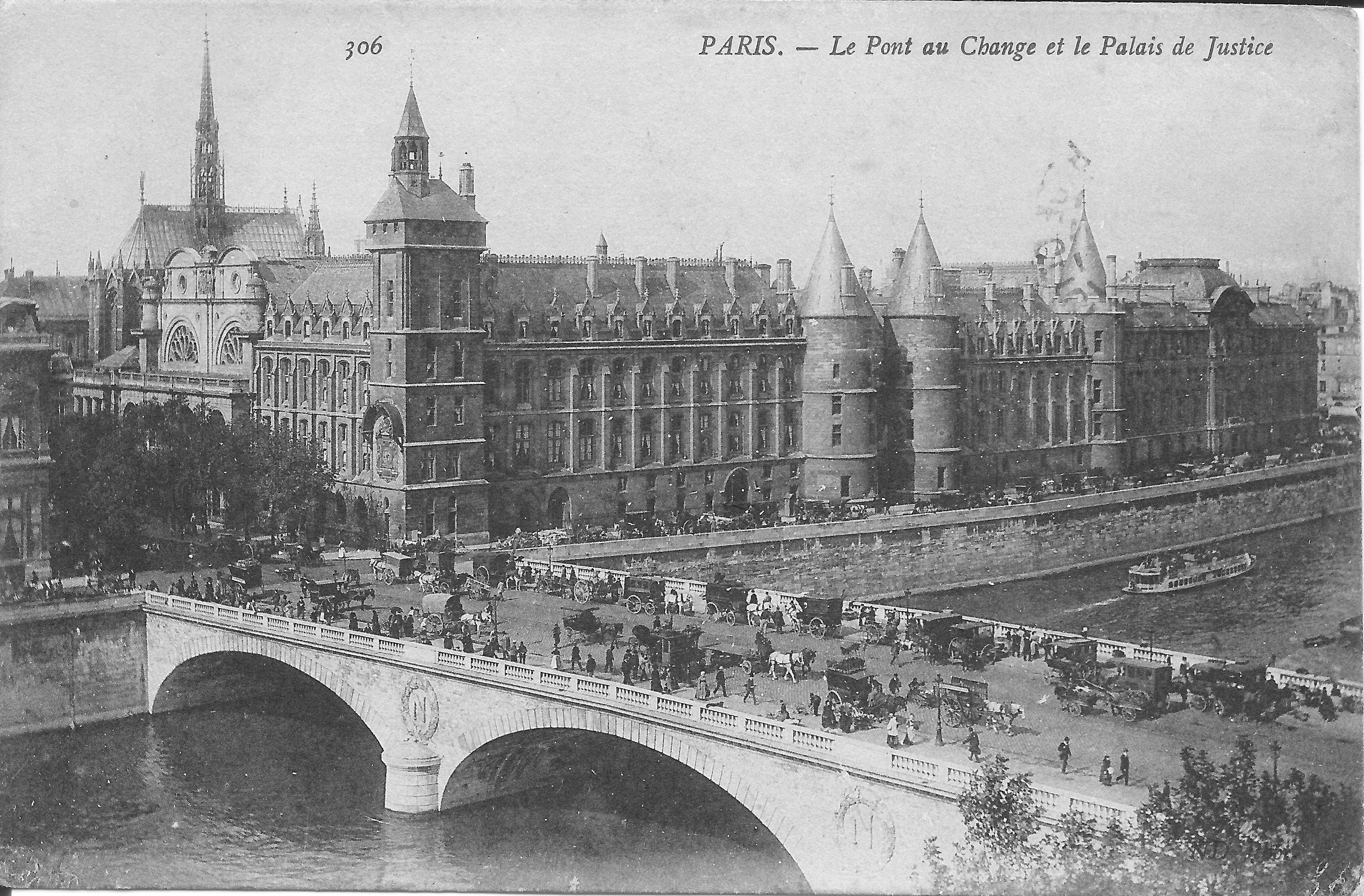
Palais de Justice, Conciergerie and Pont au Change around 1900

Several bridges bearing the name Pont au Change have stood on this site. An early wooden bridge on this site was named the Grande Pont, which would later be commonly, and interchangeably, referred to by other names – Pont aux Changeurs, Pont de la Marchandise, Pont au Change – before the current name became permanent. This cluster of common names came about after a mid-12th century ruling by Louis VII that goldsmiths and money changers must live and work on the bridge. Previous iterations were destroyed by fires, floods and ice floes; the current bridge was constructed from 1858 to 1860, during the reign of Napoleon III, and bears his imperial insignia.

=== In Literature ===
In 1862, two years after the present bridge was completed, Victor Hugo included Pont au Change in the novel Les Misérables. Police Inspector Javert finds himself unable to reconcile his duty to surrender Jean Valjean to the authorities with the fact that Valjean saved his life. He comes to the Pont au Change and throws himself into the Seine. It also plays a role in Patrick Süskind's 1985 novel Perfume: The Story of a Murderer; the perfumier Baldini, who takes the protagonist Grenouille as his apprentice, owns a shop on the bridge. After Grenouille leaves him, the bridge collapses and his house and shop, with him inside, falls into the river. "The Night Watchman of Pont-au-Change" is the title of a poem written by French surrealist poet Robert Desnos, who was murdered in The Holocaust in 1945.

Location on the Seine
