= Place de l'Hôtel-de-Ville – Esplanade de la Libération =

Parisian square

Place de l'Hôtel-de-Ville
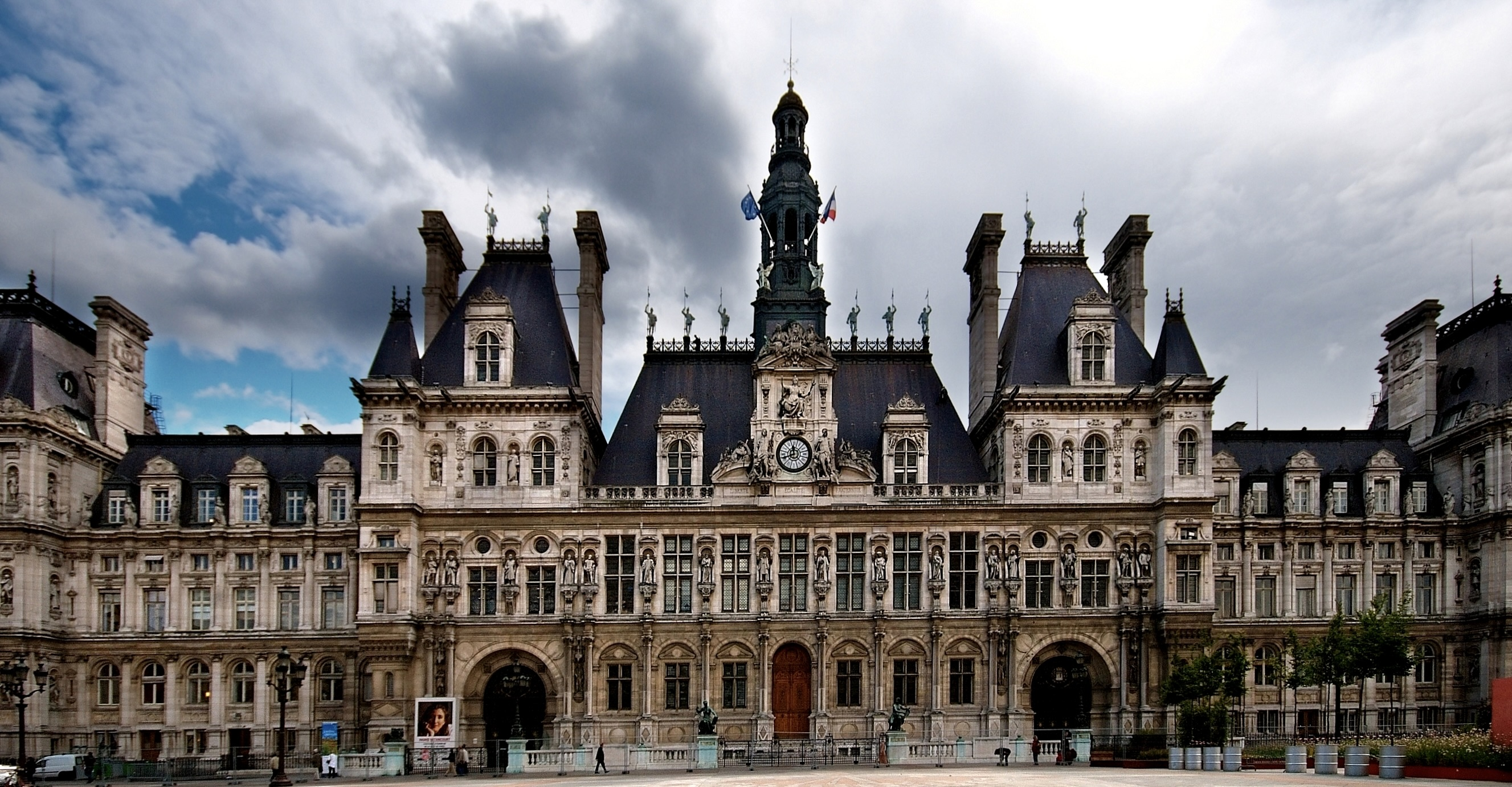

- Location within Paris
- Length: 155 m (509 ft)
- Width: 82 m (269 ft)
- Arrondissement: 4th
- Quarter: Saint-Merri.
- Coordinates: 48°51′24″N 2°21′05″E
- From: 2 quai de Gesvres and quai de l'Hôtel De Ville
- To: 31 rue de Rivoli

Construction
- Completion: Unknown
- Denomination: 1803

The Place de l'Hôtel-de-Ville – Esplanade de la Libération is a public square in the 4th arrondissement of Paris, located in front of the Hôtel de Ville. Before 1802, it was called the Place de Grève. The French word grève refers to a flat area covered with gravel or sand situated on the shores or banks of a body of water.

== The Place de Grève ==
=== Early history ===
The location presently occupied by the square was the point on the sandy right bank of the river Seine where the first riverine harbor of Paris was established.

=== Middle Ages ===
Later it was used as a public meeting-place and also as a location where unemployed people gathered to seek work. This circumstance accounts for the current French expressions, être en grève (to be on strike) and faire (la) grève (to go on strike). In 1244 Louis IX of France ordered 24 cartloads of Talmud manuscripts to be burned at the square.

=== Royal Execution Grounds ===
The principal reason why the Place de Grève is remembered is that it was the site of most of the public executions in early Paris. The gallows and the pillory stood there.

The highest-profile executions took place on the grève, including the gruesome deaths of the assassins François Ravaillac and Robert-François Damiens, as well as the warlord Guy Éder de La Fontenelle. In 1310 the Place de Grève was also the site of the execution of the Beguine heretic Marguerite Porete. On 22 February 1680, the famous French fortune teller, poisoner and alleged sorceress La Voisin was burned to death in the square.

=== The French Revolution ===
On September 14, 1788, anti-monarchy protests renewed, and in October 1788, protestors demanded money for fireworks; they also demanded that anyone in a carriage dismount and salute to Henri IV, and they burned effigies representing Breteuil, as well as Calonne and the Duchesse de Polignac. They then proposed burning Marie Antoinette in effigy, but the troops were deployed and they dispersed the crowds with great bloodshed in the Place de Grève.

Later on, the Place de Grève saw the first use of the guillotine, when robber Nicolas Jacques Pelletier was decapitated on 25 April 1792. Other notable executions included Charlotte Corday, Jean-Baptiste Carrier, and Antoine Quentin Fouquier-Tinville.

== Location ==
The southern end of the Place de l'Hôtel de Ville, the end closer to the river, is on the right-bank side of the Pont d'Arcole, which crosses eighty metres of water to reach the island, Île de la Cité, in the middle of the Seine. At this point on the riverbank, the Place de l'Hôtel de Ville is formed by the convergence of three streets: two quays on the river, Quai de l'Hôtel de Ville, and Quai de Gesvres, and the Rue de Renard. The Rue de Renard, which passes in front of the Paris city hall, the Hôtel de Ville de Paris, forfeits its name for one city block, adopting instead "Place de l'Hôtel de Ville" addresses.

== Metro station ==
The Place de l'Hôtel de Ville is served by the Hôtel de Ville station of the Paris Métro, on lines 1 and 11.
