= Binkowice =

- Village
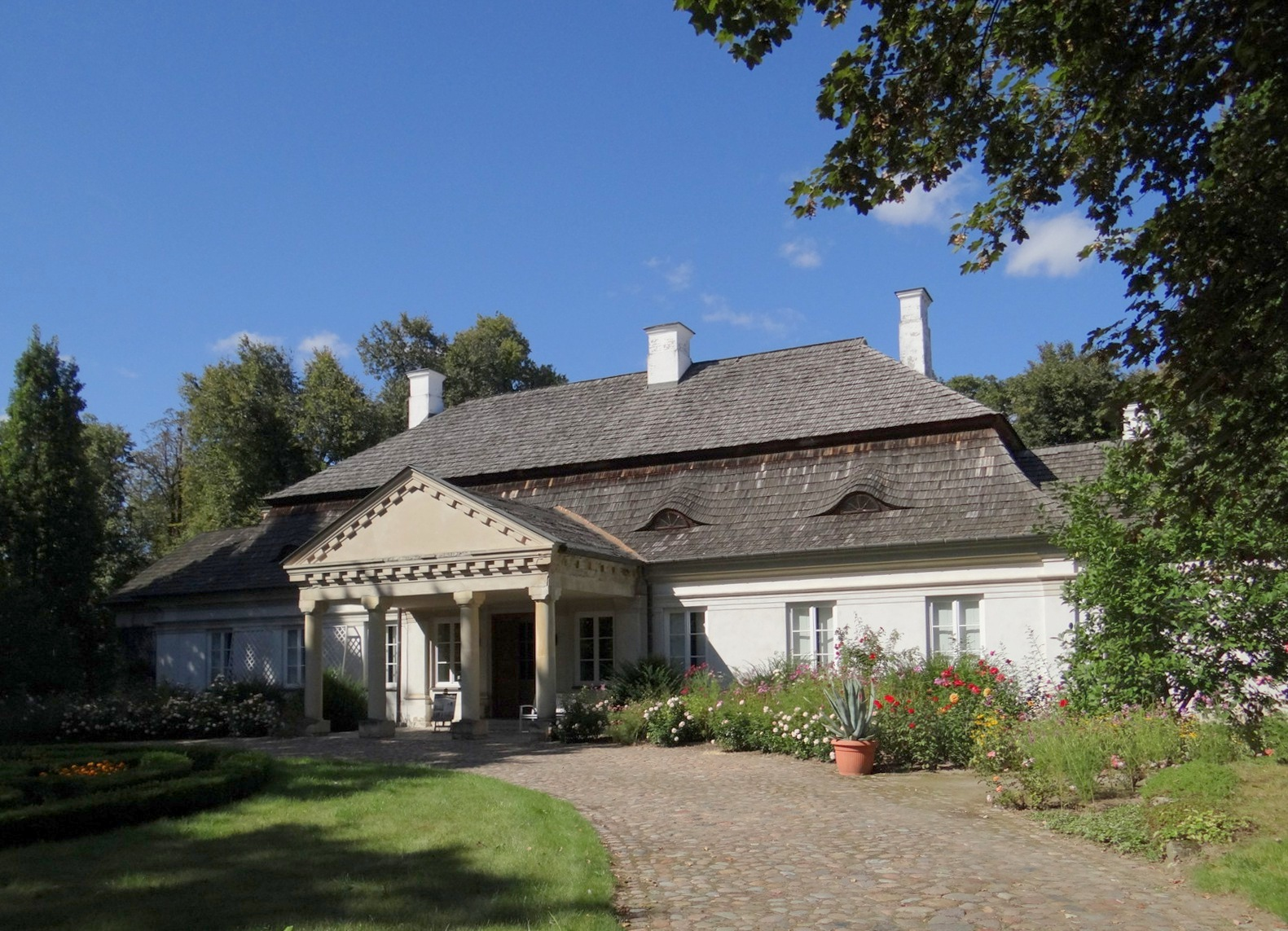
- Manor

- Location within Poland
- Coordinates: 50°49′36″N 21°41′27″E
- Country: Poland
- Voivodeship: Świętokrzyskie
- County: Opatów
- Gmina: Ożarów
- Population: 90

Binkowice [biŋkɔˈvit͡sɛ] is a village in the administrative district of Gmina Ożarów, within Opatów County, Świętokrzyskie Voivodeship, in south-central Poland. It lies approximately 8 km (5 mi) south of Ożarów, 19 km (12 mi) east of Opatów, and 76 km (47 mi) east of the regional capital Kielce.

In the early 17th century the village of Binkowice was owned by nobleman Michał Piekarski, who in 1620 attempted to assassinate king Sigismund III.
