= La Thieuloye =

- Commune
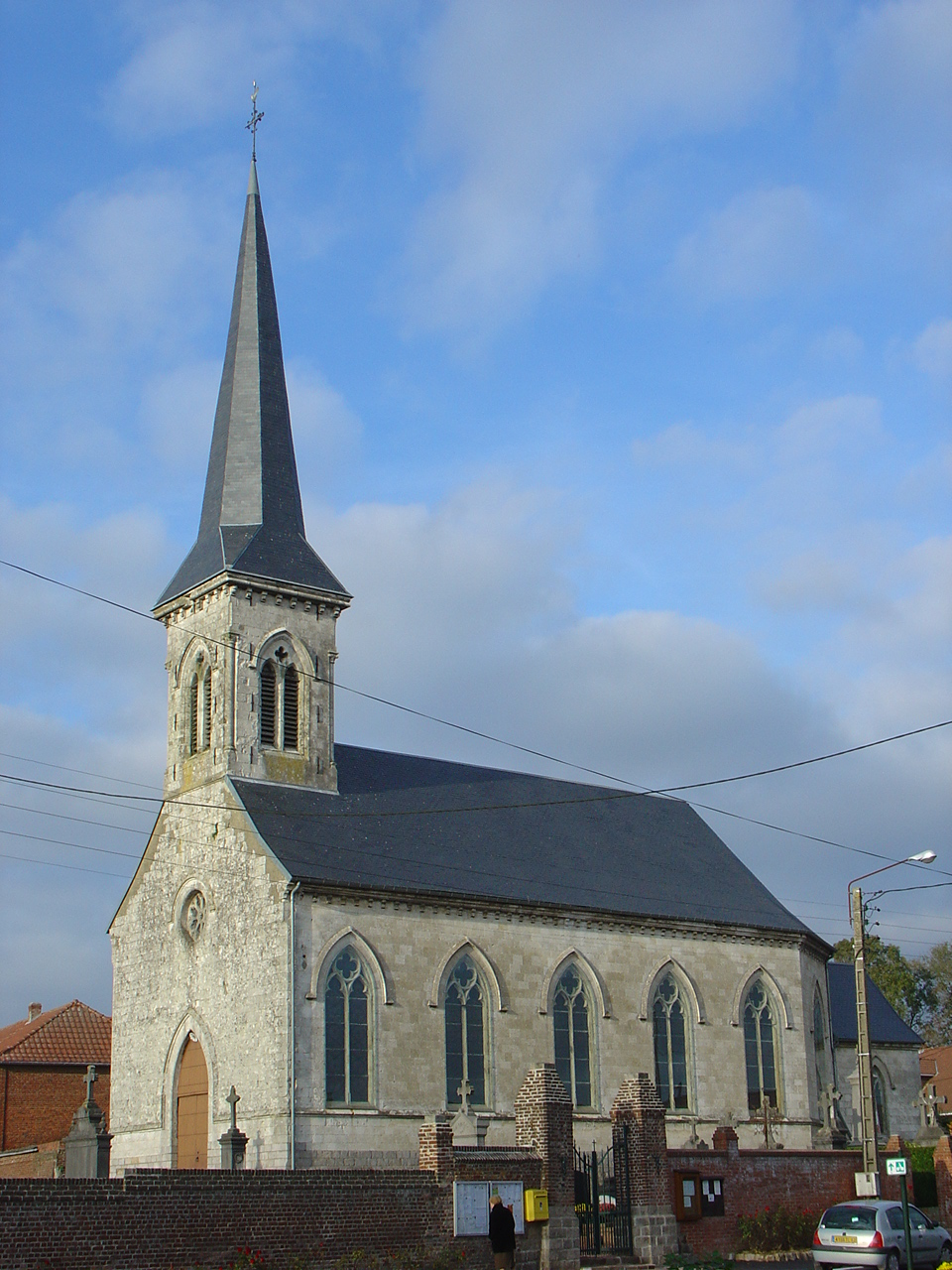
- The church of La Thieuloye

- Coat of arms
- Location of La Thieuloye
- Location within France Location within Hauts-de-France
- Coordinates: 50°24′48″N 2°26′39″E
- Country: France
- Region: Hauts-de-France
- Department: Pas-de-Calais
- Arrondissement: Arras
- Canton: Saint-Pol-sur-Ternoise
- Intercommunality: CC Ternois

Government
  - Mayor (2020–2026): André Flament
- Area^{1}: 4.06 km^{2} (1.57 sq mi)
- Elevation: 150 m (490 ft)
- Highest elevation: 166 m (545 ft)
- Lowest elevation: 135 m (443 ft)
- Population (2023): 476
  - Density: 117/km^{2} (304/sq mi)
- Time zone: UTC+01:00 (CET)
  - Summer (DST): UTC+02:00 (CEST)
- INSEE/Postal code: 62813 /62130
- ^{1} French Land Register data, which excludes lakes, ponds, glaciers > 1 km^{2} (0.386 sq mi or 247 acres) and river estuaries.

La Thieuloye (French pronunciation: [la tjœlwa]) is a commune in the Pas-de-Calais department in the Hauts-de-France region of France. 25 miles (40 km) northwest of Arras.

== Population ==
Historical population
Year	Pop.	±% p.a.
1968	393	—
1975	400	+0.25%
1982	394	−0.22%
1990	394	+0.00%
1999	361	−0.97%
2007	431	+2.24%
2012	475	+1.96%
2017	493	+0.75%
2023	476	−0.58%
Source: INSEE

== Notable people ==
- Robert-François Damiens (1715–1757), attempted assassin of King Louis XV, was born in the village.

== See also ==
- Communes of the Pas-de-Calais department
