= Robert-François Damiens =

French domestic servant and attempted assassin (1715–1757)

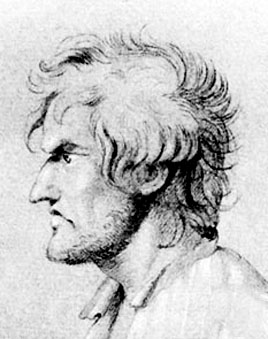
- Born: 9 January 1715; La Thieuloye, Artois, France
- Died: 28 March 1757 (aged 42); Paris, France
- Cause of death: Public execution by dismemberment
- Other name: Robert-François Damier
- Occupation: Domestic servant
- Known for: Attempted 1757 regicide of Louis XV

Robert-François Damiens (French: [ʁɔbɛʁ fʁɑ̃swa damjɛ̃]; surname also recorded as Damier [damje]; 9 January 1715 – 28 March 1757) was a French domestic servant whose attempted assassination of King Louis XV in 1757 resulted in his public execution. He was the last person to be executed in France by dismemberment, the traditional form of death penalty reserved for regicides.

== Early life ==
Damiens was born on 9 January 1715 in La Thieuloye, a village near Arras in northern France. He enlisted in the army at an early age. After his discharge, he became a domestic servant at the college of the Jesuits in Paris. He was dismissed from there, as well as from other employments, for misconduct, which earned him the moniker Robert le Diable ("Robert the Devil").

Damiens's motivation has always been debated, with some historians considering him to have been mentally unstable. From his answers under interrogation, Damiens seems to have been put into a state of agitation by the uproar that followed the refusal of the French Catholic clergy to grant the holy sacraments to members of the Jansenist sect. He appears to have laid the ultimate blame for that on the king and so formed a plan to punish him.

== Assassination attempt ==
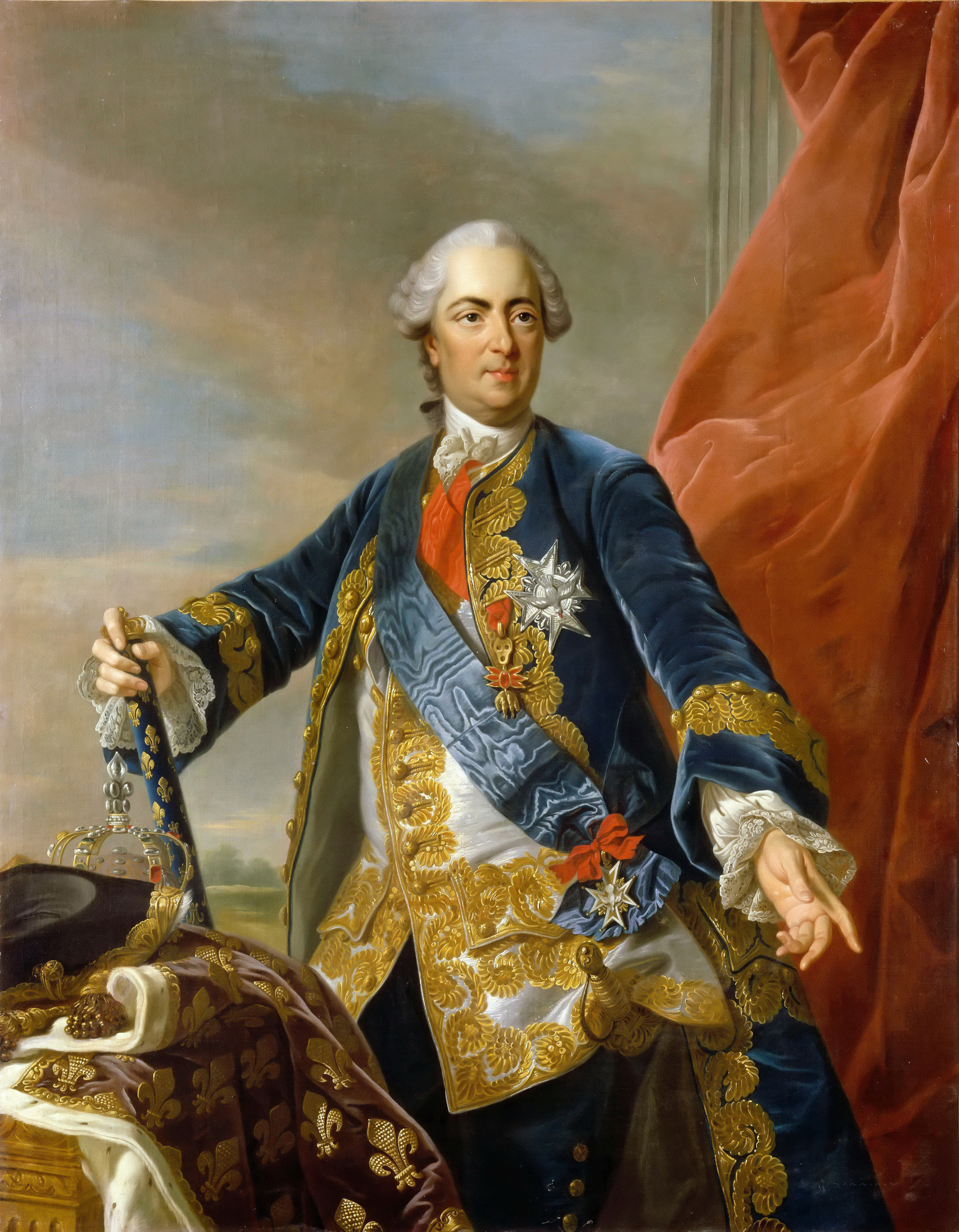
King Louis XV

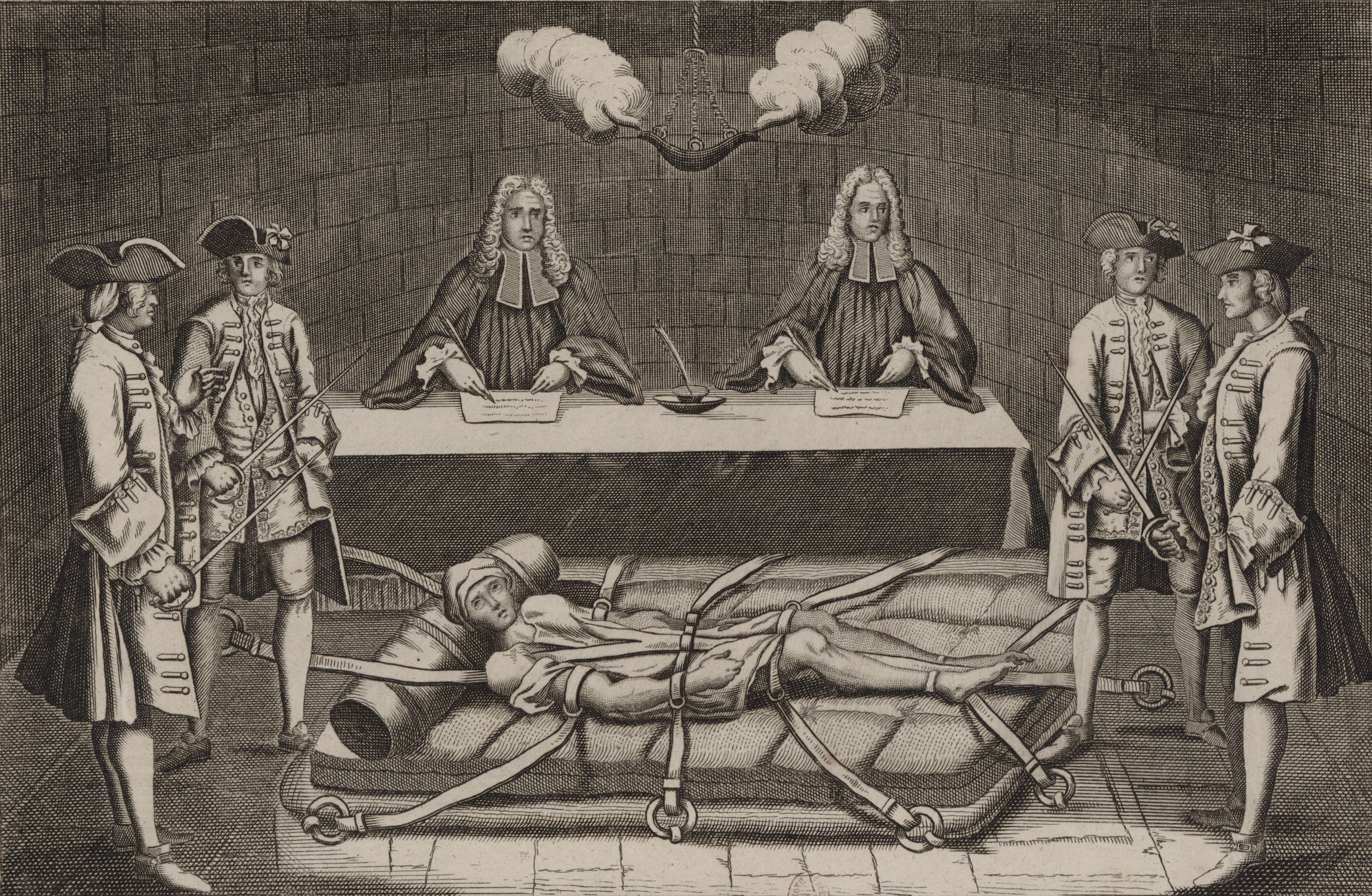
Damiens before his judges

On 5 January 1757 at 4:00 pm, as King Louis XV was entering his carriage at the Palace of Versailles, Damiens rushed past the bodyguards and stabbed him with a penknife. Damiens made no attempt to escape and was apprehended at once. Louis' thick winter clothes were protective and so the knife inflicted only a slight wound, penetrating 1 cm (0.4 in) into his chest. Nevertheless, Louis was bleeding and called for a confessor to be brought to him, as he feared he might die. When Queen Marie ran to Louis' side, he asked forgiveness for his numerous affairs.

Damiens was arrested on the spot and taken away. Despite suspicions of several possible conspiracies being at play, none was ever proven. He was tried and condemned as a regicide by the Parlement of Paris and sentenced to be drawn and quartered by horses at the Place de Grève.

== Torture and execution ==
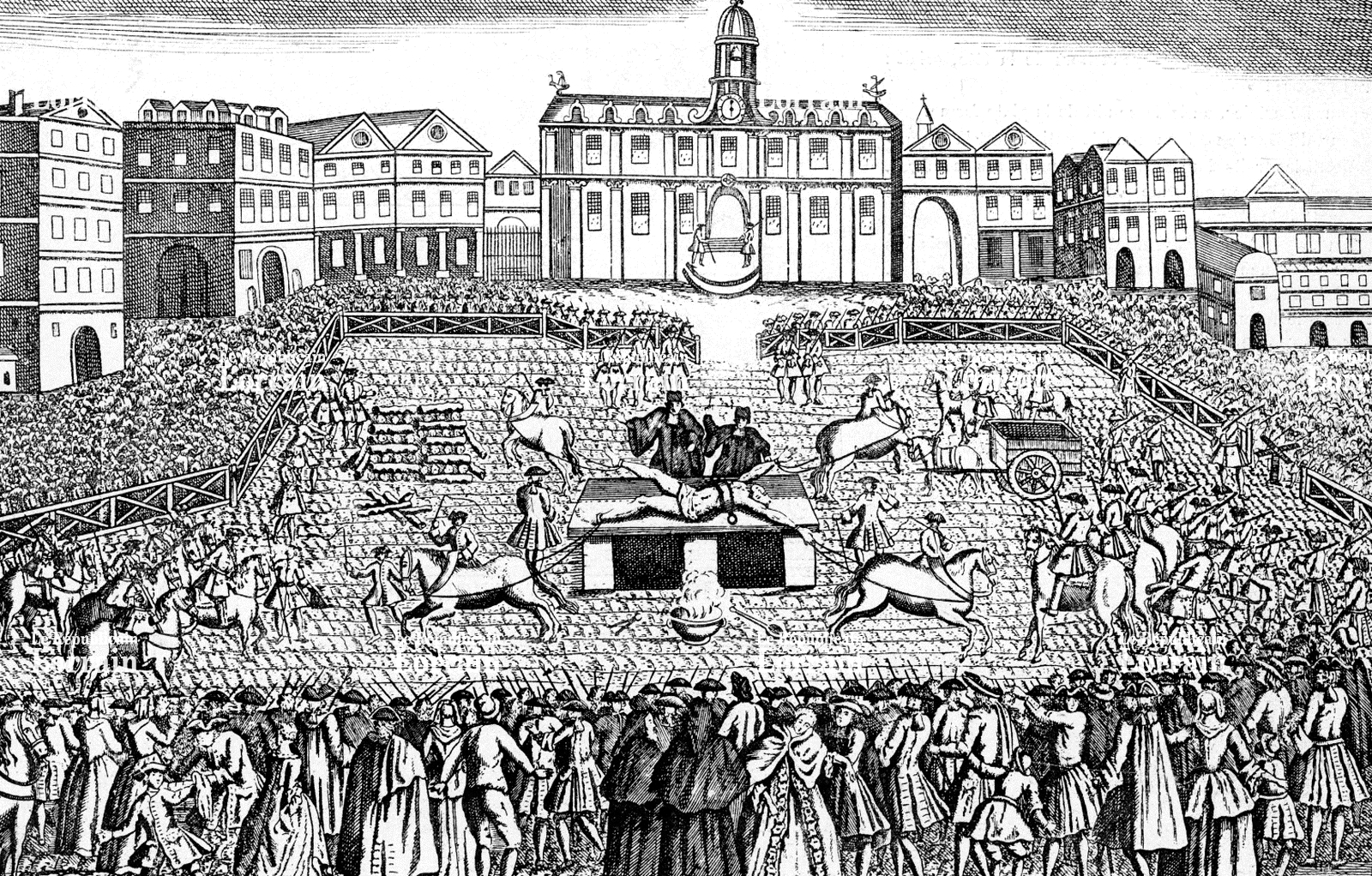
Execution of Damiens

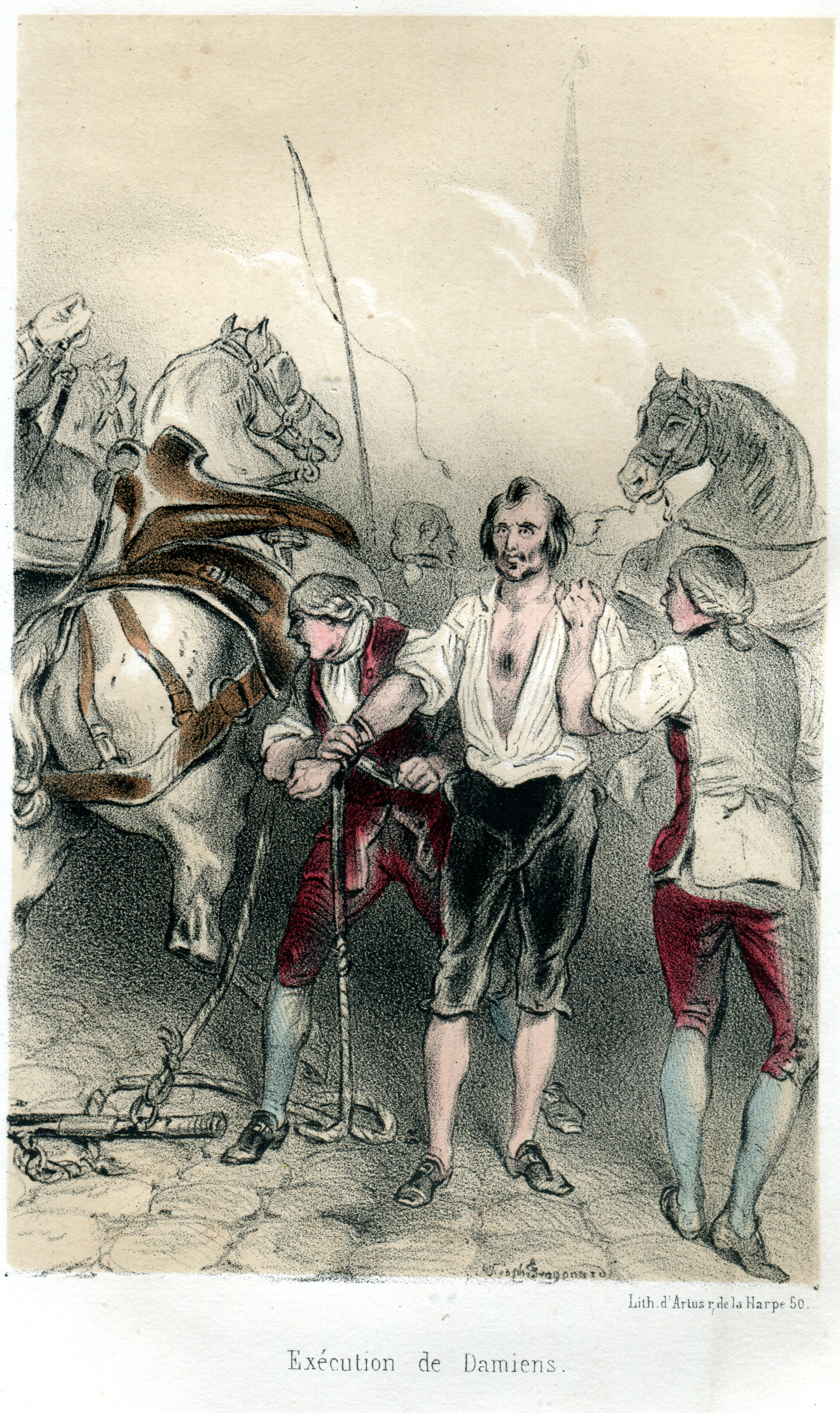
Idealized mid-19th century depiction of Damiens's execution by French illustrator Théophile Fragonard; in reality Damiens would have been supine on an execution platform, mostly unclothed, and hideously wounded from torture.

Fetched from his prison cell on the morning of 28 March, Damiens allegedly said "La journée sera rude" ("The day will be hard"). He was first subjected to a torture in which his legs were painfully compressed by devices called "boots". He was then tortured with red-hot pincers; the hand with which he had held the knife during the attempted assassination was burned using sulphur. Molten wax, molten lead, and boiling oil were poured into his wounds. He was then remanded to the royal executioner Charles-Henri Sanson (who would ironically later go on to execute King Louis XVI) who harnessed horses to his arms and legs to be dismembered. But Damiens's limbs did not separate easily: the officiants ordered Sanson to cut Damiens's tendons, and once that was done the horses were able to perform the dismemberment. Once Damiens was dismembered, to the applause of the crowd, his reportedly still-living torso was burnt at the stake. Some accounts say he died when his last remaining arm was removed.

Damiens's final words are uncertain. Some sources attribute to him "O death, why art thou so long in coming?"; others claim Damiens's last words consisted mainly of various effusions for mercy from God.

== Aftermath ==
After his death, the remains of Damiens's corpse were reduced to ashes and scattered in the wind. His house was razed, his brothers and sisters were forced to change their names, and his father, wife, and daughter were banished from France.

France had not experienced an attempted regicide since the killing of Henry IV in 1610. Damiens's infamy endured. Forty years after his death, the memory of Arras's most notorious citizen was used against another Arras native, Maximilien Robespierre. The polarizing figure of the French Revolution was described frequently by his enemies as the nephew of Damiens. Though untrue, the libel held considerable credibility among royalists and foreign sympathizers. For others, the execution of Damiens became a cause célèbre exemplifying the barbarism of the Ancien Régime.

== Legacy ==
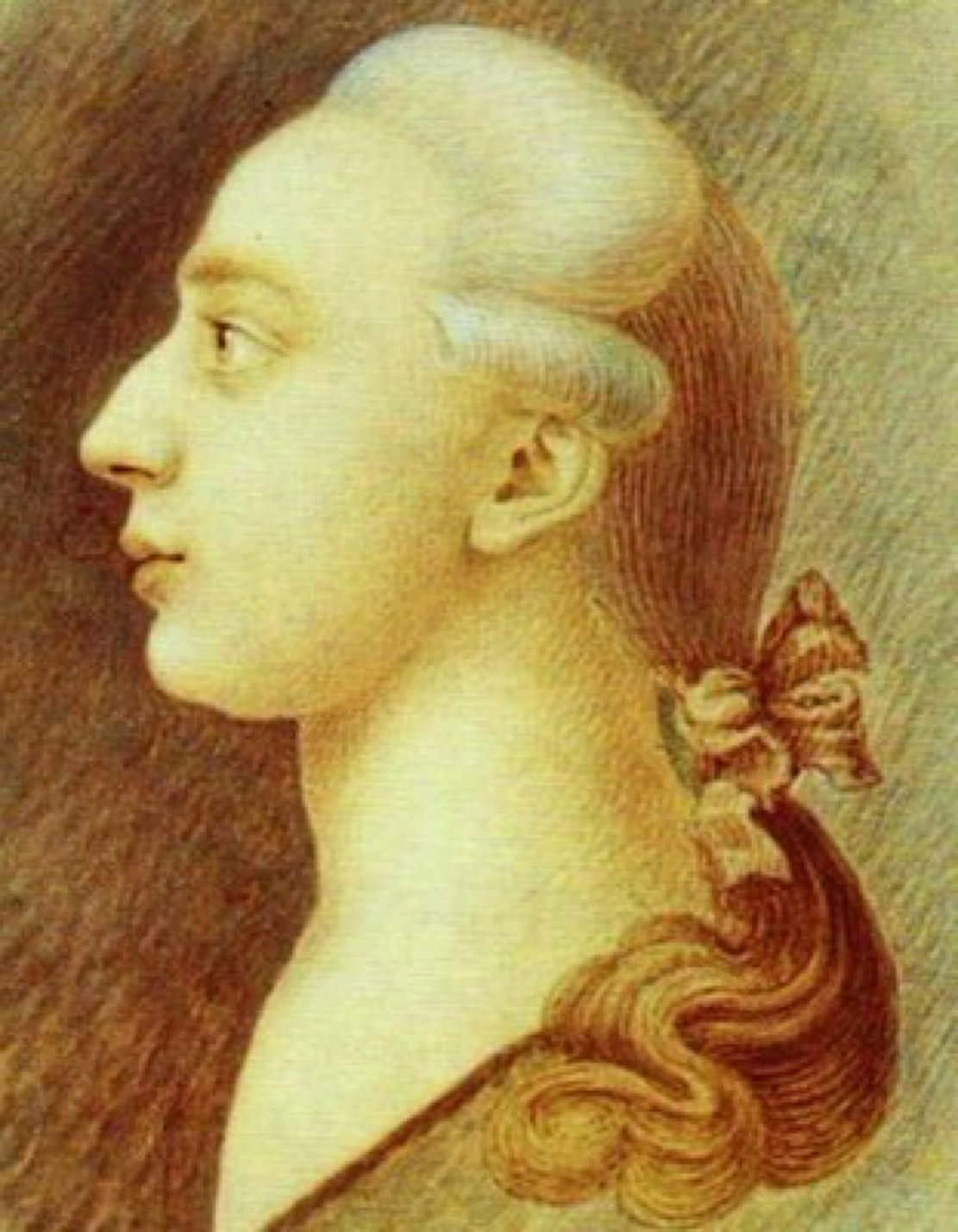
Casanova (pictured) was one of the most notable eyewitnesses of Damiens's execution

The execution was witnessed by 18th-century adventurer Giacomo Casanova, who had coincidentally arrived the same day of the attack, and he included an account in his memoirs:

We had the courage to watch the dreadful sight for four hours ... Damiens was a fanatic, who, with the idea of doing a good work and obtaining a heavenly reward, had tried to assassinate Louis XV; and though the attempt was a failure, and he only gave the king a slight wound, he was torn to pieces as if his crime had been consummated. ... I was several times obliged to turn away my face and to stop my ears as I heard his piercing shrieks, half of his body having been torn from him, but the Lambertini and the fat aunt did not budge an inch. Was it because their hearts were hardened? They told me, and I pretended to believe them, that their horror at the wretch's wickedness prevented them feeling that compassion which his unheard-of torments should have excited.

— Book 2, Volume 5, Chapter 3

=== Philosophical and political responses ===
The critic Ian Haywood has argued that Edmund Burke alludes to Damiens's torture in A Philosophical Enquiry into the Origin of Our Ideas of the Sublime and Beautiful (1775), when he writes "When danger or pain press too nearly, they are incapable of giving any delight, and are simply terrible; but at certain distances, and with certain modifications, they may be, and they are delightful" (emphasis added), punning on "press" to refer to Damiens's ordeal. Philosopher Cesare Beccaria explicitly cites Damiens's fate when he condemns torture and the death penalty in his treatise On Crimes and Punishments (1764). Thomas Paine in Rights of Man (1791) mentions Damiens's execution as an example of the cruelty of despotic governments; Paine argues that these methods were the reason why the masses dealt with their prisoners in such a cruel manner when the French Revolution occurred. Damiens's execution is also described and discussed at length by Michel Foucault in his treatise Discipline and Punish, in examination of the shift in views on punishment which took place in Western culture in the following century. He cites Alexandre Zévaès' work, Damiens le regicide.

=== Literary legacy ===
Voltaire includes a thinly veiled account of Damiens's execution in his novella Candide (1759). The execution is referenced by Charles Dickens in A Tale of Two Cities, Book the Second (1859), Chapter XV:

"One old man says at the fountain, that his right hand, armed with the knife, will be burnt off before his face; that, into wounds which will be made in his arms, his breast, and his legs, there will be poured boiling oil, melted lead, hot resin, wax, and sulphur; finally, that he will be torn limb from limb by four strong horses. That old man says, all this was actually done to a prisoner who made an attempt on the life of the late King, Louis Fifteen. But how do I know if he lies? I am not a scholar."

"Listen once again then, Jacques!" said the man with the restless hand and the craving air. "The name of that prisoner was Damiens, and it was all done in open day, in the open streets of this city of Paris; and nothing was more noticed in the vast concourse that saw it done, than the crowd of ladies of quality and fashion, who were full eager attention to the last – to the last, Jacques, prolonged until nightfall, when he had lost two legs and an arm, and still breathed!"

An allusion to Damiens's attack and execution, and Casanova's account of it, are used by Mark Twain to suggest the cruelty and injustice of aristocratic power in A Connecticut Yankee in King Arthur's Court (1889). Baroness Orczy refers to the incident in Mam'zelle Guillotine (1940), part of the Scarlet Pimpernel series, which features the fictionalised character of his daughter Gabrielle Damiens. There is also a description of the death of Damiens in Peter Weiss's play Marat/Sade (1963).

== See also ==
- François Ravaillac, another French regicide executed in the same manner and location
- György Dózsa, who rebelled against the Hungarian nobility and was brutally executed in 1514.
