= Michał Piekarski =

Polish noble and failed assassin (died 1620)

- Born: Unknown; before 1597; Binkowice, Polish–Lithuanian Commonwealth
- Died: 27 November 1620; Warsaw, Polish–Lithuanian Commonwealth
- Criminal charge: Attempted regicide
- Penalty: Tortured and dismembered

Michał Piekarski (Polish pronunciation: [mixaw piɛkarski]; before 1597 – 27 November 1620), also known as Michael Piekarski, was a Polish petty nobleman and landowner, who attempted to assassinate King Sigismund III in 1620.

== Biography ==
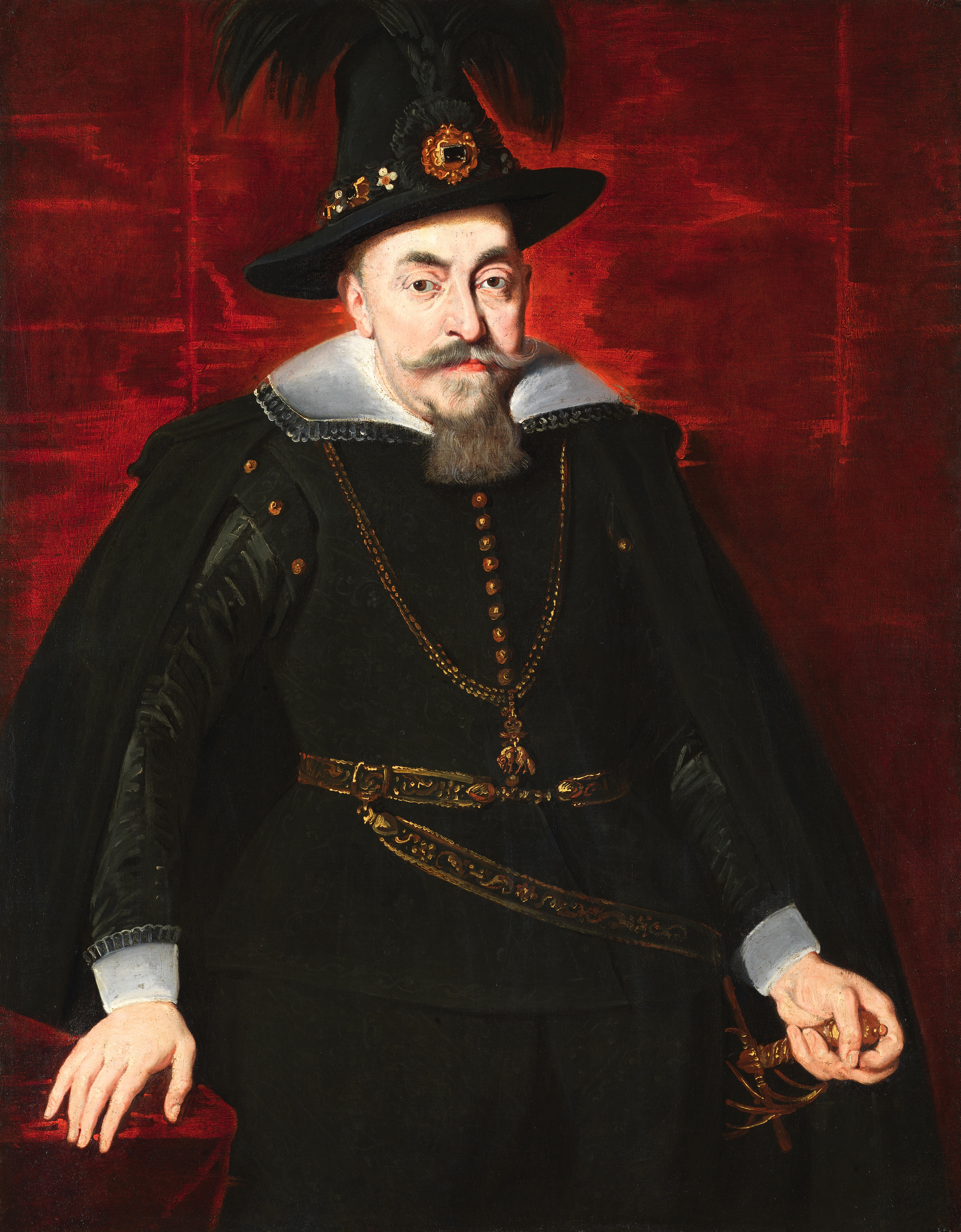
Sigismund III around the time of the assassination attempt

Michał Piekarski, the son of Stanisław, as a child was involved in an accident during which he severely injured his head and began to suffer mentally. He was often described as an impetuous melancholic and an eccentric man. As the illness systematically progressed, Piekarski was temporarily isolated and forbidden from rightfully managing his estates at Binkowice in southeastern Poland where he was most likely born.

In May 1610, when king Henry IV of France was successfully assassinated by François Ravaillac, Piekarski, then still a young man, decided to kill Sigismund III of Poland. He eagerly waited and prepared for almost 10 years before attempting it. He was also drawn towards assassinating the monarch by the failed Zebrzydowski Rebellion, which was organised by the nobility against Sigismund.

Throughout his life Piekarski remained a pious Calvinist. All Protestants and Calvin followers became targeted by Sigismund and the Catholic Church during the Counter-Reformation in Poland. Rumours circulated that it was the Radziwiłł magnate family who played a pivotal role in attempting to murder the king due to religious persecution and their fervent support for Protestantism. These claims, however, were never verified.

== Assassination attempt ==
The attack occurred on 15 November 1620 at approximately 9:00 in the morning when Sigismund was to attend mass at Saint John's Cathedral in Warsaw. The king and a few other members of court as well as guards were walking in a small royal procession to the cathedral from the Royal Castle, which was connected to the temple by a narrow passage, usually unavailable for local townsfolk. Other sources claim that the king was only accompanied by a few men or advisers, and that the manner in which they were to attend mass was casual.

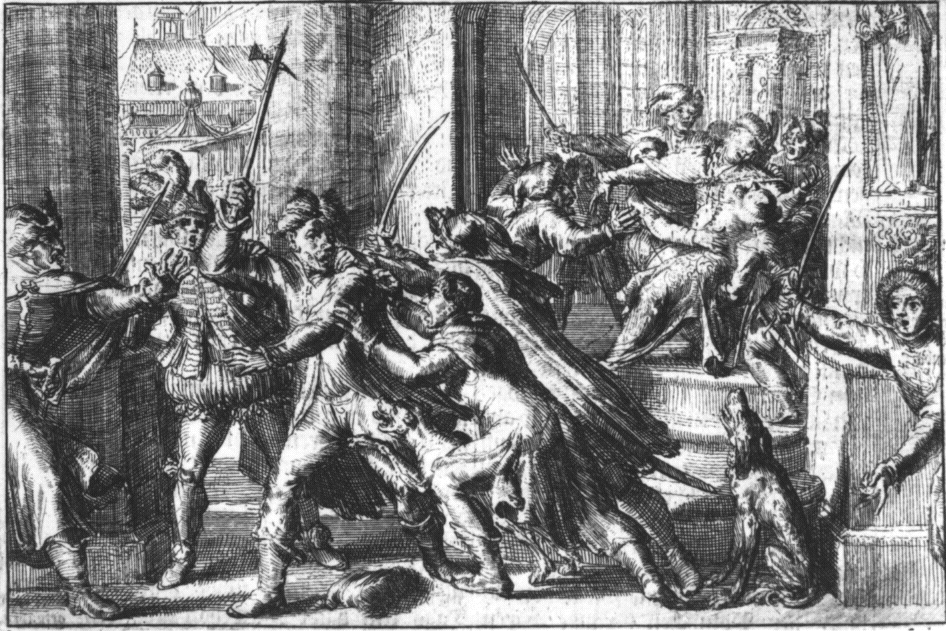
Assassination attempt on Sigismund by Michał Piekarski in 1620.

When the cortege approached the end of the corridor, Piekarski leaped out and stabbed the monarch twice using a czekan (light war axe), firstly in the back and then in the cheek, and striking him in the arm. He was overpowered by either the guards or Court Marshal Łukasz Opaliński, who also shielded Sigismund. Some historians question the presence of any guards in the procession. The perpetrator was also hit in the skull with a sabre by Prince Władysław, which allowed him to be captured and held down.

The assassination attempt quickly became a major event; chaos erupted when false rumours spread that the king had been murdered as his clothes were stained in blood. Initially, the local townspeople thought that the city was being invaded by the Tatars.

== Execution ==
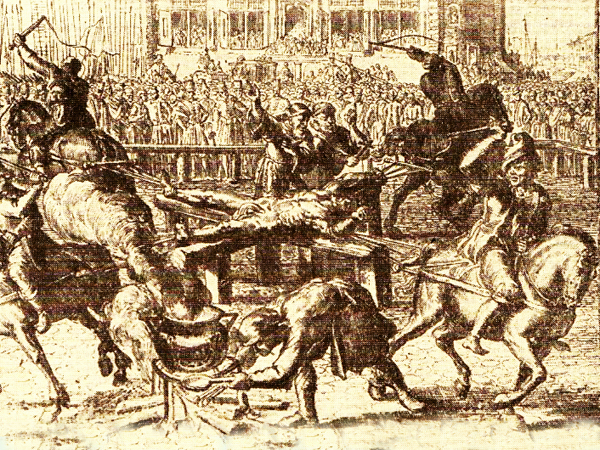
Piekarski being dismembered by horses during execution, 1620

On 20 November, the Sejm (Parliament) presented a verdict sentencing Piekarski to death without trial. The main charge was attempted regicide, which Piekarski did not deny. He was not fond of the king and blatantly offended the Court Marshal and the noble jury. The Parliament ordered the confiscation of his estates; the repugnance of the magnates towards Piekarski was so great that his native village of Binkowice was to be sacked and burned to the ground. It was later spared and the estates were given to a noble who had aided Sigismund during the assassination.

The execution took place on 27 November and an executioner was brought in for the occasion from Drohiczyn. Per sentence, Piekarski was driven around Warsaw and his body was slowly torn up with heated pliers while he was still alive on the cart. He was then placed on a platform situated in an area called Piekiełko (Devil's Den) near the Old Town where his right hand was cut off and incinerated. Towards the end of his tortures Piekarski was tied by his legs and arms and dismembered by horses.

=== Legacy ===
A popular Polish saying "pleść jak Piekarski na mękach", roughly translated as 'to blather like Piekarski during torture', surfaced shortly before Piekarski's execution when he confessed his sins in an unorderly, confusing and lifeless manner. The expression is still used in modern Polish.
