= Dismemberment =

Completely removing the limbs from a living or dead being

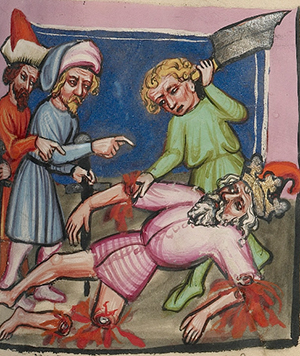
15th-century depiction of Adoni-Bezek being mutilated

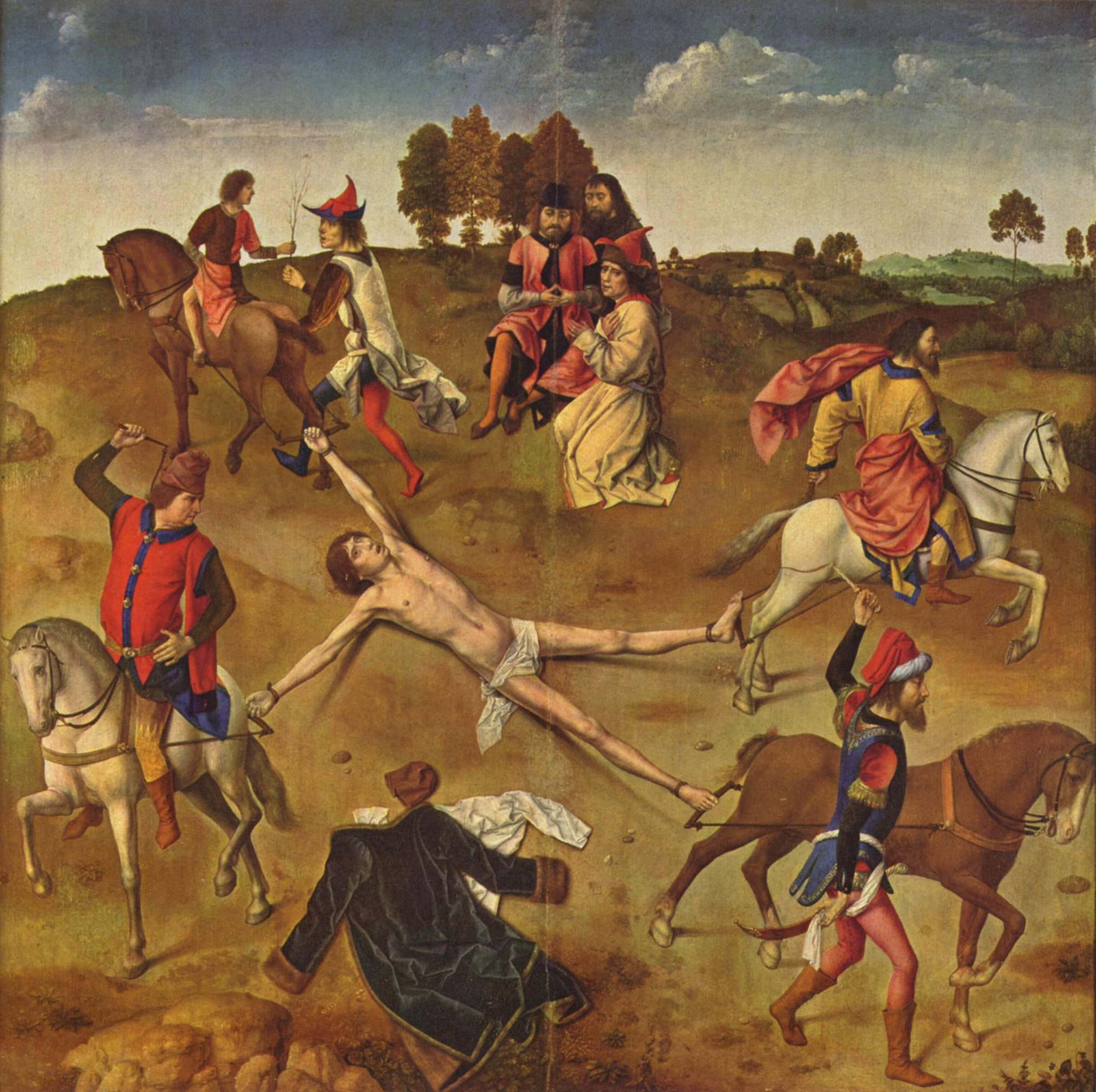
The Martyrdom of St. Hippolytus by Dieric Bouts

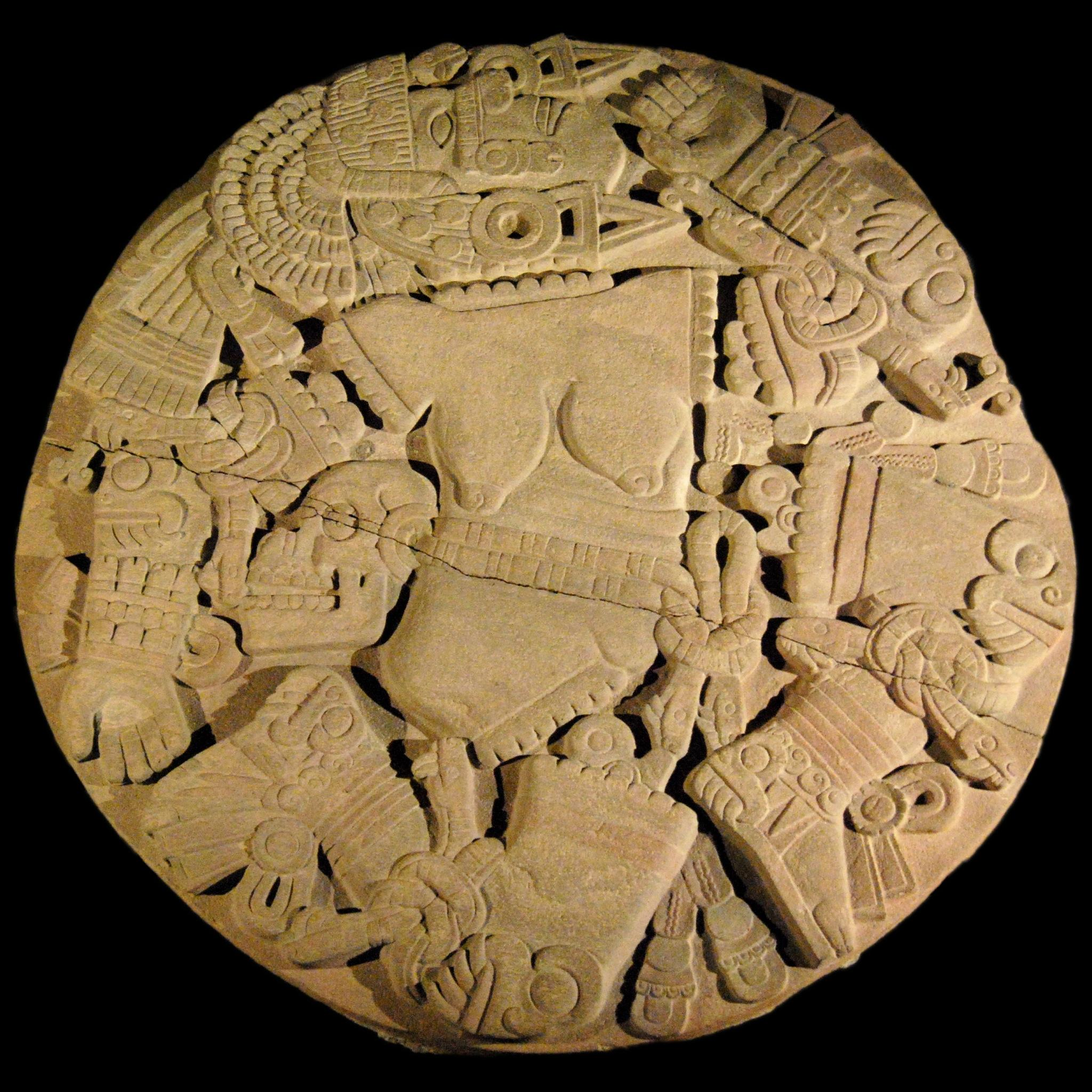
Aztec stone disk depicting a dismembered Coyolxauhqui which was found during construction in 1978 in Mexico City. Its discovery led to the excavation of the Templo Mayor.

Dismemberment is the act of completely disconnecting and removing the body parts such as limbs, skin, or organs from a living or dead being. It has been practiced upon human beings as a form of capital punishment, especially in connection with regicide, but can occur as a result of a traumatic accident, or in connection with murder, suicide, or cannibalism. As opposed to surgical amputation of limbs, dismemberment is often fatal. In criminology, a distinction is made between offensive dismemberment, in which dismemberment is the primary objective of the dismemberer, and defensive dismemberment, in which the motivation is to destroy evidence.

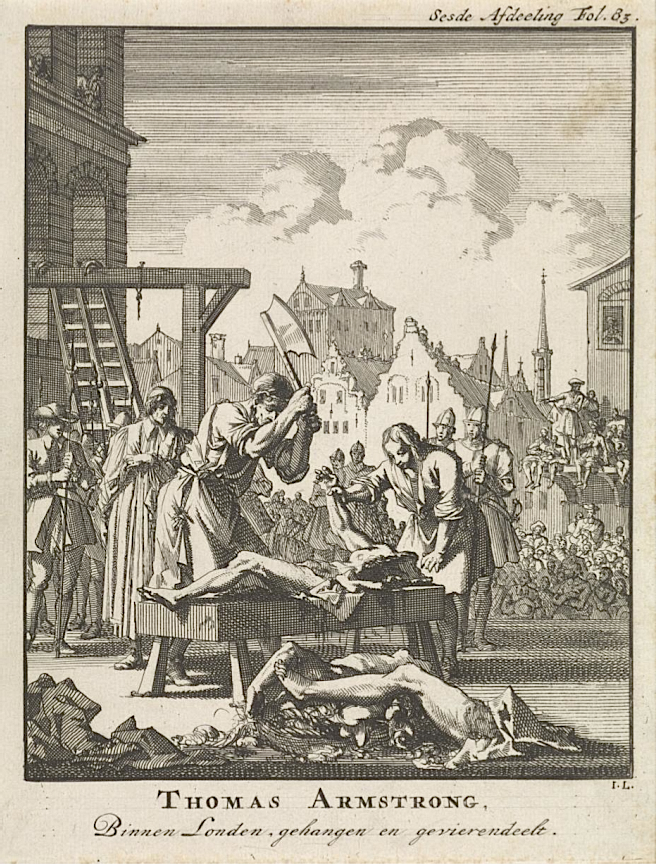
The execution of Sir Thomas Armstrong, who was hanged, drawn, and quartered in England for high treason in 1684

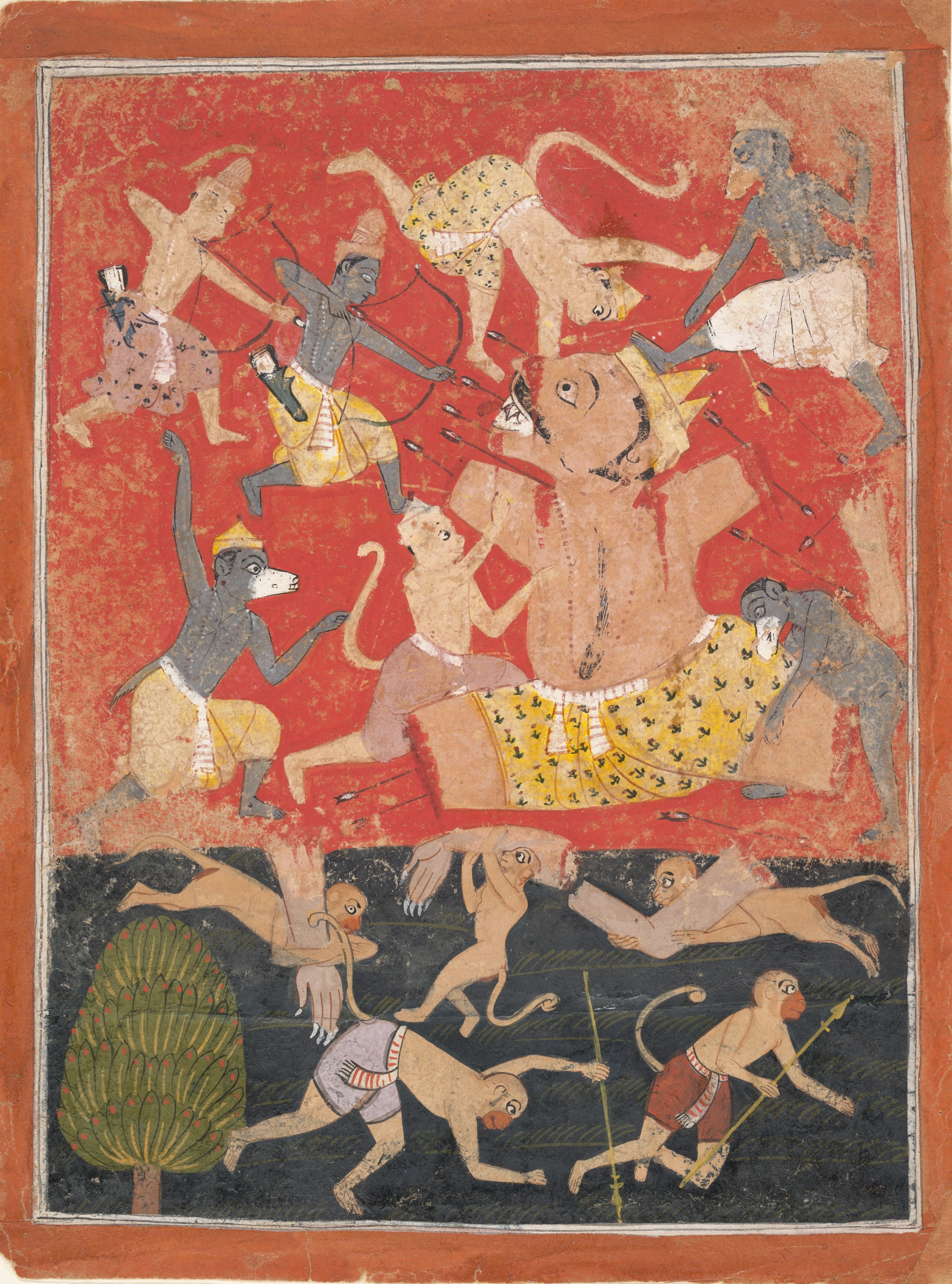
In the Ramayana, the demon Kumbhakarna was dismembered by Rama.

In 2019, American psychiatrists and medical professionals Michael H. Stone, Gary Brucato, and Ann Burgess proposed formal criteria by which "dismemberment" might be systematically distinguished from the act of mutilation, as these terms are commonly used interchangeably. They suggested that dismemberment involves "the entire removal, by any means, of a large section of the body of a living or dead person, specifically, the head (also termed decapitation), arms, hands, torso, pelvic area, legs, or feet". Mutilation, by contrast, involves "the removal or irreparable disfigurement, by any means, of some smaller portion of one of those larger sections of a living or dead person. The latter would include castration (removal of the testes), disembowelment (removal of internal organs), and flaying (removal of the skin)." According to these parameters, removing a whole hand would constitute dismemberment, while removing or damaging a finger would be mutilation; decapitation of a full head would be dismemberment, while removing or damaging a part of the face would be mutilation; and removing a whole torso would be dismemberment, while removing or damaging a breast or the organs contained within the torso would be mutilation.

== History ==
=== Cutting apart ===
==== Slicing to pieces by elephant ====
Particularly in South Asia, execution by trained elephants was a form of capital punishment practiced for several centuries. The techniques by which the convicted person was executed varied widely but did, on occasion, include the elephant dismembering the victim by means of sharp blades attached to its feet. The Muslim traveler Ibn Battuta, visiting Delhi in the 1330s, has left the following eyewitness account of this particular type of execution by elephants:

Upon a certain day, when I myself was present, some men were brought out who had been accused of having attempted the life of the Vizier. They were ordered, accordingly, to be thrown to the elephants, which had been taught to cut their victims to pieces. Their hoofs were cased with sharp iron instruments, and the extremities of these were like knives. On such occasions the elephant-driver rode upon them: and, when a man was thrown to them, they would wrap the trunk about him and toss him up, then take him with the teeth and throw him between their fore feet upon the breast, and do just as the driver should bid them, and according to the orders of the Emperor. If the order was to cut him to pieces, the elephant would do so with his irons, and then throw the pieces among the assembled multitude: but if the order was to leave him, he would be left lying before the Emperor, until the skin should be taken off, and stuffed with hay, and the flesh given to the dogs.

==== Quartering procedure in the Holy Roman Empire ====
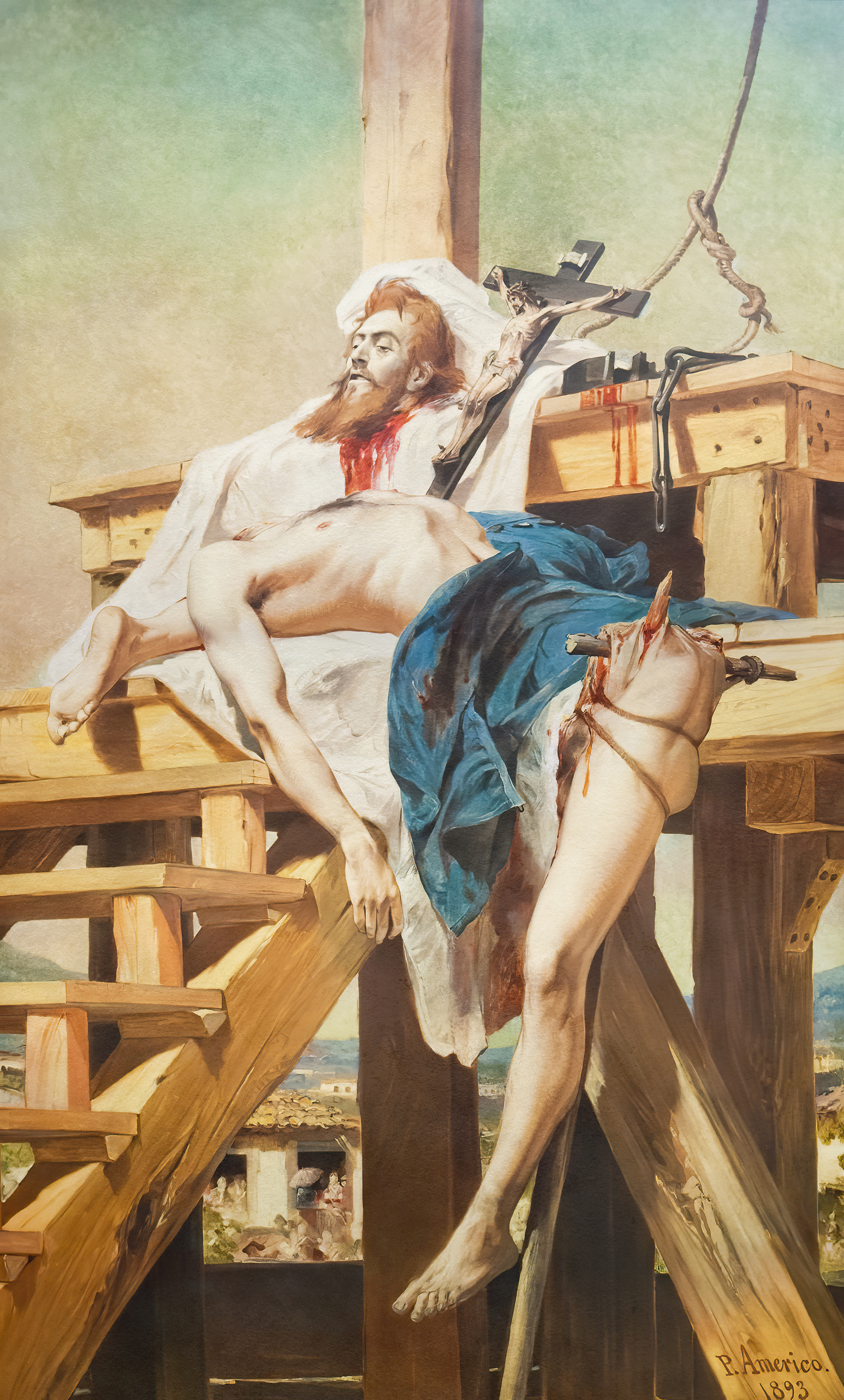
Tiradentes Quartered, Pedro Américo (1893)

In the Holy Roman Empire emperor Charles V's 1532 Constitutio Criminalis Carolina specifies how every dismemberment (quartering) should ideally occur:

Concerning quartering: To cut and hack apart his entire body into four pieces, and thus be punished unto death, and such four parts are to be hanged on stakes publicly on four common thorough-fares.

Thus, the imperially approved way to dismember the convict within the Holy Roman Empire was by means of cutting, rather than dismemberment through ripping the individual apart. In paragraph 124 of the same code, beheading prior to quartering is mentioned as allowable when extenuating circumstances are present, whereas aggravating circumstances may allow pinching/ripping the criminal with glowing pincers, prior to quartering.

Wilhelm von Grumbach was a maverick knight in the Holy Roman Empire; he was fond of making his own private wars and was thus condemned for treason. Gout-ridden, in 1567, he was carried to the execution site in a chair and bound fast to a table. The executioner then ripped out his heart, and stuck it in von Grumbach's face with the words: "von Grumbach! Behold your false heart!" Afterwards, the executioner quartered von Grumbach's body. His principal associate was given the same treatment, and an eyewitness stated that after his heart had been ripped out, Chancellor Brück screamed horribly for "quite some time".

One example of a highly aggravated execution is illustrated by the fate of Bastian Karnhars on 16 July 1600. Karnhars was found guilty of 52 separate acts of murder, including the rape and murder of 8 women, and the murder of a child, whose heart he had allegedly eaten for rituals of black magic. To begin, Karnhars had three strips of flesh torn from his back, before being pinched 18 times with glowing pincers, having his fingers clipped off one by one, his arms and legs broken on the wheel, and finally, while still alive, quartered.

==== Fabled Turkish execution method ====
In the seventeenth century, a number of travel reports speak of an exotic "Turkish" execution method, where first the waist of a man was constricted by ropes and cords, and then a swift bisection of the trunk was performed. William Lithgow presents a comparatively prosaic description of the method:

If a Turke should happen to kill another Turke ... he is brought forth to the market place, and a blocke being brought hither of foure foote high; the malefactor is stripd naked; and then layd thereupon with his belly downeward, they drawe in his middle together so small with running cords, that they strike his body a two with one blow: his hinder parts they cast to be eaten by hungry dogges kept for the same purpose; and the forequarters and head they throw into a grievous fire, made there for the same end – and this is the punishment for man-slaughter.

George Sandys, however, during the same period, tells of a method as no longer in use, in a rather more mythologized way:

... they twitch the offender about the waist with a towell, enforcing him to draw up his breath by often pricking him in the body, until they have drawn him within the compasse of a span; then tying it hard, they cut him off in the middle, and setting the body on a hot plate of copper, which seareth the veines, they so up-propping him during their cruell pleasure: who not only retaineth his sense, but the faculties of discourse, until he be taken downe; and then he departeth in an instant.

==== Shekkeh in Persia ====
In 1850s Persia, a particular dismemberment technique called shekkeh is reported to have been used. Travelling as an official for the East India Company Robert Binning describes it as follows:

the criminal is hung up by the heels, head downwards, from a ladder or between two posts, and the executioner hacks away with a sword, until the body is bisected lengthways, terminating at the head. The two severed halves are then suspended on a camel, and paraded through the streets, for the edification of all beholders. When the shekkeh is to be inflicted in a merciful manner, the culprit's head is struck off, previous to bisecting the trunk.

==== Mughal Empire/Mughal–Sikh Wars and Mughal–Jat Wars ====
Sikh martyr Bhai Mani Singh was dismembered on the orders of Zakaria Khan, the Mughal Subahdar of Lahore after failing to pay tribute.

Veer Gokula Jat, was dismembered on the orders of Mughal emperor, Aurangzeb, in Agra. Gokula was executed for leading the "Jat Uprising of 1669", one of the earliest organised revolts against Mughal Empire in India.

==== Korea ====
Dismemberment was a form of capital punishment for convicts of high treason in the Korean kingdom of the Joseon dynasty. This punishment was, for example, meted out to Hwang Sa-Yong in the Catholic Persecution of 1801.

==== China ====
The Five Punishments is a Chinese variation invented during the Qin dynasty. During the Tang dynasty (AD 618–907), truncation of the body at the waist by means of a fodder knife was a death penalty reserved for those who were seen to have done something particularly treacherous or repugnant. That practice of cutting in two did not originate in the Tang dynasty; in sources concerning the Han dynasty (206 BC – AD 220), no fewer than 33 cases of execution by cutting at the waist are mentioned, but occurs very rarely in earlier material.

Lingchi was a form of torture and execution used from the 10th century until the early 20th century to punish heinous crimes such as treason. Often translated as "slow slicing" or "death by a thousand cuts", a knife was used to remove portions of the body until death.

==== Current use ====
Dismemberment is no longer used by most modern governments as a form of execution or torture, though amputation is still carried out in countries that practice Sharia law.

In 2018, Mohammed bin Salman ordered the assassination of Jamal Khashoggi: Khashoggi was subsequently dismembered in the Saudi consulate in Istanbul on 2 October.

=== Tearing apart ===
==== By four horses ====
Also referred to as "disruption", dismemberment could be brought about by chaining four horses to the condemned's arms and legs, thus making them pull him apart, as was the case with the executions of François Ravaillac in 1610, Michał Piekarski in 1620, and Robert-François Damiens in 1757. Ravaillac's extended torture and execution has been described like this:

He was condemned to be tortured with red-hot pincers on four limbs and on each breast. His wounds were to be sprinkled with molten lead and boiling oil and his body was then to be torn in pieces by four horses, the remains being subsequently burnt.

In the case of Damiens, he was condemned to essentially the same fate as Ravaillac, but the execution did not quite work according to plan, as the eyewitness Giacomo Casanova could relate:

Damiens' agony went on for hours as each torture was applied. When the horses failed to disconnect the sinews between his body and his limbs, his body, still alive, was quartered with a knife. His friend, the infamous Casanova, reports that he "watched the dreadful sight for four hours". "I was obliged to turn away my face and to stop my ears as I heard his piercing shrieks, half his body having been torn from him."

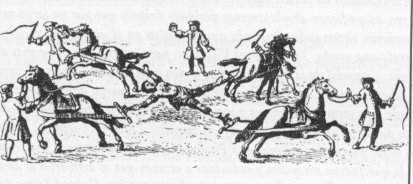
The execution of Túpac Amaru II, who was dismembered by four horses 18 May 1781

As late as in 1781, this gruesome punishment was meted out to the Peruvian rebel leader Túpac Amaru II by the Spanish colonial authorities. The following is an extract from the official judicial death sentence issued by the Spanish authorities which condemns Túpac Amaru II to torture and death. It was ordered in the sentence that Túpac Amaru II be condemned to have his tongue cut out, after watching the executions of his family, and to have his hands and feet tied

to four horses who will then be driven at once toward the four corners of the plaza, pulling the arms and legs from his body. The torso will then be taken to the hill overlooking the city ... where it will be burned in a bonfire ... Tupac Amaru's head will be sent to Tinta to be displayed for three days in the place of public execution and then placed upon a pike at the principal entrance to the city. One of his arms will be sent to Tungasuca, where he was the cacique, and the other arm to the capital province of Carabaya, to be similarly displayed in those locations. His legs will be sent to Livitica and Santa Rosas in the provinces of Chumbivilcas and Lampa, respectively.

==== By five horses ====
Chēliè (simplified Chinese: 车裂; traditional Chinese: 車裂) was dismemberment by tying the limbs and head to five carts led by horses or oxen, which would pull the body apart. It was a form of torture and execution used in ancient China from the Warring States period until the Tang dynasty.

==== By oxen ====
In Japan, the dismemberment by oxen was known as ushizaki, where the victim had the hands and feet tied to the horns of two or four oxen with ropes, with the firewood attached to the oxen being set on fire, causing the rampaging oxen to run in different directions, tearing the victim's body apart, leading to death. Saitō Dōsan from Mino Province and Gamō Hideyuki from Aizu Domain employed this method to punish criminals in their domains, even those guilty of minor crimes by ushizaki or by boiling, with the offenders' wives, parents or siblings being made light the cauldron. However, Hoshina Masayuki abolished said method, along with the death by boiling in his domain. As recorded by the Wakun Shiori,"In Sakai, a Christian convict was executed in this manner." The Article 21 of Tokugawa Ieyasu's "One Hundred Articles of Testimony", "severe punishments such as tearing apart by oxen and boiling on the cauldron are beyond the reach of the Shogun". According to the Kaga Domain's Criminal Record Index, an ashigaru carrying a samurai sword was executed by *ushizaki* for acts of shudō. Said execution method was used between the Warring States period and the Edo period, being abolished during the Meiji period.

==== Fate of Queen Brunhilda ====
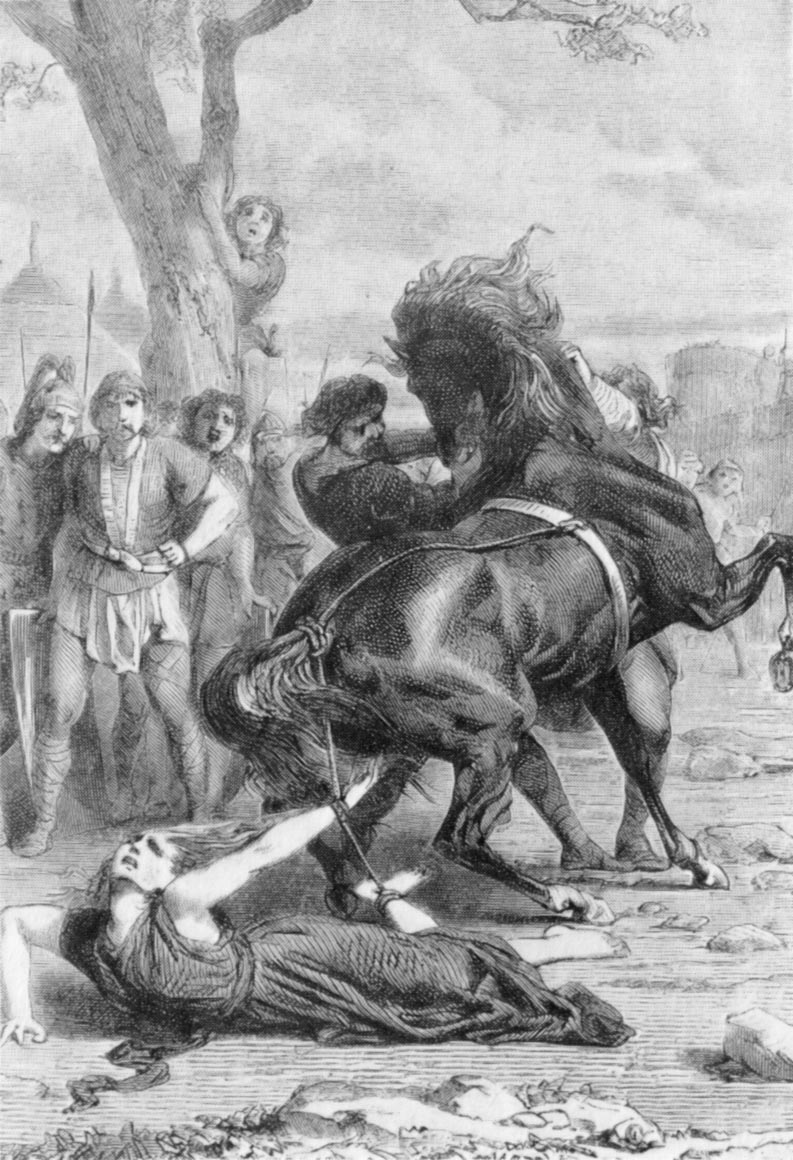
Execution of Brunhilda, engraving by Paul Girardet after Henri Félix Emmanuel Philippoteaux

Queen Brunhilda of Austrasia, executed in 613, is generally regarded to have suffered the same death, though one account has it that she was tied to the tail of a single horse and thus suffered more of a dragging death. The Liber Historiae Francorum, an eighth century chronicle, describes her death by dismemberment as follows:

Then King Chlothar ordered that she be lifted onto a camel and led through the entire army. Then she was tied to the feet of wild horses and torn apart limb from limb. Finally, she died.

The story of Brunhilda being tied to the tail of a single horse (and then to die in some gruesome manner) is promoted, for example, by Ted Byfield (2003), in which he writes: "Then they tied her to the tail of a wild horse; whipped into frenzy, it kicked her to death". The cited source for this claim, however, the seventh century Life of St. Columban by the monk Jonas, does not support this claim. In paragraph 58 in his work, Jonas just writes: "but Brunhilda he had placed first on a camel in mockery and so exhibited to all her enemies round about then she was bound to the tails of wild horses and thus perished wretchedly".

The storyline of Brunhilda being tied to the tail of a single horse and being subsequently dragged to death has become a classical motif in artistic representations, as can be seen by the included image.

==== Torn apart by four ships ====
According to Olfert Dapper, a 17th-century Dutchman who meticulously collected reports from faraway countries from seamen and other travelers, a fairly frequent maritime death penalty among the Barbary corsairs was to affix the hands and feet to chains on four different ships. When the ships then sailed off in different directions, the chains grew taut, and the man in between was torn apart after a while.

==== Torn apart by two trees ====
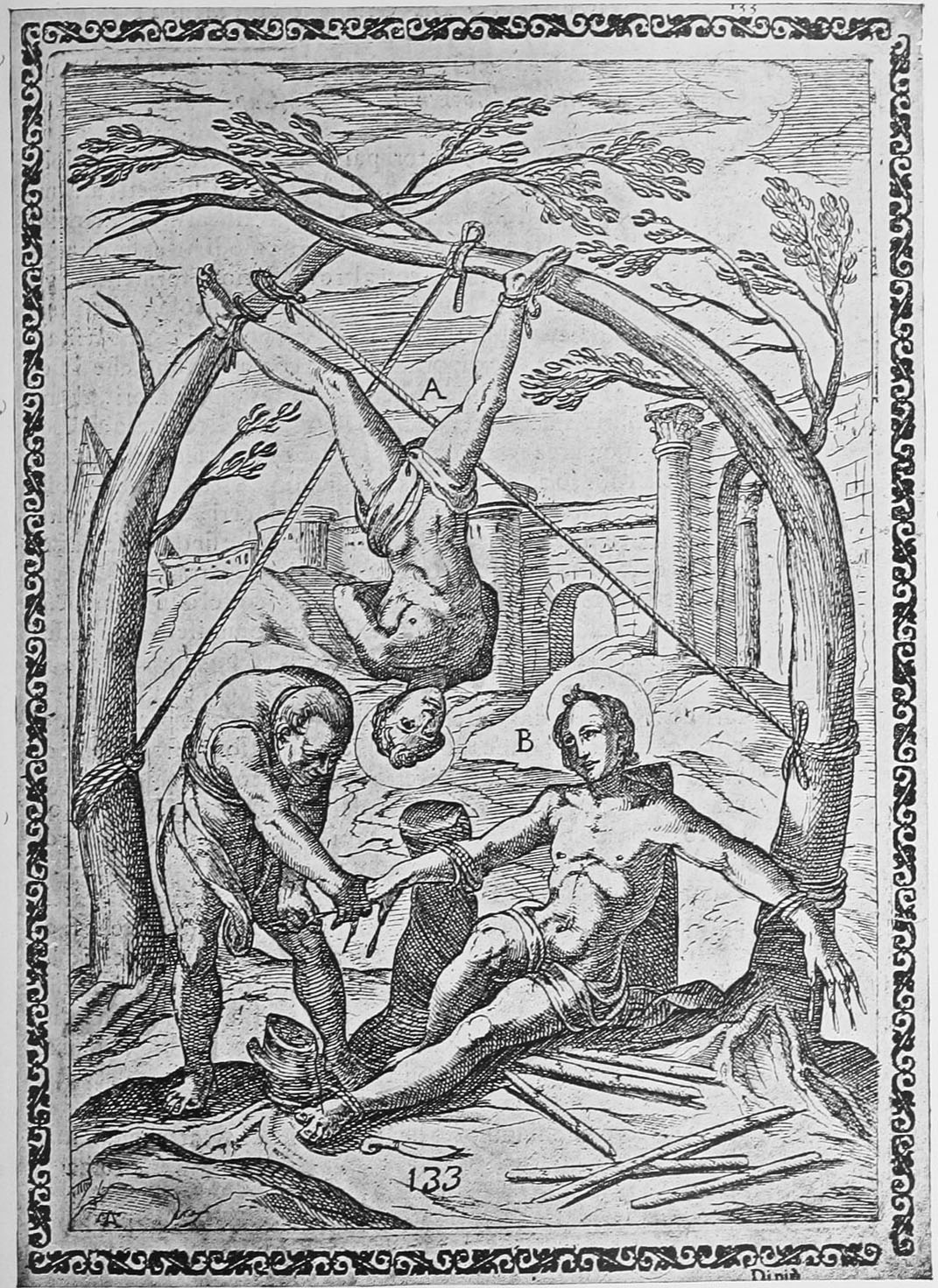
Martyr tied to two trees. Trattato de gli instrumenti di martirio e delle varie maniere di martoriare usate da' gentili contro christiani (Antonio Gallonio, 1591)

Roman military discipline could be extremely severe, and the emperor Aurelian (r. AD 270–275), who had a reputation for extreme strictness, instituted the rule that soldiers who seduced the wives of their hosts should have their legs fastened to two bent-down trees, which were then released, ripping the man in two. Similarly, in an unsuccessful rebellion against the emperor Valens in AD 366, the usurper Procopius met the same fate.

After the defeat of Darius III by Alexander the Great, the Persian empire was thrown into turmoil, and Darius was killed. One man, Bessus, claimed the throne as Artaxerxes V, but in 329 BC, Alexander had him executed. The manner of Bessus' death is disputed, and Waldemar Heckel writes:

The exact details of Bessus' death are disputed. He may have been crucified, or torn apart by recoiling trees, or (what is most likely) mutilated before being sent to Ecbatana for execution.

The method of tying people to bent down trees, which are then allowed to recoil, ripping the individual to pieces in the process is, however, mentioned by several travelers to nineteenth century Persia. The British diplomat James Justinian Morier travelled as a special envoy to the Shah in 1808, and Morier writes the following concerning then-prevailing criminal justice:

... for the King never pardons theft, and orders a convicted thief to be executed instantly. The mode is as follows: two young trees are by main strength brought together at their summits, and there fastened with cords together. The culprit is then brought out, and his legs are tied with ropes, which are again carried up and: fixed to the top of the trees. The cords that force the trees together are then cut; and, in the elasticity and power of this spring, the body of the thief is torn asunder, and left thus to hang divided on each separate tree. The inflexibility of the King in this point has given to the roads a security, which, in former times, was little known.

==== Torn apart by stones ====
An obscure Christian martyr Severianus was, about the year AD 300, martyred in the following way, according to one tale: One stone was fastened to his head, another bound to his feet. His middle was then fastened by a rope to the top of a wall, and the stones released from the height. His body was ripped apart.

== See also ==
- Breaking wheel
- Cannibalism
- Death by sawing
- Decapitation
- Hanged, drawn and quartered
- Slow slicing
- Total body disruption, also known as gross dismemberment
- Waist chop
