= François Ravaillac =

Assassin of King Henry IV of France

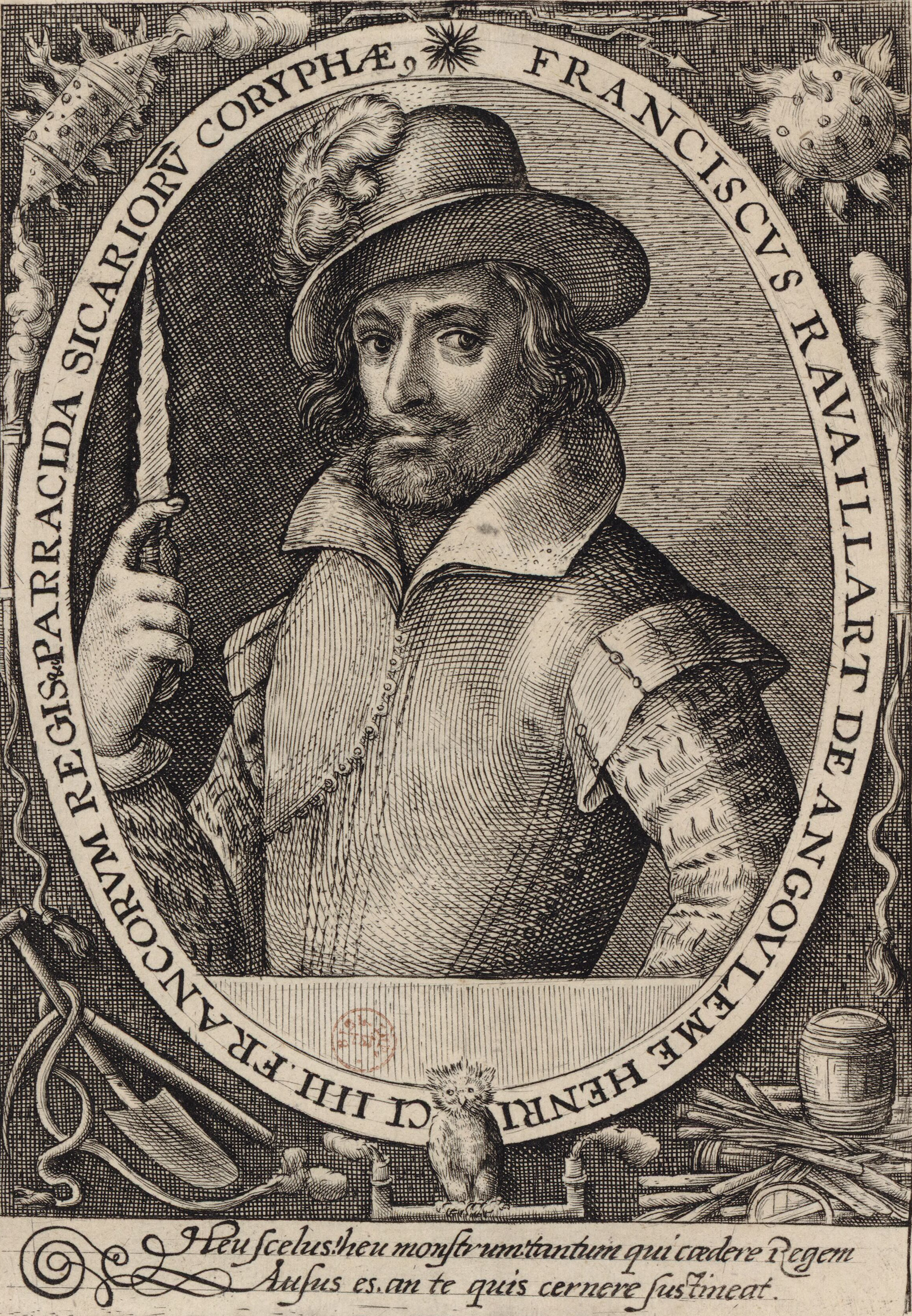
- François Ravaillac brandishing his dagger, in a 17th-century engraving
- Born: 1578; Angoulême, France
- Died: 27 May 1610 (aged 31–32); Paris, France
- Criminal charges: Regicide
- Penalty: Torture and dismemberment

François Ravaillac (French: [fʁɑ̃swa ʁavajak]; 1578 – 27 May 1610) was a French Catholic who assassinated King Henry IV of France in 1610.

== Biography ==
=== Early life and education ===
Ravaillac was born in 1578 at Angoulême to an educated family; his grandfather François Ravaillac was the prosecutor in Angoulême, and two of his maternal uncles were canons of the Angoulême Cathedral. His father Jean Ravaillac was a violent man whose many misdeeds caused a public scandal and led to legal difficulties, while his mother Françoise Dubreuil was known for her Catholic piety. He first began working as a servant, later becoming a school teacher. Obsessed with religion, he sought admission to the ascetic Feuillants order, but after a short probation, he was dismissed for being "prey to visions." An application in 1606 for admission to the Society of Jesus was also unsuccessful.

=== Regicide ===
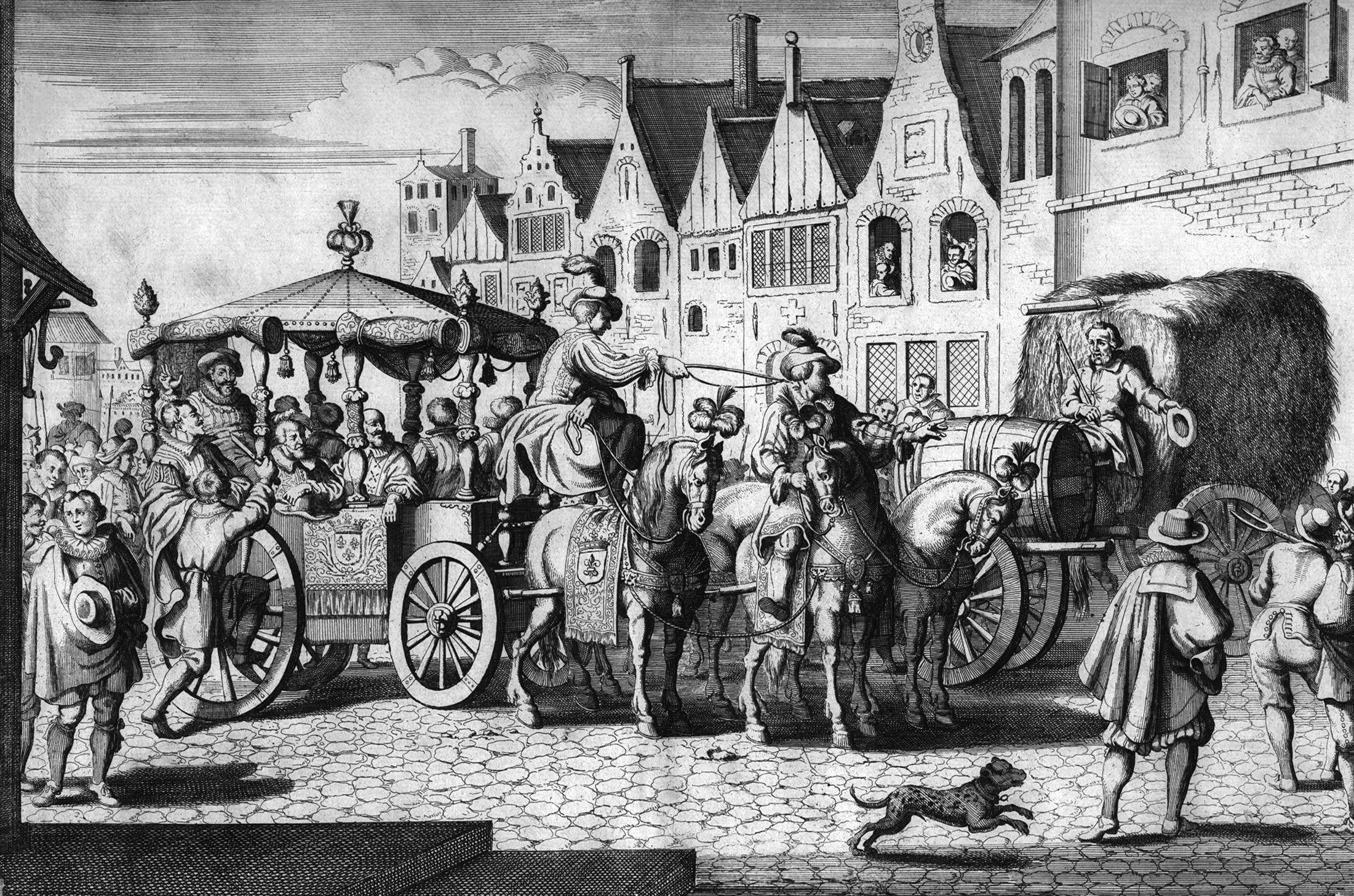
Assassination of Henry IV, engraving by Gaspar Bouttats.

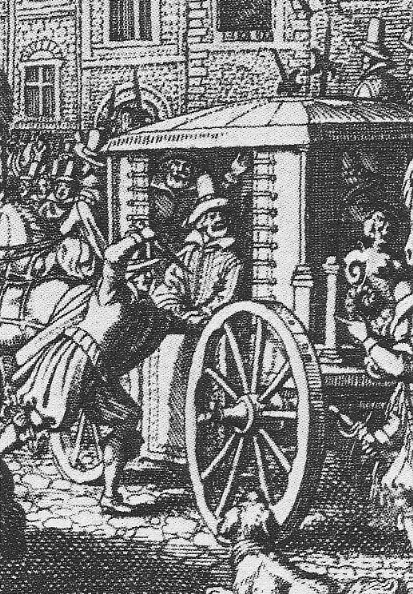
Ravaillac murdering Henry IV, rue de la Ferronnerie in Paris

In 1609, Ravaillac claimed to have experienced a vision instructing him to convince King Henry IV to convert the Huguenots to Catholicism. Between Pentecost 1609 and May 1610, Ravaillac made three separate trips to Paris to tell his vision to the king, and lodged with Charlotte du Tillet, mistress of Jean Louis de Nogaret de La Valette, duc d'Épernon. Unable to meet the king, Ravaillac interpreted Henry's decision to invade the Spanish Netherlands as the start of a war against the Pope. Determined to stop him, he decided to kill the king.

On 14 May 1610, Ravaillac lay in wait on Rue de la Ferronnerie in Paris (now south of the Forum des Halles); when the king passed, his carriage was halted by a blockage in the street, Ravaillac seized his opportunity, climbed into the coach and stabbed Henry to death. Pierre de l'Estoile, the chronicler, stated of the king:

His coach, entering from St Honoré to Ferronnerie Street, was blocked on one side by a cart filled with wine and on the other by a cart filled with hay... Ravaillac climbed on the wheel of the above-named coach and with a knife trenchant on both sides stabbed him between the second and third ribs.

Hercule, Duke of Montbazon, riding with Henry, was wounded in the attack. Ravaillac was immediately seized by police and taken to the Hôtel de Retz to avoid a mob lynching. He was transferred to the Conciergerie.

=== Trial and execution ===
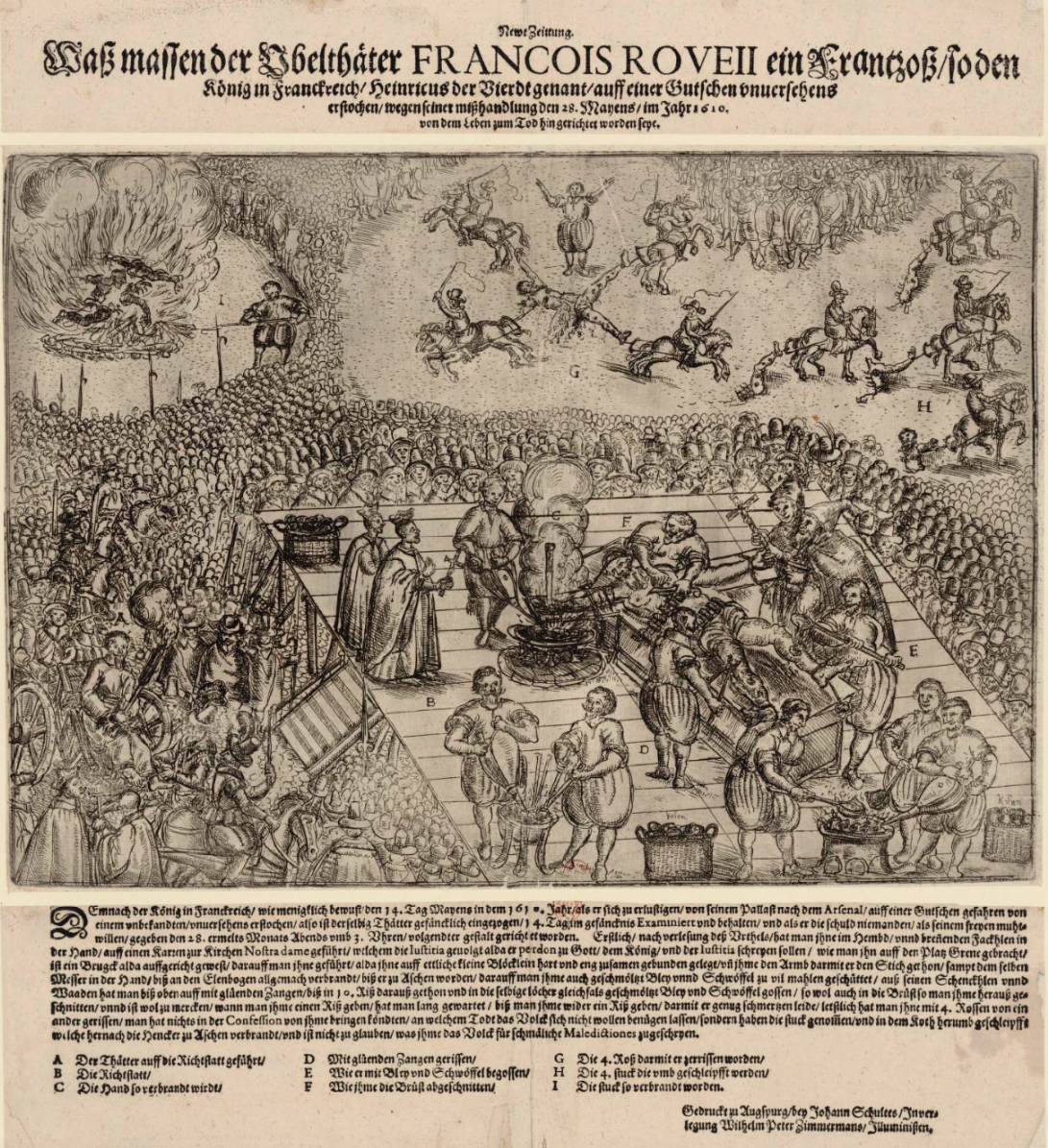
Depiction of the torture and execution of Ravaillac

During interrogation, Ravaillac was frequently tortured to make him identify accomplices, but he denied that he had any and insisted that he had acted alone. His knowledge of the king's route and the blockage of traffic that put the king within reach excited speculation. The king was on his way to visit Maximilien de Béthune, who lay ill in the Arsenal; his purpose was to make final preparations for imminent military intervention in the War of the Jülich Succession after the death of Duke John William. Intervention on behalf of a Calvinist candidate would have brought France into conflict with the Catholic Habsburg dynasty. Ravaillac seems to have learned of the plans; in his tortured mind, "he had seen that the king wanted to make war on the Pope, in order to transfer the Holy See to Paris".

At the start of the interrogation, Ravaillac said;

"I know very well he is dead; I saw the blood on my knife and the place where I hit him. But I have no regrets at all about dying, because I've done what I came to do."

On May 27 he was taken to the Place de Grève in Paris and was tortured one last time before being pulled apart by four horses, a method of execution reserved for regicides. Alistair Horne describes the torture Ravaillac suffered:

"Before being drawn and quartered... he was scalded with burning sulphur, molten lead and boiling oil and resin, his flesh then being torn by pincers."

Following his execution, Ravaillac's parents were forced into exile, and the rest of his family was ordered never to use the name "Ravaillac" again.

In January 1611, Jacqueline d'Escoman, who had known Ravaillac, denounced Jean Louis de Nogaret as the one responsible for the death of Henry IV; she was jailed for the rest of her life. Philippe Erlanger, in his book L'Étrange Mort de Henri IV (1957, rev. 1999), reveals Épernon's association with Ravaillac through his mistress. He concludes that Ravaillac, the King's mistress Henriette d'Entragues and Charlotte du Tillet planned the assassination. The contrary view, that Ravaillac had no accomplices but his confessors in the church, is expressed by Roland Mousnier in L'Assassinat d'Henri IV: 14 mai 1610 (Paris, 1964).

In later ages, Ravaillac was perceived as an evil figure. While only a few Catholics viewed him as a hero, atheist Jean Meslier praised him.

== See also ==
- Jacques Clément, who assassinated King Henry III of France in 1589.
- Jean Châtel, who attempted to assassinate King Henry IV of France in 1595.
- Michael Piekarski, who, inspired by Ravaillac, attempted to assassinate Sigismund III Vasa of Poland in 1620.
- Robert-François Damiens, who attempted to assassinate King Louis XV of France in 1757.
