= Rue de la Ferronnerie =

Street in Paris, France

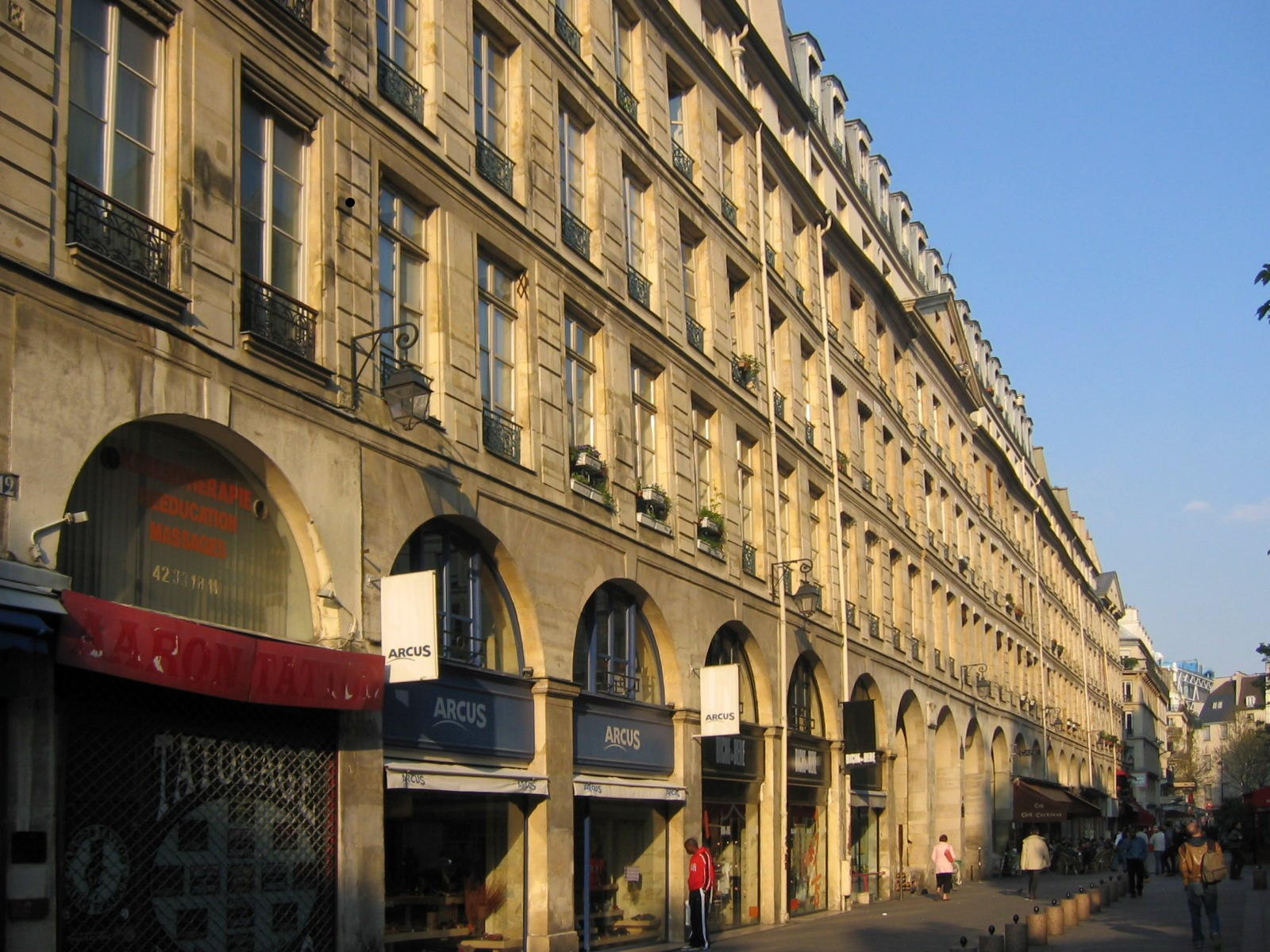

- Location within Paris
- Length: 114 m (374 ft)
- Width: 16.6 m (54 ft)
- Arrondissement: 1st
- Quarter: Les Halles
- Coordinates: 48.860238°N 2.347747°E

Construction
- Completion: Before 1229
- Denomination: 1229

The Rue de la Ferronnerie (French pronunciation: [ʁy də la fɛʁɔnʁi]) is a street in the 1st arrondissement of Paris, in the Les Halles area.

== History ==
Before 1229, the name of the street was Rue de la Charronnerie (or des Charrons). The street acquired its current name in 1229.

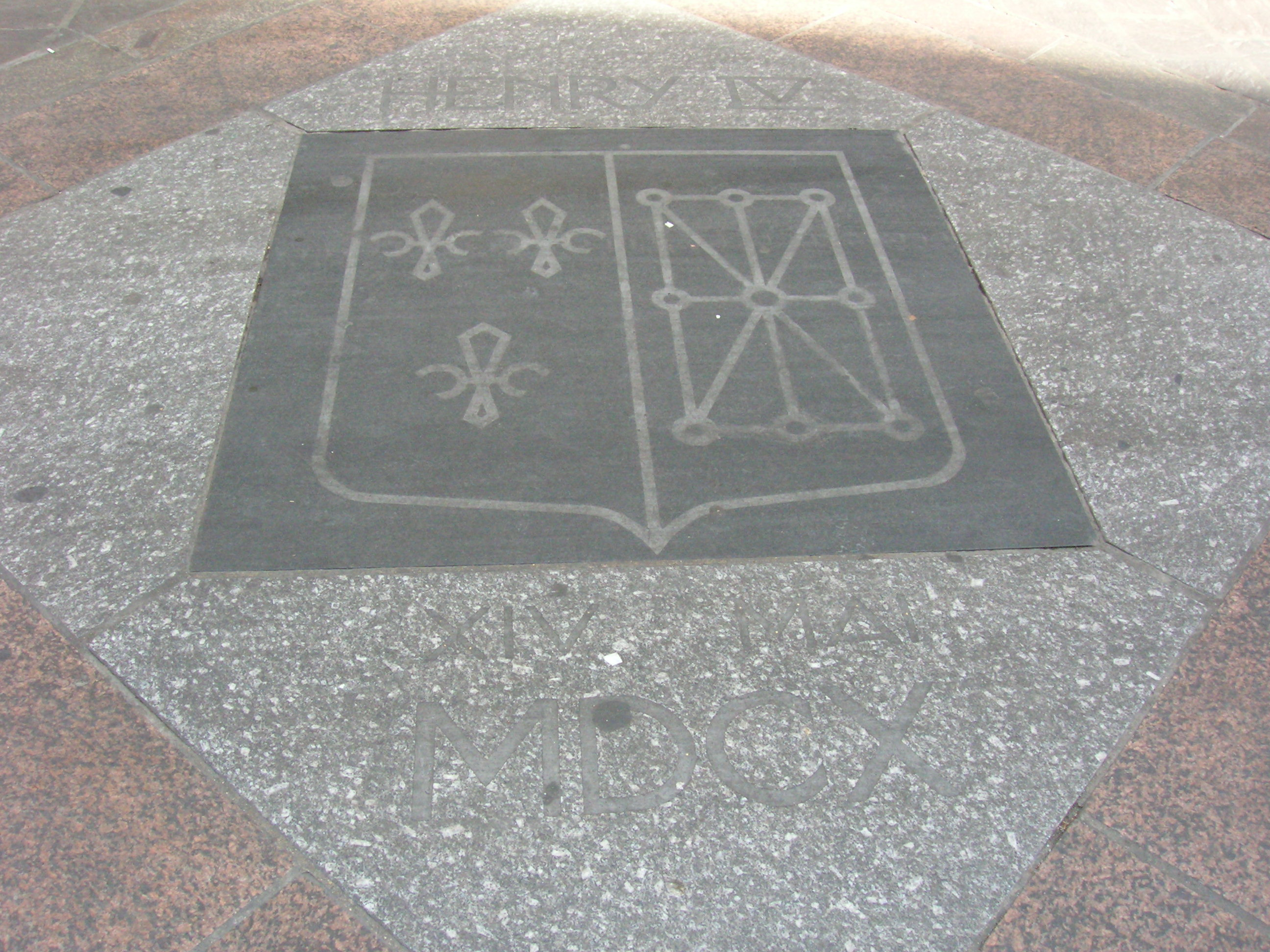
Marking on the street showing where the assassination of Henry IV took place

Henry IV of France was assassinated by Ravaillac on May 14, 1610 A marking on the street at no. 11 shows where the event took place.

One of the longest buildings in Paris is located on 2-4-6-8-10-12-14 rue de la Ferronnerie. The building was constructed between 1669 and 1678.
