= History of Paris =

The History of Paris Summed Up by Everything Below
Era/Time	Year(s)	Parisian Events
Mesolithic Era	ca. 8000 BC	First traces of human occupation in Paris.
Settlement	ca. 250-225 BC	The Parisii settled on the banks of the Seine.
Roman Invasion	ca. 52 BC	A Roman army led by Titus Labienus defeats the Parisii and establishs Lutetia.
Christianisation	ca. 200 AD	Paris was Christianised.
The Franks Capital	508 AD	Paris was made the capital of the Franks.
Founding of First Universities	ca. 1250	The University of Paris was founded, being one of Europe's oldest universities.
Bubonic Plague	ca. 1400	The Bubonic Plague strikes Paris.
Occupation	1418-1436	The Burgundians and English occupy Paris.
Hundred's Year War	ca. 1500	The Bubonic Plague strikes again.
French Revolution	1789	The French revolt against the monarchy.
Napoleon	ca. 1800	Napoleon brought Paris to glory.
Rebuilding	1852-1870	The French rebuild the center of Paris.
Highest Pop.	1921	Paris hit a high of 2.1 million residents, then declined.
Occupation II	1940-1944	France is occupied by Germany during the Third Reich.
Modern Paris	1970-Present	France is in her modern time.

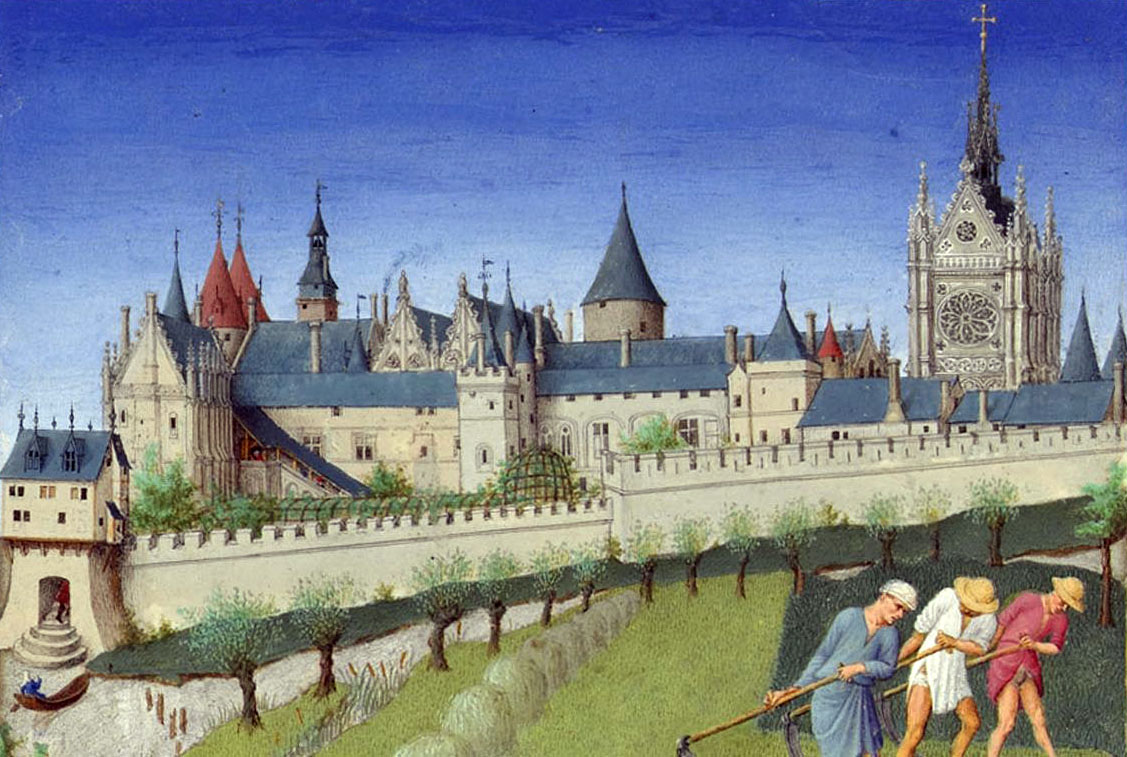
The Palais de la Cité and Sainte-Chapelle as viewed from the Left Bank, from the Très Riches Heures du duc de Berry (1410), month of June

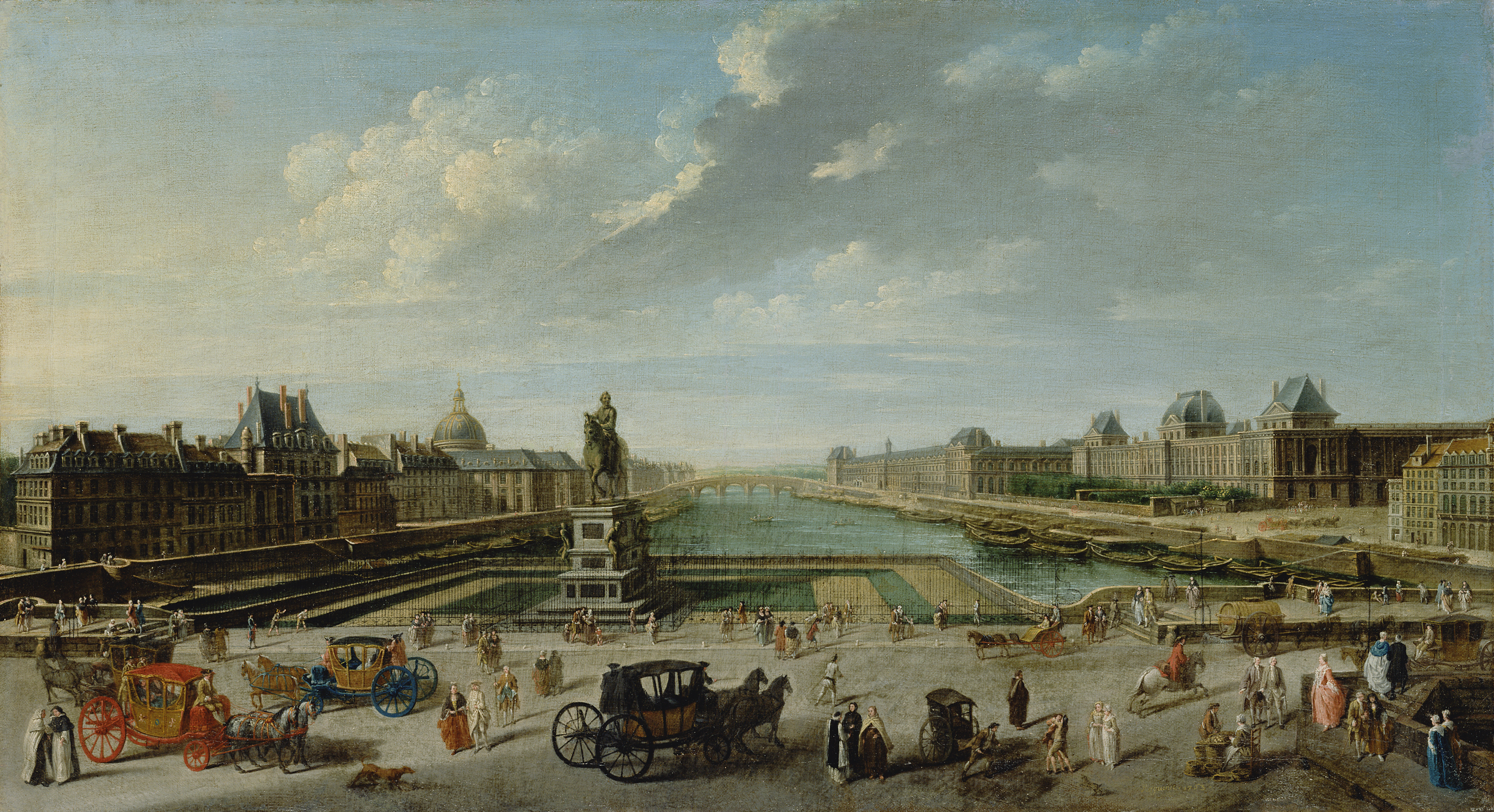
Paris in 1763, by Nicolas-Jean-Baptiste Raguenet, A View of Paris from the Pont Neuf, Getty Museum

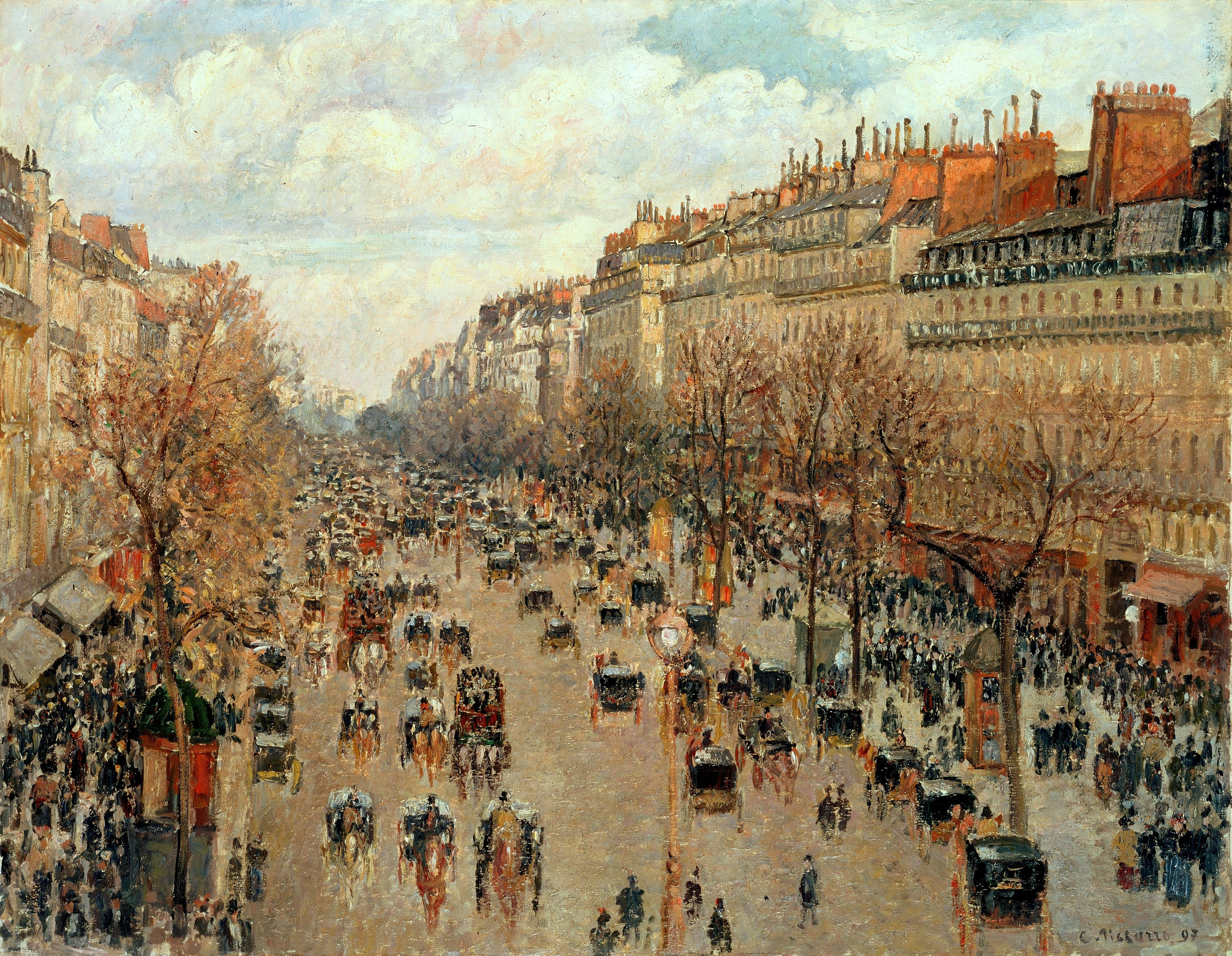
Paris in 1897 - Boulevard Montmartre, by Camille Pissarro, Hermitage Museum, Saint Petersburg, Russia

== Introduction ==
Historical affiliations

Gaul Before 52 BCE
Roman Republic 52–27 BC
Roman Empire 27 BC–AD 395
Western Roman Empire 395–476
Kingdom of Soissons 476–486
Francia 486–843
West Francia 843–987
Kingdom of France 987–1792
French First Republic 1792–1804
First French Empire 1804–1814
Kingdom of France 1814–1815
First French Empire 1815
Kingdom of France 1815–1830
July Monarchy 1830–1848
French Second Republic 1848–1852
Second French Empire 1852–1870
French Third Republic 1870–1871
Paris Commune 1871
French Third Republic 1871-1940
(Vichy France) Vichy France1940-1944
Provisional Government of the French Republic 1944–1946
French Fourth Republic 1946–1958
French Fifth Republic 1958–present

- The oldest traces of human occupation in Paris date from about 8000 BC, during the Mesolithic period. Between 250 and 225 BC, the Parisii settled on the banks of the Seine, built bridges and a fort, minted coins, and began to trade with other river settlements in Europe. In 52 BC, a Roman army led by Titus Labienus defeated the Parisii and established a Gallo-Roman garrison town called Lutetia. The town was Christianised in the 3rd century AD, and after the collapse of the Roman Empire, it was occupied by Clovis I, the King of the Franks, who made it his capital in 508.

During the Middle Ages, Paris was the largest city in Europe, an important religious and commercial centre, and the birthplace of the Gothic style of architecture. The University of Paris on the Left Bank, organised in the mid-13th century, was one of the first in Europe. It suffered from the Bubonic Plague in the 14th century and the Hundred Years' War in the 15th century, with recurrence of the plague. Between 1418 and 1436, the city was occupied by the Burgundians and English.

== The French War of Religion and Enlightenment ==
In the 16th century, Paris became the book-publishing capital of Europe, though it was shaken by the French Wars of Religion between Catholics and Protestants. In the 18th century, Paris was the centre of the intellectual ferment known as the Enlightenment, and the main stage of the French Revolution from 1789. In the 19th century, Napoleon embellished the city with monuments to military glory. It became the European capital of fashion and the scene of two more revolutions (in 1830 and 1848).

The centre of Paris was rebuilt between 1852 and 1870 with wide new avenues, squares and new parks, and the city was expanded to its present limits in 1860. In the latter part of the century, millions of tourists came to see the Paris International Expositions and the new Eiffel Tower.

== History of Population ==
In the 20th century, Paris suffered bombardment in World War I and German occupation from 1940 until 1944 in World War II. Between the two wars, Paris was the capital of modern art and a magnet for intellectuals, writers and artists from around the world. The population reached its historic high of 2.1 million in 1921, but declined for the rest of the century. New museums (The Centre Pompidou, Musée Marmottan Monet and Musée d'Orsay) were opened, and the Louvre given its glass pyramid. In the 21st century, Paris added new museums and a new concert hall, but in 2005 it also experienced violent unrest in the housing projects in the surrounding banlieues (suburbs), inhabited largely by immigrants from France's former colonies in the Maghreb and Sub-Saharan Africa. In 2015, two deadly terrorist attacks were carried out by Islamic extremists. The population of the city declined steadily from 1921 until 2004, due to a decrease in family size and an exodus of the middle class to the suburbs; but it is increasing slowly once again, as young people and immigrants move into the city.

== Prehistory ==
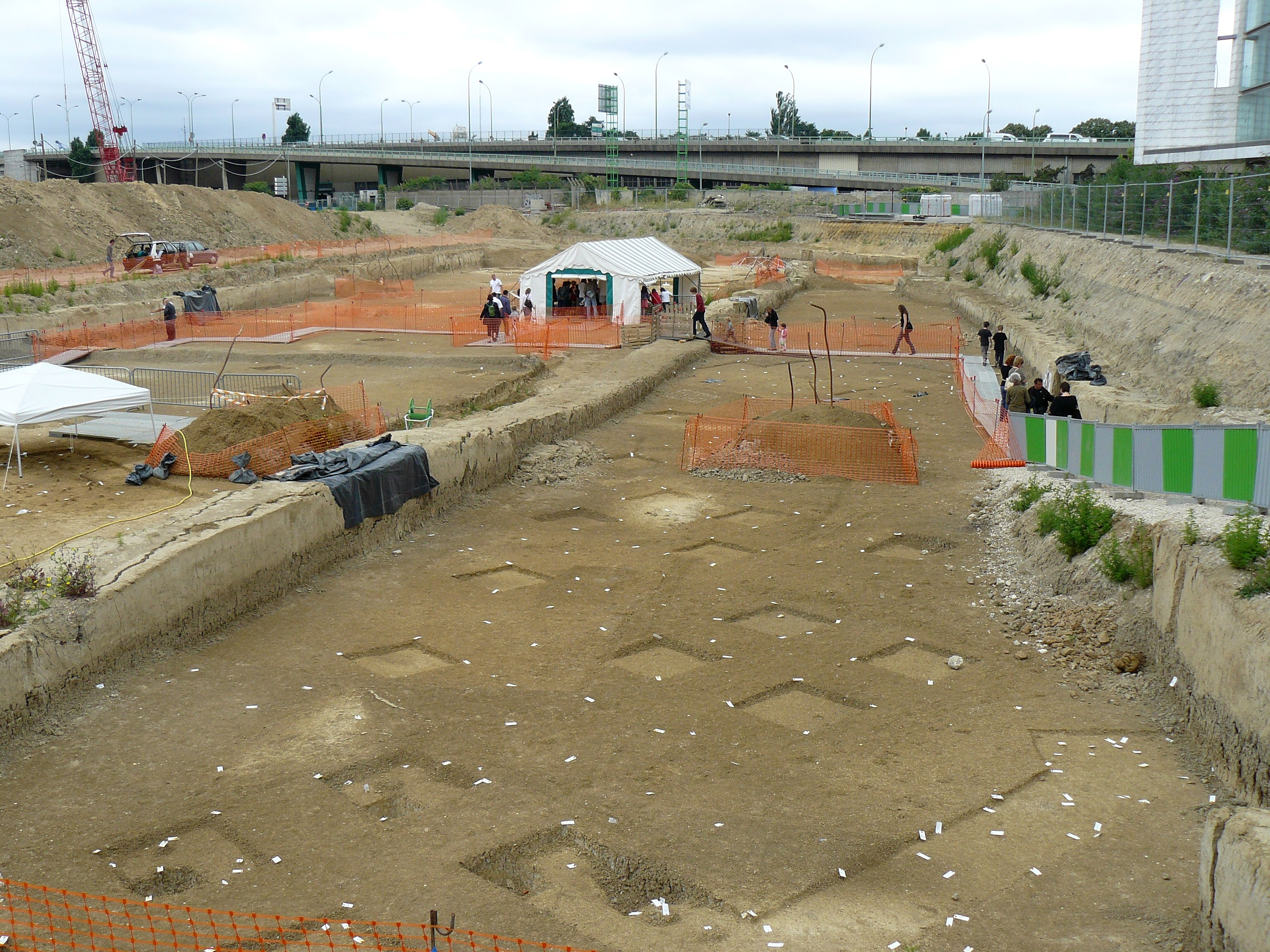
Site of the National Institute for Preventive Archaeological Research (INRAP) digging at the Rue Henri-Farman (15th arrondissement) in June 2008

In 2008, archaeologists of the National Institute for Preventive Archaeological Research (INRAP) digging in the 15th arrondissement, not far from the Left Bank of the Seine, discovered the oldest human (found as of the time of this writing) remains and traces of a hunter-gatherer settlement in Paris, dating to about 8000 BC, during the Mesolithic period.

Other more recent traces of temporary settlements had been found at Bercy in 1991, dating from around 4500–4200 BC. The excavations at Bercy found the fragments of three wooden canoes used by fishermen on the Seine, the oldest dating to 4800–4300 BC. They are now on display at the Carnavalet Museum. Excavations at the 15th arrondissement site found traces of settlements from the middle Neolithic period (4200–3500 BC); the early Bronze Age (3500–1500 BC); and the first Iron Age (800–500 BC). Hatchets made in eastern Europe were found at the Neolithic site in Bercy, showing that first Parisians were already trading with other parts of Europe.

== Parisii and the Roman conquest (250–52 BC) ==
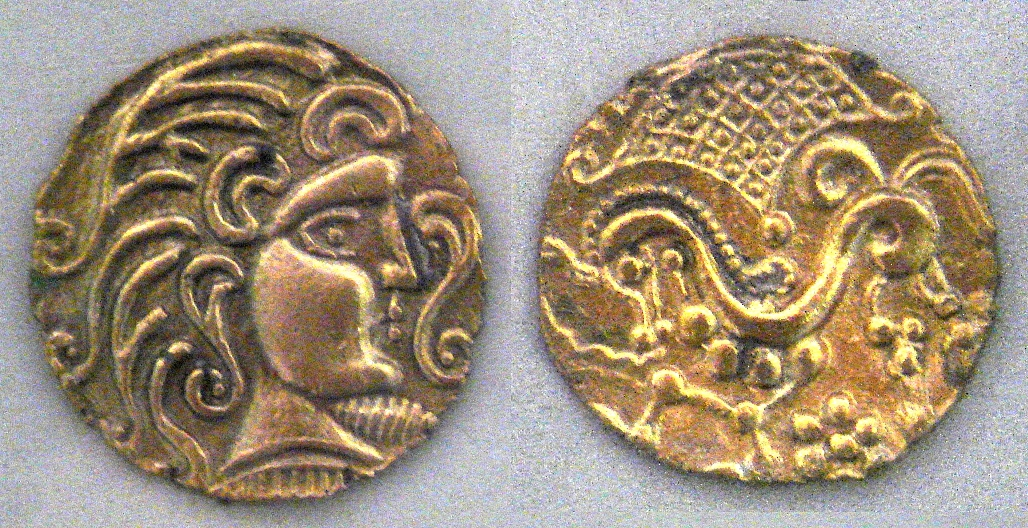
Gold coins minted by the Parisii (1st century BC)

Between 250 and 225 BC, during the Iron Age, the Parisii settled on the banks of the Seine. At the beginning of the 2nd century BC, they built an oppidum, a walled fort, whose location is disputed. It may have been on the Île de la Cité, where bridges of an important trading route crossed the Seine. In his account of the Gallic Wars, Julius Caesar recorded meeting with the leaders of the Parisii on an island in the Seine. Other historians cite an absence of traces of an early Gallic settlement on the island, and believe the oppidum was actually in Nanterre, in the Paris suburbs, where vestiges of a large settlement were discovered during construction of a highway in the 1980s.

The settlement was called "Lucotocia" (according to the ancient Greek geographer Strabo) or "Leucotecia" (according to Roman geographer Ptolemy), and may have taken its name from the Celtic word lugo or luco, for a marsh or swamp. It had a strategic position on the main trade route, via the Seine and Rhône rivers, between Britain and to the Roman colony of Provence and the Mediterranean Sea. The location and the fees for crossing the bridge and passing along the river made the town prosperous, so much so that it was able to mint its own gold coins.

Julius Caesar and his Roman army campaigned in Gaul between 58 and 53 BC under the pretext of protecting the territory from Germanic invaders, but in reality to conquer it and annex it to the Roman Republic. The Parisii formed a secret alliance with the other Gallic tribes, under the leadership of Vercingetorix, and launched an uprising against the Romans in January 52 BC. The Parisii fought bravely and desperately in what became known as the Battle of Lutetia. The Commander of the Parisii, Camulogene, was killed and his soldiers were cut down by the disciplined Romans. Despite the defeat, the Parisii continued to resist the Romans. They sent eight thousand men to fight with Vercingetorix in his last stand against the Romans at the Battle of Alesia.

== Roman Lutetia (52 BC – AD 486) ==
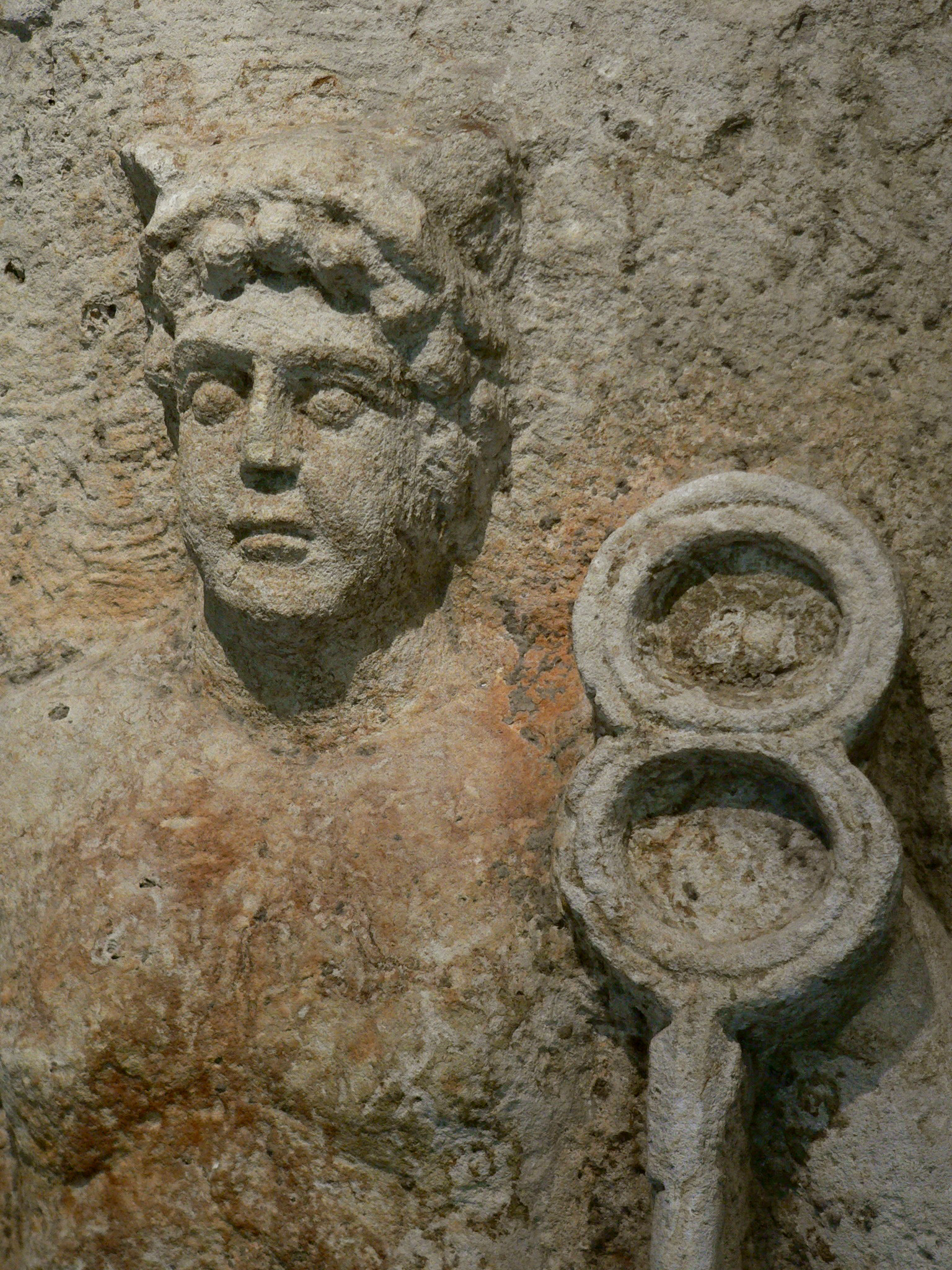
A Gallo-Roman stele of Mercury, from Lutetia. The people of Lutetia worshipped both Roman and Celtic gods. (Carnavalet Museum)

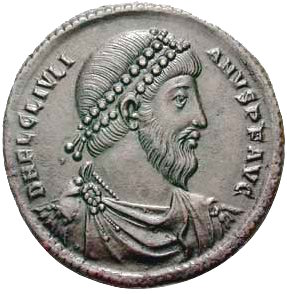
Julian the Apostate was crowned Roman Emperor in the Thermes de Cluny in AD 360. He tried unsuccessfully to roll back the Germanic invasions and the spread of Christianity.

The Romans built an entirely new city as a base for their soldiers and the Gallic auxiliaries intended to keep an eye on the rebellious province. The new city was called Lutetia (Lutèce) or "Lutetia Parisiorum" ("Lutèce of the Parisii"), probably from the Latin word luta, meaning mud or swamp. The major part of the city was on the left bank of the Seine, which was higher and less prone to flood. It was laid out following the traditional Roman town design along a north–south axis.

The city was centered on the forum atop the Montagne Sainte-Geneviève. The main building of the forum was one hundred meters long and contained a temple, a basilica used for civic functions and a square portico which covered shops. Nearby was an enormous amphitheatre built in the 1st century AD, which could seat ten to fifteen thousand spectators, though the population of the city was only six to eight thousand. Fresh drinking water was supplied to the city by an aqueduct sixteen kilometres long from the basin of Rungis and Wissous. The aqueduct also supplied water to the famous baths, or Thermes de Cluny, built near the forum at the end of the 2nd century or beginning of the 3rd century. Under Roman rule, the town was thoroughly Romanised and grew considerably.

Besides the Roman architecture and city design, the newcomers imported Roman cuisine: modern excavations have found amphorae of Italian wine and olive oil, shellfish, and a popular Roman sauce called garum. Despite its commercial importance, Lutetia was only a medium-sized Roman city, considerably smaller than Lugdunum (Lyon) or Agedincum (Sens), which was the capital of the Roman province of Lugdunensis Quarta, in which Lutetia was located.

Christianity was introduced into Paris in the middle of the 3rd century AD. According to tradition, it was brought by Saint Denis, the Bishop of the Parisii, who was beheaded on Mount Mercury when he refused to renounce his faith. According to the tradition, Saint Denis picked up his head and carried it to a secret Christian cemetery of Vicus Cattulliacus about six miles away. A different version of the legend says that a devout Christian woman, Catula, came at night to the site of the execution and took his remains to the cemetery. The hill where he was executed, Mount Mercury, later became the Mountain of Martyrs ("Mons Martyrum"), eventually Montmartre. A church was built on the site of the grave of St. Denis, which later became the Basilica of Saint-Denis. By the 4th century, the city had its first recognized bishop, Victorinus (346). By 392, it had a cathedral.

Late in the 3rd century AD, the invasion of Germanic tribes, beginning with the Alamans in 275, caused many of the residents of the Left Bank to leave that part of the city and move to the safety of the Île de la Cité. Many of the monuments on the Left Bank were abandoned, and the stones used to build a wall around the Île de la Cité, the first city wall of Paris. A new basilica and baths were built on the island; their ruins were found beneath the square in front of the cathedral of Notre Dame. Beginning in 305, the name Lutetia was replaced on milestones by Civitas Parisiorum, or "City of the Parisii". By the period of the Late Roman Empire (the 3rd–5th centuries AD), it was known simply as "Parisius" in Latin and "Paris" in French.

From 355 until 360, Paris was ruled by Julian, the nephew of Constantine the Great and the Caesar, or governor, of the western Roman provinces. When he was not campaigning with the army, he spent the winters of 357-358 and 358–359 in the city living in a palace on the site of the modern Palais de Justice. In February 360, his soldiers proclaimed him Augustus, or Emperor, and for a brief time, Paris was the capital of the western Roman Empire, until he left in 363 and died fighting the Persians. Two other emperors spent winters in the city near the end of the Roman Empire while trying to halt the tide of Barbarian invasions: Valentinian I (365–367) and Gratian in 383.

The gradual collapse of the Roman empire due to the increasing Germanic invasions of the 5th century, sent the city into a period of decline. In 451, the city was threatened by the army of Attila the Hun. The Parisians were planning to abandon the city, but they were persuaded to resist by Saint Geneviève. Attila bypassed Paris and attacked Orléans. In 461, the city was threatened again by the Salian Franks led by Childeric I. The siege of the city lasted ten years. Once again, Geneviève organized the defense. She rescued the city by bringing wheat to the hungry city from Brie and Champagne. She became the patron saint of Paris shortly after her death.

The Franks, a Germanic-speaking tribe, moved into northern Gaul as Roman influence declined. Frankish leaders were influenced by Rome; some even fought with Rome to defeat Atilla the Hun. The Franks worshipped the German gods such as Thor. Frankish laws and customs became the basis of French law and customs.

Latin was no longer the language of everyday speech. The Franks became more politically influential and built up a large army. In 481, the son of Childeric, Clovis I, just sixteen years old, became the new ruler of the Franks. In 486, he defeated the last Roman armies, became the ruler of all of Gaul north of the river Loire and entered Paris. Clovis helped to drive the Visigoths out of Gaul. He was a king with no fixed capital and no central administration beyond his entourage. By deciding to be interred at Paris, Clovis gave the city symbolic weight. When his grandchildren divided royal power 50 years after his death in 511, Paris was kept as a joint property and a fixed symbol of the dynasty.

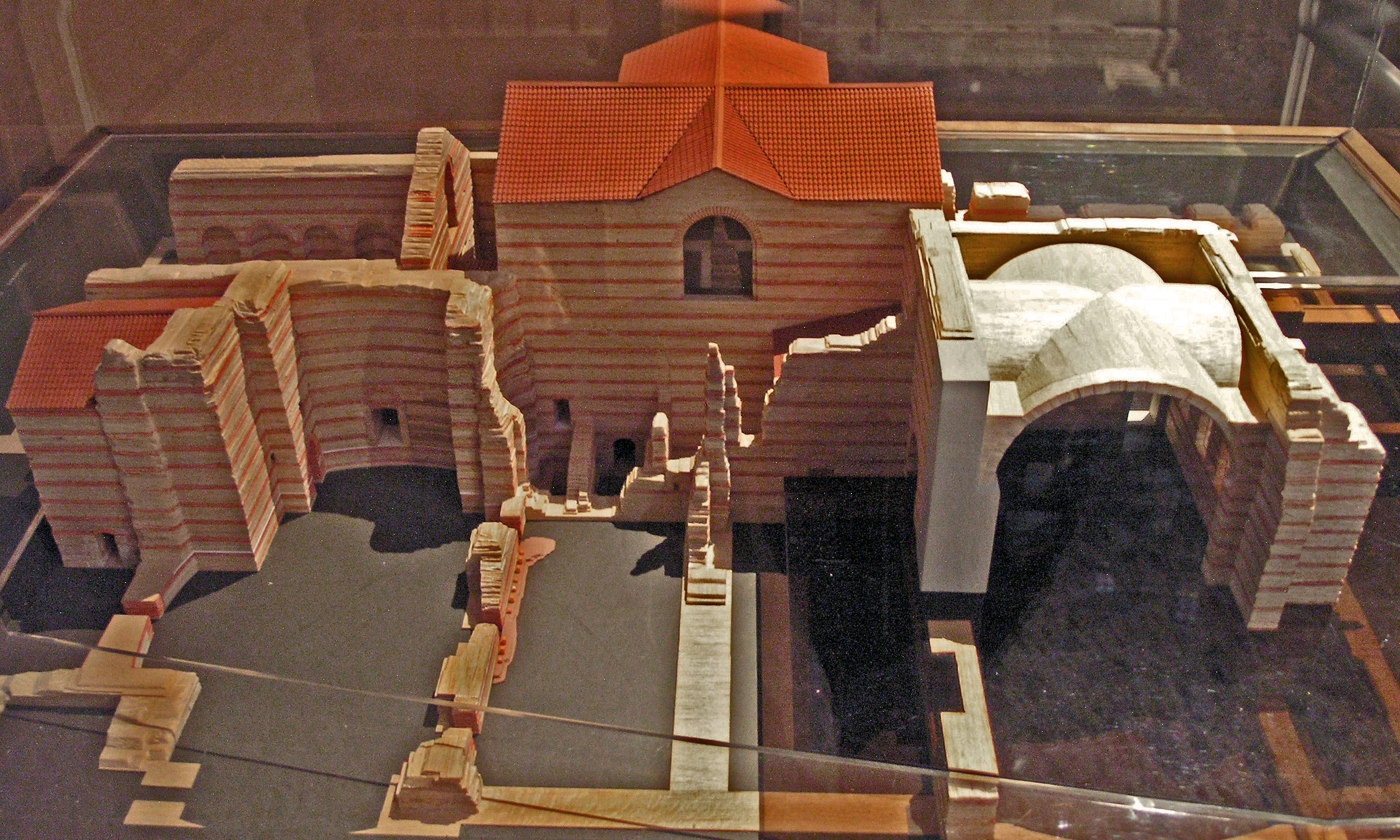
A model of the Thermes de Cluny, the Roman baths

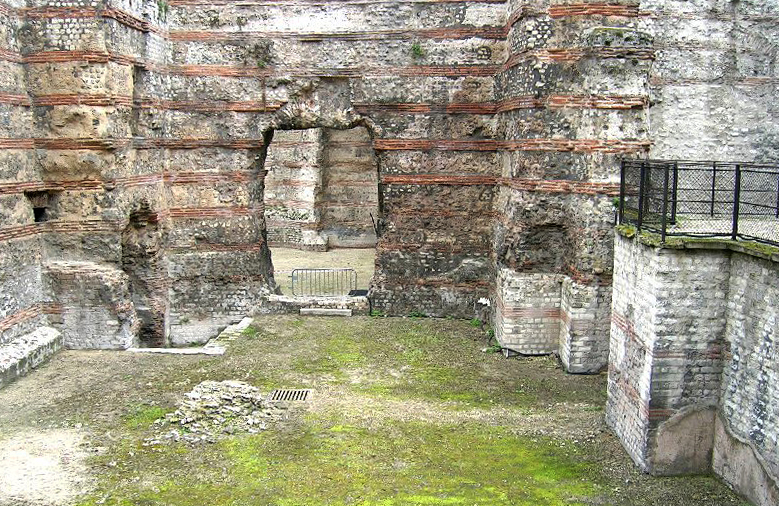
The Roman baths today, now part of the Cluny Museum

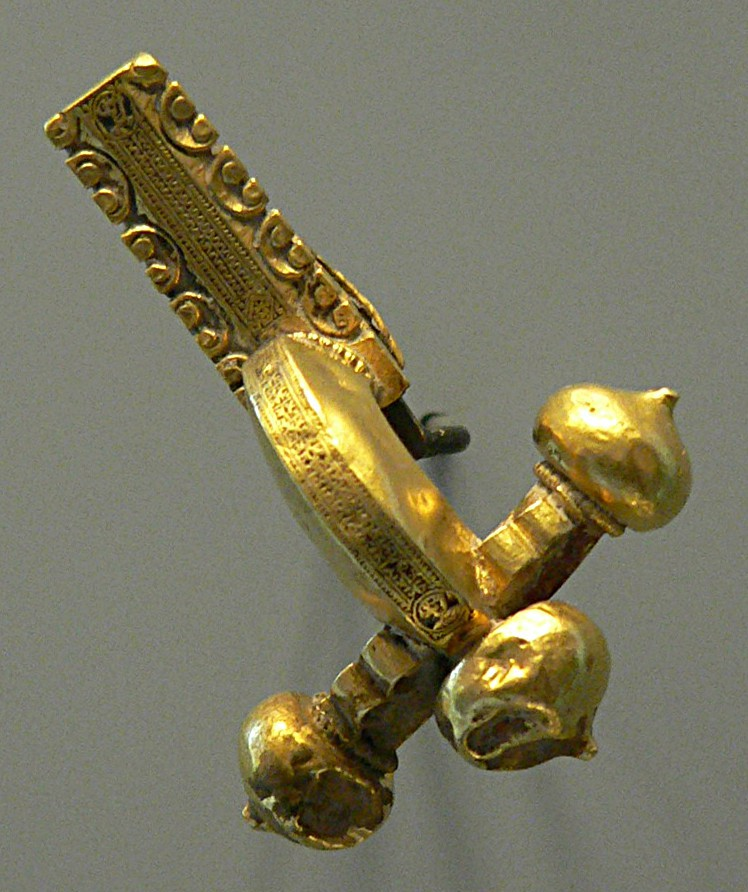
A Gallo-Roman toga clasp from the late 4th century. Lutetia was famous for its jewelers and craftsmen.

== From Clovis to the Capetian kings (6th–11th centuries) ==
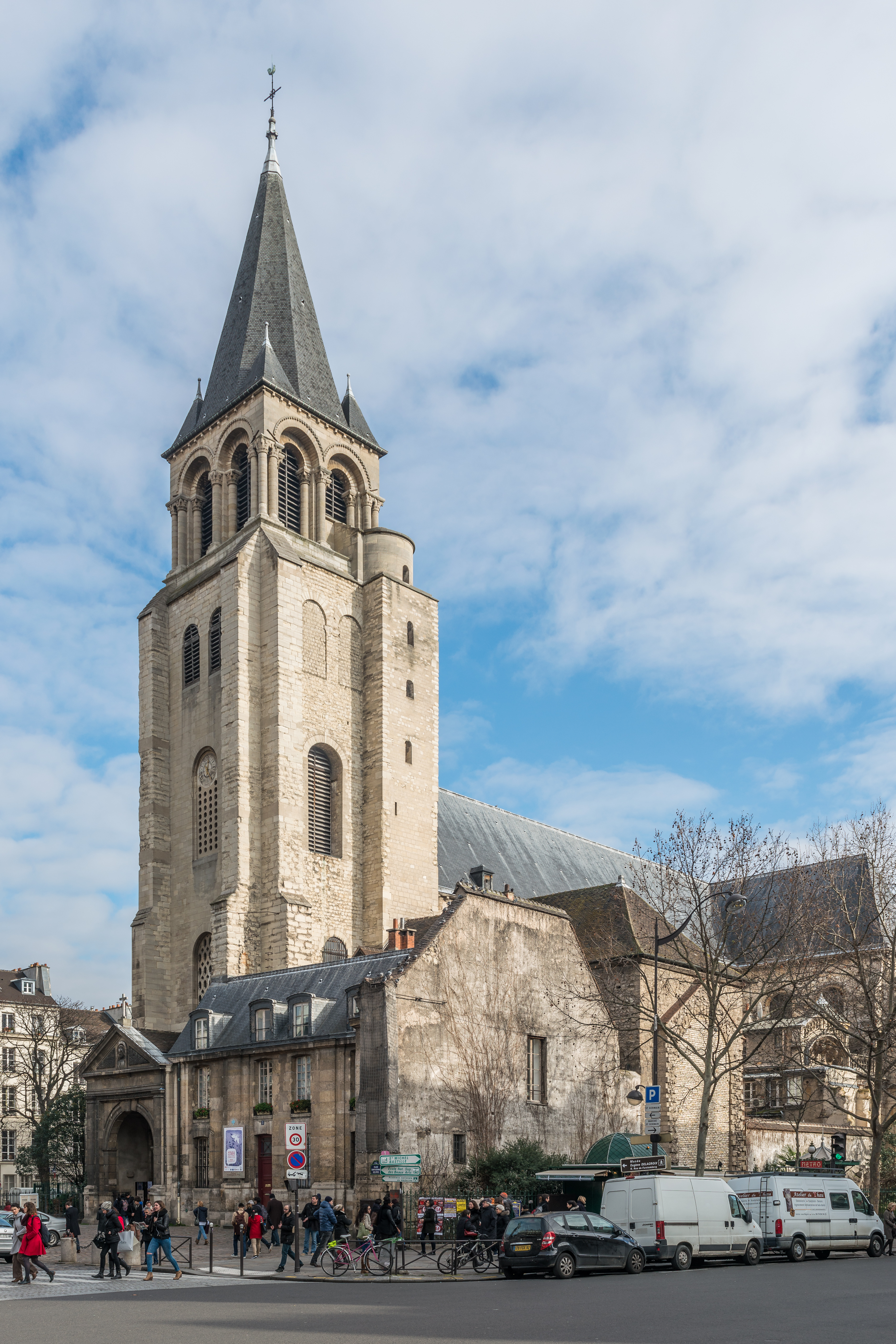
The Church of the Abbaye de Saint-Germain-des-Prés (Late 11th century) was the burial place of the first Kings of France.

Clovis I and his successors of the Merovingian dynasty built a host of religious edifices in Paris, including a basilica on the Montagne Sainte-Geneviève, the cathedral of Saint-Étienne (where Notre Dame now stands), and several important monasteries, including one that later became the Abbey of Saint-Germain-des-Prés. They also built the Basilica of Saint-Denis, which became the necropolis of the kings of France. None of the Merovingian buildings survived, but there are four marble Merovingian columns in the church of Saint-Pierre de Montmartre. The kings of the Merovingian dynasty were buried in the Abbey of Saint-Germain-des Prés, however Dagobert I, the last king of the Merovingian dynasty, who died in 639, was the first Frankish king to be buried in the Basilica of Saint-Denis.

The kings of the Carolingian dynasty, who came to power in 751, moved the Frankish capital to Aix-la-Chapelle (Aachen) and paid little attention to Paris, though King Pepin the Short did build an impressive new sanctuary at Saint-Denis, which was consecrated in the presence of Charlemagne on 24 February 775.

In the 9th century, the city was repeatedly attacked by the Vikings, who sailed up the Seine on fleets of Viking ships. They demanded a ransom and ravaged the fields. In December 856, Vikings attacked and burned Paris. According to the Royal Frankish Annals, they burned all the churches of Paris with the exception of St. Germain-des-Prés, the Cathedral of St. Stephen, the Church of St. Vincent and St. Denis, which were spared due to a payment of ransom. In 885–886, they laid a one-year siege to Paris and tried again in 887 and in 889, but were unable to conquer the city, as it was protected by the Seine and the walls of the Île de la Cité. The two bridges, vital to the city, were additionally protected by two massive stone fortresses, the Grand Châtelet on the Right Bank and the "Petit Châtelet" on the Left Bank, built on the initiative of Joscelin, the bishop of Paris.

In the fall of 978, Paris was besieged by the Emperor Otto II during the Franco-German war of 978–980. At the end of the 10th century, a new dynasty of kings, the Capetians, founded by Hugh Capet in 987, came to power. Though they spent little time in the city, they restored the royal palace on the Île de la Cité and built a church where the Sainte-Chapelle stands today. Prosperity returned gradually to the city and the Right Bank began to be populated. On the Left Bank, the Capetians founded an important monastery: the Abbey of Saint-Germain-des-Prés. Its church was rebuilt in the 11th century.

== Middle Ages (12th–15th centuries) ==
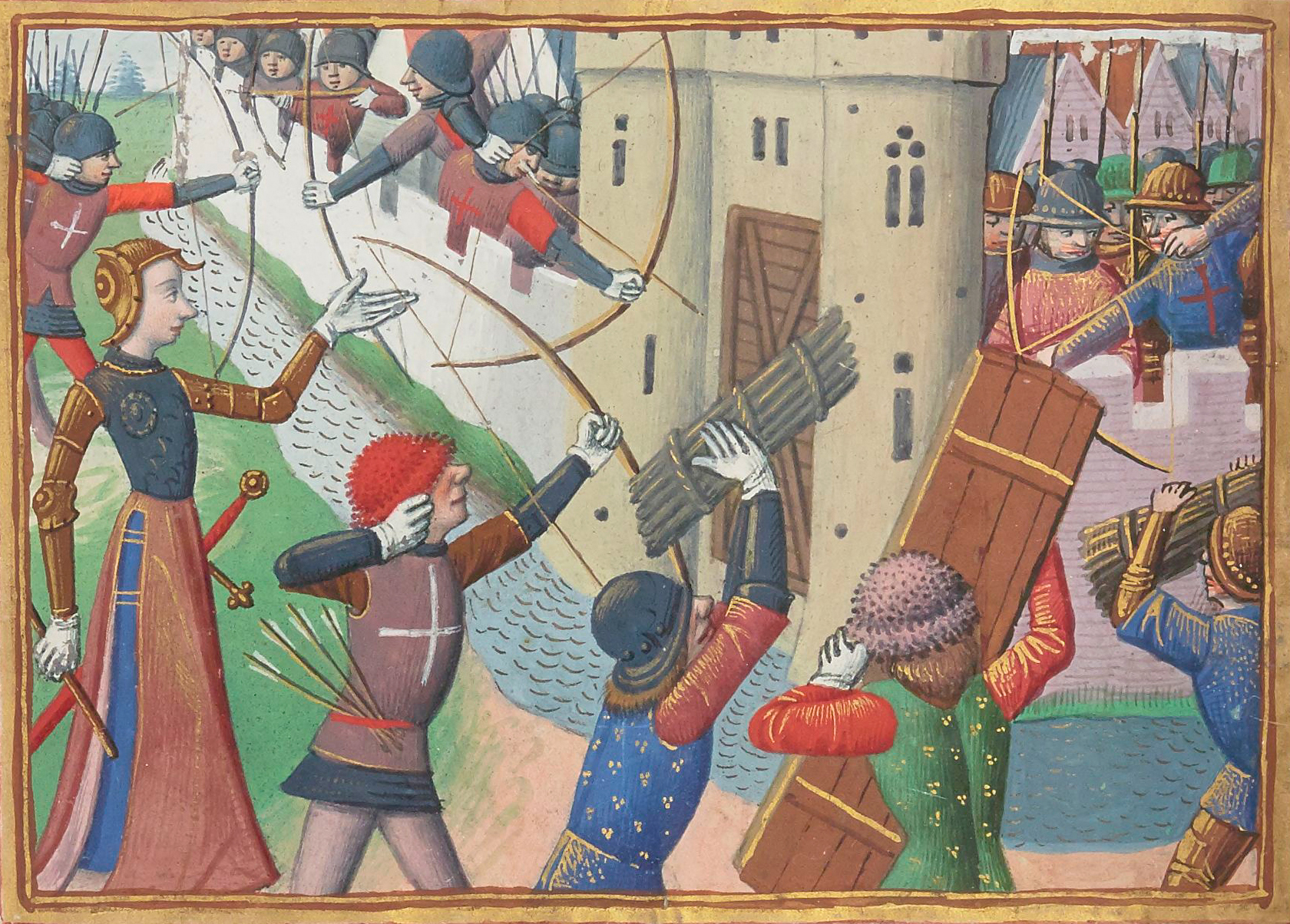
Joan of Arc tries unsuccessfully to liberate Paris (1429).

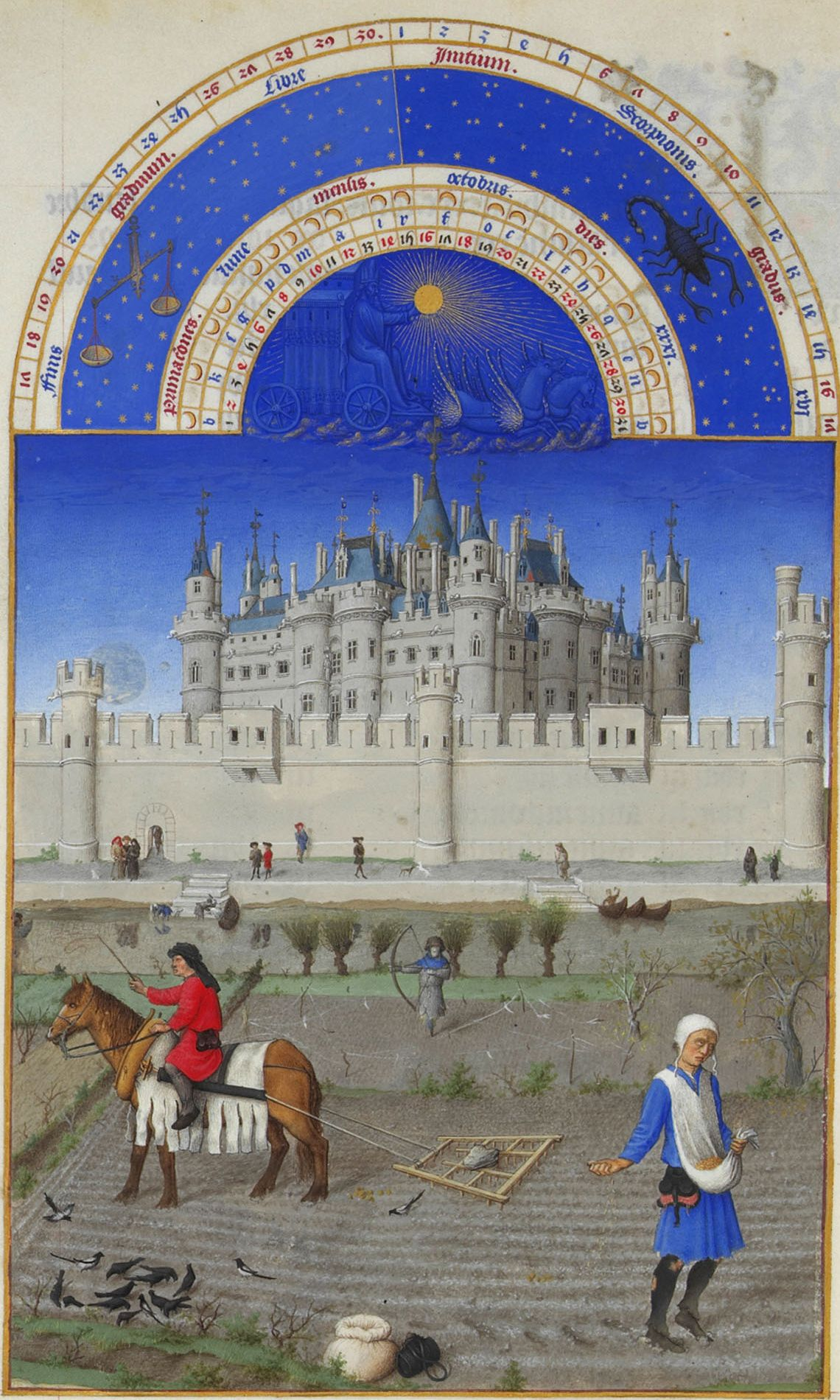
The fortress of the Louvre as it appeared in this 15th-century manuscript illumination Les Très Riches Heures du Duc de Berry, month of October

A page of the first book printed in France (1470): the Epistolae ("Letters") by Gasparinus de Bergamo (Gasparino da Barzizza).

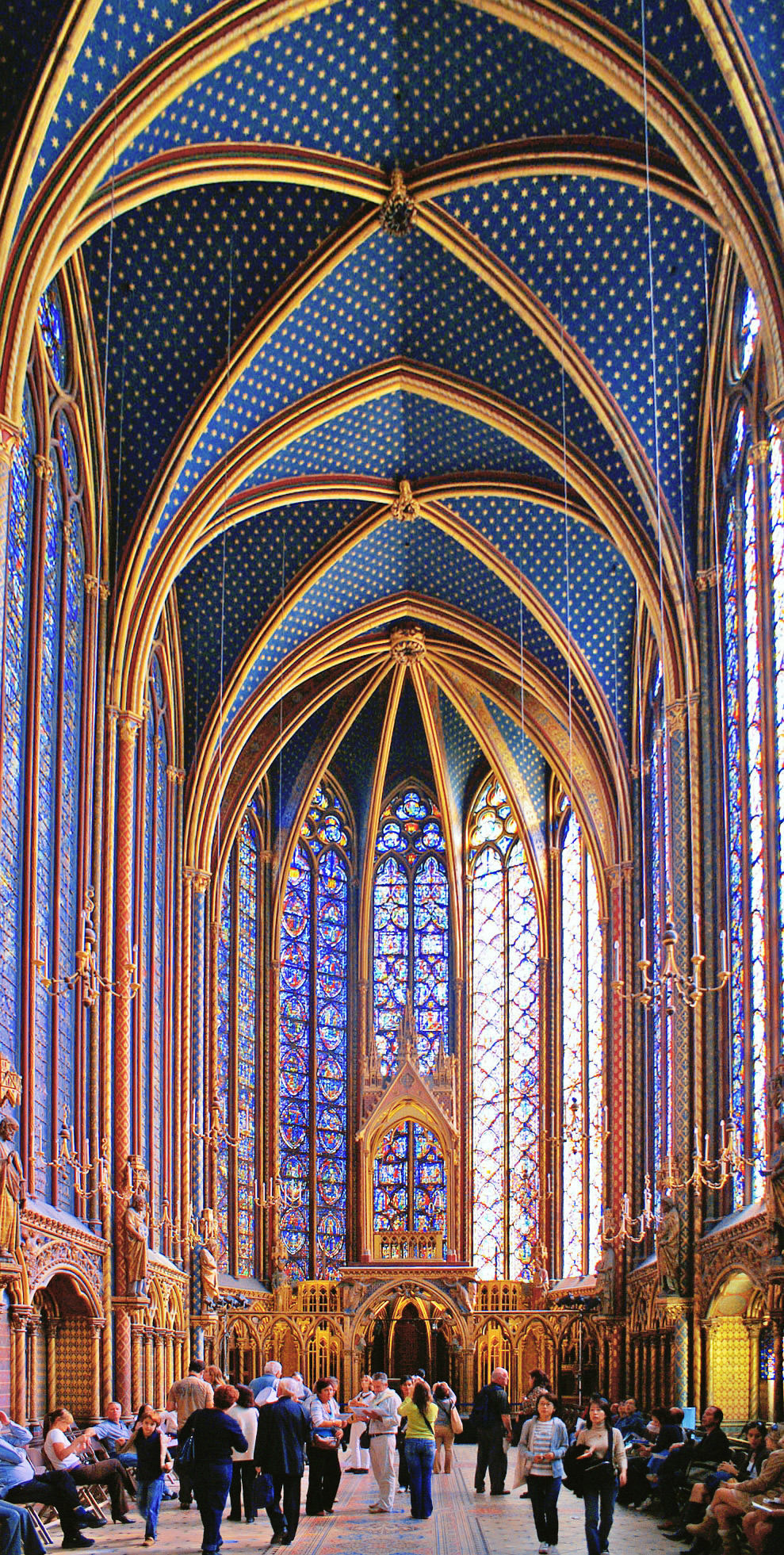
The Sainte-Chapelle, the chapel of the former royal palace on the Île de la Cité, flooded by light through the stained glass windows, is a masterpiece of the Gothic style. (13th century)

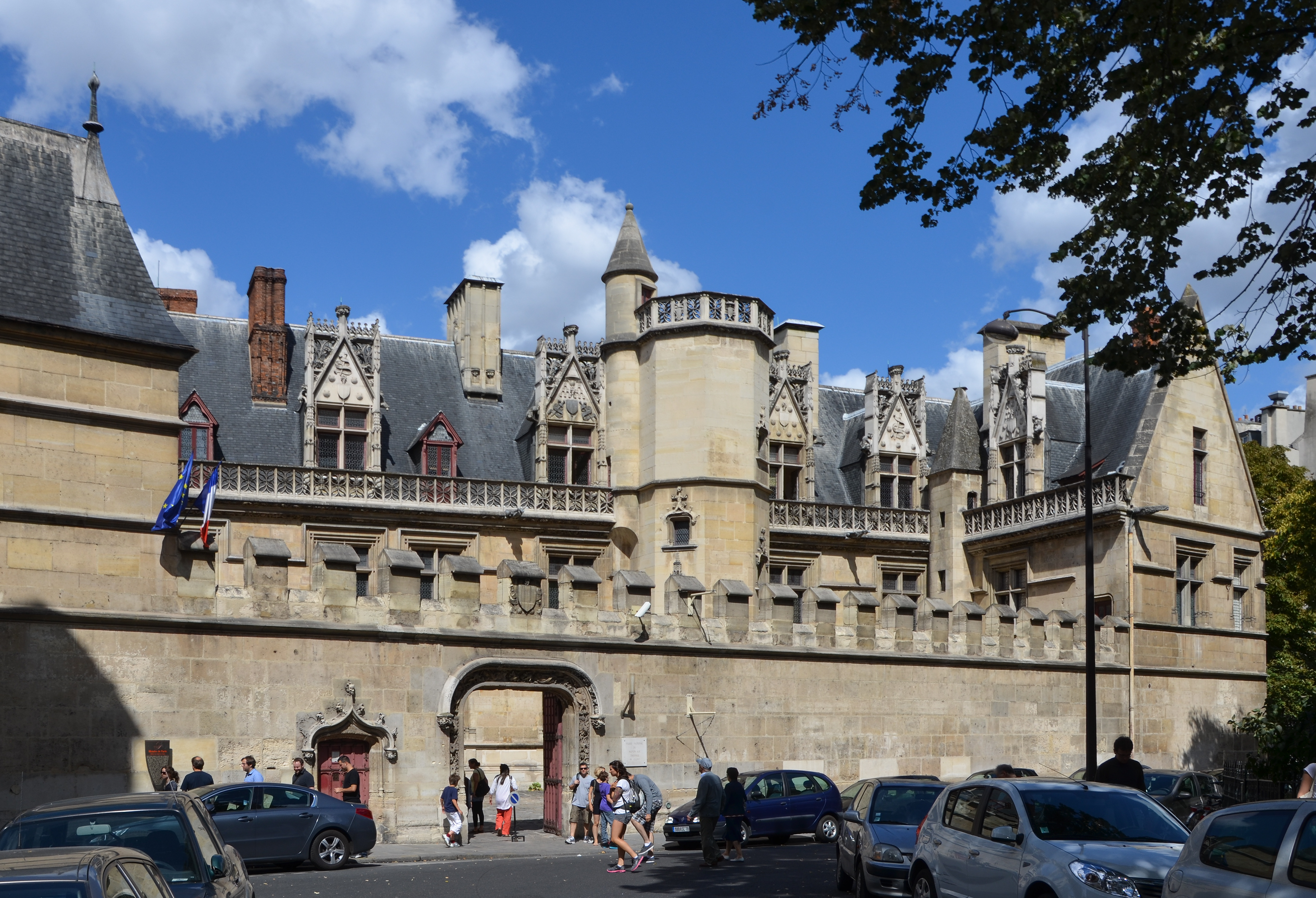
The Hôtel de Cluny (1485–1510), the former residence of the abbots of the Cluny monastery, is now the Museum of the Middle Ages.

At the beginning of the 12th century, the French kings of the Capetian dynasty controlled little more than Paris and the surrounding region, but they did their best to build up Paris as the political, economic, religious and cultural capital of France. The distinctive character of the city's districts continued to emerge at this time. The Île de la Cité was the site of the royal palace, and construction of the new Cathedral of Notre-Dame de Paris began in 1163.

The Left Bank (south of the Seine) was the site of the new University of Paris established by the Church and royal court to train scholars in theology, mathematics and law, and the two great monasteries of Paris: the Abbey of Saint-Germain-des-Prés and the Abbey of Saint Geneviève. The Right Bank (north of the Seine) became the centre of commerce and finance, where the port, the central market, workshops and the houses of merchants were located. A league of merchants, the Hanse parisienne, was established and quickly became a powerful force in the city's affairs.

=== Royal palace and the Louvre ===
At the beginning of the Middle Ages, the royal residence was on the Île de la Cité. Between 1190 and 1202, King Philip II built the massive fortress of the Louvre, which was designed to protect the Right Bank against an English attack from Normandy.

Before he departed for the Third Crusade, Philip II began construction of new fortifications for the city. He built a stone wall on the Left Bank, with thirty round towers. On the Right Bank, the wall extended for 2.8 kilometers, with forty towers to protect the new neighbourhoods of the growing medieval city. His third great project was to pave the mud streets with stone. Over the Seine, he also rebuilt two wooden bridges in stone, the Petit-Pont and Grand-Pont, and he began construction of a covered market, Les Halles.

King Philip IV (r. 1285-1314) reconstructed the royal residence on the Île de la Cité, transforming it into a palace. Two of the great ceremonial halls still remain within the structure of the Palais de Justice. He also built a more sinister structure, the Gibbet of Montfaucon, where the corpses of executed criminals were displayed. On 13 October 1307, he used his royal power to arrest the members of the Knights Templar, who, he felt, had grown too powerful, and on 18 March 1314, he had the Grand Master of the Order, Jacques de Molay, burned at the stake.

Between 1356 and 1383, King Charles V built a new wall of fortifications around the city. He also built the Bastille, a large fortress guarding the Porte Saint-Antoine at the eastern end of Paris, and an imposing new fortress at Vincennes, east of the city. Charles V moved his official residence from the Île de la Cité to the Louvre, but preferred to live in the Hôtel Saint-Pol.

=== Saint-Denis, Notre-Dame and the birth of the Gothic style ===
The flourishing of religious architecture in Paris was largely the work of Suger, the abbot of Saint-Denis from 1122 to 1151 and an advisor to Kings Louis VI and Louis VII. He rebuilt the old Carolingian Basilica of Saint Denis, creating a dramatic wall of stained glass windows that flooded the church with light. This style, which later was named Gothic, was copied by other Paris churches and quickly spread to England and Germany. An even more ambitious building project, a new cathedral for Paris, was begun by bishop Maurice de Sully in about 1160 and continued for two centuries. The first stone of the choir of the cathedral of Notre Dame de Paris was laid in 1163, and the altar was consecrated in 1182.

In the 13th century, King Louis IX (r. 1226–1270), known to history as "Saint Louis", built the Sainte-Chapelle, a masterpiece of Gothic architecture, especially to house relics from the crucifixion of Christ. Built between 1241 and 1248, it has the oldest stained glass windows preserved in Paris. At the same time that the Saint-Chapelle was built, the great stained glass rose windows were added to the transept of the cathedral.

=== University ===
Under Kings Louis VI and Louis VII, Paris became one of the principal centers of learning in Europe. Students, scholars and monks flocked to the city from England, Germany and Italy. They studied first in the different schools attached to Notre-Dame and the Abbey of Saint-Germain-des-Prés. The most famous teacher was Pierre Abelard, who taught five thousand students at the Montagne Sainte-Geneviève. The University of Paris was originally organised in the mid-12th century.

Some twenty thousand students lived on the Left Bank, which became known as the Latin Quarter, because Latin was the language of instruction and the common language in which the foreign students could converse. In 1257, the chaplain of Louis IX, Robert de Sorbon, opened the oldest and most famous College of the University, which was later named after him, the Sorbonne. From the 13th to the 15th century, the University of Paris was the most important school of Roman Catholic theology in western Europe. Its teachers included Roger Bacon from England, Saint Thomas Aquinas from Italy, and Saint Bonaventure from Germany.

=== Paris merchants ===
Beginning in the 11th century, Paris had been governed by a Royal Provost, appointed by the king, who lived in the fortress of Grand Châtelet. Saint Louis created a new position, the Provost of the Merchants, to share authority with the Royal Provost and recognize the growing power and wealth of the merchants of Paris. Saint Louis also created the first municipal council of Paris, with twenty-four members.

In 1328, Paris's population was about 200,000, which made it the most populous city in Europe. With the growth in population came growing social tensions; the first riots took place in December 1306 against the Provost of the Merchants, who was accused of raising rents. The houses of many merchants were burned, and twenty-eight rioters were hanged. In January 1357, Étienne Marcel, the Provost of Paris, led a merchants' revolt using violence in a bid to curb the power of the monarchy and obtain privileges for the city and the Estates General, which had met for the first time in Paris in 1347. After initial concessions by the Crown, the city was retaken by royalist forces in 1358 and Marcel was killed.

=== Plague and war ===
A recreated map of Paris in 1380

In the mid-14th century, Paris was struck by two great catastrophes: the bubonic plague and the Hundred Years' War. In the first epidemic of the plague in 1348–1349, forty to fifty thousand Parisians died, a quarter of the population. The plague returned in 1360–1361, 1363, and 1366–1368. There were at least 36 occasions of plague in the city between 1348 and 1480. During the 16th and 17th centuries, plague visited the city almost one year out of three. Other diseases that ravaged Paris included the mumps in 1414, scarlet fever in 1418 and smallpox in 1433 and 1438.

The war was even more catastrophic. Beginning in 1346, an English army under King Edward III of England engaged in a chevauchée in the countryside surrounding Paris. A decade later, when John II of France was captured by the English at the 1356 Battle of Poitiers, disbanded groups of mercenary soldiers pillaged the outskirts of Paris. An Anglo-Burgundian army briefly captured Paris during the night of 28 May 1418. Under the leadership of Henry V of England, Paris was again captured by the English in 1420; the infant Henry VI of England was crowned as the King of France there in 1431. Beginning in 1422, the north of France was ruled by John of Lancaster, 1st Duke of Bedford, the regent of Henry VI, who was residing in Paris. Charles VII of France only ruled France south of the Loire River. During her unsuccessful attempt to capture Paris on 8 September 1429, Joan of Arc was wounded just outside the Porte Saint-Honoré, the westernmost fortified entrance of the Wall of Charles V.

When the English left Paris in 1436, Charles VII was finally able to return. Many areas of the city were in ruins, and 100,000 Parisians, half of the city's population, had left Paris. When Paris was again the capital of France, the succeeding monarchs chose to live in the Loire Valley and visited Paris only on special occasions. King Francis I finally returned the royal residence to Paris in 1528.

== 16th century ==
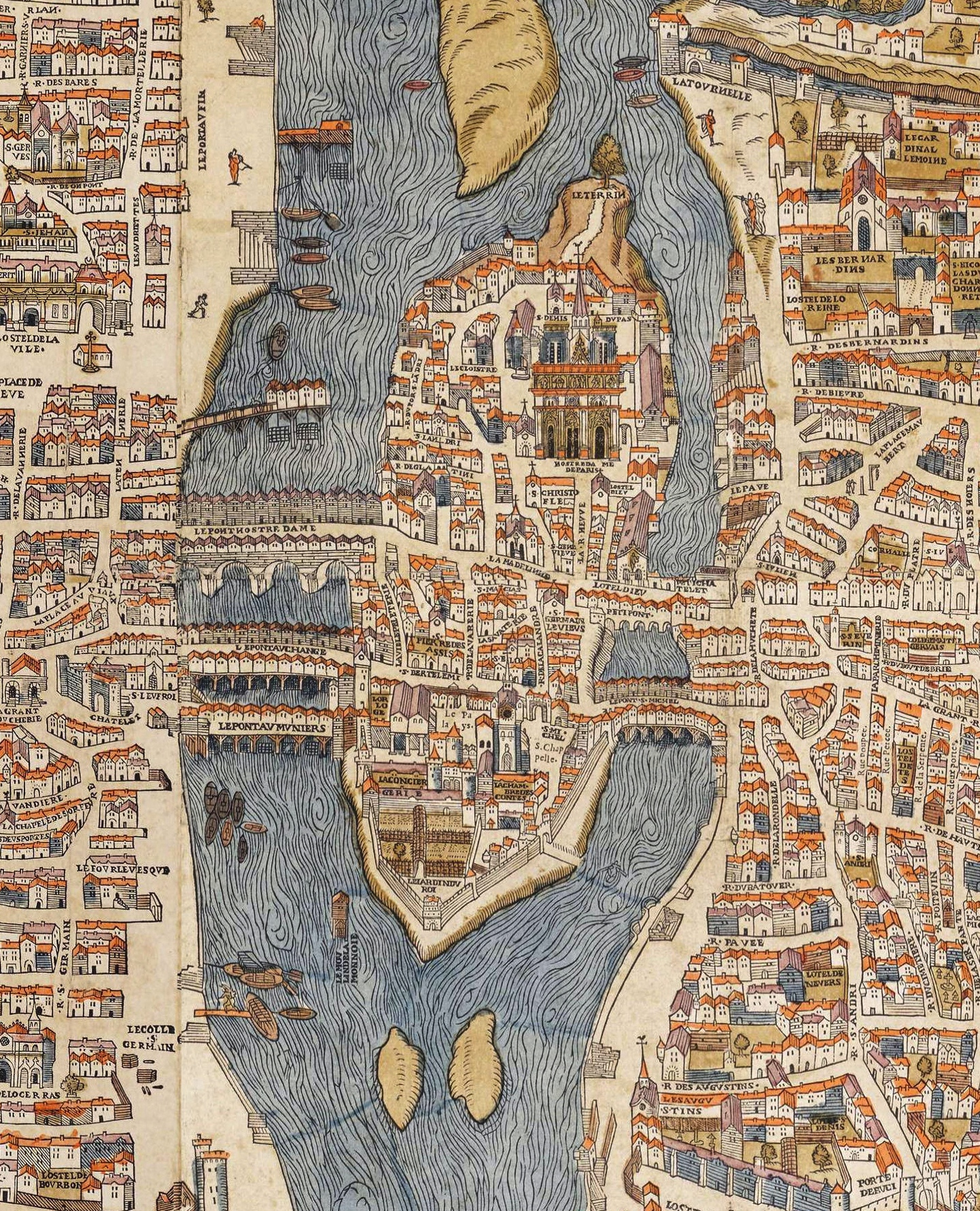
The centre of Paris in 1550, by Olivier Truschet and Germain Hoyau

By 1500, Paris had regained its former prosperity, and the population reached 250,000. Each new king of France added buildings, bridges and fountains to embellish his capital, most of them in the new Renaissance style.

King Louis XII rarely visited Paris, but he rebuilt the old wooden Pont Notre Dame, which had collapsed on 25 October 1499. On 15 July 1533, King Francis I laid the foundation stone for the first Hôtel de Ville, the city hall of Paris; it was not finished until 1628. Cortona also designed the first Renaissance church in Paris, the church of Saint-Eustache (1532). The first Renaissance house in Paris was the Hôtel Carnavalet, begun in 1545.

In 1534, Francis I became the first French king to make the Louvre his residence. Francis also reinforced the position of Paris as a center of learning and scholarship. In 1500, there were seventy-five printing houses in Paris, second only to Venice, and later in the 16th century, Paris brought out more books than any other European city. In 1530, Francis created a new faculty at the University of Paris with the mission of teaching Hebrew, Greek and mathematics. It became the Collège de France.

Francis I died in 1547, and his son, Henry II, continued to decorate Paris in the French Renaissance style: the finest Renaissance fountain in the city, the Fontaine des Innocents, was built to celebrate Henry's official entrance into Paris in 1549. Henry II also added a new wing to the Louvre, the Pavillon du Roi, and a magnificent hall for festivities and ceremonies, the Salle des Cariatides. Henry II died 10 July 1559. His widow, Catherine de' Medici, had the old residence demolished in 1563, and between 1564 and 1572 constructed a new royal residence, the Tuileries Palace, and a large Italian-style garden, the Jardin des Tuileries.

An ominous gulf was growing within Paris between the followers of the established Catholic church and those of Protestant Calvinism and Renaissance humanism. The Sorbonne and University of Paris forcefully attacked the Protestant and humanist doctrines, and the scholar Étienne Dolet was burned at the stake in 1546 on the orders of the theology faculty of the Sorbonne. But the new doctrines continued to grow in popularity, particularly among the French upper classes. Beginning in 1562, repression and massacres of Protestants in Paris alternated with periods of tolerance, during what became known as the French Wars of Religion (1562–1598). Paris was a stronghold of the Catholic League.

On the night of 23–24 August 1572, while many prominent Protestants from all over France were in Paris on the occasion of the marriage of Henry of Navarre—the future King Henry IV—to Margaret of Valois, the royal council decided to assassinate the leaders of the Protestants. The targeted killings quickly turned into a general slaughter of Protestants by Catholic mobs, known as St. Bartholomew's Day massacre, and it continued through August and September, spreading from Paris to the rest of the country. About three thousand Protestants were massacred in Paris and five to ten thousand elsewhere in France.

King Henry III attempted to find a peaceful solution to the religious conflicts, but the Duke of Guise and his followers in the capital forced him to flee on 12 May 1588, the so-called Day of the Barricades. On 1 August 1589, Henry III was assassinated in the Château de Saint-Cloud. Paris, along with the other towns of the Catholic League, held out until 1594 against Henry IV, who had succeeded Henry III. After a victory over the Holy Union at the Battle of Ivry on 14 March 1590, Henry IV proceeded to lay siege to Paris. The siege was long and unsuccessful. Henry IV agreed to convert to Catholicism. On 14 March 1594, Henry IV entered Paris, after having been crowned King of France at the Cathedral of Chartres on 27 February 1594.

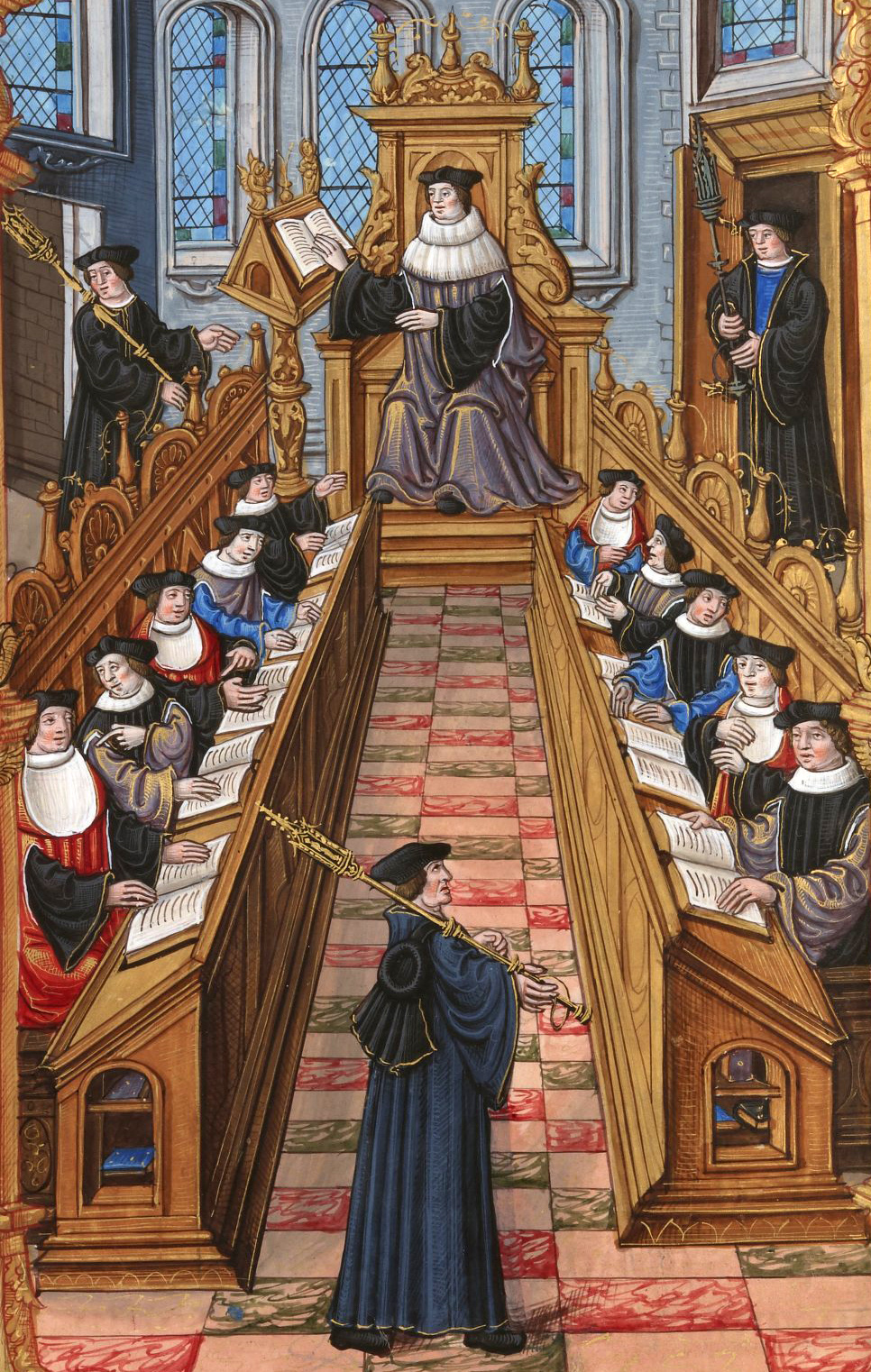
A faculty meeting at the University of Paris in the 16th century

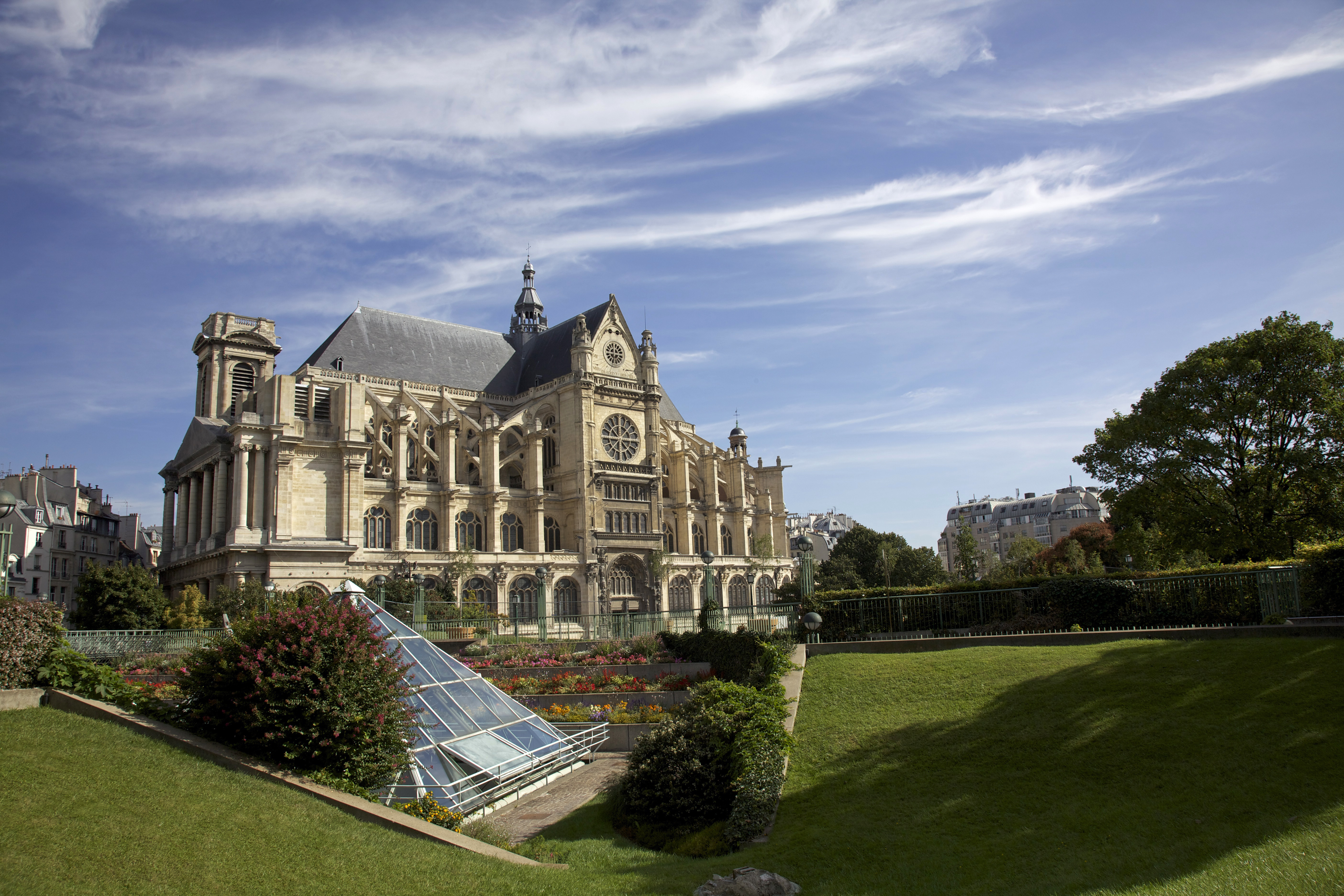
Saint-Eustache (1532), the first Renaissance church in Paris

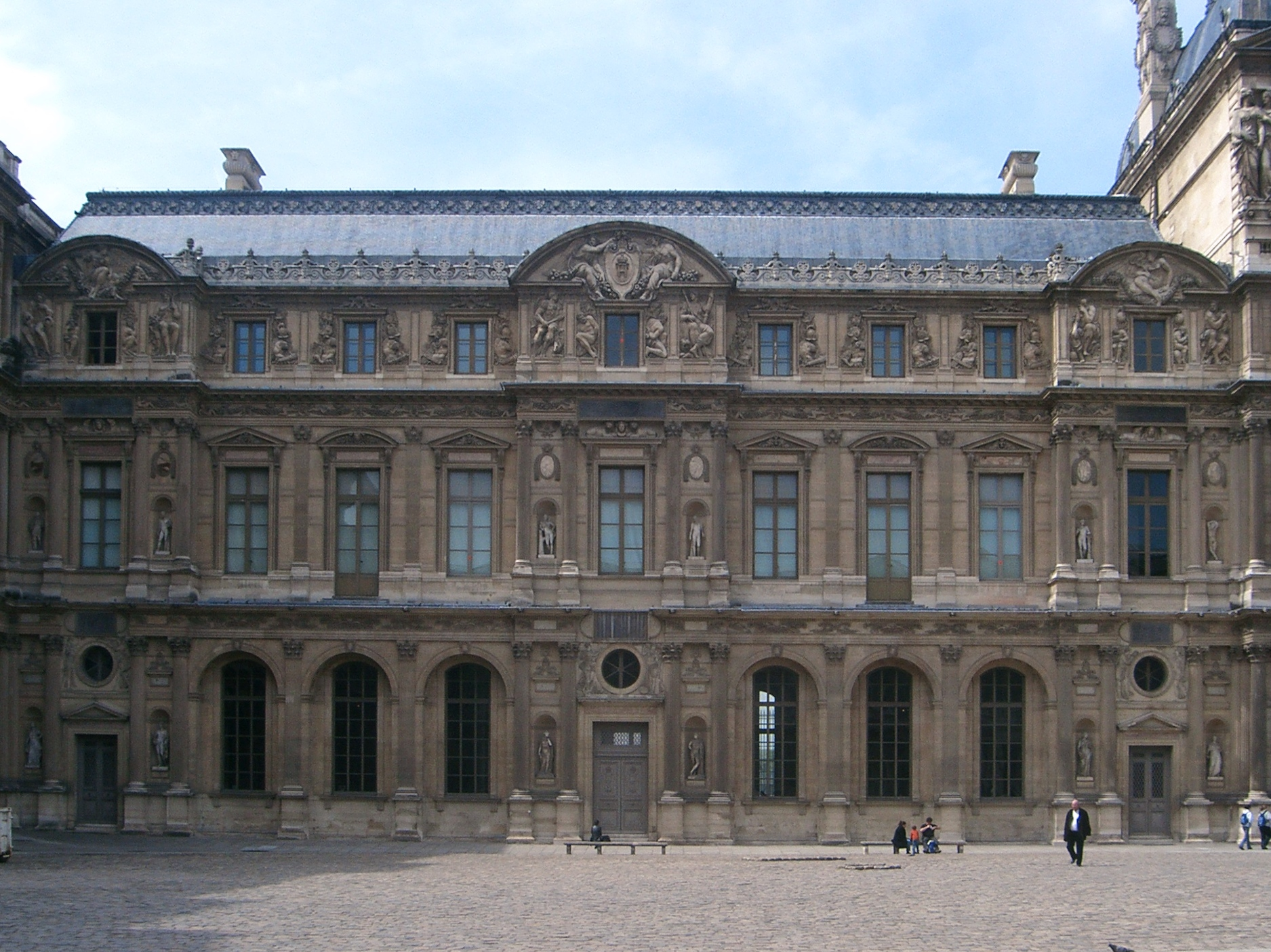
The Lescot wing of the Louvre, rebuilt by Francois I beginning in 1546 in the new French Renaissance style

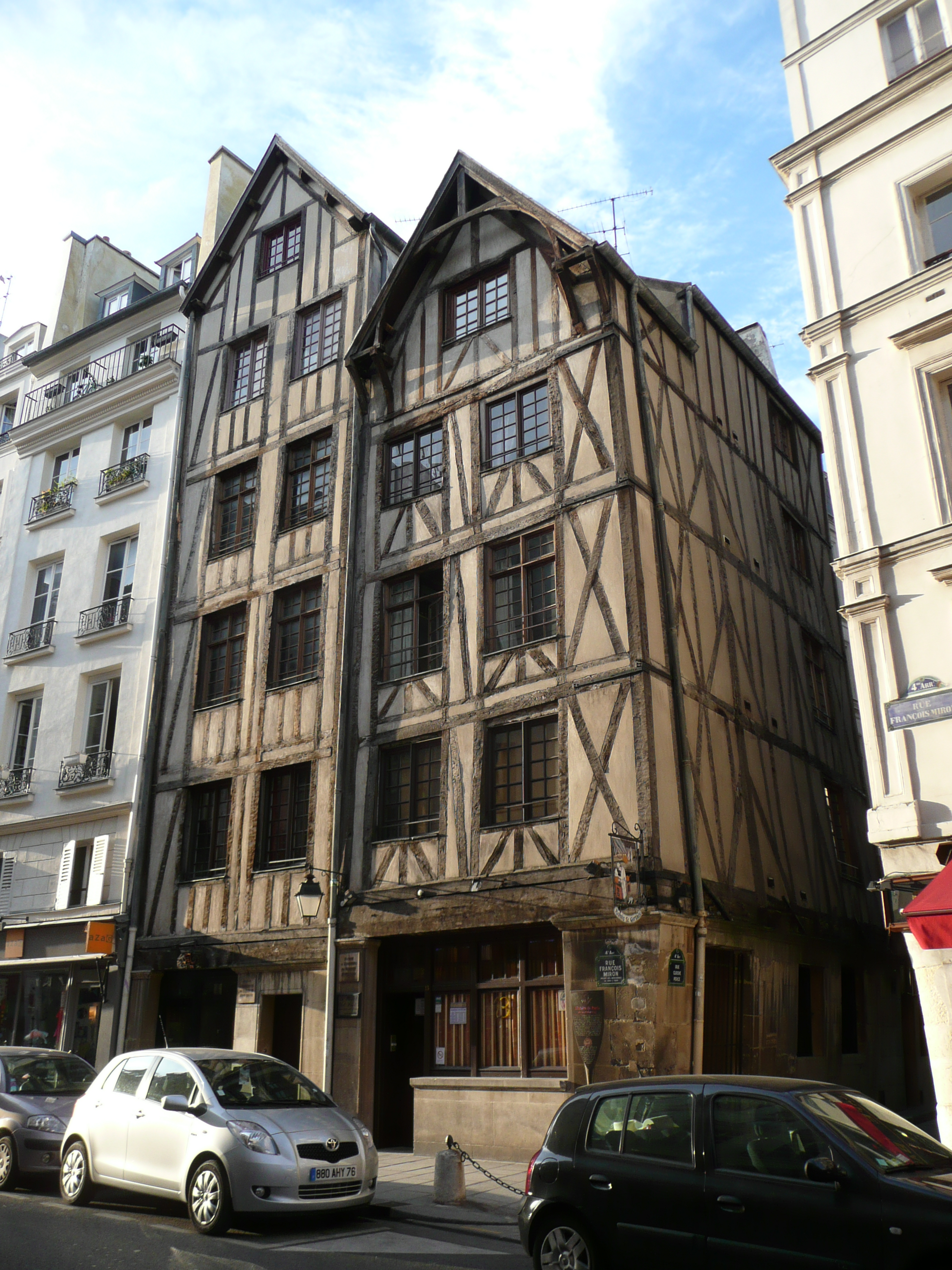
A handful of 16th–17th century houses can still be found in Paris. These houses are at 11 and 13 rue François-Miron in Le Marais.

== 17th century ==
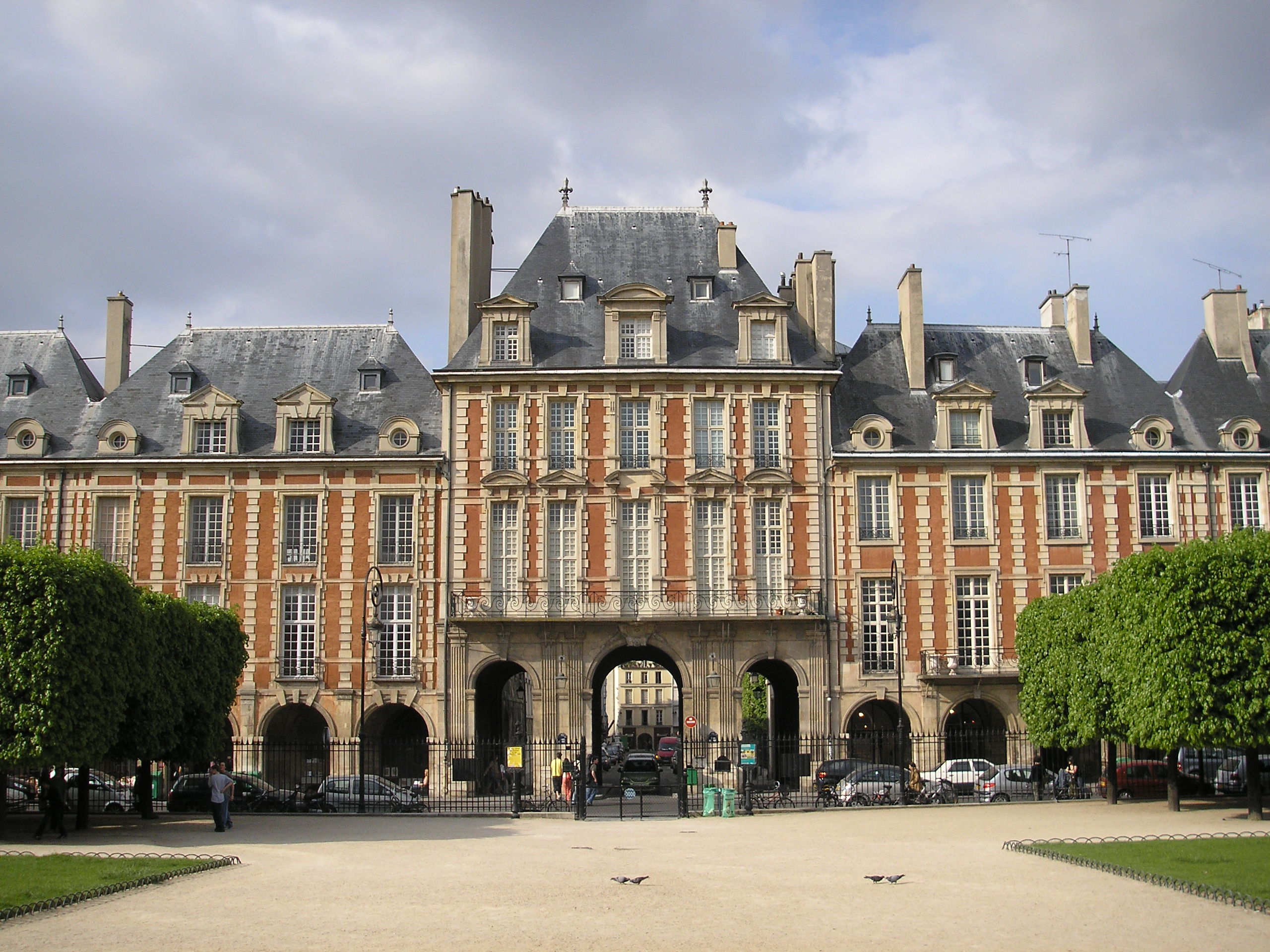
The Place des Vosges, originally the "Place Royale", was begun in 1605 by Henry IV and inaugurated in 1612 by his son Louis XIII; it was the first prestigious residential square in Paris.

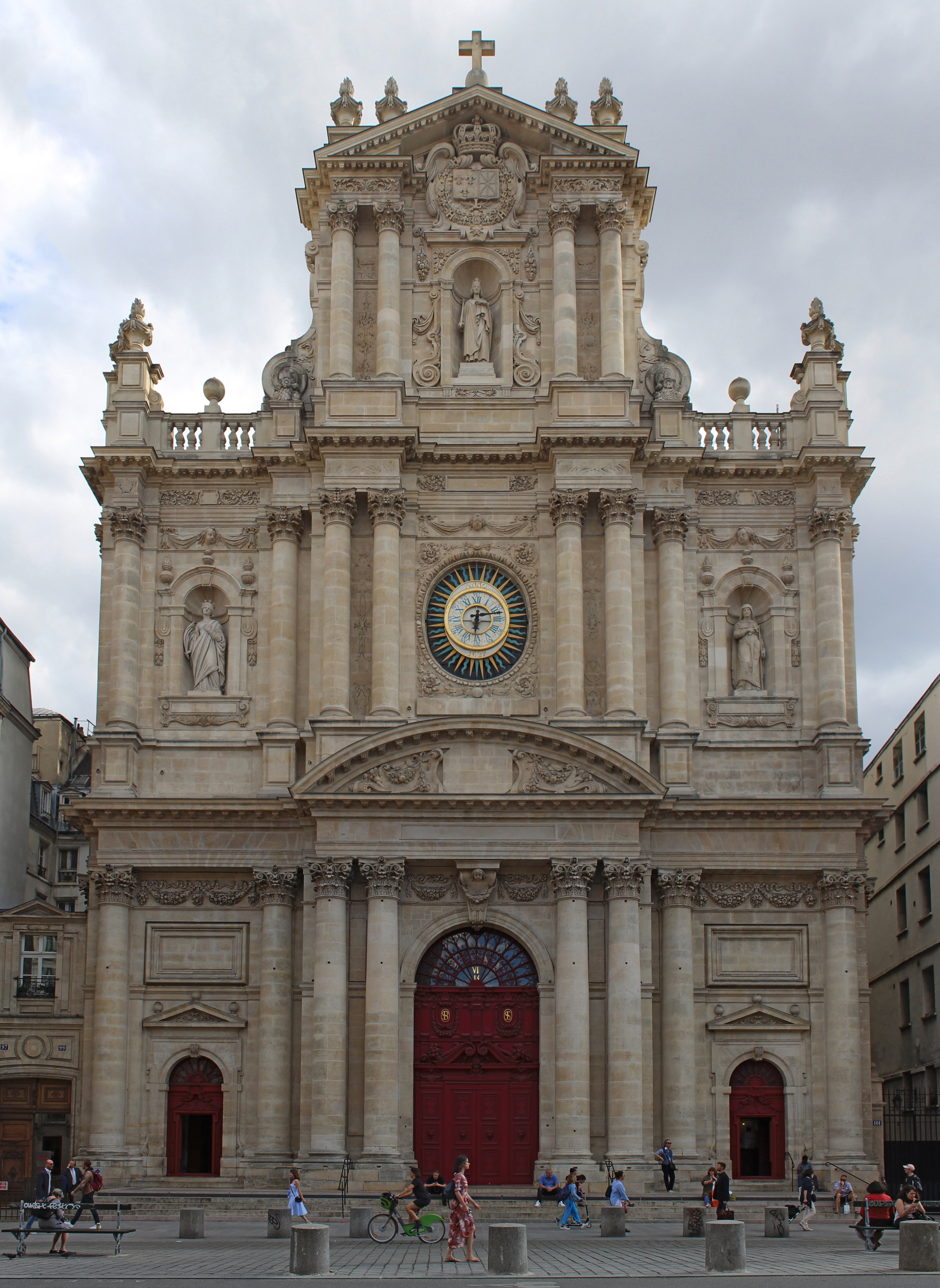
The façade of the church of Saint-Paul-Saint-Louis in Le Marais, a French adaptation of the sober Jesuit style (1627–1647)

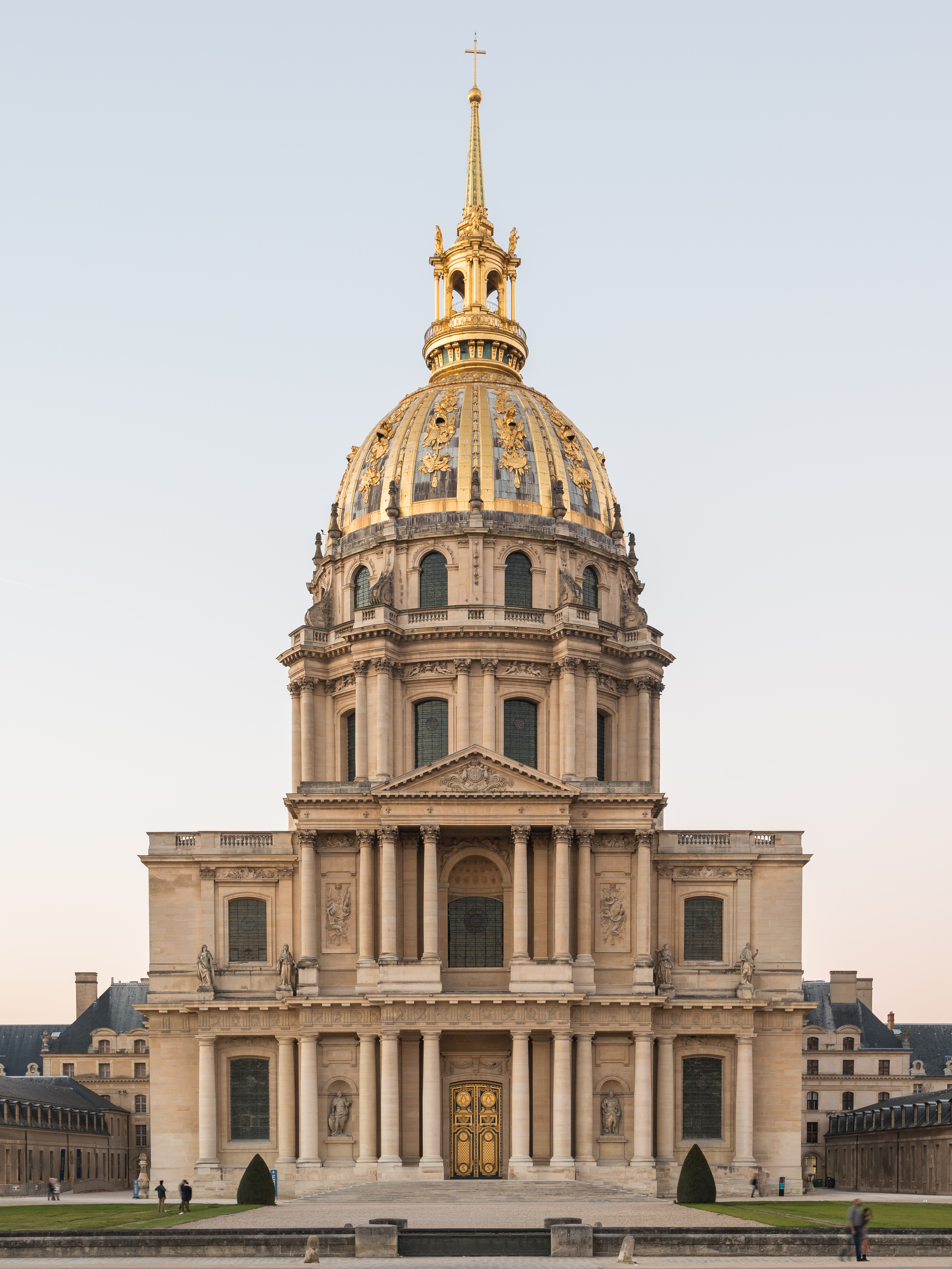
The church of Les Invalides (1671–1678) was built by Louis XIV as the chapel of a hospital for war-wounded and retired soldiers.

Paris suffered greatly during the wars of religion of the 16th century; a third of the Parisians fled, many houses were destroyed, and the grand projects of the Louvre, the Hôtel de Ville, and the Tuileries Palace were unfinished. Henry IV took away the independence of the city government and ruled Paris directly through royal officers. He relaunched the building projects and built a new wing of the Louvre along the Seine, which connected the old Louvre with the new Tuileries Palace. The project of making the Louvre into a single great palace continued for the next three hundred years.

Henry IV's building projects for Paris were managed by the Duke of Sully, his forceful superintendent of buildings and minister of finances. Henry IV recommenced the construction of the Pont Neuf, started by Henry III in 1578; it was finished between 1600 and 1607. It was the first Paris bridge built without houses. Near the bridge, he built "La Samaritaine" (1602–1608), a large pumping station which provided drinking water as well as water for the gardens of the Louvre and the Tuileries.

== The Louvre project ==
Between 1605 and 1612, he built an elegant new residential square surrounded by brick houses and an arcade. In 1607, Henry began work on a new residential triangle, the Place Dauphine. It was his final project for the city of Paris. Henri IV was assassinated on 14 May 1610. Henry IV's widow Marie de' Medici decided to build her own residence, the Luxembourg Palace (1615–1630), modelled after the Pitti Palace in her native Florence. In the Italian gardens of her palace, she commissioned a Florentine fountain-maker, Tommaso Francini, to create the Medici Fountain. To provide water for her gardens and fountains, Marie de' Medici had the old Roman aqueduct from Rungis reconstructed. In 1616, she also created the Cours-la-Reine, a long promenade lined with eighteen hundred elm trees.

Louis XIII continued the Louvre project begun by Henri IV by creating the cour carrée, or square courtyard. His chief minister, the Cardinal de Richelieu, added another important building in the centre of Paris. In 1624, he started construction of a grand new residence for himself, the "Palais-Cardinal", now known as the Palais-Royal. In the first part of the 17th century, Richelieu helped introduce a new religious architectural style into Paris that was inspired by the famous churches in Rome. The first façade built in the Jesuit style was that of the church of Saint-Gervais (1616). The first church entirely built in the new style was Saint-Paul-Saint-Louis, on the Rue Saint-Antoine in Le Marais, between 1627 and 1647. The dome of Saint Peter's in Rome inspired the dome of the chapel of the Sorbonne (1635–1642) commissioned by Cardinal Richelieu, who was the proviseur, or head of the college. The chapel became his final resting place. The plan was taken from another Roman church, San Carlo ai Catinari. The new style, sometimes called Flamboyant Gothic or French baroque, appeared in many other new churches, including Notre-Dame de Bonne-Nouvelle (1624), Notre-Dame-des-Victoires (1629), Saint-Sulpice (1646), and Saint-Roch (1653). The largest project in the new style was Val-de-Grâce, built by Anne of Austria, the widow of Louis XIII. Modeled after the Escorial in Spain, it combined a convent, a church, and royal apartments for the widowed queen. One of the architects of Val-de-Grâce and several of the other new churches was François Mansart, most famous for the sloping roof that became the signature feature of the buildings of the 17th century. During the first half of the 17th century, the population of Paris nearly doubled, reaching 400,000 at the end of the reign of Louis XIII in 1643. To facilitate communication between the Right Bank and Left Bank, Louis XIII built five new bridges over the Seine, doubling the existing number. The nobility, government officials and the wealthy built elegant hôtels particuliers, or town residences, on the Right Bank in the new Faubourg Saint-Honoré, the Faubourg Saint-Jacques, and in the Marais near the Place des Vosges.

== Louis XIII ==
The old ferryboat between the Louvre and the Rue de Bac on the Left Bank was replaced by a wooden and then a stone bridge, the Pont Royal, finished by Louis XIV. Near the end of new bridge on the Left Bank, a new fashionable neighborhood, the Faubourg Saint-Germain, soon appeared. Under Louis XIII, two small islands in the Seine, the Île Notre-Dame and the Île-aux-vaches, which had been used for grazing cattle and storing firewood, were combined to form the Île Saint-Louis, which became the site of the splendid hôtels particuliers of Parisian financiers.

Under Louis XIII, Paris solidified its reputation as the cultural capital of Europe. Beginning in 1609, the Louvre Galerie was created, where painters, sculptors, and artisans lived and established their workshops. The Académie Française, modelled after the academies of Italian Renaissance princes, was created in 1635 by Cardinal Richelieu. The Royal Academy of Painting and Sculpture, later the Academy of Fine Arts, was founded in 1648. The first botanical garden in France was founded in 1633 and was the first public garden in Paris. The first permanent theatre in Paris was created by Cardinal Richelieu in 1635 within his Palais-Cardinal.

== Louis XIV ==
Richelieu died in 1642, and Louis XIII in 1643. At the death of his father, Louis XIV was only five years old, and his mother Anne of Austria became regent. Richelieu's successor, Cardinal Mazarin, tried to impose a new tax upon the Parlement of Paris, which consisted of a group of prominent nobles of the city. When they refused to pay, Mazarin had the leaders arrested. This marked the beginning a long uprising, known as the Fronde, that pitted the Parisian nobility against royal authority. It lasted from 1648 to 1653.

At times, the young Louis XIV was held under virtual house arrest in the Palais-Royal. He and his mother were forced to flee the city twice, in 1649 and 1651, until the army could retake control of Paris. As a result of the Fronde, Louis XIV had a profound lifelong distrust of Paris. He moved his Paris residence from the Palais-Royal to the more secure Louvre and then, in 1671, he moved the royal residence out of the city to Versailles and came into Paris as seldom as possible.

Despite the distrust of the king, Paris continued to grow and prosper, reaching a population of between 400,000 and 500,000. The king named Jean-Baptiste Colbert as his new Superintendent of Buildings, and Colbert began an ambitious building programme to make Paris the successor to ancient Rome. To make his intention clear, Louis XIV organised a festival in the carrousel of the Tuileries in January 1661, in which he appeared, on horseback, in the costume of a Roman Emperor. Louis XIV completed the Cour carrée of the Louvre and built a majestic row of columns along its east façade (1670). Inside the Louvre, his architect Louis Le Vau and his decorator Charles Le Brun created the Gallery of Apollo, the ceiling of which featured an allegoric figure of the young king steering the chariot of the sun across the sky. He enlarged the Tuileries Palace with a new north pavilion, and had André Le Nôtre, the royal gardener, remodel the gardens of the Tuileries.

Across the Seine from the Louvre, Louis XIV built the Collège des Quatre-Nations (1662–1672), an ensemble of four baroque palaces and a domed church, to house students (today it is the Institut de France). He built a new hospital for Paris, the Salpêtrière, and, for wounded soldiers, a new hospital complex with two churches: Les Invalides (1674). In the centre of Paris, he constructed two monumental new squares, the Place des Victoires (1689) and the Place Vendôme (1698). Louis XIV declared that Paris was secure against any attack and no longer needed its walls. He demolished the main city walls, creating the space which eventually became the Grands Boulevards. To celebrate the destruction of the old walls, he built two small arches of triumph, the Porte Saint-Denis (1672) and the Porte Saint-Martin (1676).

The cultural life of the city also flourished; the city's future most famous theater, the Comédie Française, was created in 1680 on a former tennis court on the Rue Fossés Saint-Germain-des-Prés. The city's first café-restaurant, the Café Procope, was opened in 1686 by the Italian Francesco Procopio dei Coltelli.

For the poor of Paris, life was very different. They were crowded into tall, narrow, five- or six-story high buildings that lined the winding streets on the Île de la Cité and other medieval quarters of the city. Crime in the dark streets was a serious problem. Metal lanterns were hung in the streets, and Colbert increased to four hundred the number of archers who acted as night watchmen. Gabriel Nicolas de la Reynie was appointed the first lieutenant-general of police of Paris in 1667, a position he held for thirty years; his successors reported directly to the king.

== King Louis XV ==
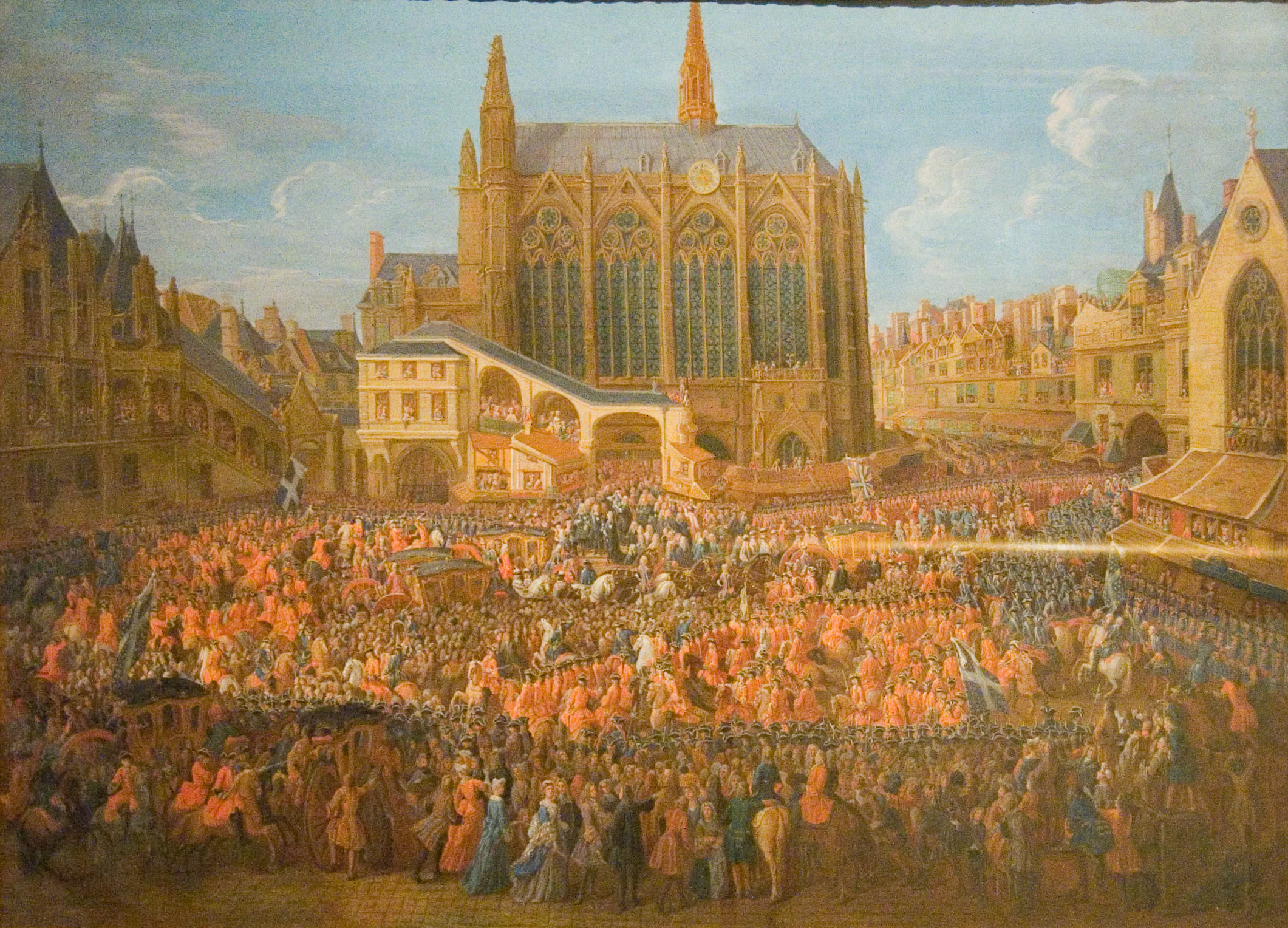
Louis XV, the new king of France at the age of five, making a grand exit from the Royal Palace on the Île de la Cité (1715), by Pierre-Denis Martin, Carnavalet Museum

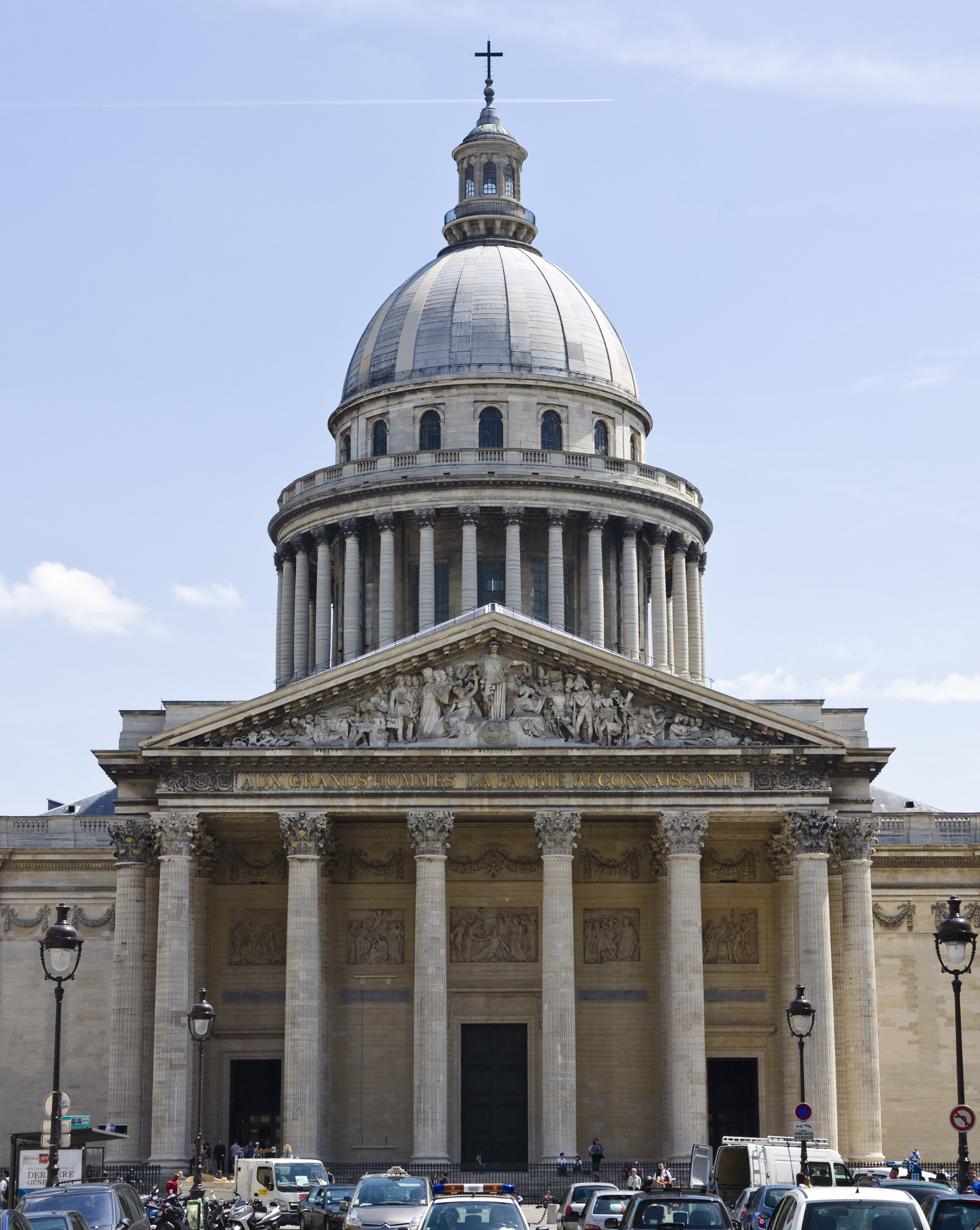
The Panthéon (1758–1790) was originally built as the church of Sainte-Geneviève, but during the Revolution became a mausoleum for French statesmen, scientists and writers.

Louis XIV died on 1 September 1715. Philippe d'Orléans, the regent for the five-year-old King Louis XV, moved the royal residence and government back to Paris. The king lived in the Tuileries Palace, while the regent lived in his family's luxurious Parisian residence, the Palais-Royal (the former Palais-Cardinal of Cardinal Richelieu). The regent devoted his attention to theater, opera, costume balls, and the courtesans of Paris.

In 1719, he moved the Royal library to the Hôtel de Nevers near the Palais-Royal, where it eventually became part of the Bibliothèque nationale de France (National Library of France). On 15 June 1722, distrustful of the turbulence in Paris, the regent moved the court back to Versailles. Afterwards, Louis XV visited the city only on special occasions.

One of the major building projects in Paris of Louis XV and his successor, Louis XVI, was the new church of Sainte Geneviève on top of the Montagne Sainte-Geneviève on the Left Bank, the future Panthéon. The plans were approved by the king in 1757 and work continued until the French Revolution. Louis XV also built a new military school, the École Militaire (1773), a new medical school, the École de Chirurgie (1775), and a new mint, the Hôtel des Monnaies (1768). The predominant architectural style in Paris from the mid-17th century until the regime of Louis Philippe was neo-classicism, based on the model of Greco-Roman architecture.

=== Expansion ===
Under Louis XV, the city expanded westward. A new boulevard, the Champs-Élysées, was laid out from the Tuileries Garden to the Seine to create a straight line of avenues and monuments known as Paris historical axis. At the beginning of the boulevard, a large square was created between 1766 and 1775. It was first called "Place Louis XV", then the "Place de la Révolution" after 10 August 1792, and finally the Place de la Concorde in 1795 at the time of the Directoire.

Between 1640 and 1789, Paris grew in population from 400,000 to 600,000. London passed it in population in about 1700, but it was still growing at a rapid rate, due largely to migration from the Paris basin and from the north and east of France. The center of the city became more and more crowded; building lots became smaller and buildings taller, up to four, five and even six stories. In 1784, the height of buildings was limited to nine toises, or about eighteen meters.

=== Age of Enlightenment ===
In the 18th century, Paris was the center of an explosion of philosophic and scientific activity known as the Age of Enlightenment. Denis Diderot and Jean le Rond d'Alembert published their Encyclopédie in 1751–52. Paris was the financial capital of France and continental Europe, the primary European center of book publishing, fashion, and the manufacture of fine furniture and luxury goods. Parisian bankers funded new inventions, theatres, gardens, and art.

The first café in Paris had been opened in 1672, and by the 1720s there were around 400 cafés in the city. They became meeting places for the city's writers and scholars. The Café Procope was frequented by Voltaire, Jean-Jacques Rousseau, Diderot and d’Alembert. They became important centres for exchanging news, rumors and ideas, often more reliable than the newspapers of the day.

By 1763, the Faubourg Saint-Germain had replaced Le Marais as the most fashionable residential neighborhood for the aristocracy and the wealthy, who built magnificent private mansions, most of which later became government residences or institutions: the Hôtel d'Évreux (1718–1720) became the Élysée Palace, the residence of the presidents of the French Republic; the Hôtel Matignon, the residence of the prime minister; the Palais Bourbon, the seat of the National Assembly; the Hôtel Salm, the Palais de la Légion d'Honneur; and the Hôtel de Biron eventually became the Rodin Museum.

=== Social problems and taxation ===
Historian Daniel Roche estimated that in 1700 there were between 150,000 and 200,000 indigent persons receiving assistance in Paris, or about a third of the population.

Paris in the first half of the 18th century had many beautiful buildings, but many observers did not consider it a beautiful city. The philosopher Jean-Jacques Rousseau described his disappointment when he first arrived in Paris from Lyon in 1742:

"I expected a city as beautiful as it was grand, of an imposing appearance, where you saw only superb streets, and palaces of marble and gold. Instead, when I entered by the Faubourg Saint-Marceau, I saw only narrow, dirty and foul-smelling streets, and villainous black houses, with an air of unhealthiness; beggars, poverty; wagons-drivers, menders of old garments; and vendors of tea and old hats."

In 1749, in his Embellissements de Paris, Voltaire observed: "The centre of the city is dark, cramped, hideous, something from the time of the most shameful barbarism." The city continued to spread outwards, especially toward the semi-rural west and northwest.

The city had no mayor or single city government; its police chief reported to the king, the prévôt des marchands de Paris represented the merchants, and the Parlement de Paris, made up of nobles, was largely ceremonial and had little real authority: they struggled to provide the basic necessities to a growing population. For the first time, metal plates or stone were put up to indicate the names of streets, and each building was given a number. Rules for hygiene, safety and traffic circulation were codified by the Lieutenant-General of Police. The first oil lamps were installed on the streets late in the 18th century.

Large steam pumps were built to distribute water to the neighbourhoods that could afford it. There were still no proper sewers; the river Bièvre served as an open sewer, discharging the sewage into the Seine. The first fire brigades were organised between 1729 and 1801, particularly after a large fire destroyed the opera house of the Palais-Royal in 1781. By 1750, there were more than ten thousand carriages for hire in Paris, the first Paris taxis.

=== Louis XVI ===
Louis XVI ascended to the throne of France in 1774, and his new government in Versailles desperately needed money. In order to raise revenues by charging taxes on merchandise coming into the city, Paris was encircled between 1784 and 1791 by a new wall that stopped merchants who wished to enter Paris. The wall, known as the Wall of the Ferme générale, had fifty-six gates at which taxes had to be paid. The wall and the taxes were highly unpopular, and, along with shortages of bread, fuelled the growing discontent which eventually exploded in the French Revolution.

== French Revolution (1789–1799) ==
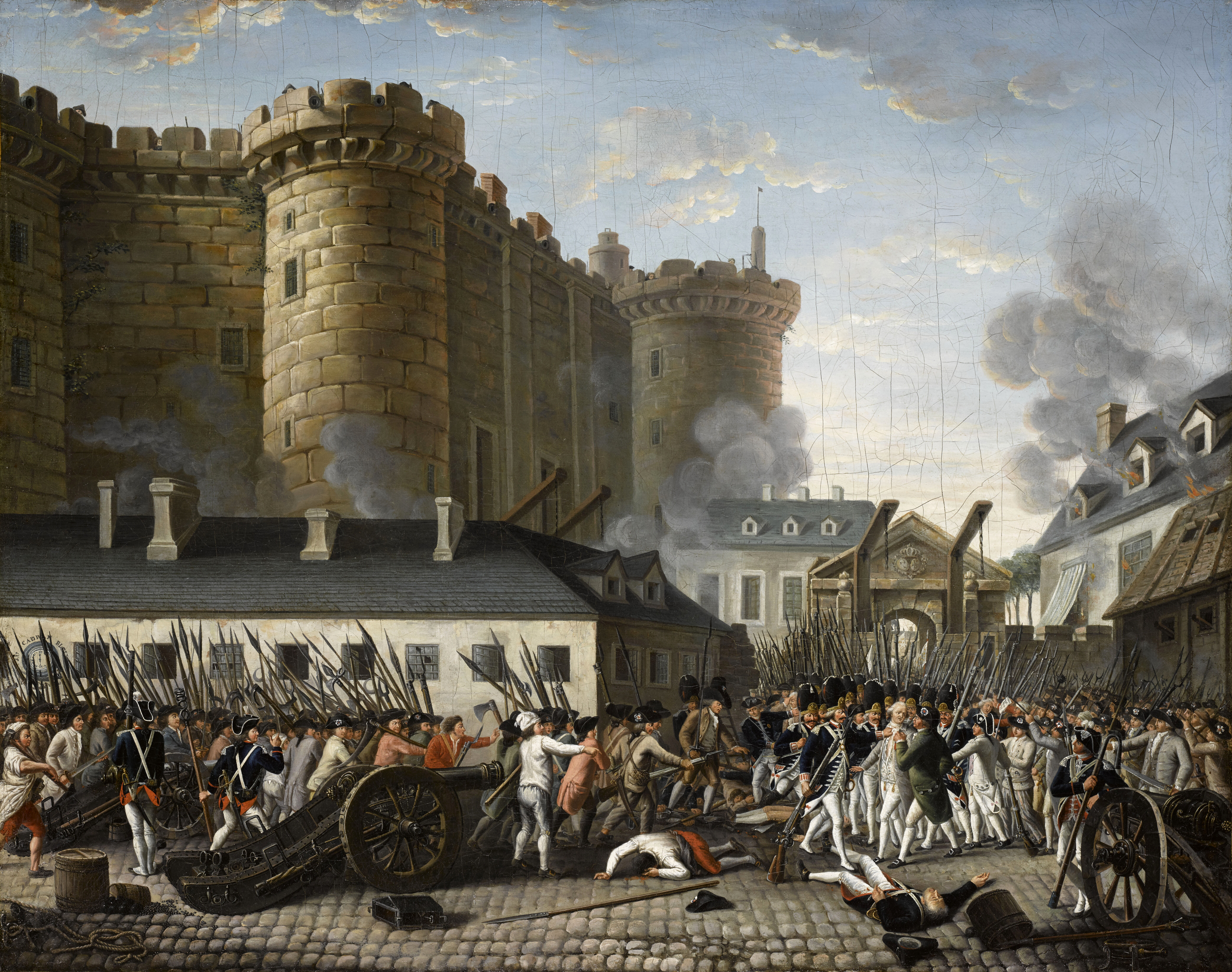
The storming of the Bastille on 14 July 1789; this event marked the beginning of the French Revolution.

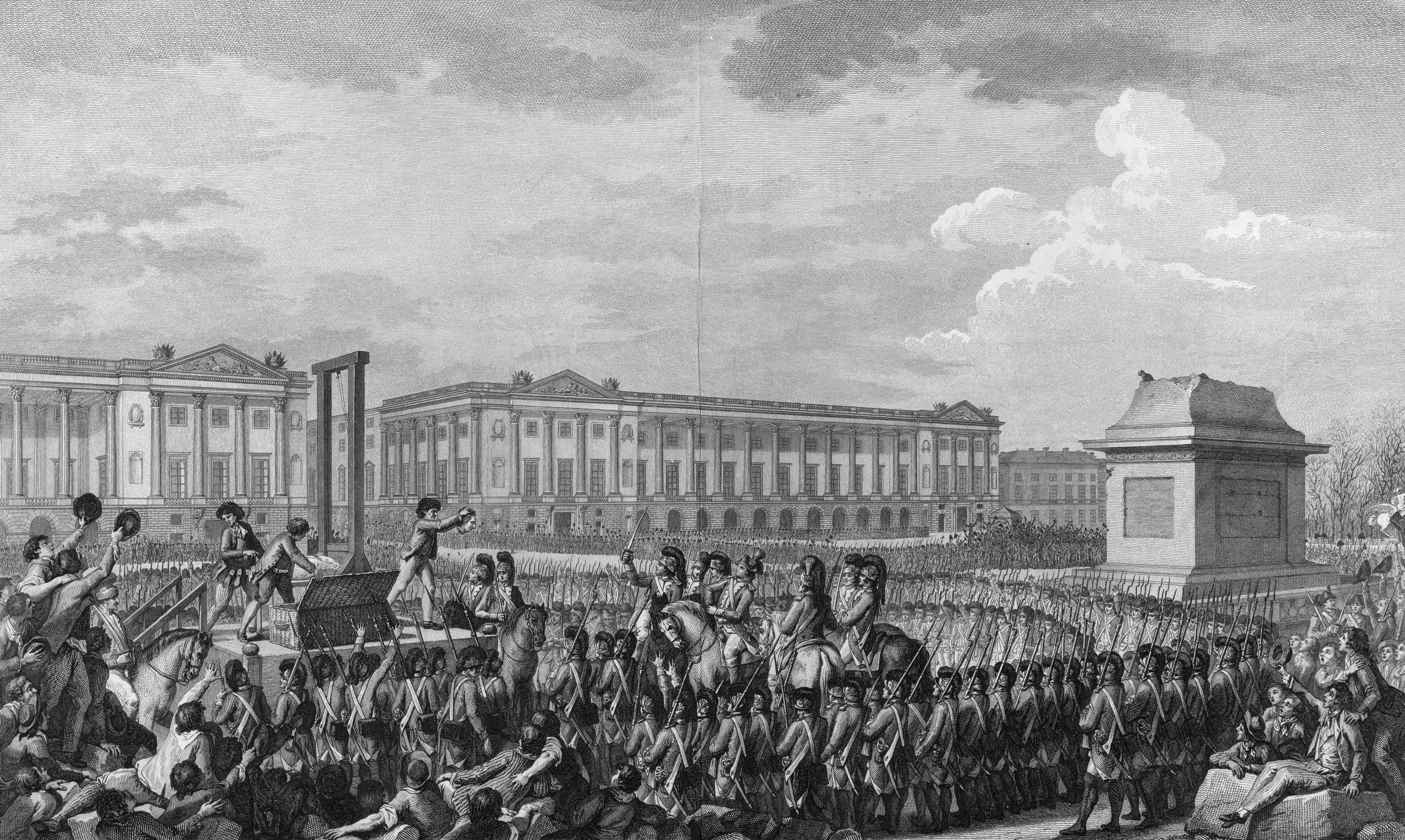
The execution of King Louis XVI on the Place de la Révolution

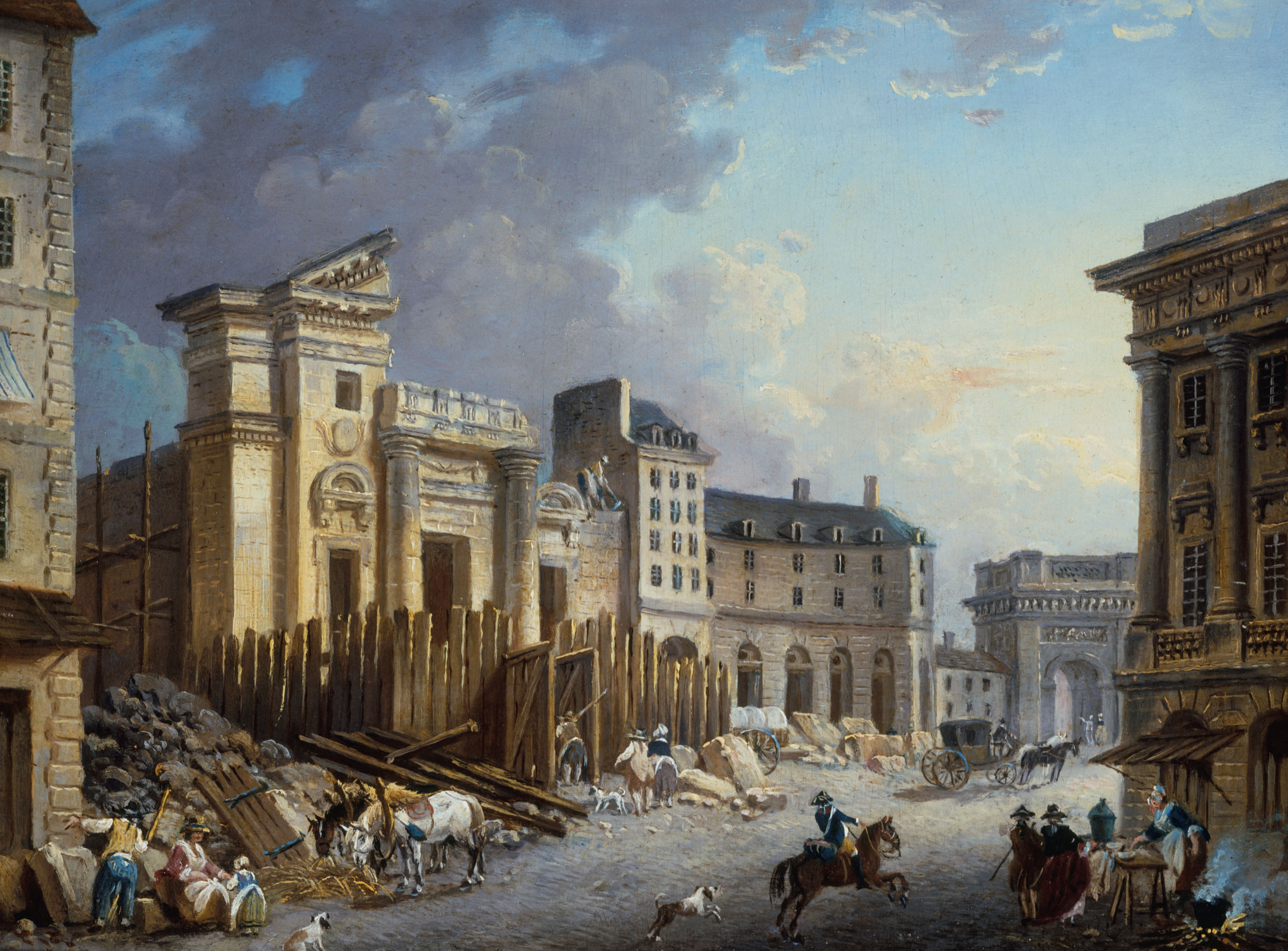
The Demolition of the Church of Saint-Barthélemy by Pierre-Antoine Demachy; many Paris churches were sold, demolished or turned into other uses during the Revolution; the church of Saint-Barthélemy church on the Île de la Cité was sold and demolished for building materials in 1791.

In 1789, the population of Paris was between 600,000 and 640,000. Then as now, most wealthier Parisians lived in the western part of the city, the merchants in the center, and the workers and artisans in the southern and eastern parts, particularly the Faubourg Saint-Honoré. The population included about one hundred thousand extremely poor and unemployed persons, many of whom had recently moved to Paris to escape hunger in the countryside. Known as the sans-culottes, they made up as much as a third of the population of the eastern neighborhoods.

On 11 July 1789, soldiers of the Royal-Allemand regiment attacked a demonstration on the Place Louis XV organized to protest the dismissal by the king of his reformist finance minister Jacques Necker. The reform movement turned quickly into the French Revolution. On 13 July, a crowd of Parisians occupied the Hôtel de Ville, and the Marquis de Lafayette organized the French National Guard to defend the city. On 14 July, a mob seized the arsenal at the Invalides, acquired thousands of guns, and stormed the Bastille. 87 revolutionaries were killed in the fighting. The governor of the Bastille, the Marquis de Launay, surrendered and then was killed. The provost of the merchants of Paris, Jacques de Flesselles, was also murdered.

== The Start of a New Republic ==
The first independent Paris Commune, or city council, met in the Hôtel de Ville on 15 July and chose as the first mayor of Paris Jean Sylvain Bailly. Louis XVI came to Paris on 17 July, where he was welcomed by the new mayor. On 5 October 1789, a large crowd of Parisians marched to Versailles and, the following day, brought the royal family and government back to Paris, virtually as prisoners. The new government of France, the National Assembly, began to meet in the Salle du Manège near the Tuileries Palace.

On 21 May 1790, the Charter of the City of Paris was adopted, declaring the city independent of royal authority: it was divided into twelve municipalities, (later known as arrondissements), and forty-eight sections. Bailly was formally elected mayor by the Parisians on 2 August 1790.

Louis XVI and his family fled Paris on 21 June 1791, but were captured in Varennes and brought back to Paris on 25 June. Hostility grew within Paris between the liberal aristocrats and merchants, who wanted a constitutional monarchy, and the more radical sans-culottes from the working-class and poor neighbourhoods, who wanted a republic and the abolition of the Ancien Régime, including the privileged classes: the aristocracy and the Church. Aristocrats continued to leave Paris for safety in the countryside or abroad. On 17 July 1791, the National Guard fired upon a gathering of petitioners on the Champs de Mars, killing dozens and widening the gulf between the more moderate and more radical revolutionaries.

== Austria,Prussia,and France in a War ==
In April 1792, Austria declared war on France, and in June 1792, the Duke of Brunswick, commander of the army of the King of Prussia, threatened to destroy Paris unless the Parisians accepted the authority of their king. In response to the threat, on 10 August the leaders of the sans-culottes deposed the Paris city government and established their own government, the Insurrectionary Commune, in the Hôtel-de-Ville. Upon learning that a mob of sans-culottes was approaching the Tuileries Palace, the royal family took refuge at the nearby Assembly. In the attack of the Tuileries Palace, the mob killed the last defenders of the king, his Swiss Guards, then ransacked the palace. Threatened by the sans-culottes, the Assembly "suspended" the power of the king and, on 11 August, declared that France would be governed by a National Convention. On 13 August, Louis XVI and his family were imprisoned in the Temple fortress. On 21 September, the Convention abolished the monarchy, and the next day declared France to be a republic. The Committee of Public Safety, charged with hunting down the enemies of the Revolution, established its headquarters in the Pavillon de Flore, the south pavilion of the Tuileries, while the Tribunal, the revolutionary court, set up its courtroom within the old Palais de la Cité.

== The New Government ==
The new government imposed a Reign of Terror. From 2 to 6 September 1792, bands of sans-culottes broke into the prisons and murdered refractory priests, aristocrats and criminals. On 21 January 1793, Louis XVI was guillotined on the Place de la Révolution. Marie Antoinette was executed on 16 October 1793. Bailly, the first Mayor of Paris, was guillotined the following November. During the Reign of Terror, 16,594 persons were tried by the revolutionary tribune and executed by guillotine. Tens of thousands of others associated with the Ancien Régime were arrested and imprisoned. Property of the aristocracy and the Church was confiscated and declared Biens nationaux (national property). The churches were closed.

By order of the Legislative Assembly, the sans-culottes knocked down the spire of Notre Dame Cathedral in 1792. A decree of 1 August 1793 was issued to commemorate the first anniversary of the fall of the monarchy by destroying the tombs at the royal necropolis of Saint-Denis. A number of prominent historic buildings, including the enclosure of the Temple, the Abbey of Montmartre, and most of the Abbey of Saint-Germain-des-Prés, were nationalized and demolished. Many churches were sold as public property and were demolished.

A succession of revolutionary factions ruled Paris: on 1 June 1793, the Montagnards seized power from the Girondins, then were replaced by Georges Danton and his followers; in 1794, they were overthrown and guillotined by a new government led by Maximillien Robespierre. On 27 July 1794, Robespierre himself was arrested and was guillotined the next day. His execution marked the end of the Reign of Terror. The executions then ceased and the prisons gradually emptied.

A new government, the Directory, took the place of the Convention. It moved its headquarters to the Luxembourg Palace and limited the autonomy of Paris. When the authority of the Directory was challenged by a royalist uprising on 13 Vendémiaire (5 October 1795), the Directory called upon a young general, Napoléon Bonaparte, for help. Bonaparte used cannon and grapeshot to clear the streets of demonstrators. On 18 Brumaire (9 November 1799), he organised a coup d'état that overthrew the Directory and replaced it by the Consulate with Bonaparte as First Consul. This event marked the end of the French Revolution and opened the way to the First French Empire.

The population of Paris had dropped to 570,000 by 1797, but building still continued. A new bridge over the Seine, the modern Pont de la Concorde, which had been started under Louis XVI, was completed in 1791. Other landmarks were converted to new purposes: the Panthéon was transformed from a church into a mausoleum, the Louvre became a museum, and the Palais-Bourbon, a former residence of the royal family, became the home of the National Assembly. The two first covered commercial streets in Paris, the Passage du Caire and the Passage des Panoramas, were opened in 1799.

== Under Napoleon I (1800–1815) ==
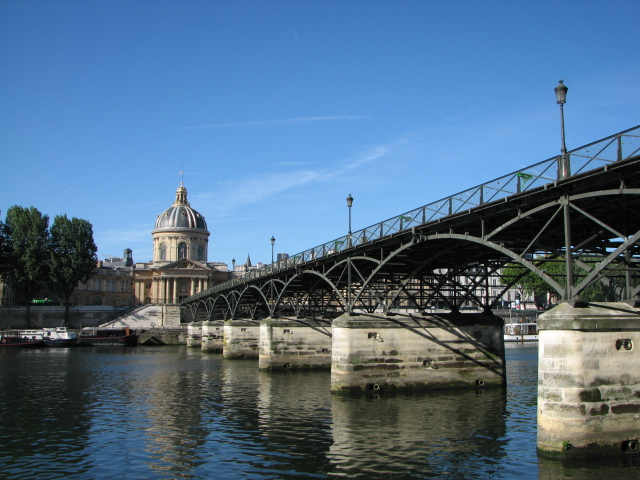
The Pont des Arts, built by Napoleon I in 1802, was the first iron bridge in Paris. The Institut de France is in the background.

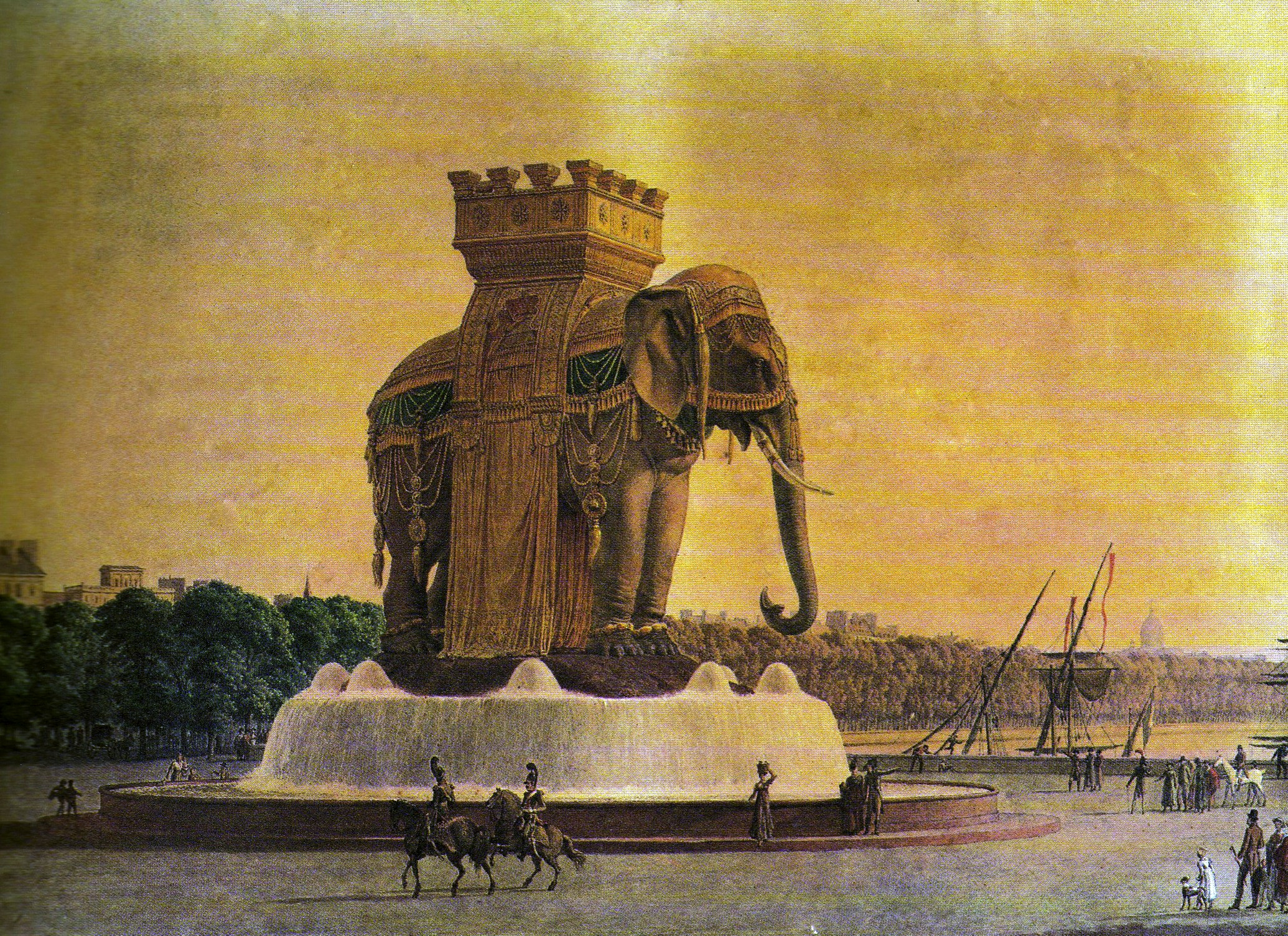
The Elephant of the Bastille, a fountain with a giant bronze elephant begun by Napoleon I in 1810, but never completed.

First Consul Napoleon Bonaparte moved into the Tuileries Palace on 19 February 1800 and immediately began to re-establish order after the years of uncertainty and terror of the Revolution. He made peace with the Catholic church by signing the Concordat of 1801 with Pope Pius VII; masses were held again in all churches. He abolished the elected position of the Mayor of Paris, and replaced it with a Prefect of the Seine appointed by him on 17 February 1800. The first prefect, Louis Nicolas Dubois, was appointed on 8 March 1800. Each of the twelve arrondissements had its own mayor, but their power was limited to enforcing the decrees of Napoleon's ministers.

After he crowned himself Emperor on 2 December 1804, Napoleon began a series of projects to make Paris into an imperial capital to rival ancient Rome. He began construction of the Rue de Rivoli. The old convent of the Capucines was demolished, and he built a new street that connected Place Vendôme to the Grands Boulevards. The street was called the "Rue Napoléon", later renamed the Rue de la Paix.

In 1802, Napoleon built a revolutionary iron bridge, the Pont des Arts, across the Seine. It was decorated with two greenhouses of exotic plants and rows of orange trees. Passage across the bridge cost one sou. He gave the names of his victories to two new bridges, the Pont d'Austerlitz (1802) and the Pont d'Iéna (1807)

In 1806, in imitation of Ancient Rome, Napoleon ordered the construction of a series of monuments dedicated to the military glory of France. The first and largest was the Arc de Triomphe, finished only in July 1836 during the July Monarchy. He ordered the building of the smaller Arc de Triomphe du Carrousel (1806–1808), copied from the arch of Arch of Septimius Severus and Constantine in Rome. It was crowned with a team of bronze horses that he took from the façade of St Mark's Basilica in Venice. The Arc de Triomphe du Carrousel is the easternmost monument of the historical axis of Paris. He also commissioned the building of the Vendôme Column (1806–1810), copied from Trajan's Column in Rome. He took the foundations of an unfinished church, the Madeleine, which had been started in 1763, and transformed it into the Temple de la Gloire, a military shrine to display the statues of France's most famous generals.

Napoleon also looked after the infrastructure of the city, which had been neglected for years. In 1802, he began construction of the Canal de l'Ourcq to bring fresh water to the city and built the Bassin de la Villette to serve as a reservoir. To distribute the fresh water to the Parisians, he built a series of monumental fountains, the largest of which was the Fontaine du Palmier, on the Place du Châtelet. He also began construction of the Canal Saint-Martin to further river transportation within the city.

Napoleon's last public project, begun in 1810, was the construction of the Elephant of the Bastille, a fountain in the shape of a colossal bronze elephant, twenty-four meters high, which was intended for the center of the Place de la Bastille, but he did not have time to finish it. An enormous plaster mockup of the elephant stood in the square for many years after the emperor's final defeat and exile. In 1811, Napoleon decreed the building of an immense palace. It was intended to eclipse every palace in Europe in size and luxury, but only the foundations had been laid before Napoleon's fall from power brought an end to the project.

== Restoration (1815–1830) ==
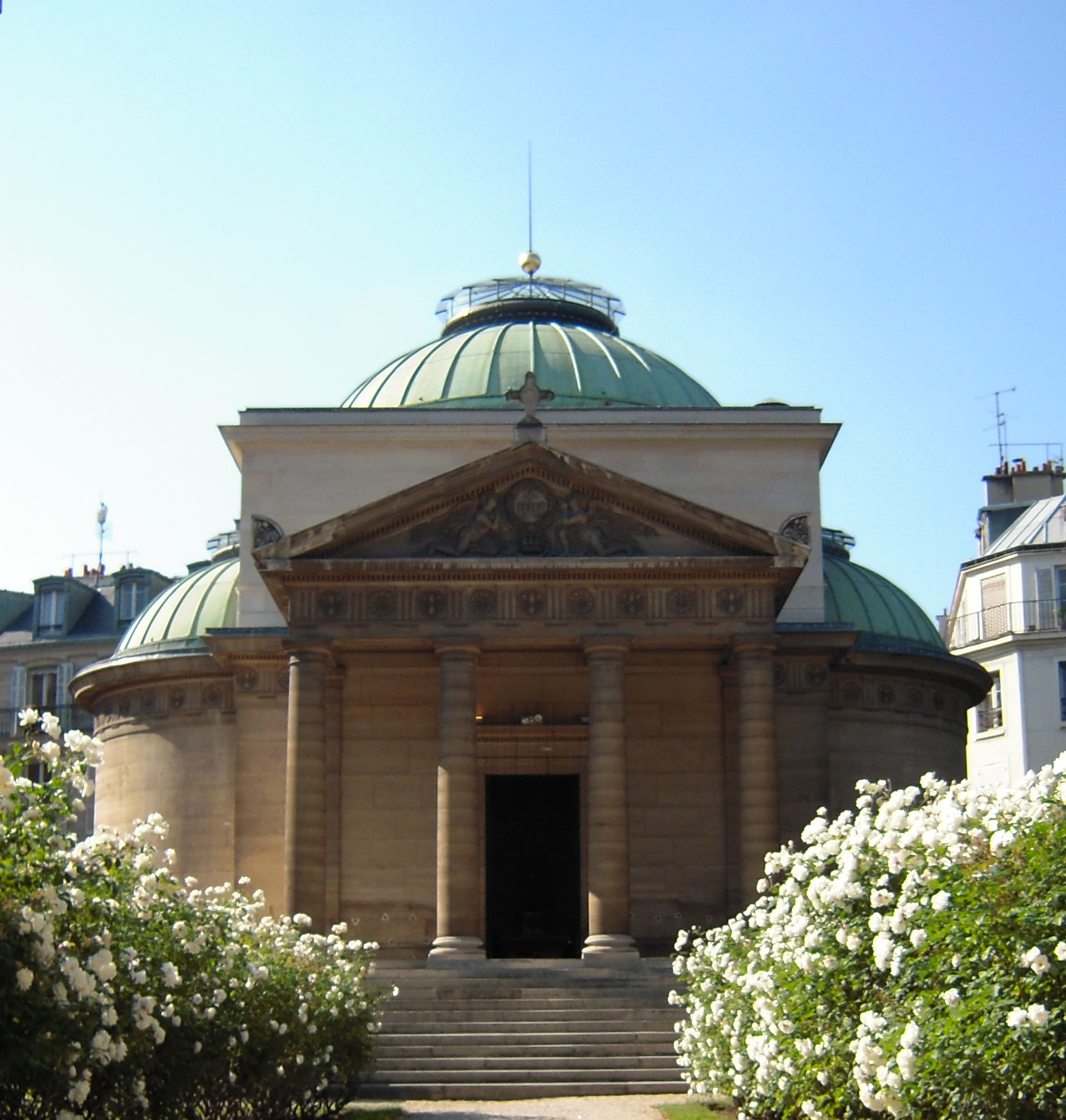
The Chapelle expiatoire was built by Louis XVIII on the site of the Madeleine cemetery, where the remains of Louis XVI and Marie Antoinette were buried after their execution.

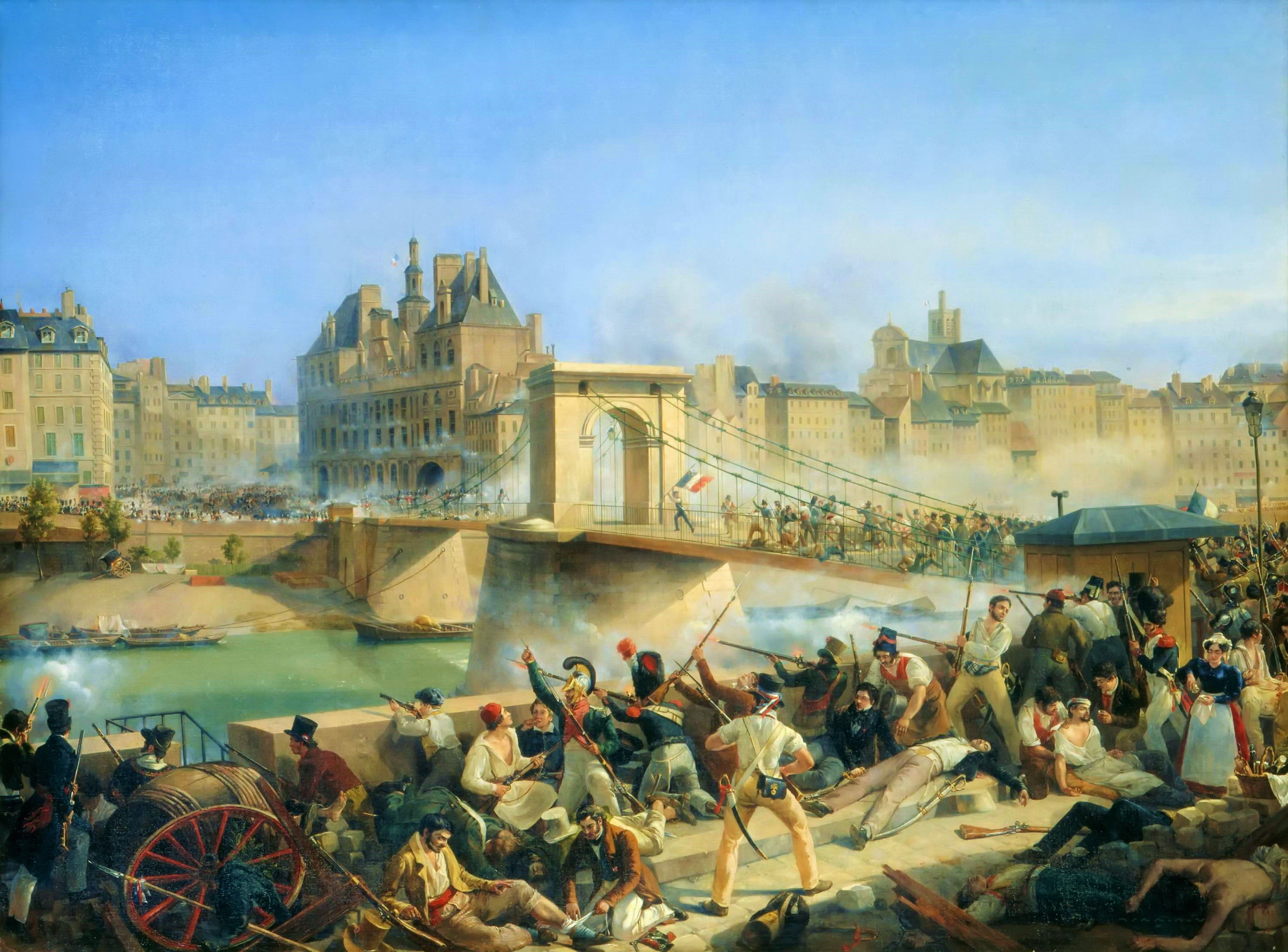
The capture of the Hôtel de Ville during the July Revolution of 1830, which brought down the regime of Charles X

Following the downfall of Napoleon after the defeat of Waterloo on 18 June 1815, 300,000 British, Austrian, Russian and Prussian soldiers of the Seventh Coalition occupied Paris until December 1815. Louis XVIII returned to the city and moved into the former apartments of Napoleon at the Tuileries Palace. The Pont de la Concorde was renamed "Pont Louis XVI", a new statue of Henry IV was put back on the empty pedestal on the Pont Neuf, and the white flag of the Bourbons flew from the top of the column in Place Vendôme.

The aristocrats who had emigrated returned to their town houses in the Faubourg Saint-Germain, and the cultural life of the city quickly resumed, though on a less extravagant scale. A new opera house was constructed on Rue Le Peletier. The Louvre was expanded in 1827 with nine new galleries that put on display the antiquities collected during Napoleon's conquest of Egypt.

Work continued on the Arc de Triomphe, and the new churches in the neoclassical style were constructed to replace those destroyed during the Revolution: Saint-Pierre-du-Gros-Caillou (1822–1830); Notre-Dame-de-Lorette (1823–1836); Notre-Dame de Bonne-Nouvelle (1828–1830); Saint-Vincent-de-Paul (1824–1844) and Saint-Denys-du-Saint-Sacrement (1826–1835). The Temple of Glory (1807) created by Napoleon to celebrate military heroes was turned back into a church, the church of La Madeleine. King Louis XVIII also built the Chapelle expiatoire, a chapel devoted to Louis XVI and Marie Antoinette, on the site of the small Madeleine cemetery, where their remains (now in the Basilica of Saint-Denis) were buried following their execution.

Paris grew quickly, reaching a population of 800,000 by 1830. Between 1828 and 1860, the city built a horse-drawn omnibus system that was the world's first mass public transit system. It greatly speeded the movement of people inside the city and became a model for other cities. The old Paris street names, carved into stone on walls, were replaced by royal blue metal plates with the street names in white letters, the model still in use today. Fashionable new neighborhoods were built on the right bank around the church of Saint-Vincent-de-Paul, the church of Notre-Dame-de-Lorette, and the Place de l’Europe. The "New Athens" neighbourhood became, during the Restoration and the July Monarchy, the home of artists and writers: the actor François-Joseph Talma lived at number 9 Rue de la Tour-des-Dames; the painter Eugène Delacroix lived at 54 Rue Notre-Dame de-Lorette; the novelist George Sand lived in the Square d'Orléans. The latter was a private community that opened at 80 Rue Taitbout, which had forty-six apartments and three artists' studios. Sand lived on the first floor of number 5, while Frédéric Chopin lived for a time on the ground floor of number 9.

Louis XVIII was succeeded by his brother Charles X in 1824, but new the government became increasingly unpopular with both the upper classes and the general population of Paris. The play Hernani (1830) by the twenty-eight-year-old Victor Hugo, caused disturbances and fights in the theater audience because of its calls for freedom of expression. On 26 July, Charles X signed decrees limiting freedom of the press and dissolving the Parliament, provoking demonstrations which turned into riots which turned into a general uprising. After three days, known as the ‘’Trois Glorieuses’’, the army joined the demonstrators. Charles X, his family and the court left the Château de Saint-Cloud, and, on 31 July, the Marquis de Lafayette and the new constitutional monarch Louis Philippe I raised the tricolor flag again before cheering crowds at the Hôtel de Ville.

== Under Louis-Philippe (1830–1848) ==
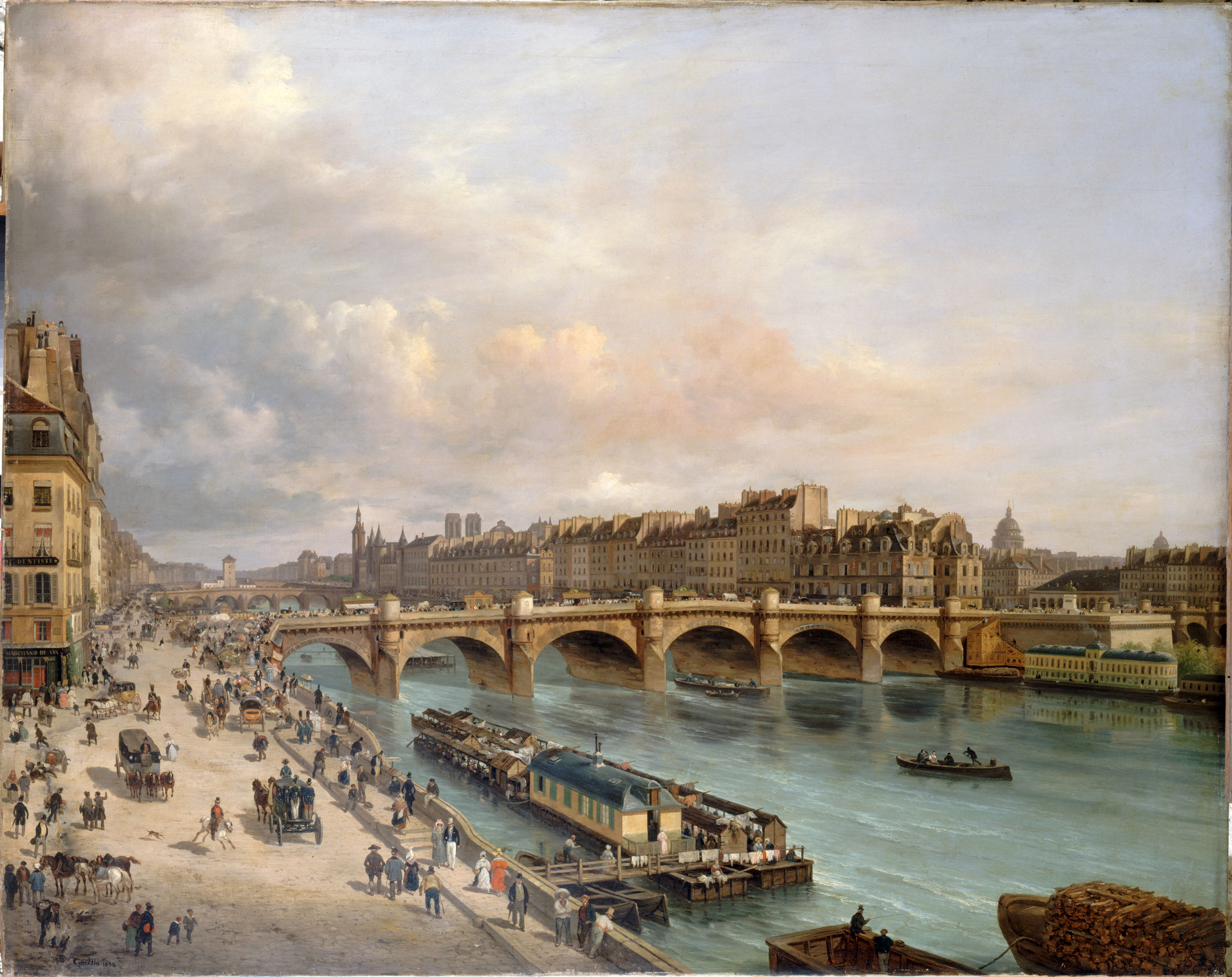
Giuseppe Canella, The Pont Neuf in 1832, Carnavalet Museum

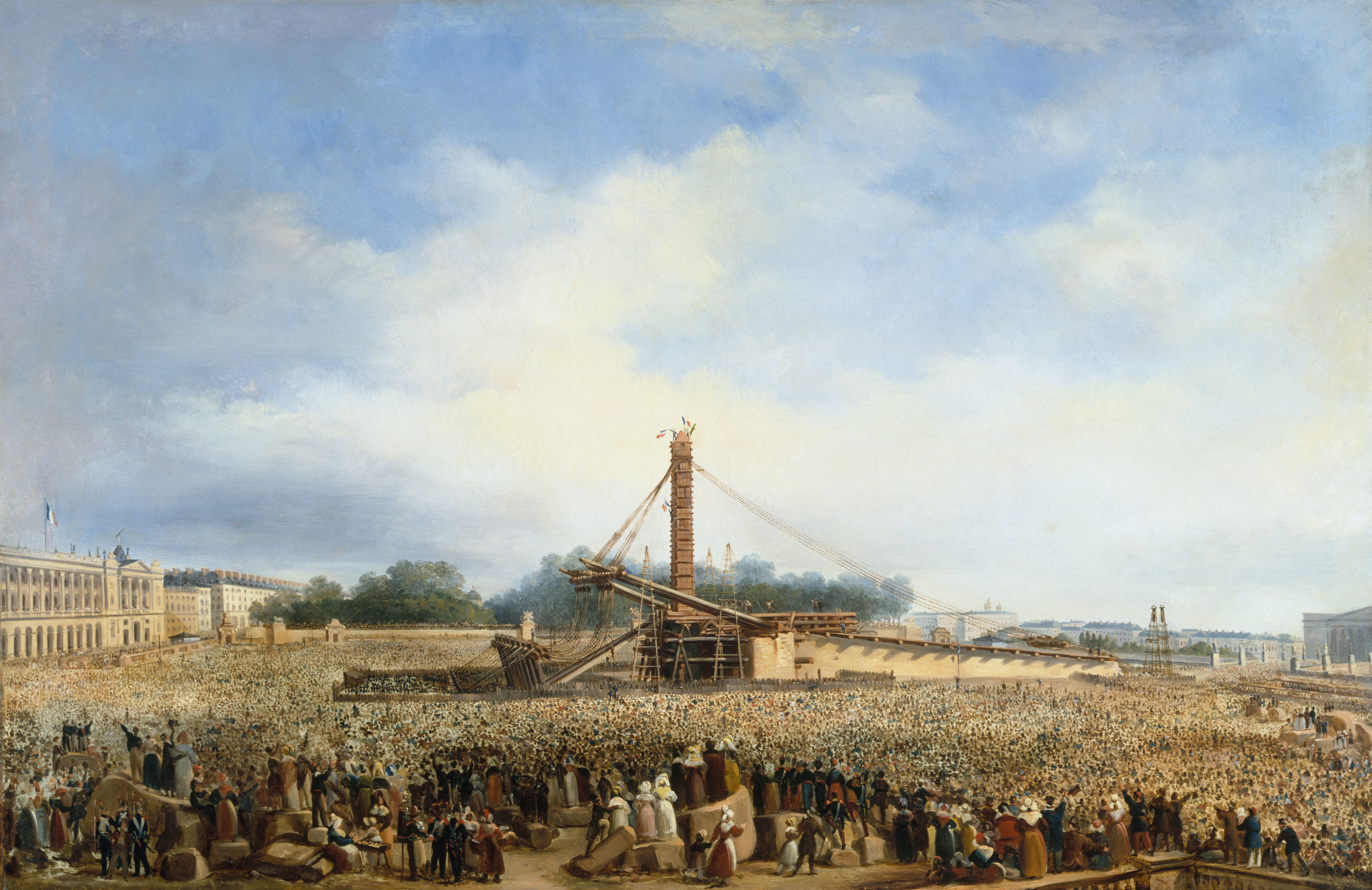
A crowd of 200,000 people watched as the Luxor Obelisk was hoisted in the center of the Place de la Concorde on 25 October 1836 (as depicted by François Dubois in a painting of 1836 housed in the Carnavalet Museum).

The Paris of King Louis Philippe I was the city described in the novels of Honoré de Balzac and Victor Hugo. The population of Paris increased from 785,000 in 1831 to 1,053,000 in 1848, as the city grew to the north and west, but the poorest neighborhoods in the center became even more densely crowded.

The heart the city, around the Île de la Cité, was a maze of narrow, winding streets and crumbling buildings from earlier centuries; it was picturesque, but dark, crowded, unhealthy and dangerous. Water was distributed by porters carrying buckets from a pole on their shoulders, and the sewers emptied directly into the Seine. A cholera outbreak in 1832 killed twenty thousand people. The Comte de Rambuteau, the Prefect of the Seine for fifteen years under Louis-Philippe, made tentative efforts to improve the center of the city: he paved the quays of the Seine with stone paths and planted trees along the river. He built a new street (now the Rue Rambuteau) to connect the Le Marais district with the markets and began construction of Les Halles, the famous central market of Paris, which was finished by Napoleon III.

Louis-Philippe lived in the ancestral Orléans family residence of the House of Orléans, the Palais-Royal, until 1832, before moving to the Tuileries Palace. His chief contribution to the monuments of Paris was the completion of the Place de la Concorde in 1836: the huge square was decorated with two fountains, one representing fluvial commerce, Fontaine des Fleuves, and the other maritime commerce, Fontaine des Mers, and eight statues of women representing eight great cities of France: Brest and Rouen (by Jean-Pierre Cortot), Lyon and Marseille (by Pierre Petitot), Bordeaux and Nantes (by Louis-Denis Caillouette), Lille and Strasbourg (by James Pradier). The statue of Strasbourg was a likeness of Juliette Drouet, the mistress of Victor Hugo. The Place de la Concorde was further embellished on 25 October 1836 by the placement of the Luxor Obelisk, weighing two hundred fifty tons, which was carried to France from Egypt on a specially built ship. In the same year, at the westernmost end of the Champs-Élysées, Louis-Philippe completed and dedicated the Arc de Triomphe, which had been begun by Napoleon.

The ashes of Napoleon were returned to Paris from Saint Helena in a solemn ceremony on 15 December 1840 at the Invalides. Louis-Philippe also placed the statue of Napoleon atop the column in the Place Vendôme. In 1840, he completed a column in the Place de la Bastille dedicated to the July 1830 revolution that had brought him to power. He also began the restoration of the churches of Paris damaged during the French Revolution, a project carried out by the architectural historian Eugène Viollet-le-Duc, beginning with the church of the Abbey of Saint-Germain-des-Prés. Between 1837 and 1841, he built a new Hôtel de Ville with an interior salon decorated by Eugène Delacroix.

The first railway stations in Paris were built under Louis-Philippe. Each belonged to a different company. They were not connected to each other and were outside the center of the city. The first, called the Embarcadère de Saint-Germain-en-Laye, was opened on 24 August 1837 on the Place de l'Europe. An early version of the Gare Saint-Lazare was begun in 1842, and the first lines Paris-Orléans and Paris-Rouen were inaugurated on 1 and 2 May 1843.

As the population of Paris grew, so did discontent in the working-class neighborhoods. There were riots in 1830, 1831, 1832, 1835, 1839 and 1840. The 1832 uprising, following the funeral of a fierce critic of Louis-Philippe, General Jean Maximilien Lamarque, was immortalized in Victor Hugo's novel Les Misérables.

The growing unrest finally exploded on 23 February 1848, when a large demonstration was broken up by the army. Barricades went up in the eastern working-class neighborhoods. The king reviewed his soldiers in front of the Tuileries Palace, but, instead of cheering him, many shouted "Long Live Reform!" Discouraged, he abdicated and went into exile in England.

== The Second Republic and under Napoleon III (1848–1870) ==
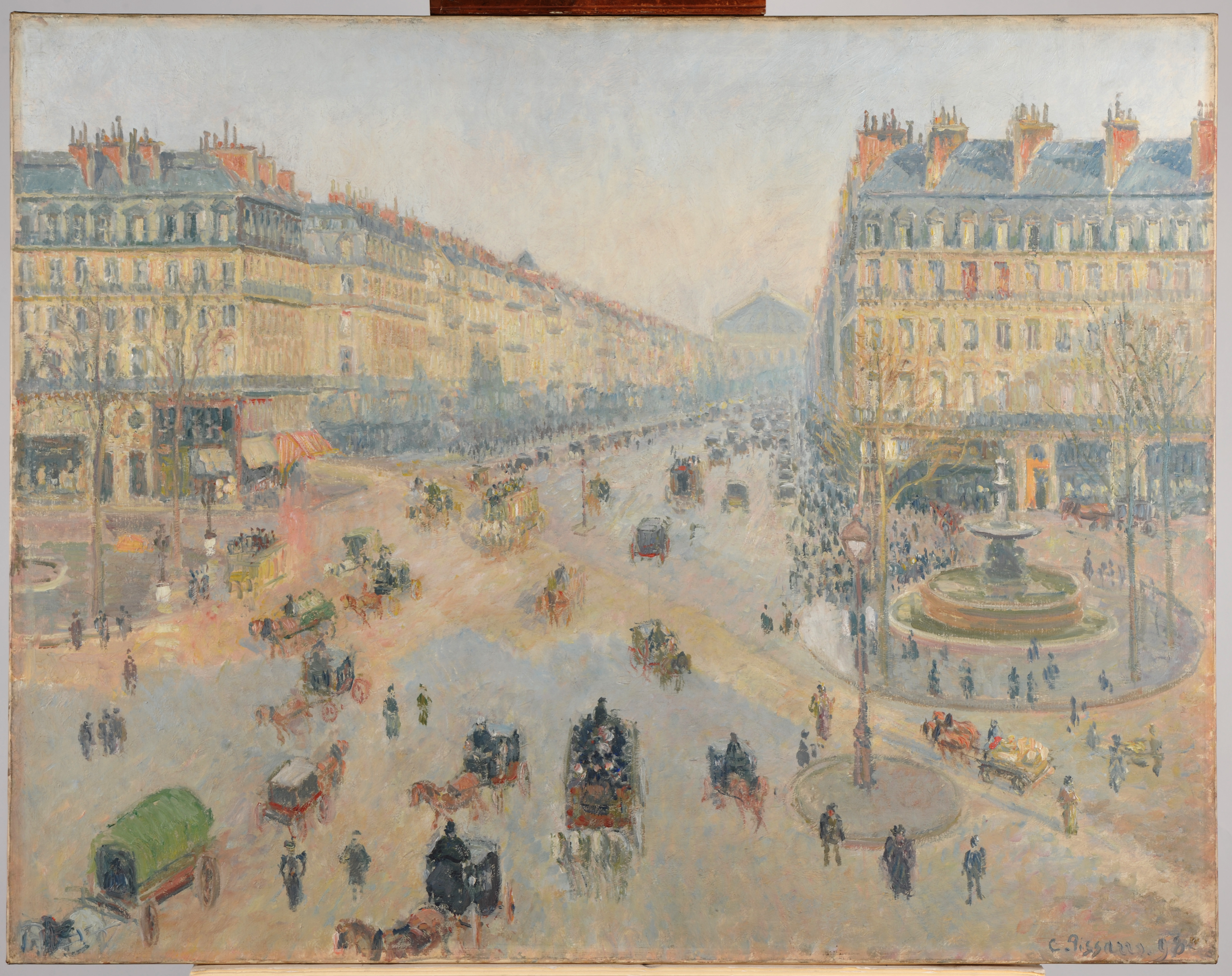
Camille Pissarro, Avenue de l'Opéra, 1898, Museum of Fine Arts, Rheims. The Avenue de l'Opéra was built on the orders of Napoleon III. His Prefect of the Seine, Baron Haussmann, required that the buildings on the new boulevards be the same height, same style, and be faced with cream-colored stone, as these are.

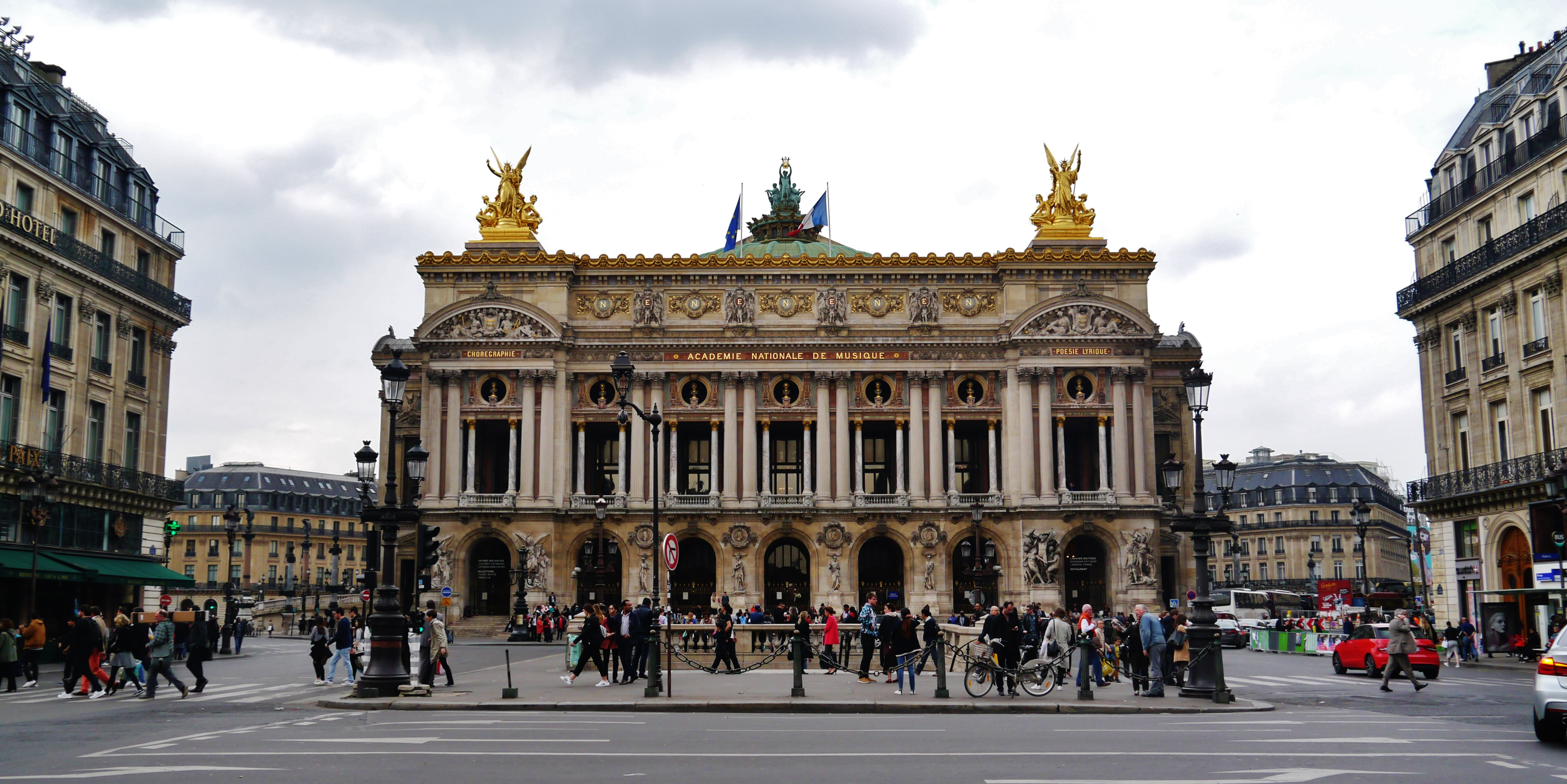
The Paris Opera was the centerpiece of Napoleon III's new Paris. Its architect Charles Garnier described the style simply as "Napoleon the Third".

In December 1848, Louis-Napoleon Bonaparte, the nephew of Napoleon I, became the first elected President of France, winning seventy-four percent of the vote. Because of the sharp divisions between monarchists and republicans, the "Prince-President" was able to accomplish little, and he was prevented by the Constitution from running for re-election. In December 1851, he organized a coup d'état, dismissed the Parliament, and on 2 December 1852, after winning approval in a national referendum, became Emperor Napoleon III.

At the beginning of Napoleon's reign, Paris had a population of about one million people, most of whom lived in crowded and unhealthy conditions. A cholera epidemic in the overcrowded center in 1848 killed twenty thousand people. In 1853, Napoleon launched a gigantic public works program under the direction of his new Prefect of the Seine, Georges-Eugène Haussmann, whose purpose was to put unemployed Parisians to work and bring clean water, light and open space to the centre of the city.

Napoleon began by enlarging the city limits beyond the twelve arrondissements established in 1795. The towns around Paris had resisted becoming part of the city, fearing higher taxes; Napoleon used his new imperial power to annex them, adding eight new arrondissements to the city and bringing it to its present size. Over the next seventeen years, Napoleon and Haussmann transformed entirely the appearance of Paris. They demolished most of the old neighborhoods on the Île de la Cité, replacing them with a new Palais de Justice and prefecture of police, and rebuilding the old city hospital, the Hôtel-Dieu. They completed the extension of the Rue de Rivoli, begun by Napoleon I, and built a network of wide boulevards to connect the railway stations and neighborhoods of the city to improve traffic circulation and create open space around the city's monuments. The new boulevards also made it harder to build barricades in the neighborhoods prone to uprisings and revolutions, but, as Haussmann himself wrote, this was not the main purpose of the boulevards. Haussmann imposed strict standards on the new buildings along the new boulevards; they had to be the same height, follow the same basic design, and be faced in a creamy white stone. These standards gave central Paris the street plan and distinctive look it still retains today.

Napoleon III also wanted to give the Parisians, particularly those in the outer neighborhoods, access to green space for recreation and relaxation. He was inspired by Hyde Park in London, which he had often visited when he was in exile there. He ordered the construction of four large new parks at the four cardinal points of the compass around the city; the Bois de Boulogne to the west; the Bois de Vincennes to the east; the Parc des Buttes-Chaumont to the north; and Parc Montsouris to the south, plus many smaller parks and squares around the city, so that no neighbourhood was more than a ten-minute walk from a park.

Napoleon III and Haussmann rebuilt two major railway stations, the Gare de Lyon and the Gare du Nord, to make them monumental gateways to the city. They improved the sanitation of the city by building new sewers and water mains under the streets and built a new reservoir and aqueduct to increase the supply of fresh water. In addition, they installed tens of thousands of gaslights to illuminate the streets and monuments. They began construction of the Palais Garnier for the Paris Opera and built two new theaters at the Place du Châtelet to replace those in the old theater district of the Boulevard du Temple, known as "The Boulevard of Crime", which had been demolished to make room for the new boulevards. They completely rebuilt the central market of the city, Les Halles, built the first railway bridge over the Seine, and also built the monumental Fontaine Saint-Michel at the beginning of the new Boulevard Saint-Michel. They also redesigned the street architecture of Paris, installing new street lamps, kiosks, omnibus stops and public toilets (called "chalets of necessity"), which were specially designed by the city architect Gabriel Davioud, and which gave the Paris boulevards their distinct harmony and look.

In the late 1860s, Napoleon III decided to liberalize his regime and gave greater freedom and power to the legislature. Haussmann became the chief target of criticism in the parliament, blamed for the unorthodox ways in which he financed his projects, for amputating four hectares from the thirty hectares of the Luxembourg Gardens in order to make room for new streets, and for the general inconvenience his projects caused to Parisians for nearly two decades. In January 1870, Napoleon was forced to dismiss him. A few months later, Napoleon was drawn into the Franco-Prussian War, then defeated and captured at the Battle of Sedan of 1–2 September 1870, but the work on Haussmann's boulevards continued during the Third Republic, which was established immediately after Napoleon's defeat and abdication, until they were finally finished in 1927.

=== Economy ===
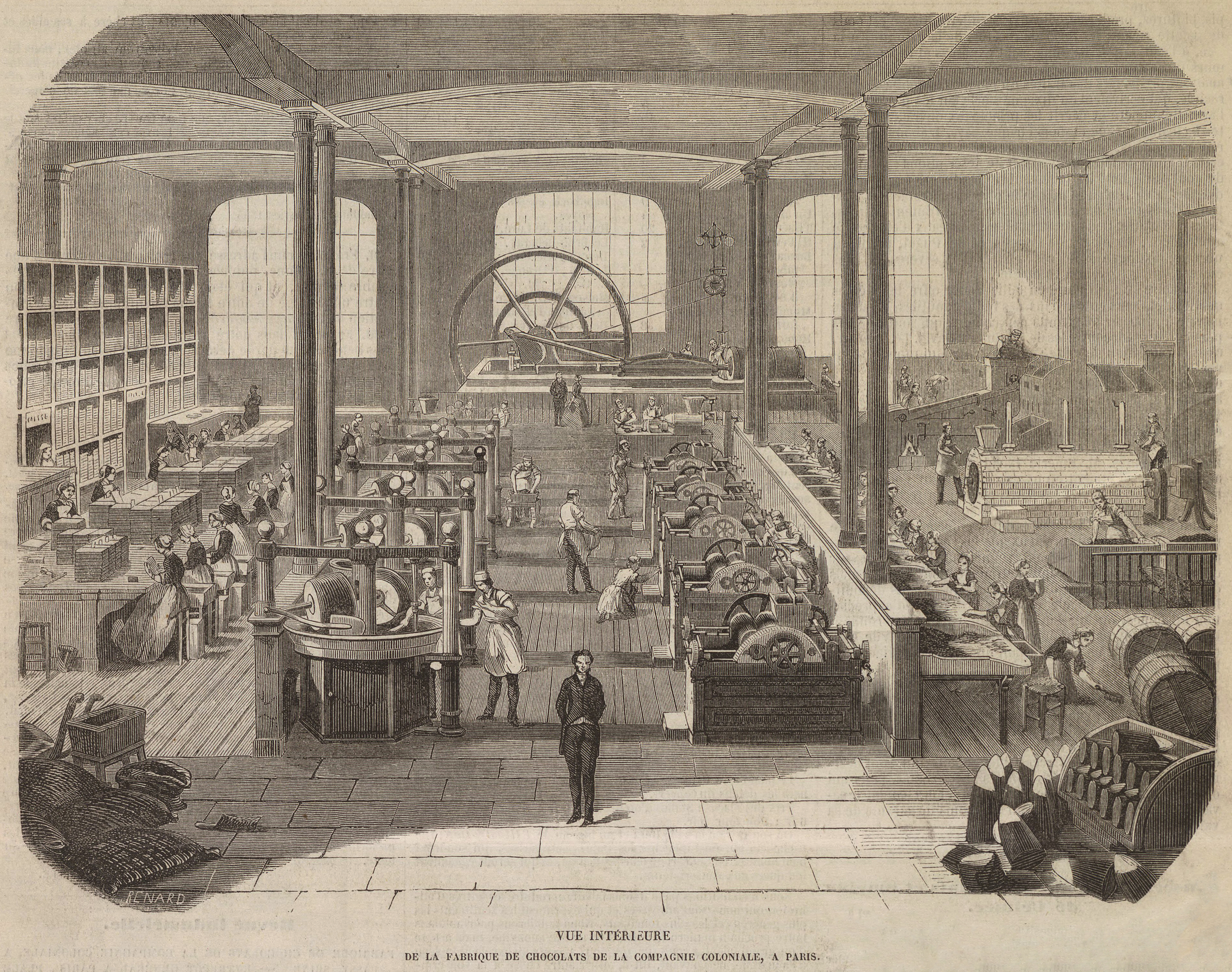
The Paris chocolate factory of the Compagnie Coloniale in 1855

The first large-scale industries arrived in Paris during the reign of Napoleon. They flourished in the outskirts of the city, where buildings and land, often taken from churches and convents closed during the French Revolution, were available. Large textile mills were built in the Faubourg Saint-Antoine and the Faubourg Saint-Denis, and the first sugar refinery using sugar beets was opened in Passy in 1812 to supplant West Indian sugar that could no longer be shipped to France due to British naval blockades. Iron and bronze foundries had been started late in the 18th century in the Faubourg Saint-Honoré and Chaillot, and early chemical works in Javel, La Chapelle and Clignancourt. In 1801, Paris had nine hundred enterprises that employed 60,000 workers, but only twenty-four enterprises had more than 100 workers. Most Parisians were employed in small workshops. Paris in the 19th century had many artisans producing luxury goods, particularly clothing, watches, fine furniture, porcelain, jewelry and leather goods, which commanded premium prices on the world market. Throughout the 19th century, the amount of industry and number of workers increased. In 1847, there were 350,000 workers in Paris in 65,000 enterprises, but only 7,000 enterprises had more than ten workers. The textile industry declined, but at mid-century Paris produced 20 percent of the steam engines and machinery in France and had the third largest metallurgy industry. New chemical plants, highly polluting, appeared around the edges of the city in Javel, Grenelle, Passy, Clichy, Belleville and Pantin.

Paris emerged as an international center of finance in the mid-19th century second only to London. It had a strong national bank and numerous aggressive private banks that financed projects all across Europe and the expanding Second French Empire. Napoleon III had the goal of overtaking London to make Paris the premier financial center of the world, but the war in 1870-71 hit finance hard and sharply reduced the range of the financial influence of Paris. One major development was the establishment of one of the main branches of the Rothschild family. In 1812, James Mayer Rothschild arrived in Paris from Frankfurt and set up the bank Rothschild Frères. This bank helped fund Napoleon I's brief return from Elba and became one of the leading banks in European finance. The Rothschild banking family of France, along with other new investment banks, funded some of France's industrial and colonial expansion. The Banque de France, founded in 1796, helped resolve the financial crisis of 1848 and emerged as a powerful central bank. The Comptoir National d'Escompte de Paris (CNEP) was established during the financial crisis and republican revolution of 1848. Its innovations included both private and public sources in funding large projects and the creation of a network of local offices to reach a much larger pool of depositors. Other major banks included the Société Générale and the Crédit Mobilier. The Crédit Lyonnais began in Lyon and moved to Paris.

The Paris Bourse (or stock exchange) emerged as a key market for investors to buy and sell securities. It was primarily a forward market, and it pioneered the creation of a mutual guarantee fund so that failures of major brokers would not escalate into a devastating financial crisis. Speculators in the 1880s, who disliked the control of the Bourse, used a less regulated alternative, the "Coulisse". However it collapsed in the face of the simultaneous failure of a number of its brokers in 1895–1896. The Bourse secured legislation that guaranteed its monopoly, increased control of the curb market, and reduced the risk of another financial panic.

== The Siege of Paris and the Commune (1870–1871) ==
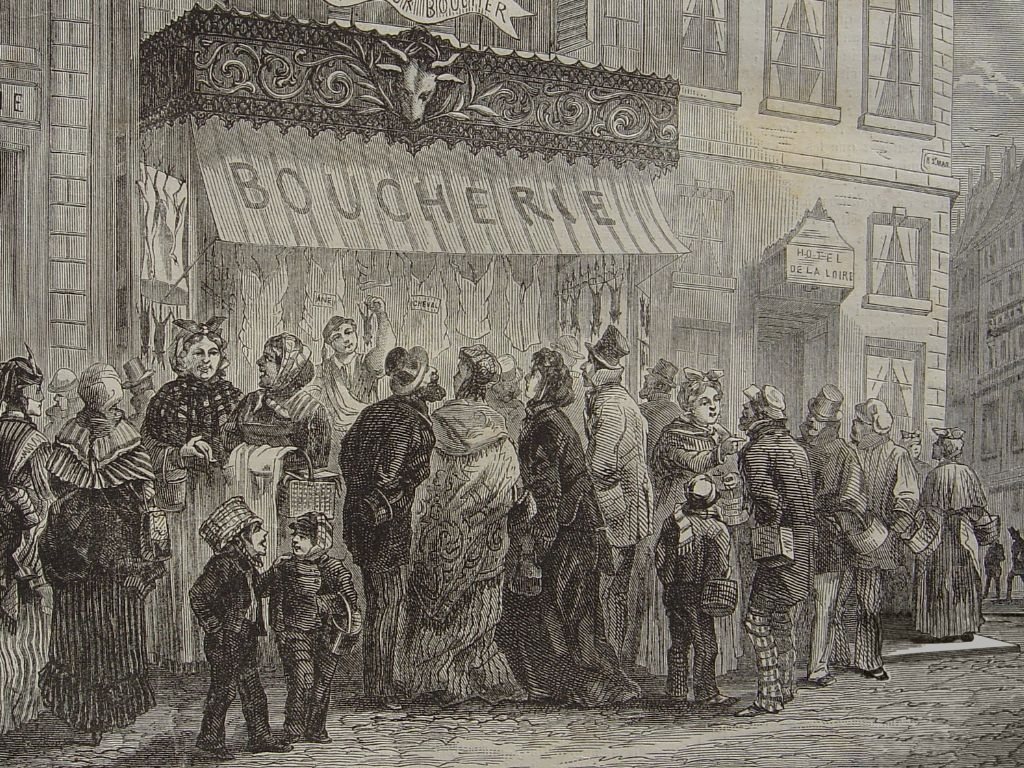
Crowd outside a butcher shop during the siege of Paris (1871)

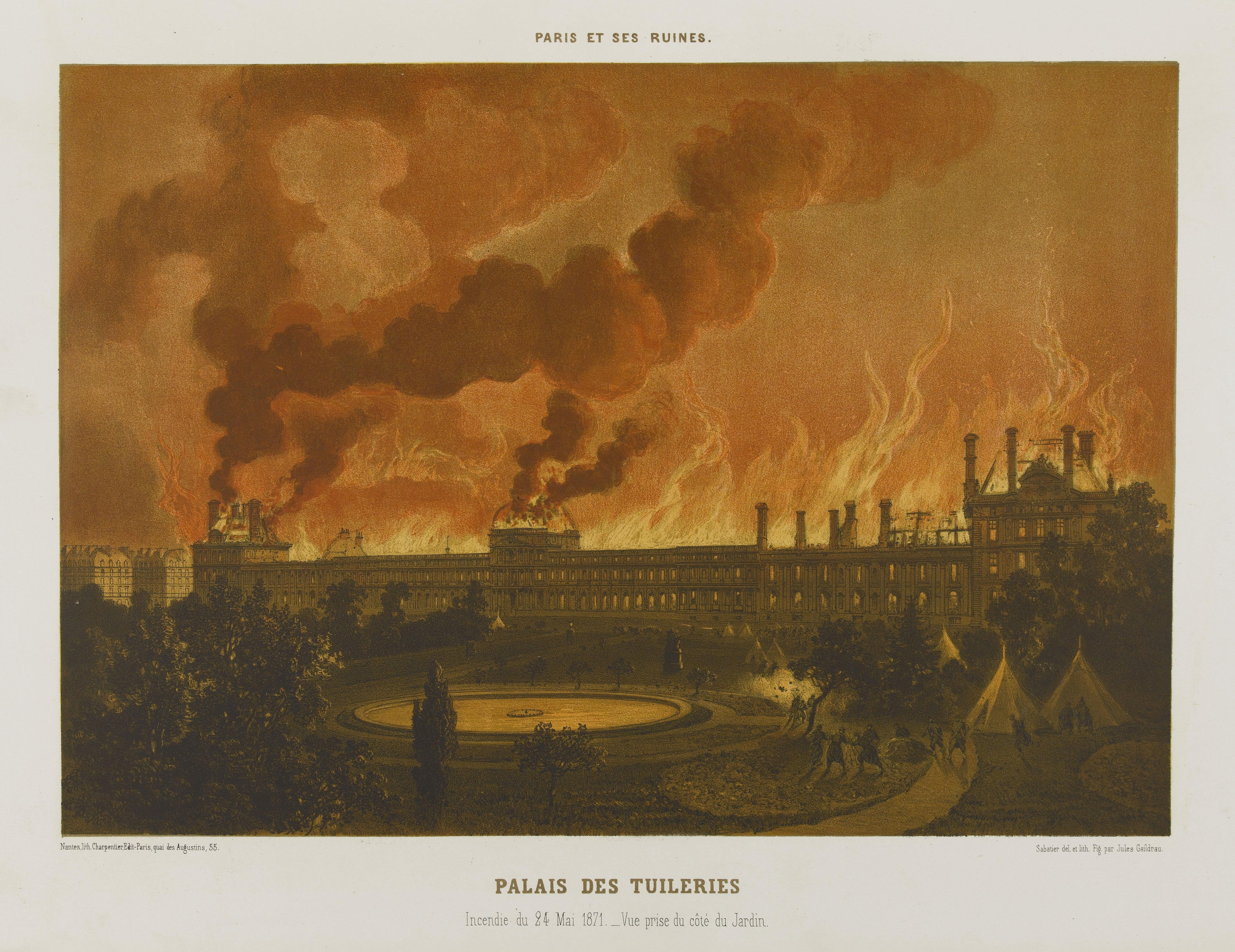
In the last days of the Paris Commune, the Tuileries Palace was set afire by the Communards and completely destroyed.

The rule of Napoleon III came to an abrupt end when he was defeated and captured at the Battle of Sedan of 1–2 September 1870 at the end of the Franco-Prussian War. He abdicated on 4 September, with the Third Republic proclaimed that same day in Paris. On 19 September, the Prussian army arrived at Paris and besieged the city until January 1871. During the siege, the city suffered from cold and hunger. Cats, rats, dogs, horses, and other animals were killed for food, even Castor and Pollux, the two elephants of the zoo, as well as the elephant at the Jardin des Plantes. In January 1871, the Prussians began the bombardment of the city with heavy siege guns, and the city finally surrendered on 28 January. The Prussians briefly occupied the city and then took up positions nearby.

A revolt broke out on 18 March 1871, when radicalized soldiers from the Paris National Guard killed two French generals. Government officials and the army withdrew quickly to Versailles, and a new city council, the Paris Commune, dominated by anarchists and radical socialists, was elected and took power on March 26. The Commune tried to implement an ambitious and radical social program, but held power for only two months. Between May 21 and 28, the French army reconquered the city in bitter fighting in what became known as the semaine sanglante ("Bloody Week"). During the street fighting, the Communards were outnumbered four or five to one; they lacked competent officers and had no plan for the defense of the city, so each neighborhood was left to defend itself. Their military commander, Louis Charles Delescluze, committed suicide by dramatically standing atop a barricade on May 26. In the final days of the battle, the Communards set fire to the Tuileries Palace, the Hôtel de Ville, the Palais de Justice, the Palace of the Legion of Honor, besides other prominent government buildings, and executed hostages they had taken, including Georges Darboy, the archbishop of Paris.

Army casualties from the beginning of April through the Bloody Week amounted to 837 dead and 6,424 wounded. Nearly 7,000 Communards were killed in combat or summarily executed by army firing squads afterwards. They were buried in the city cemeteries and in temporary mass graves. About 10,000 Communards escaped and went into exile in Belgium, England, Switzerland and the United States. Of the 45,000 prisoners taken after the fall of the Commune, most were released, but 23 were sentenced to death, and about 10,000 were sentenced to prison or deportation to New Caledonia or other prison colonies. All the prisoners and exiles were amnestied in 1879 and 1880 and most returned to France, where some were elected to the National Assembly.

== Belle Époque (1871–1914) ==
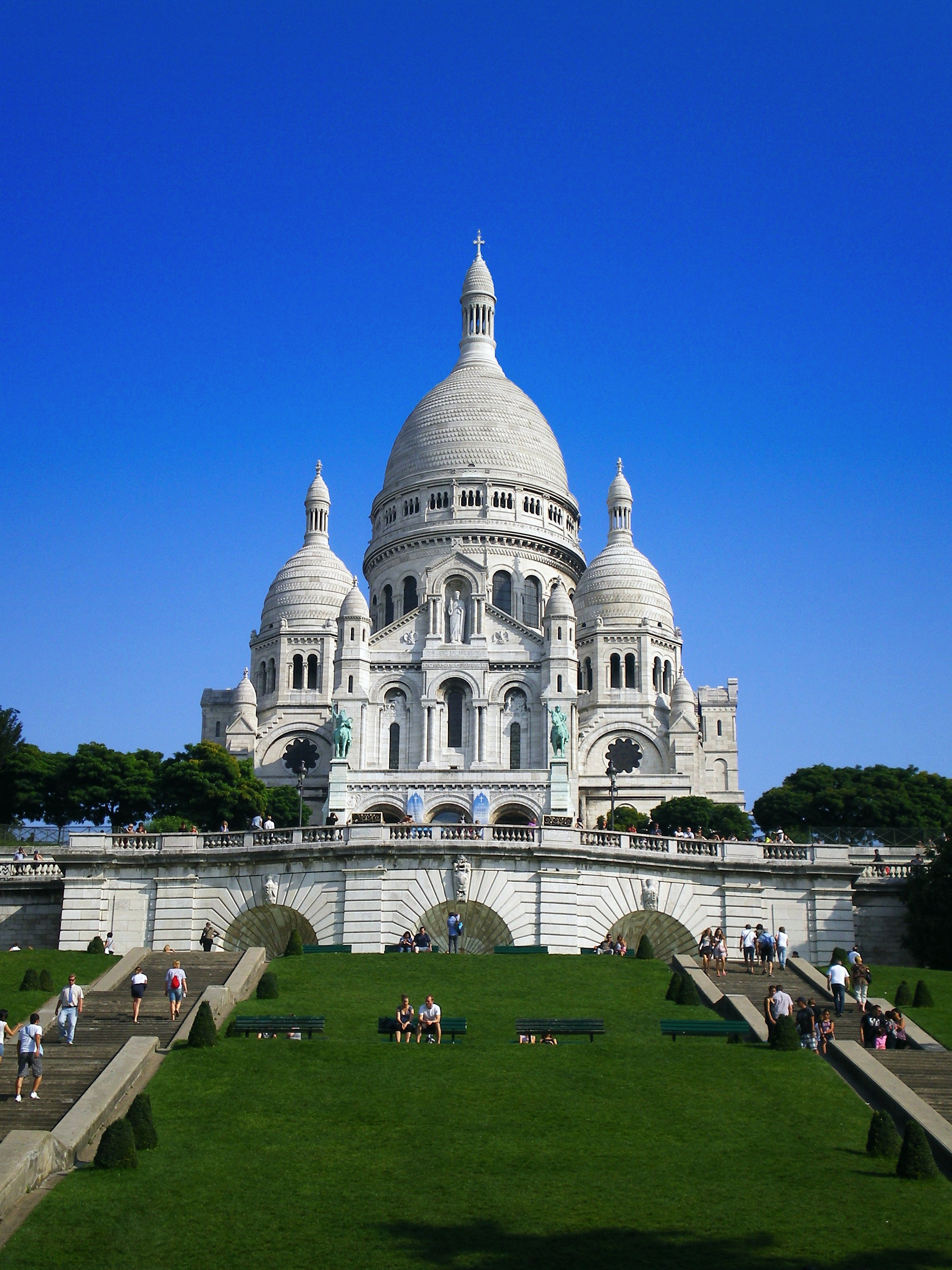
The Basilica of Sacré-Cœur on Montmartre, built in neo-Byzantine style, was begun in 1873, but not finished until 1919. It was intended to atone for abuses committed during the period of the Franco-Prussian War and the Paris Commune.

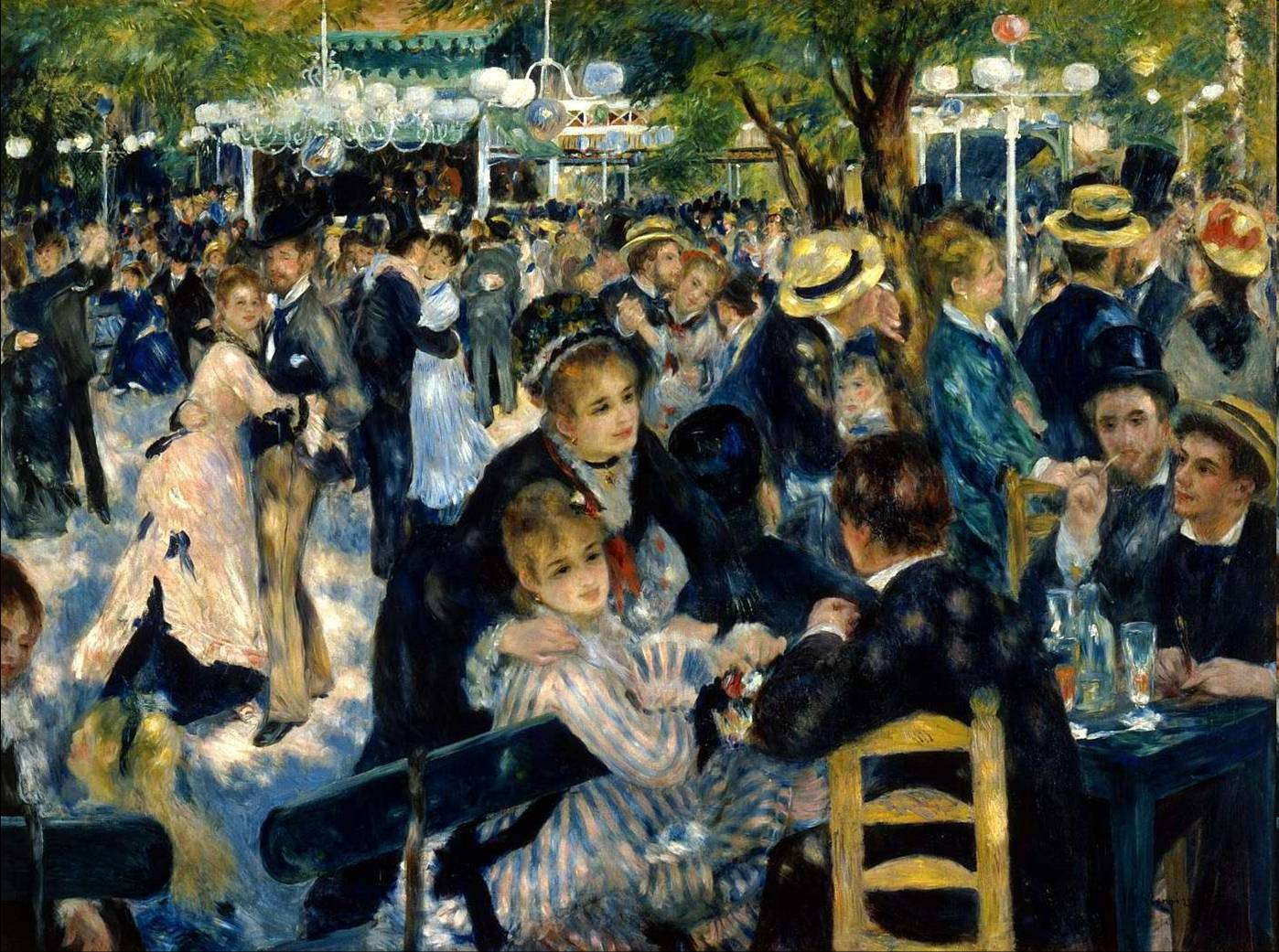
Pierre-Auguste Renoir, Bal du moulin de la Galette, 1876, Musée d'Orsay, depicts a Sunday afternoon dance in Montmartre. Paris became the birthplace of modern art during the Belle Époque.

After the fall of the Commune, Paris was governed under the strict surveillance of the conservative national government. The government and parliament did not return to the city from Versailles until 1879, although the Senate returned earlier to its seat in the Luxembourg Palace. On 23 July 1873, the National Assembly endorsed the project of building a basilica at the site where the uprising of the Paris Commune had begun; it was intended to atone for the sufferings of Paris during the Franco-Prussian War and the Commune. The Basilica of Sacré-Cœur was built in a neo-Byzantine style and paid for by public subscription. It was not finished until 1919, but quickly became one of the most recognizable landmarks in Paris.

Radical Republicans dominated the Paris municipal elections of 1878, winning 75 of the 80 municipal council seats. In 1879, they changed the name of many of the Paris streets and squares: the Place du Château-d’Eau became the Place de la République, and a statue of the Republic was placed in the centre in 1883. The avenues de la Reine-Hortense, Joséphine and Roi-de-Rome were renamed Hoche, Marceau and Kléber, after generals who served during the period of the French Revolution. The Hôtel de Ville was rebuilt between 1874 and 1882 in the neo-Renaissance style, with towers modelled after those of the Château de Chambord. The ruins of the Cour des Comptes on the Quai d'Orsay, burned by the Communards, were demolished and replaced by a new railway station, the Gare d'Orsay (today's Musée d'Orsay). The walls of the Tuileries Palace were still standing. Baron Haussmann, Hector Lefuel and Eugène Viollet-le-Duc pleaded for the rebuilding of the palace but, in 1879, the city council decided against it, because the former palace was a symbol of monarchy. In 1883, it had the ruins pulled down. Only the Pavillon de Marsan (north) and the Pavillon de Flore (south) were restored.

The most memorable Parisian civic event during the period was the funeral of Victor Hugo in 1885. Hundreds of thousands of Parisians lined the Champs Élysées to see the passage of his coffin. The Arc de Triomphe was draped in black. The remains of the writer were placed in the Panthéon, formerly the church of Saint-Geneviève, which had been turned into a mausoleum for great Frenchmen during the Revolution of 1789, then turned back into a church in April 1816, during the Bourbon Restoration. After several changes during the 19th century, it was secularised again in 1885 on the occasion of Victor Hugo's funeral.

=== Transport ===
At the end of the century, Paris began to modernise its public transport system to try to catch up with London. The first metro line was begun in 1897 between the Porte Maillot and the Porte de Vincennes. It was finished in time for the 1900 Universal Exposition. Two new bridges were built over the Seine. One was the Pont Alexandre III, which connected the left bank with the site of the 1900 Exposition. Its cornerstone was laid in 1896 by Emperor Nicholas II of Russia, who, in 1894, had succeeded his father, Alexander III of Russia. The new avenue between the bridge and the Champs Élysées was first named the Avenue Alexandre III, then Avenue Nicolas II, and again Avenue Alexandre III until 1966, when it was finally renamed Avenue Winston-Churchill. The same engineers who built the modern iron structure of the Pont Alexandre III also built the Pont Mirabeau, which connected Auteuil and Javel.

=== Modern art ===
In the late 19th and early 20th century, Paris became the birthplace of modern art and public cinema projections. Many notable artists lived and worked in Paris during the Belle Époque, often in Montmartre, where rents were low and the atmosphere congenial. Auguste Renoir rented space at 12 Rue Cartot in 1876 to paint his Bal du moulin de la Galette, which depicts a dance at Montmartre on a Sunday afternoon. Maurice Utrillo lived at the same address from 1906 to 1914, and Raoul Dufy shared an atelier there from 1901 to 1911. The building is now the Musée de Montmartre. Pablo Picasso, Amedeo Modigliani and other artists lived and worked in a building called Le Bateau-Lavoir from 1904 to 1909. In this building, Picasso painted one of his most important masterpieces, Les Demoiselles d'Avignon.

Several noted composers, including Erik Satie, also lived in this neighborhood. Most of the artists left after the outbreak of World War I, the majority of them to take up residence in the Montparnasse quarter.

On 25 December 1895, the Grand Café on the Boulevard des Capucines was the location of the first public projection of a motion picture, this one produced by the Lumière Brothers. Thirty-three spectators paid one franc each to see a series of short films, beginning with a film of workers leaving the Lumière brothers' factory in Lyon.

At the outset of the 20th century, Henri Matisse and several other artists, including the pre-cubists Georges Braque, André Derain, Raoul Dufy, Jean Metzinger and Maurice de Vlaminck, revolutionized the Paris art world with "wild", multi-coloured, expressive landscapes and figure paintings that critics referred to as Fauvism. Henri Matisse's two versions of The Dance signified a key point in his career and in the development of modern painting.

=== Consumerism and the department store ===
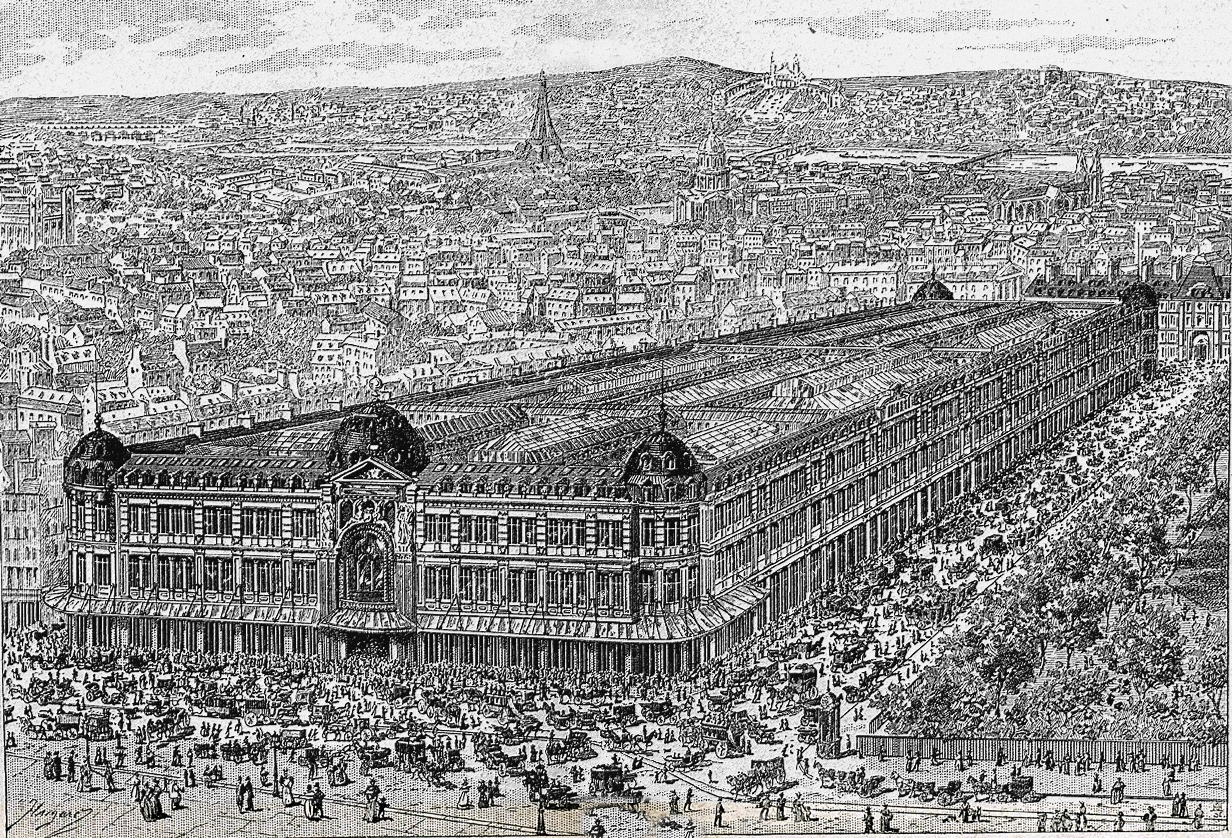
Au Bon Marché department store

In late 19th- and early 20th-century Paris, wealth was growing rapidly, and it became increasingly concentrated. Paris from 1872 to 1927 was a "rentier society". Rentiers (that is, people who relied primarily on inherited wealth) made up about 10% of the population, but owned 70% of aggregate wealth; they spent heavily on luxuries as their income from capital assets could sustain a living standard far beyond what labor income alone would permit. Paris became world-famous for making consumerism a social priority and economic force, especially through its grand department stores and upscale arcades filled with luxury shops. These were "dream machines" that set the world standard for consumption of fine products by the upper classes as well as the rising middle class. Aristide Boucicaut, the son of a small clothing-shop owner, became partner in a variety store called Le Bon Marché in Paris in 1848. He became owner in 1852 and transformed it into the first modern department store in Paris with high-volume buying, low profit margins, seasonal sales, discounts, advertising, a mail-order catalog, and entertainment and prizes for customers, spouses and children. Goods were sold at fixed prices with guarantees that allowed exchanges and refunds. It became the model for other Paris department stores, including La Samaritaine, Printemps and Galeries Lafayette.

The French gloried in the national prestige brought by the great Parisian stores. Émile Zola set his novel Au Bonheur des Dames (1882–83) in a typical department store, based on research he did at Le Bon Marché in 1880. Zola represented it as a symbol of the new technology that was both improving society and devouring it. The novel describes merchandising, management techniques, marketing, and consumerism.

The Grands Magasins Dufayel was a department store built in 1890 in the northern part of Paris, where it reached a large customer base in the working class. In a neighborhood with few public spaces, it provided a consumer version of the public square. It educated workers to approach shopping as an exciting social activity, not just a routine exercise in obtaining necessities, in the same way as the bourgeoisie did at the famous department stores in the central city. Like the bourgeois stores, it helped transform consumption from a business transaction into a direct relationship between consumer and sought-after goods. Its advertisements promised the opportunity to participate in consumerism at reasonable cost. The latest technology was featured, such as cinemas and exhibits of inventions such as X-ray machines (that could be used to fit shoes) and the gramophone.

After 1870, more women began working in stores, creating new and prestigious job opportunities for young women. Despite the low pay and long hours, they enjoyed their experience interacting with fashionable merchandise, and wealthy customers.

=== The Paris Universal Expositions (1855–1900) ===
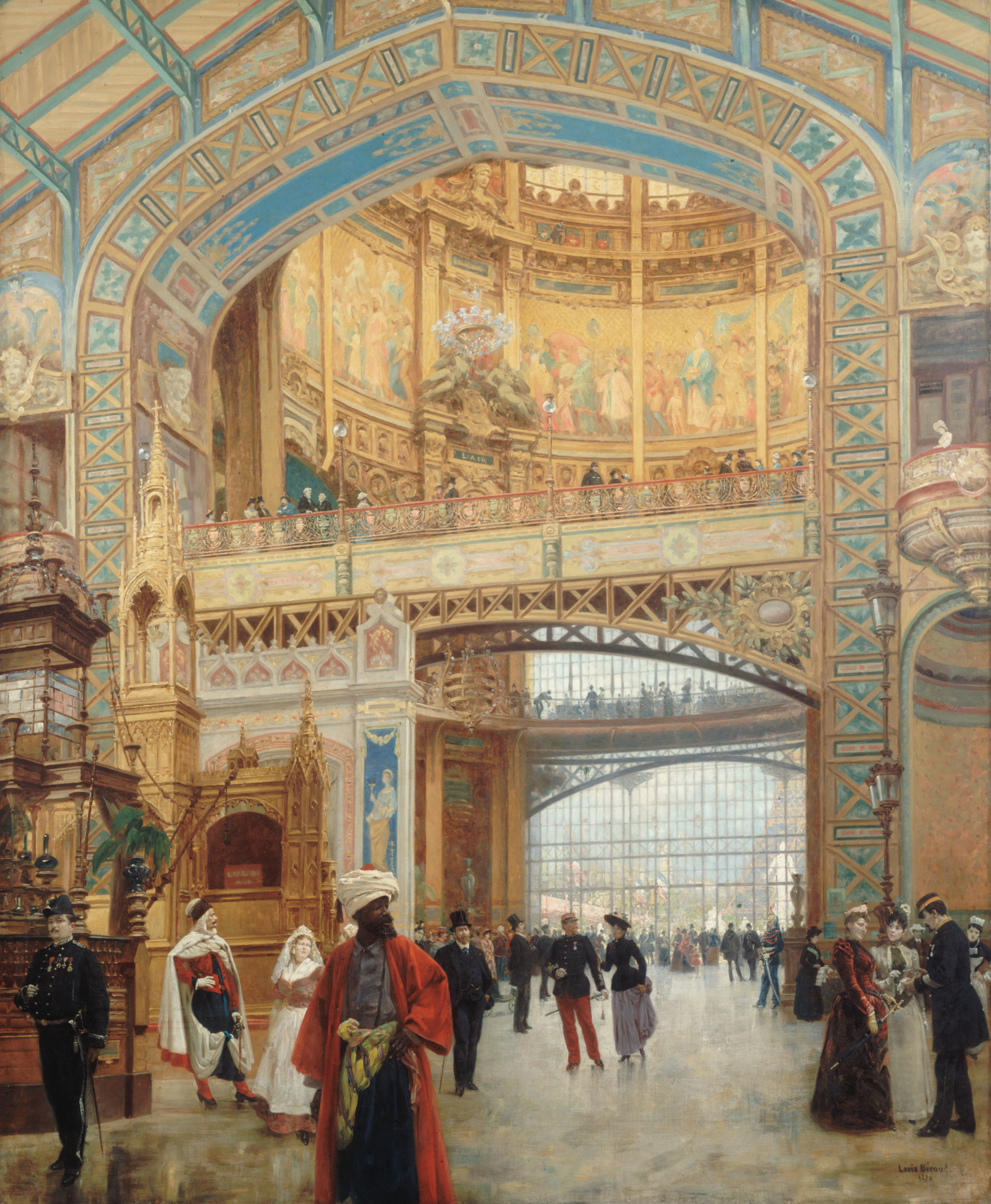
Inside the Gallery of Machines at the Universal Exposition of 1889

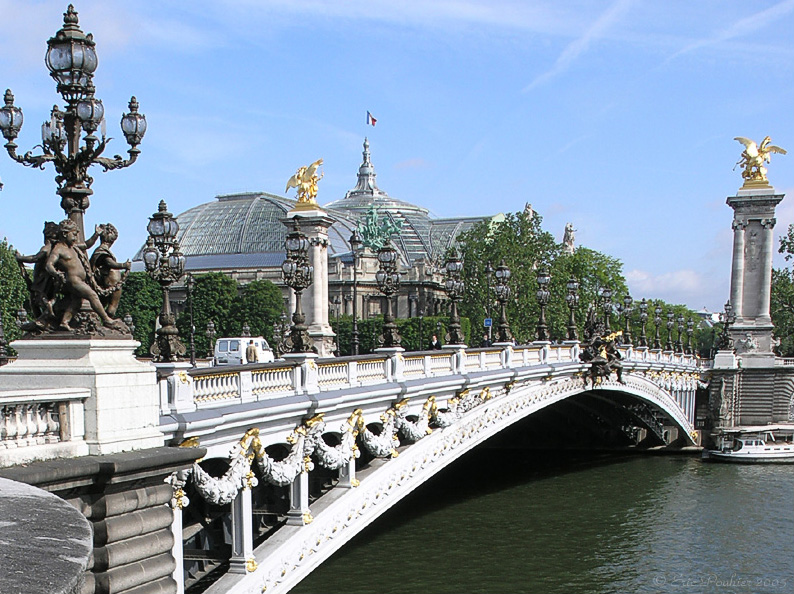
The Pont Alexandre III with the Grand Palais in the background. The latter was built for the Universal Exposition of 1900.

In the second half of the 19th century, Paris hosted five international expositions that attracted millions of visitors and made Paris an increasingly important center of technology, trade, and tourism. The Expositions celebrated the cult of technology and industrial production, both through the impressive iron architecture in which the exhibits were displayed and the almost demonic energy of machines and installations in place.

The first was the Universal Exposition of 1855, hosted by Napoleon III, held in the gardens next to the Champs Élysées. It was inspired by the London's Great Exhibition in 1851 and was designed to showcase the achievements of French industry and culture. The classification system of Bordeaux wines was developed especially for the Exposition. The Théâtre du Rond-Point next to the Champs Élysées is a vestige of that exposition.

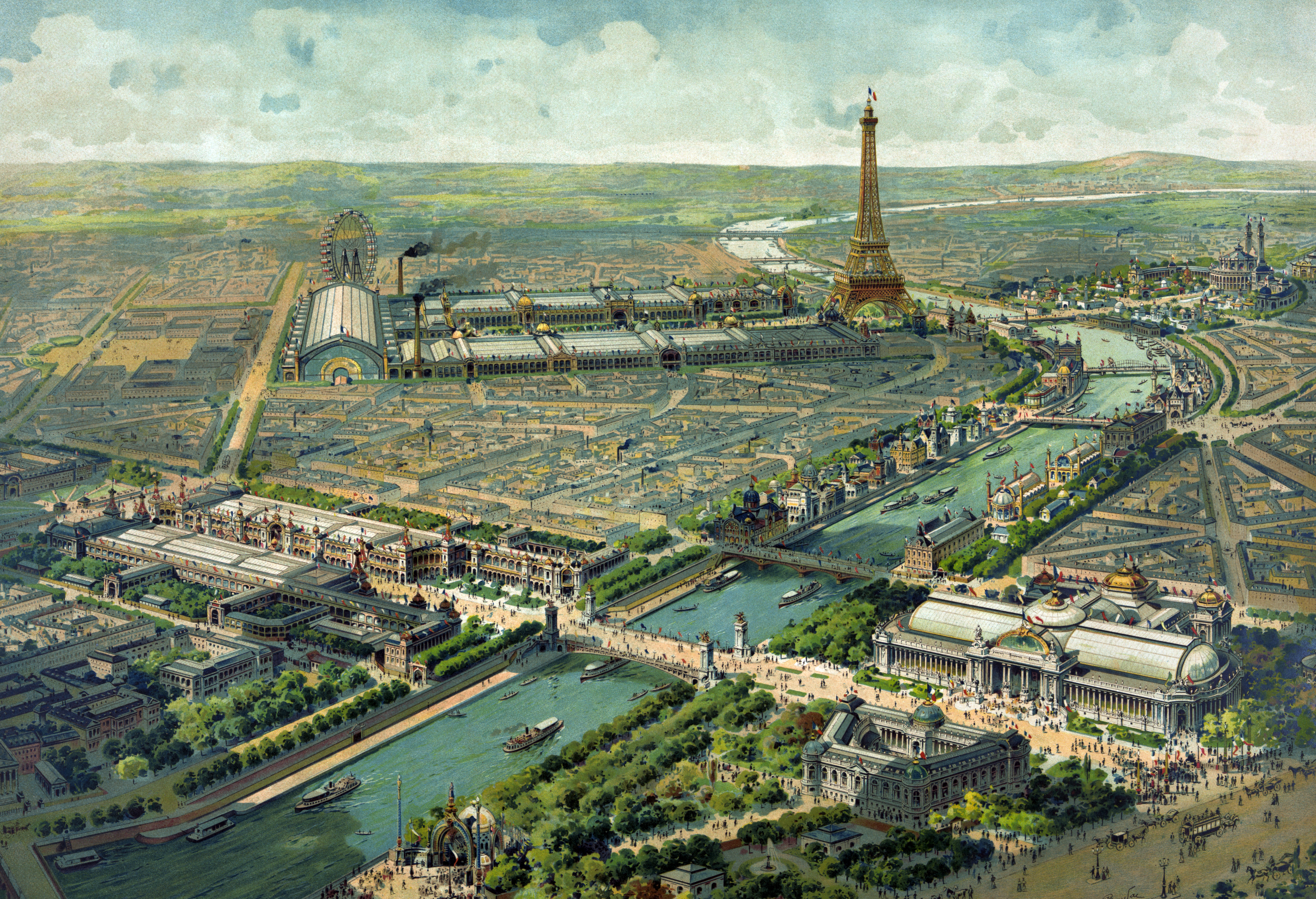
The Universal Exposition of 1900

The Paris International Exposition in 1867, also hosted by Napoleon III, was held in an enormous oval exhibit hall 490 metres long and 380 metres wide in the Champ de Mars. Famous visitors included Czar Alexander II of Russia, Otto Von Bismarck, Kaiser William I of Germany, King Louis II of Bavaria and the Sultan of the Ottoman Empire, the first foreign trip ever made by an Ottoman ruler. The Bateaux Mouches excursion riverboats made their first journeys on the Seine during the 1867 Exposition.

== The Universal Expositions of 1878-1900 ==
The Universal Exposition of 1878 took place on both sides of opthe Seine, in the Champ de Mars and the heights of Trocadéro, where the first Palais de Trocadéro was built. Alexander Graham Bell displayed his new telephone, Thomas Edison presented his phonograph, and the head of the newly finished Statue of Liberty was displayed before it was sent to New York to be attached to the body. In honor of the Exposition, the Avenue de l’Opéra and Place de l’Opéra were lit with electric lights for the first time. The Exposition attracted thirteen million visitors.

The Universal Exposition of 1889, which also took place on the Champ de Mars, celebrated the centenary of the beginning of the French Revolution. The most memorable feature was the Eiffel Tower, 300 meters tall when it opened (now 324 with the addition of broadcast antennas), which served as the gateway to the Expositio18n. The Eiffel Tower remained the world's tallest structure until 1930. It was not popular with everyone: its modern style was denounced in public letters by many of France's most prominent cultural figures, including Guy de Maupassant, Charles Gounod and Charles Garnier. Other popular exhibits included the first musical fountain, lit with colored electric lights, changing in time to music. Buffalo Bill and sharpshooter Annie Oakley drew large crowds to their Wild West Show at the Exposition.

The Universal Exposition of 1900 celebrated the turn of the century. It also took place at the Champ de Mars and attracted fifty million visitors. In addition to the Eiffel Tower, the Exposition featured the world's largest ferris wheel, the Grande Roue de Paris, one hundred metres high, carrying 1,600 passengers in 40 cars. Inside the exhibit hall, Rudolph Diesel demonstrated his new engine, and the first escalator was on display. The Exposition coincided with the 1900 Paris Olympics, the first time that the Olympic games were held outside of Greece. It also popularised a new artistic style, Art Nouveau, to the world. Two architectural legacies of the Exposition, the Grand Palais and Petit Palais, are still in place.

== The First World War (1914–1918) ==
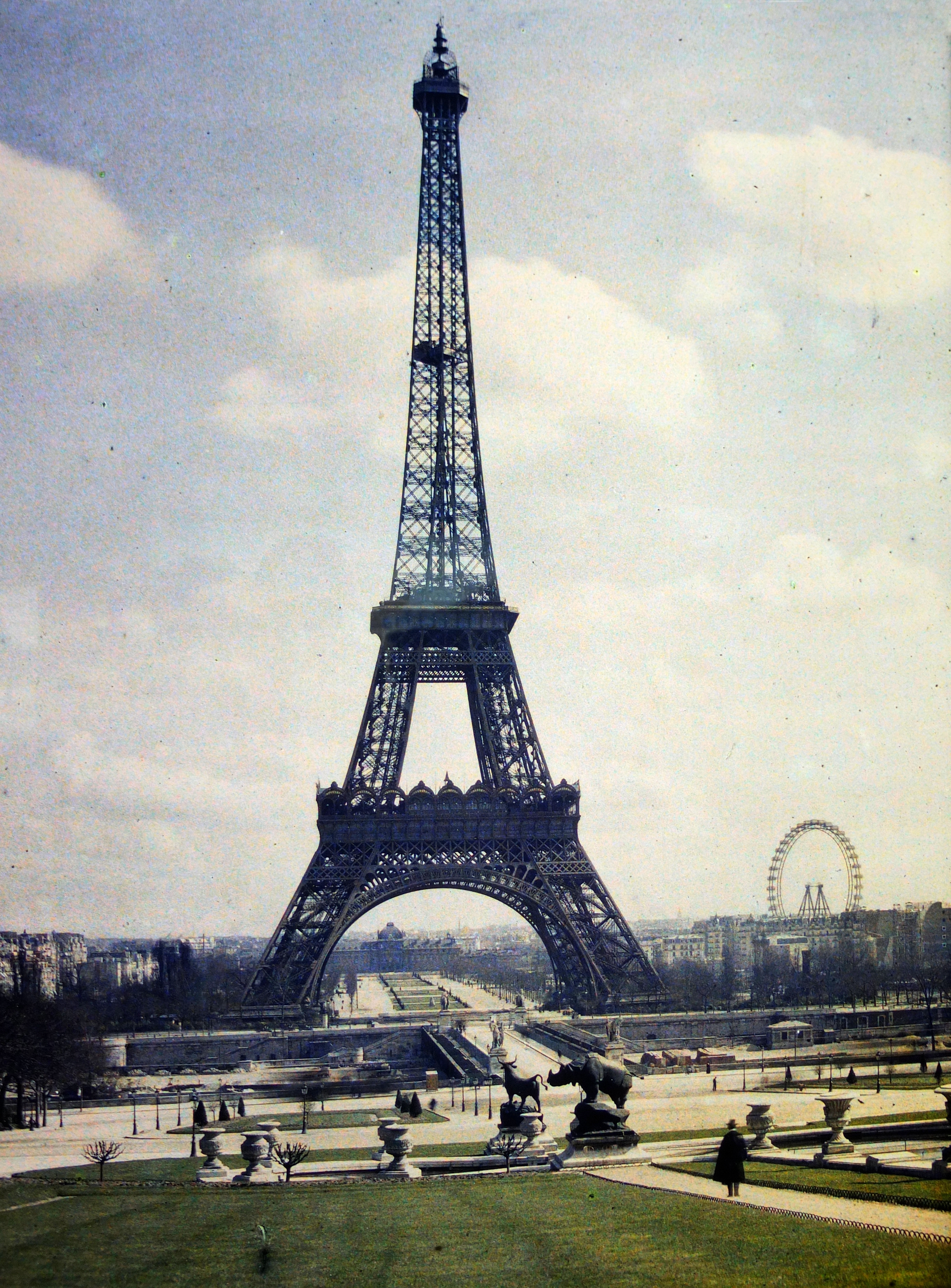
Eiffel Tower in Paris photographed in 1914 using the Autochrome Lumière process.

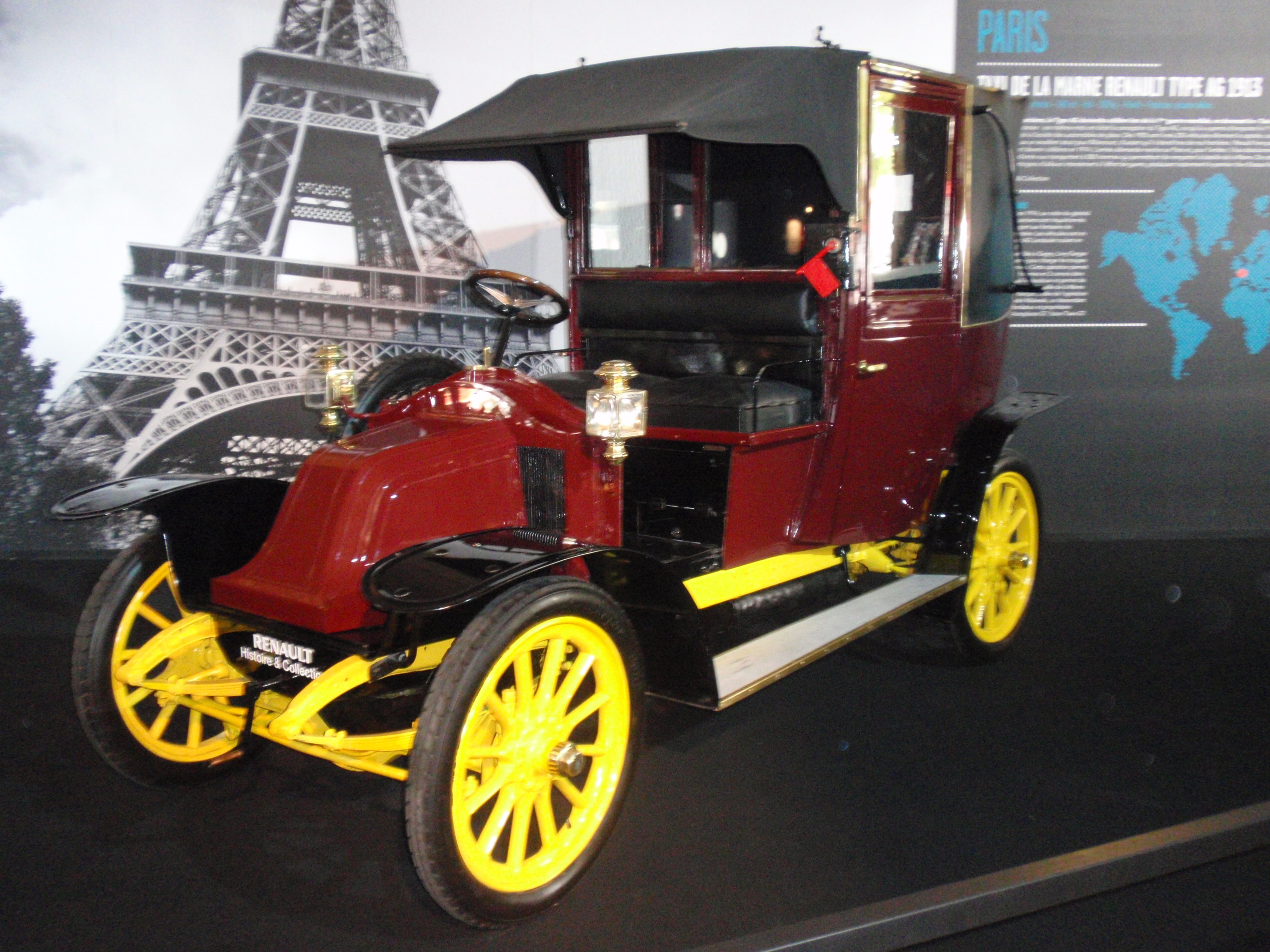
Paris Renault taxis carried 6000 soldiers to the front lines during the First Battle of the Marne (1914).

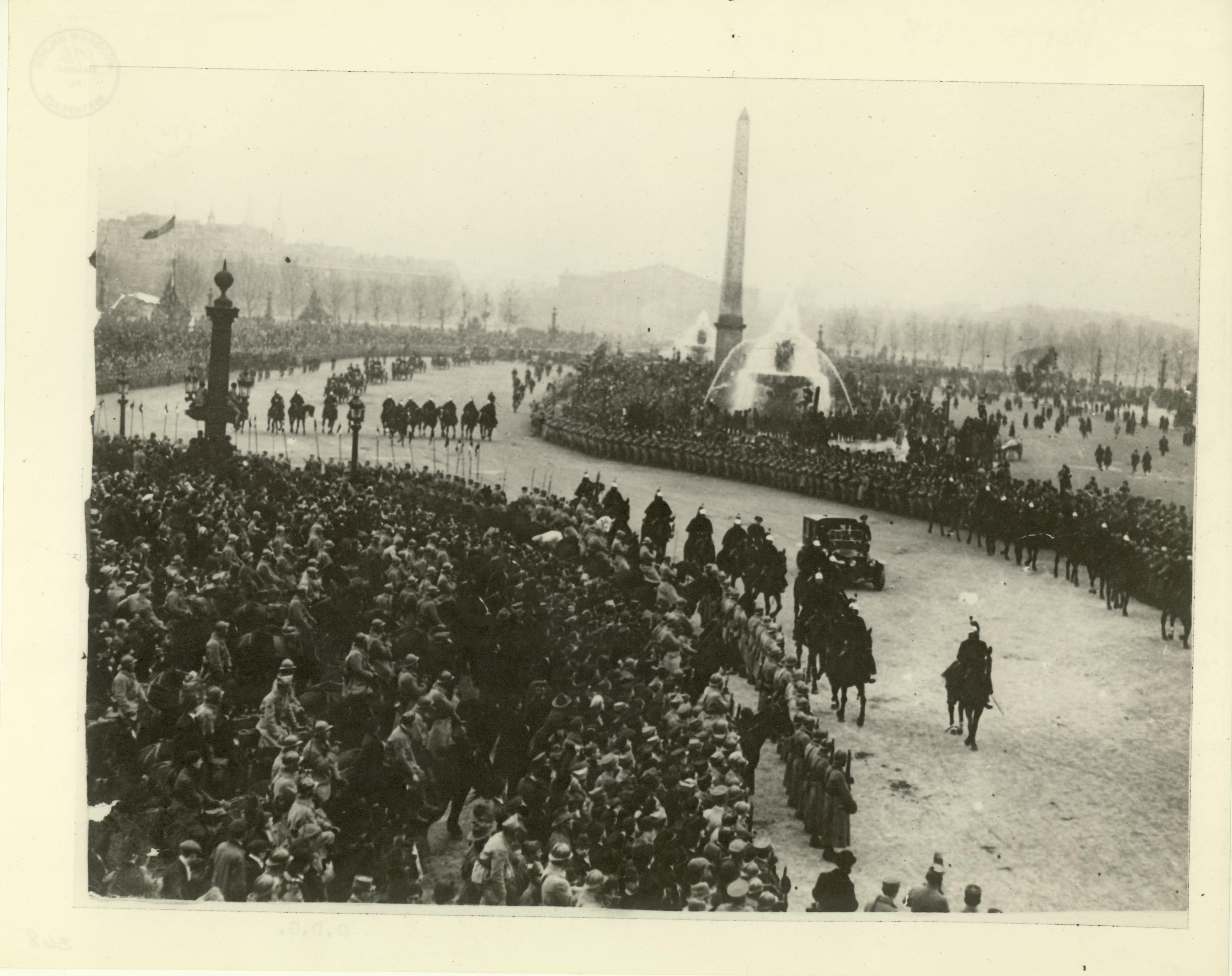
Parisians welcome President Woodrow Wilson on the Place de la Concorde (December 16, 1918).

The outbreak of the First World War in August 1914 saw patriotic demonstrations on the Place de la Concorde and at the Gare de l'Est and Gare du Nord as the mobilized soldiers departed for the front. Within a few weeks, however, the German Army had reached the Marne River, east of Paris. The French government moved to Bordeaux on 2 September, and the great masterpieces of the Louvre were transported to Toulouse.

Early in the First Battle of the Marne, on 5 September 1914 the French army desperately needed reinforcements. General Gallieni, the military governor of Paris, lacked trains. He requisitioned buses and, most famously, about 600 Paris taxicabs that were used to carry six thousand troops to the front at Nanteuil-le-Haudouin, fifty kilometers away. Each taxi carried five soldiers following the lights of the taxi ahead, and the mission was accomplished within twenty-four hours. The German troops were surprised and were pushed back by the French and British armies. The number of soldiers transported was small, but the effect on French morale was enormous; it confirmed the solidarity between the people and the army. The government returned to Paris, and theatres and cafés re-opened.

The city was bombed by German heavy Gotha bombers and by a Zeppelin.

The Parisians suffered epidemics of typhoid and measles; a deadly outbreak of Spanish influenza during the winter of 1918-19 killed thousands of Parisians.

In the spring of 1918, the Imperial German Army launched a new offensive and threatened Paris once more, bombing it with the Paris Gun. On 29 March 1918, one shell struck the Church of Saint-Gervais and killed 88 persons. Sirens were installed to warn the population of impending bombardments. On 29 June 1917, soldiers of the American Expeditionary Forces arrived in France to reinforce the French and British armies. The German Army was pushed back once again, and the German Empire signed the Armistice of 11 November 1918. Hundreds of thousands of Parisians filled the Champs-Élysées on 17 November to celebrate the return of Alsace and Lorraine to France. Equally huge crowds welcomed President Woodrow Wilson to the Hôtel de Ville on 16 December. Huge crowds of Parisians also lined the Champs Élysées on 14 July 1919 for a victory parade by the Allied armies.

=== Civilian life ===
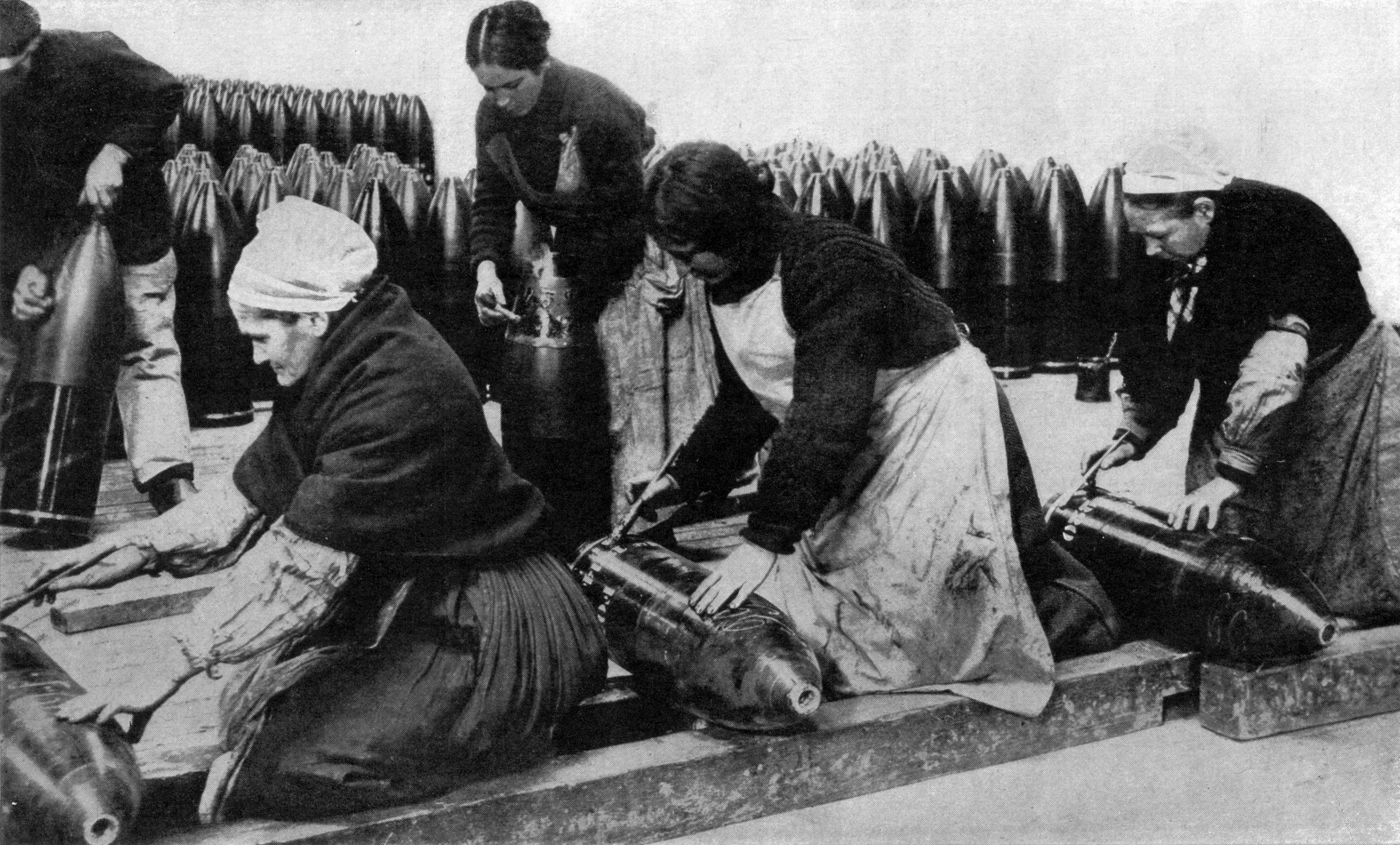
Women workers, known as munitionnettes, making artillery shells (1917)

Life in Paris was difficult during the war: gas, electricity, coal, bread, butter, flour, potatoes and sugar were strictly rationed. Consumer co-operatives sprang up and municipalities developed communal gardening spaces. Coal was critically short in the unusually cold winter of 1916-17. The outer neighborhoods of the city, particularly the 13th, 14th, 15th and 18th arrondissements, became centers of the defense industry, producing trucks, cannons, ambulances, and munitions. A large Renault factory at Boulogne-Billancourt produced tanks, while a new factory in Javel mass-produced artillery shells; when the war ended, it became the first Citroën factory. The site is now Parc André Citroën. As factory workers were drafted and sent to the front, their places were taken by women as well as 183,000 colonials from Africa and Indo-China who were closely watched by the government. All classes supported the war effort in a burst of consensus known as the Union sacrée. Antiwar voices existed, but did not represent a strong base. While the government stressed efficiency and maximizing supplies for the army, the working class was largely committed to a traditional sense of consumer rights, whereby it was the duty of the government to provide the basic food, housing and fuel for the city. Hoarding and profiteering were evils that citizens should organize to combat. In 1917, women workers in clothing factories, department stores, banks, munition factories and other enterprises went on strike, winning a wage increase and a five-day week.

== Between the Wars (1919–1939) ==
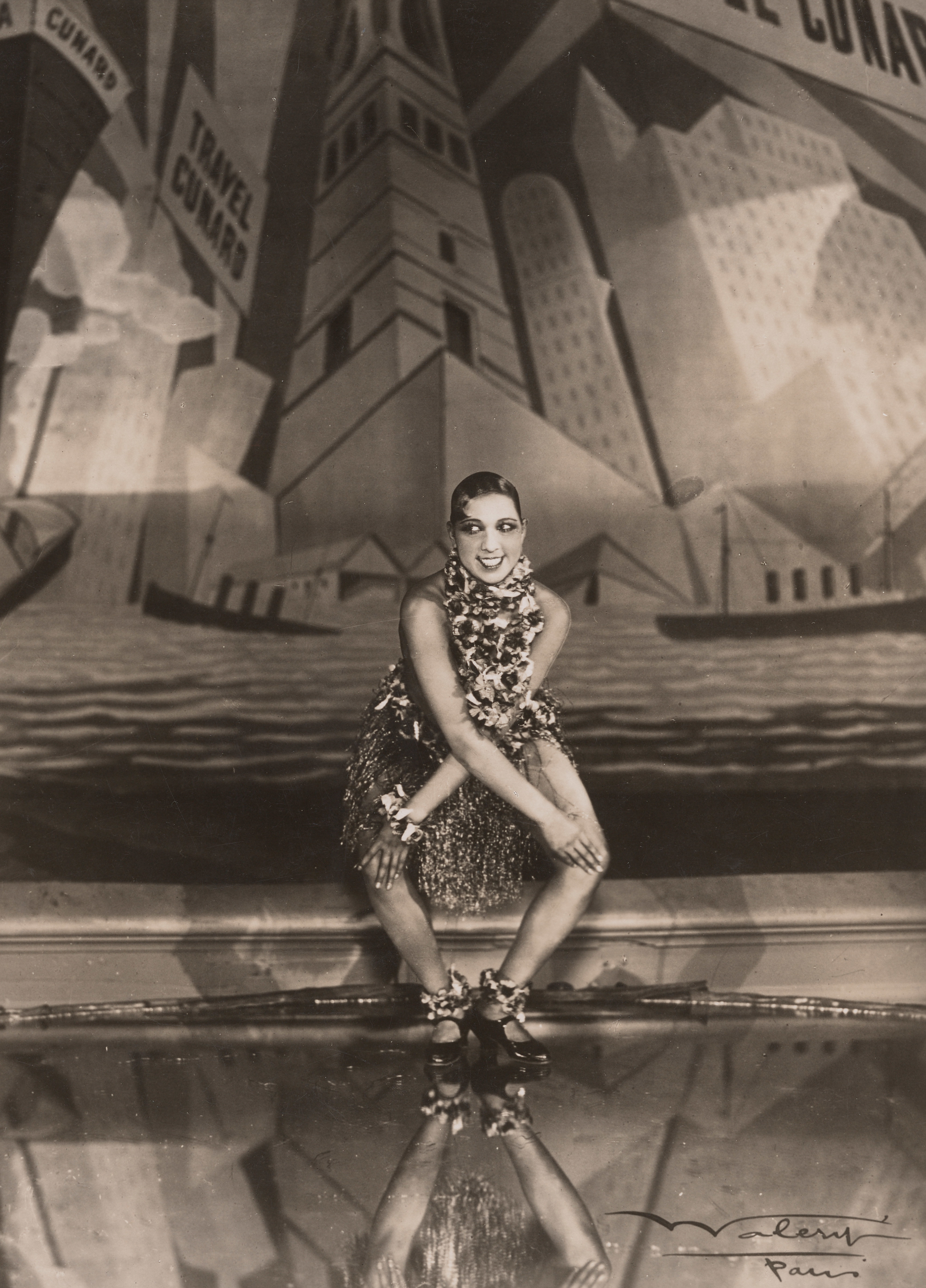
Josephine Baker dances the Charleston at the Folies Bergère (1926).

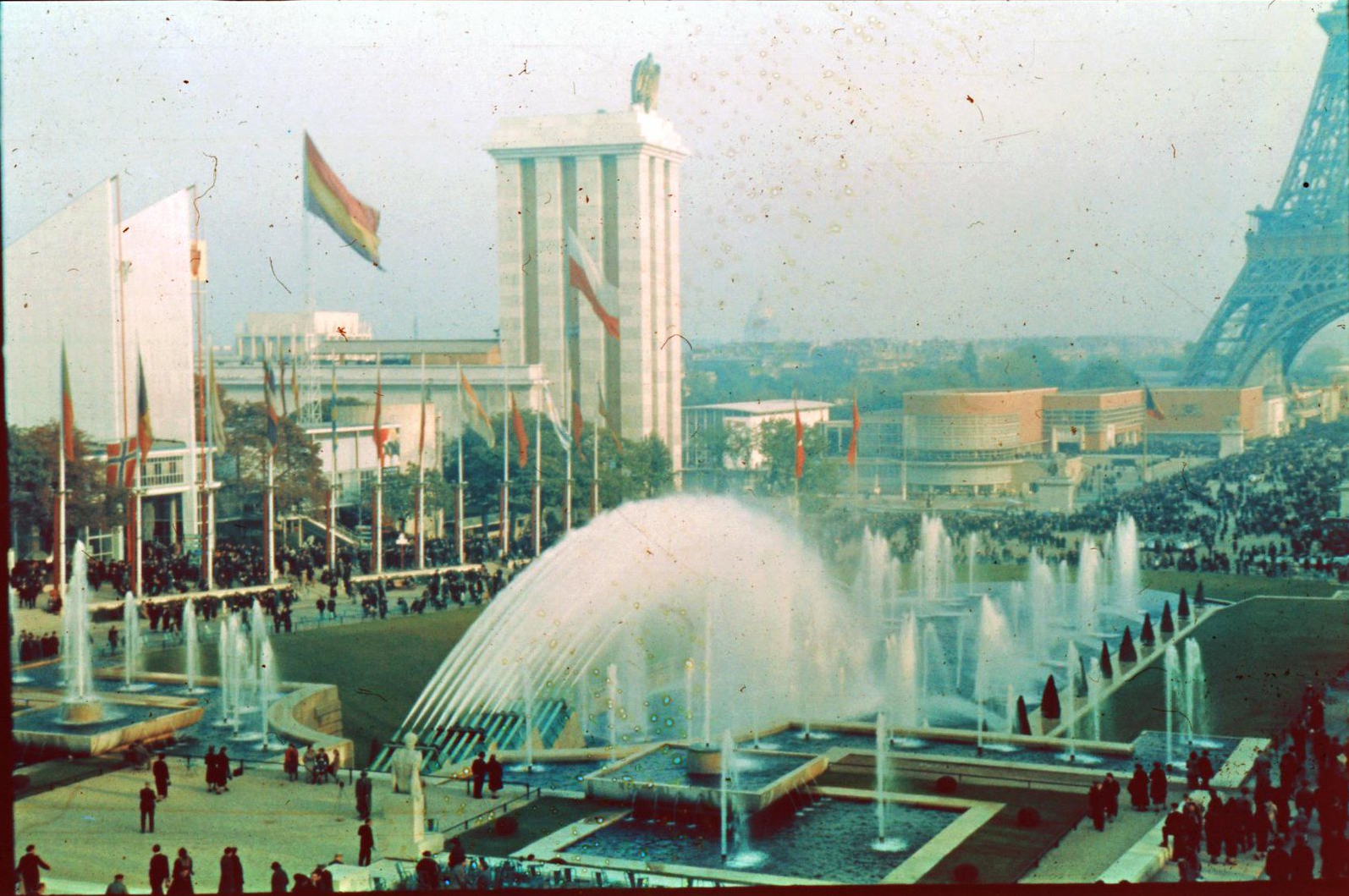
The Exposition Internationale des Arts et Techniques dans la Vie Moderne in Paris photographed in 1937 using the Agfacolor process.

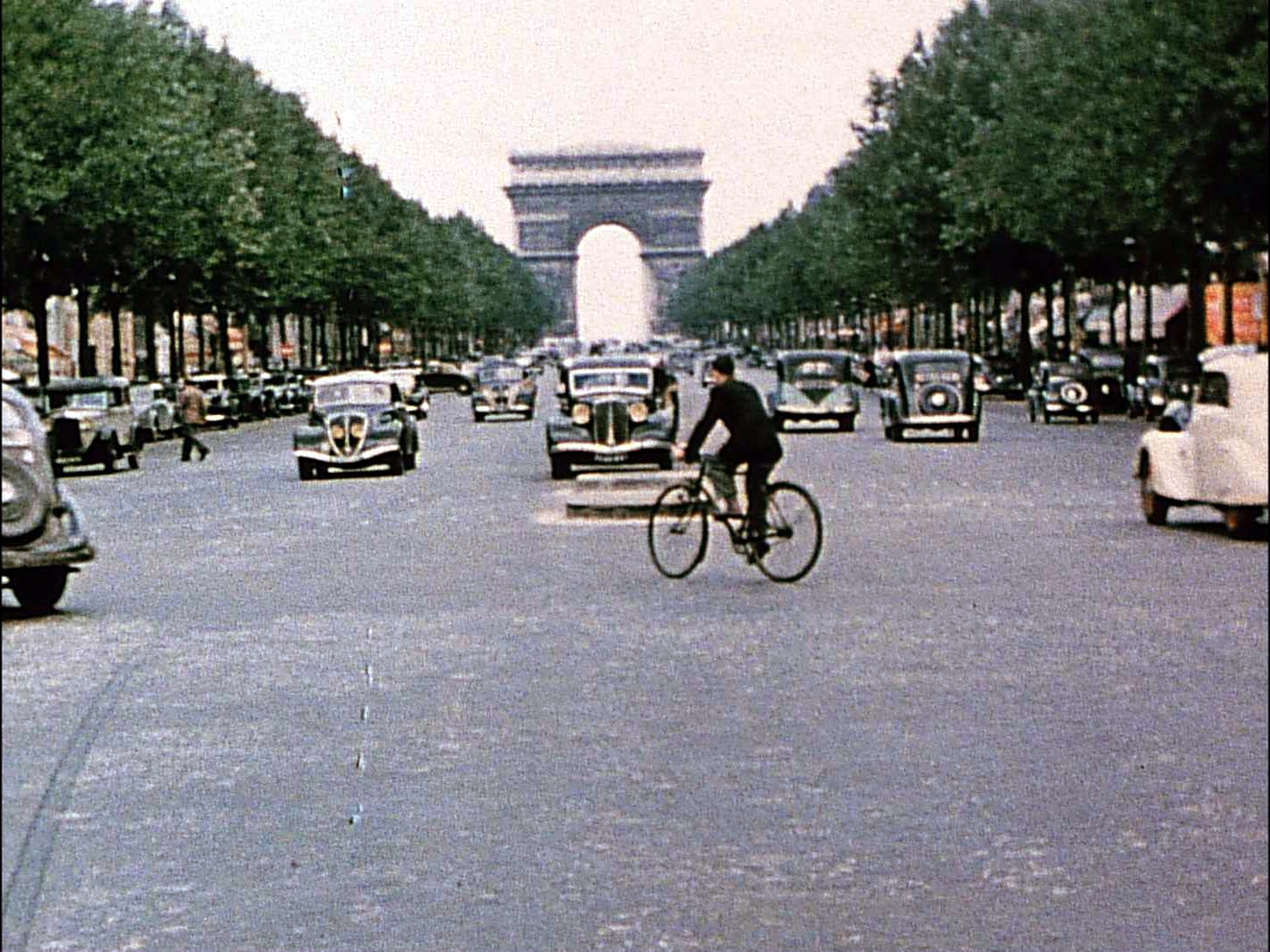
Arc de Triomphe (1939)

After the war, unemployment surged, prices soared, and rationing continued; Parisian households were limited to 300 grams of bread per day and meat only four days a week. A general strike paralysed the city on 21 July 1919. The French Communist and Socialist parties competed for influence with the workers. The future leader of Vietnam, Ho Chi Minh, worked in Paris from 1919 to 1923, studying nationalism and socialism. Leopold Senghor, the future first president of Senegal, arrived in 1928 to study and became a university professor and eventually a member of the Académie Française. The old fortifications surrounding the city were useless and torn down in the 1920s. They were replaced by tens of thousands of low-cost seven-story public housing units that were filled by low-income blue-collar workers who mostly voted socialist or communist. In the 1960s, they would be replaced by refugees from Algeria. The result was a bourgeois central city surrounded by a radicalized ring. In the central city, meanwhile, a number of new museums were built, especially in connection with the 1931 Colonial Exposition. That Exposition proved a disappointment in comparison with the city's previous successful international projects.

=== Arts ===
Despite the hardships, Paris resumed its place as the capital of the arts during what became known as les années folles, or "the crazy years." The city hosted world's fair in 1925 including such artists like Le Corbusier. The centre of artistic ferment moved from Montmartre to the neighbourhood of Montparnasse around the intersection of the Boulevard Raspail to the cafés Le Jockey, Le Dôme, La Rontonde, and, after 1927, La Coupole. Painters, writers and poets, including Ernest Hemingway, Igor Stravinsky, W. B. Yeats, James Joyce, and Ezra Pound came from around the world to take part in the "fête". Paris was the birthplace of new artistics movements such as Dadaism and Surrealism. George Gershwin came to Paris in 1928 and stayed at the Majestic Hotel, where he composed An American in Paris, capturing the sound of the horns of the Paris taxis as they circled the Place de l'Étoile. Jazz allowed black communities to present their culture as innovative and civilized, but also opened associations among jazz, primitivism, and sexually suggestive performances. The American singer Josephine Baker and the Revue Nègre encapsulated these issues in sensational performances at the Théâtre des Champs-Élysées. A circle of Parisian men and women of colour presented their own Caribbean beguine style in distinction to jazz and promoted it as a source of pride and racial identification. They demonstrated an early instance of Negritude values intermingled with race-uplift concerns. The city also hosted the Summer Olympics in 1924.

=== Paris in the Great Depression ===
The worldwide Great Depression hit home in 1931 and brought with it hardships and a more somber mood in Paris. The population declined slightly from its all-time peak of 2.9 million in 1921 to 2.8 million in 1936. The arrondissements in the centre lost as much as twenty percent of their population, while the outer neighborhoods gained ten percent. The low birth rate of Parisians was compensated by a new wave of immigration from Russia, Poland, Germany, eastern and central Europe, Italy, Portugal and Spain. Political tensions mounted in Paris with strikes, demonstrations and confrontations between the Communists and the Popular Front on the extreme left and the Action Française on the extreme right.

Despite the tensions, the city hosted yet another world's fair in 1937, in this case with the very long title Exposition Internationale des Arts et Techniques dans la Vie Moderne (International Exposition Dedicated to Art and Technology in Modern Life). It was held on both sides of the Seine at the Champ de Mars and the Colline de Chaillot. The Palais de Chaillot, the terraces of which were ornamented with gigantic water cannon fountains, was the main venue, along with the Palais de Tokyo, which now hosts the Musée d'Art Moderne de la Ville de Paris ("Paris Museum of Modern Art") in its eastern wing. The pavilions of the Soviet Union, crowned by a hammer and sickle, and of Germany, with an eagle and swastika on its summit, faced each other in the center of the exhibition. Instead of a spirit of Paris proclaiming international harmony, the juxtaposition of these two foreign pavilions, trying to outdo each other in political grandiloquence, was a reminder that by the late 1930s, besides its other problems, the city was overshadowed by threatening international rivalries.

== Occupied Paris and the Liberation (1940–1945) ==
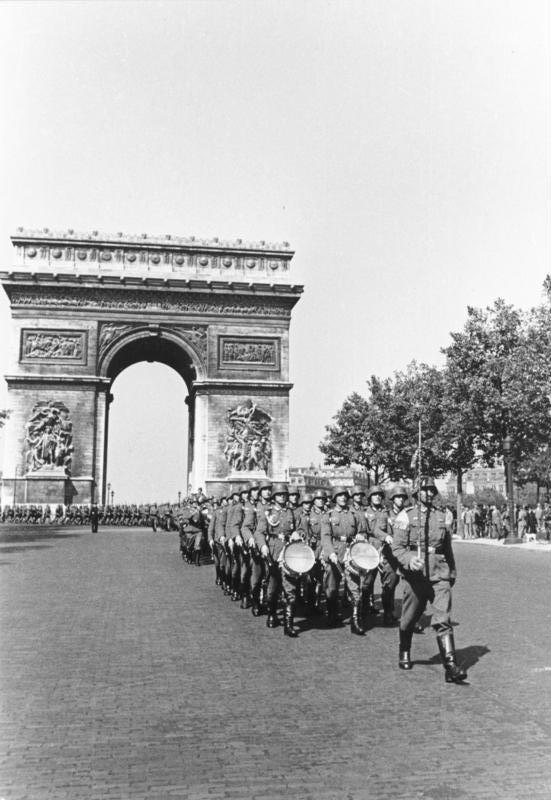
German soldiers parade on the Champs Élysées in June 1940.

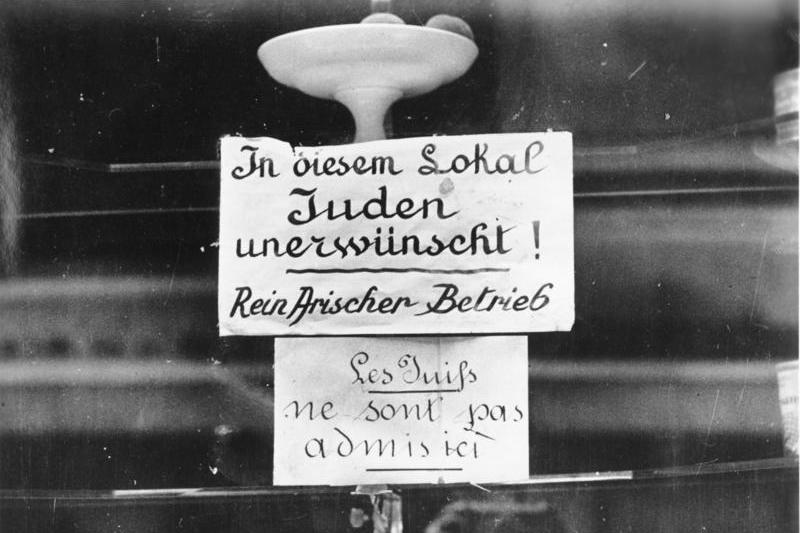
A German sign outside a Paris restaurant announcing that Jews would not be admitted

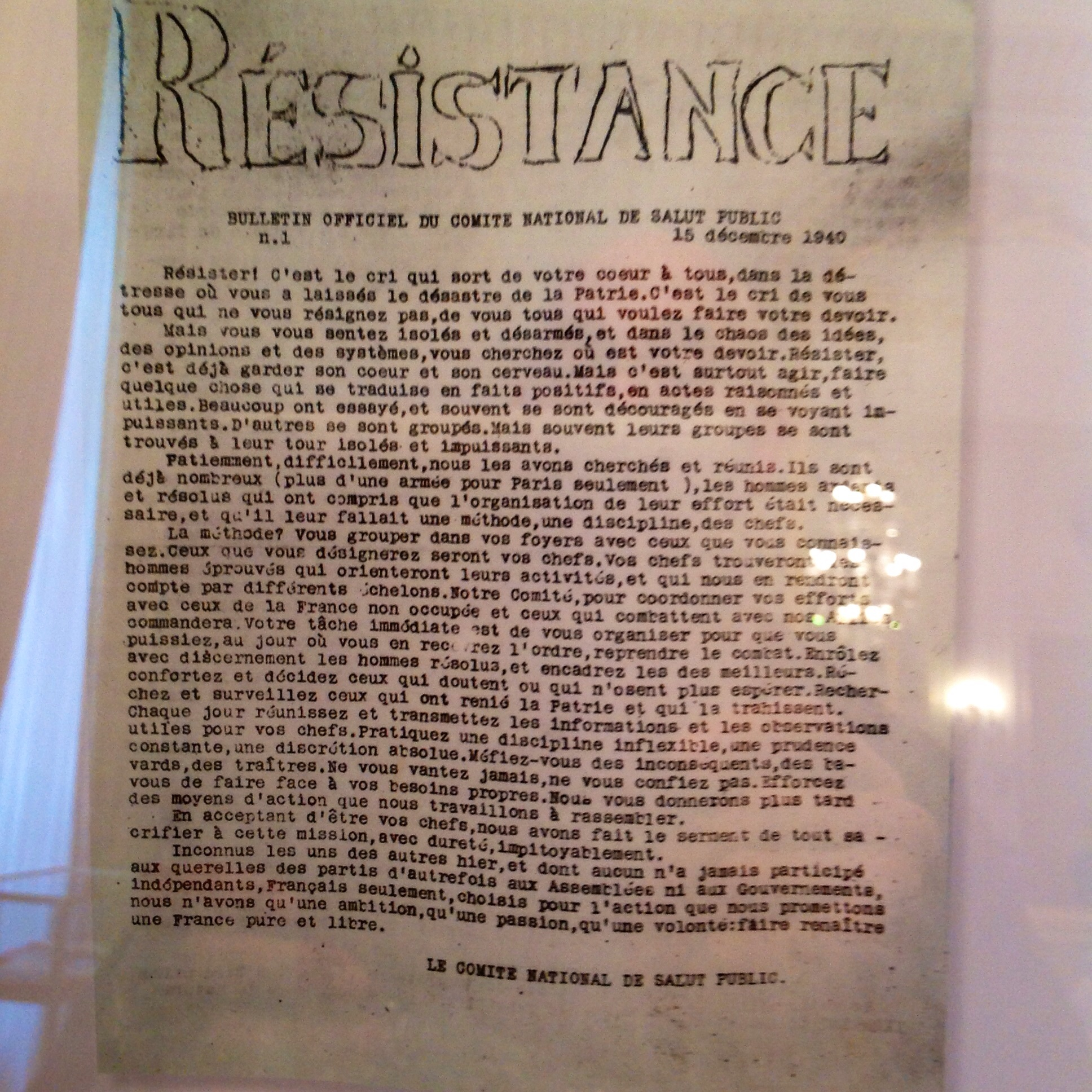
An issue of the first underground paper, Résistance, of 15 December 1940

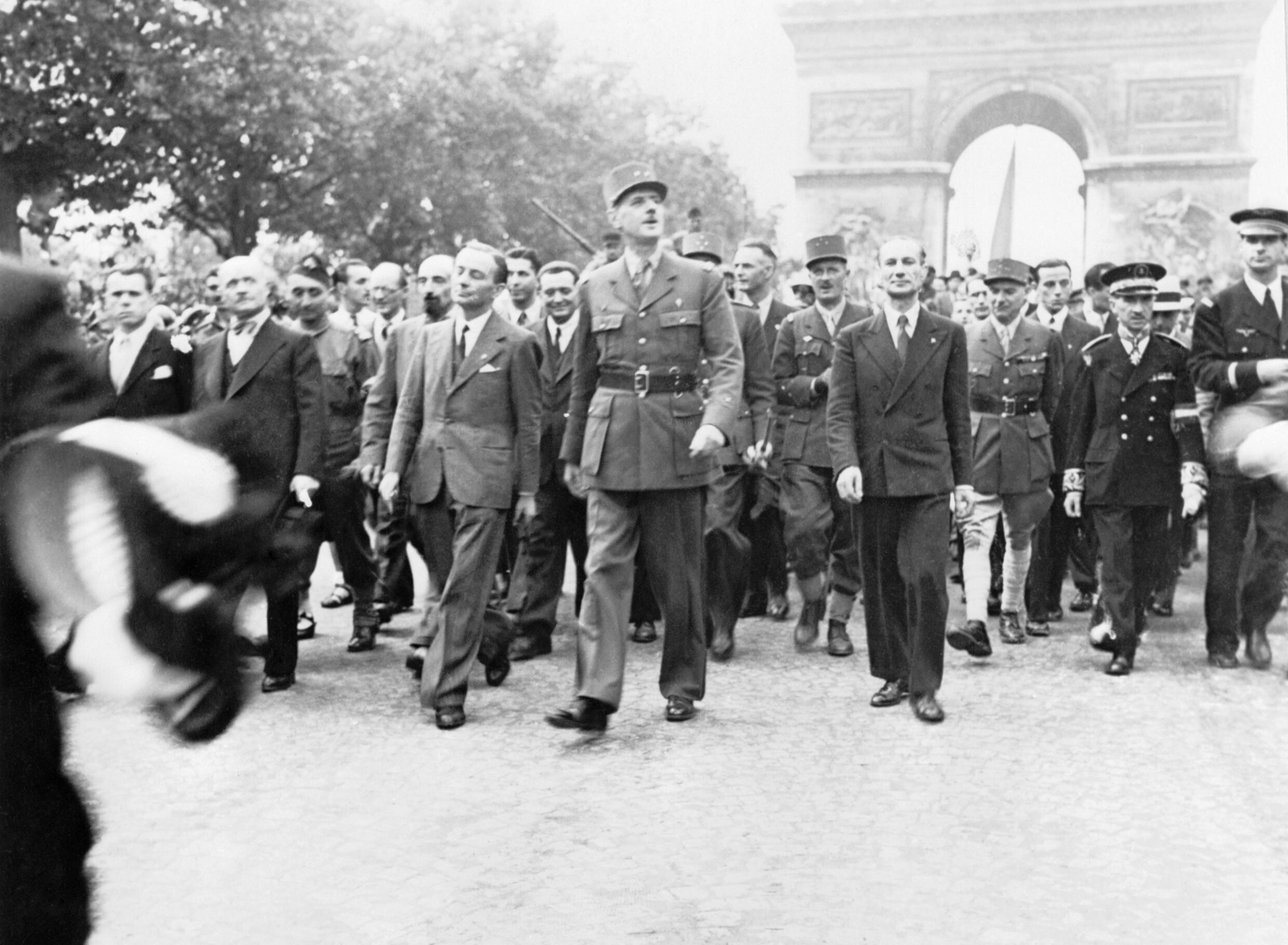
On 26 August 1944, General Charles de Gaulle leads a parade to celebrate the liberation of Paris the previous day.

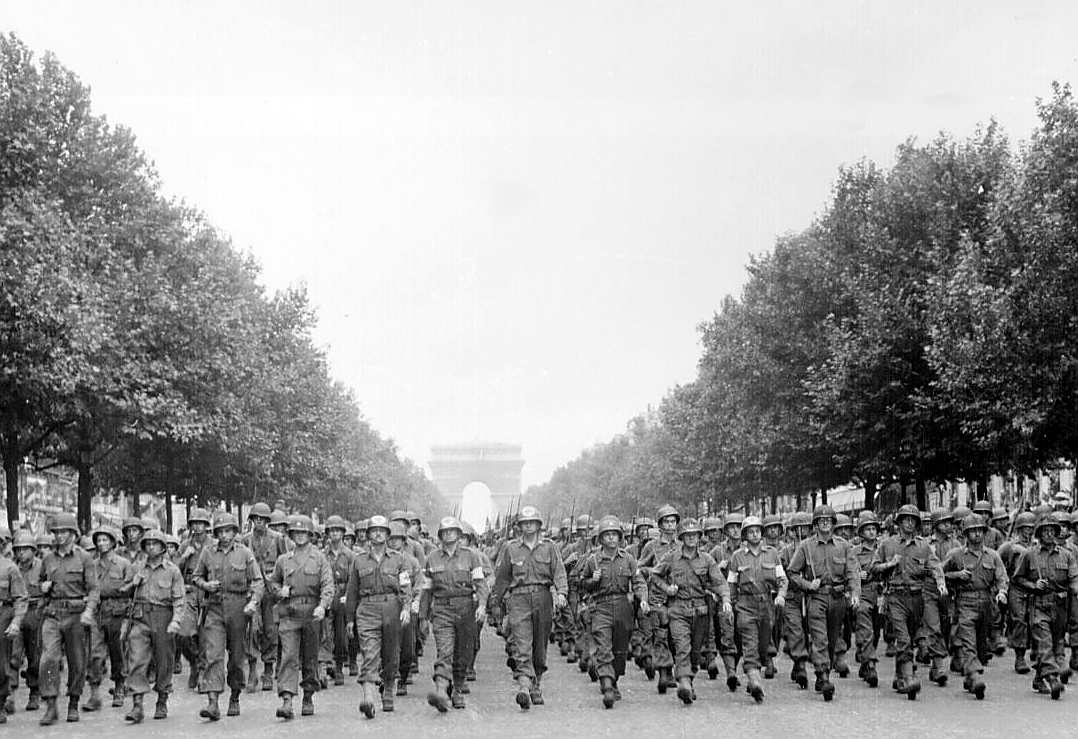
The American 28th Infantry Division on the Champs Élysées in the "Victory Day" parade on 29 August 1944

Following the German invasion of Poland in September 1939, France declared war on Germany. The French defense plan was purely passive; the French army simply waited for the Germans to attack. On 31 August, the French government began to evacuate 30,000 children from Paris to the provinces, the population was issued gas masks, and bomb shelters were constructed in the city squares. The major works of art of the Louvre and other museums were also evacuated to the Loire Valley and other locations, and the architectural landmarks were protected by sandbags. The French Army waited in the fortifications of the Maginot Line, while in Paris the cafés and theatres remained open.

The Germans attacked France on 10 May 1940. They bypassed the Maginot Line and advanced all the way to the English Channel before heading toward Paris. Paris was flooded with refugees from the battle zone. The Citroën factory was bombed on 2 June. On 10 June, the French government fled Paris, first to Tours and then to Bordeaux. On 12 June, Paris was declared an open city. The first German soldiers entered the French capital on June 14 and paraded down the Champs Élysées from the Arc de Triomphe. The city's conqueror, Adolf Hitler, arrived on June 24, visited various tourist sites and paid homage at Napoleon's tomb.

During the Occupation, the French Government moved to Vichy, and the flag of Nazi Germany flew over all the French government buildings. Signs in German were placed on the main boulevards, and the clocks of Paris were reset to Berlin time. The German military high command in France (the Militärbefehlshabers Frankreich) moved into the Majestic Hotel at 19 Avenue Kléber; the Abwehr (the German military intelligence), took over the Hôtel Lutetia; the Luftwaffe (the German air force) occupied the Hôtel Ritz; the German Navy, the Hôtel de la Marine on the Place de la Concorde; the Gestapo occupied the building at 93 Rue Lauriston; and the German commandant of Paris and his staff moved into the Hôtel Meurice on the Rue de Rivoli. Certain movie theatres and cafés were set aside for German soldiers, while the German officers enjoyed the Ritz, Maxim's, La Coupole and the other exclusive restaurants; the exchange rate was fixed to favor the German occupiers.

For the Parisians, the occupation was a series of frustrations, shortages and humiliations. A curfew was in effect from nine in the evening until five in the morning; at night, the city went dark. Rationing of food, tobacco, coal and clothing was imposed from September 1940. Every year, the supplies grew scantier and the prices higher. A million Parisians left the city for the provinces, where there was more food and fewer Germans. French press and radio contained only German propaganda.

Jews were forced to wear the yellow Star of David badge and were barred from certain professions and public places. On 16–17 July 1942, 12,884 Jews, including 4,051 children and 5,082 women, were rounded up by the French police on orders of the Germans. Unmarried persons and couples without children were taken to Drancy, north of Paris, while seven thousand members of families went to the Vélodrome d’Hiver ("Vel' d'Hiv'"), on Rue Nélaton in the 15th arrondissement, where they were crowded together in the stadium for five days before being sent to the Auschwitz concentration camp, where many of them were murdered.

The first demonstration against the Occupation took place by Paris students on 11 November 1940. As the war continued, clandestine groups and networks were created, some loyal to the Communist Party, others to General de Gaulle in London. They wrote slogans on walls, organized an underground press, and sometimes attacked German officers and soldiers. Reprisals by the Germans were swift and harsh.

Paris was not bombed as often or as heavily as London or Berlin, but the factories and railway yards in the outer parts of the city and suburbs were frequent targets. A night raid on the La Chapelle railway station in the 18th arrondissement on 20–21 April 1944 killed between 640 and 670 persons and destroyed hundreds of buildings.

The Allies landed at Normandy on 6 June 1944 and two months later broke the German lines to advance toward Paris. As the Allies advanced, strikes organised by the Resistance disrupted the railways, police and other public services in the city. On August 19, the resistance networks gave the orders for a general uprising in the city. Its forces seized the prefecture of police and other public buildings in the heart of the city. General Leclerc's French 2nd Armored Division and the American 4th Infantry Division entered the city on August 25 and converged in the centre, where they were met by delirious crowds. The German commander of Paris, Dietrich von Choltitz, ignored an order from Adolf Hitler to destroy the monuments of the city and surrendered it on 25 August. General de Gaulle arrived on 26 August and led a massive parade down the Champs Élysées, all the way to Notre-Dame for a Te Deum ceremony. On 29 August, the US Army's entire 28th Infantry Division, which had assembled in the Bois de Boulogne the previous night, paraded 24-abreast up the Avenue Hoche to the Arc de Triomphe, then down the Champs Élysées. The division, men and vehicles, marched through Paris "on its way to assigned attack positions northeast of the French capital."

== Post-war (1946–2000) ==
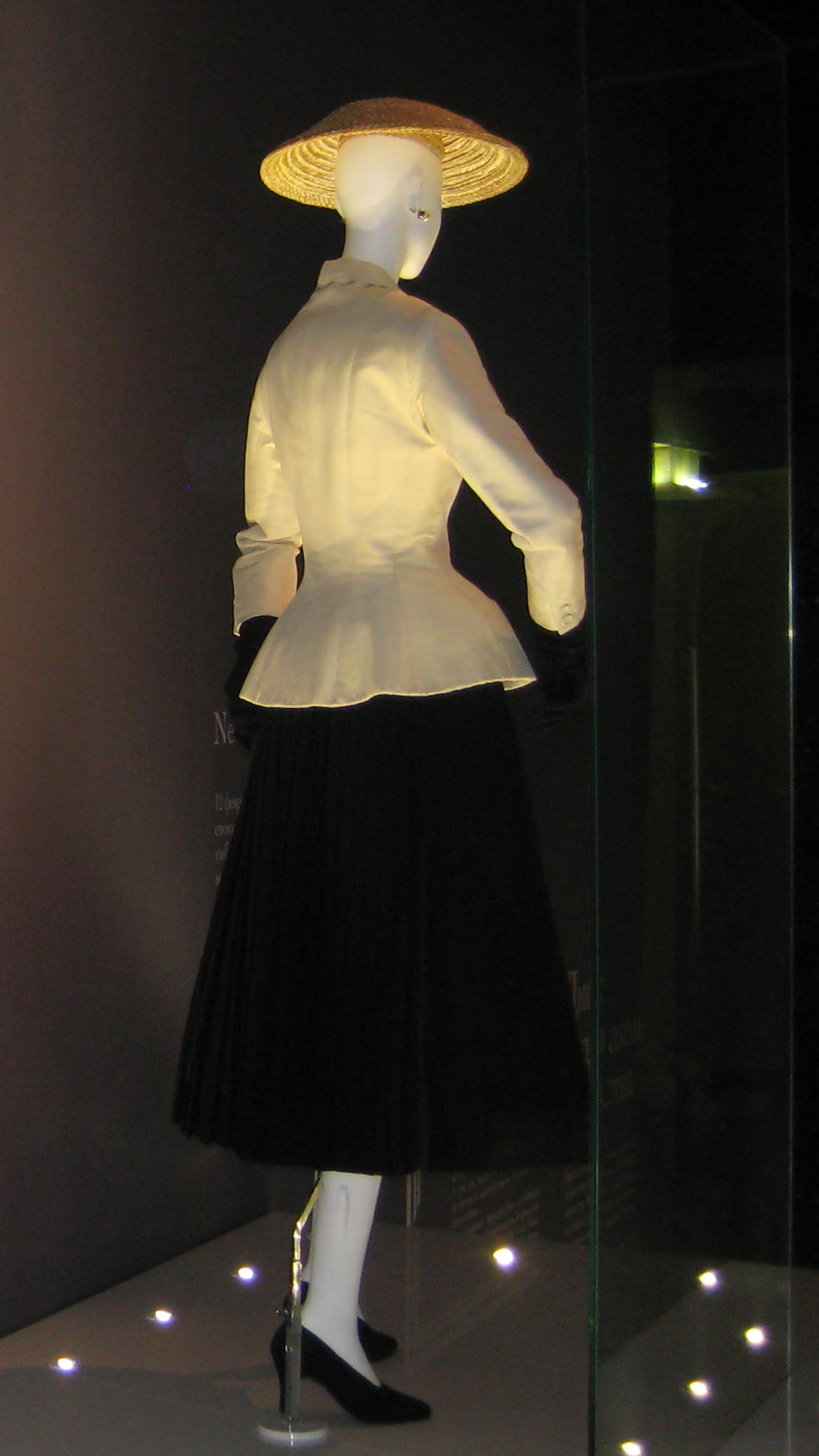
Soon after the War designers such as Christian Dior brought Paris back to the lead of high fashion. This is an example of Dior's New Look (1947).

The Pompidou Centre, the city's major museum of modern art (1977), surprised Parisians by putting all its internal plumbing and infrastructure on the outside.

The wear and tear of decades of neglect were painfully obvious in smoke-blackened stone facades, cracked and untended stucco, and peeling paintwork in post-World War II Paris. However, by the mid-1970s, Paris had been repaired and refurbished on a scale that echoed the age of Haussmann.

The Liberation of Paris and the end of the war did not end the hardships of the Parisians. Rationing of bread continued until February 1948, and coffee, cooking oil, sugar and rice were rationed until May 1949. Housing in Paris was old and run-down. In 1954, thirty-five percent of Paris apartment buildings had been built before 1871. Eighty-one percent of Paris apartments did not have their own bathroom, and fifty-five percent did not have their own toilet, yet housing was expensive and in short supply. In 1950, the government began a new large-scale project to construct apartment blocks for low-income Parisians, called HLMs (habitations à loyers modérés), usually on the edges of the city or in the suburbs.

The population of Paris did not return to its 1936 level until 1946 and grew to 2,850,000 by 1954, including 135,000 immigrants, mostly from Algeria, Morocco, Italy and Spain. The exodus of middle-class Parisians to the suburbs continued. The population of the city declined during the 1960s and 1970s (2,753,000 in 1962, 2.3 million in 1972) before finally stabilizing in the 1980s (2,168.000 in 1982, 2,152,000 in 1992).

With France badly hurt by the war, the question was whether Paris could recover its world stature. By the 1970s, Parisians on all sides feared that the city was "losing its star-quality attractiveness and prestige." They felt that the modernizing operations of the 1960s and 1970s had failed to reverse the declining quality of life, and that the capital had a diminished "lustre" and influence abroad.

The politics of Paris remained turbulent throughout the 1940s and early 1950s. A strike in December 1950 caused the cutoff of electricity and the shutdown of the Paris Métro. Communist-led demonstrators battled the police in the streets in 1948 and 1951. The struggle for the independence of Algeria and the resistance of French residents of Algeria, led to numerous bombings in 1961 and 1962 and deadly violent confrontations in Paris between demonstrators and the police. The deeply divided postwar Fourth Republic collapsed in 1958, and a new Constitution was adopted. A new government, under President Charles de Gaulle, was elected with a Fifth Republic proclaimed. In May 1968, Paris experienced student uprisings on the Left Bank: barricades and red flags appeared in the Latin Quarter on 2 May 1968, university buildings were occupied, and a general strike closed down much of Paris on 13 May. A massive counter-demonstration of one million people on the Champs Élysées in support of President de Gaulle on 30 May 1968 was followed by a gradual return to calm.

The cultural life of Paris resumed, this time centered on the cafés of Saint-Germain-des-Prés: the Café de Flore, the Brasserie Lipp and Les Deux Magots, where the philosopher Jean-Paul Sartre and writer Simone de Beauvoir held court, and the nightclubs La Rose Rouge and Le Tabou. The fashionable musical styles were bebop and jazz, led by Sidney Bechet and trumpet player Boris Vian. The new Museum of Modern Art of Paris opened in June 1947 in the old Palais de Tokyo of the 1937 Universal Exposition. Paris designers, led by Christian Dior, made Paris once again the capital of high fashion.

Paris had not had an elected mayor since the French Revolution. Napoleon Bonaparte and his successors had personally chosen a prefect to run the city. The law was changed on 31 December 1975 under President Valery Giscard d'Estaing. The first mayoral election in 1977 was won by Jacques Chirac, the former prime minister. Chirac served as mayor of Paris for eighteen years, until 1995, when he was elected president of the French Republic. He was succeeded as mayor by another candidate of the right, Jean Tiberi.

=== Paris projects of the French presidents ===
Each President of the Fifth Republic has sought to make their mark on Paris, and each initiated a plan of Grands Travaux ("Great Works"). The first President of the Fifth Republic, Charles de Gaulle, constructed a new central produce market at Rungis to replace the picturesque but aging market of Les Halles. But the most visible improvement made by de Gaulle was the Malraux Law, drafted by writer and Minister of Culture André Malraux, which required the cleansing of centuries of soot and grime and restoration to original colours of the façades of the Cathedral of Notre Dame and other landmarks of Paris.

The major project of President Georges Pompidou was the Centre Georges Pompidou in the Beaubourg area of the 4th arrondissement. It is an ultramodern showcase of the contemporary arts, whose pipes, escalators ducts and other internal workings were exposed outside of the building. Pompidou's successor, Valéry Giscard d'Estaing, converted the Gare d'Orsay railway station into the Musée d'Orsay for art of the 19th century; commissioned in 1977, it was opened in 1986 under President François Mitterrand.

President François Mitterrand had fourteen years in power, enough time to complete more projects than any president since Napoleon III. His Grands Travaux included the Arab World Institute, a new site for the Bibliothèque nationale de France (BNF); a new opera house, the Opéra Bastille, opened in 1989 to celebrate the bicentennial of the French Revolution; a new Ministry of Finance in Bercy (the old Ministry had been housed in a wing of the Louvre), also opened in 1989. The Grande Arche in La Défense was also finished in 1989, a massive hollow cube-shaped building 112 metres high that completed the long perspective from the Arc de Triomphe du Carrousel through the Place de la Concorde and the Champs Élysées. The most famous project of all, the "Grand Louvre", included the expulsion of the Ministry of Finance, the reconstruction of large parts of the museum, an underground gallery, and the addition of a glass pyramid by I.M. Pei in the courtyard.

In the post-war era, Paris experienced its largest development since the end of the Belle Époque in 1914. The suburbs began to expand considerably, with the construction of large social estates known as cités and the beginning of La Défense, the business district. A comprehensive express subway network, the RER, was built to complement the Métro and serve the distant suburbs. A network of roads was developed in the suburbs centred on the Périphérique expressway encircling the city, which was completed in 1973.

=== Crisis in the banlieues ===
Beginning in the 1970s, several suburbs (banlieues) of Paris experienced deindustrialisation. The once-thriving residential cités became ghettos for African and Arab immigrants and zones with high unemployment. At the same time, some neighbourhoods within the city of Paris and the western and southern suburbs successfully shifted their economic base from traditional manufacturing to high-value-added services and high-tech manufacturing, giving these neighbourhoods the highest per-capita incomes in France and among the highest in Europe. The resulting widening economic gap between these two areas led to periodic clashes between young residents of the northeast housing projects and the police.

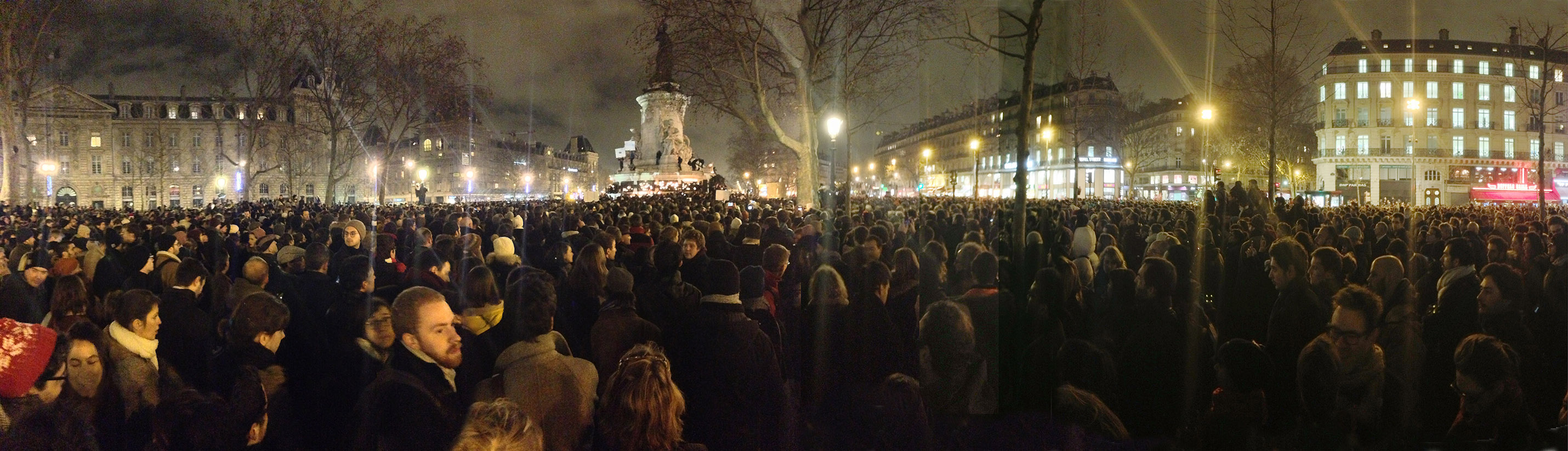
An anti-terrorism demonstration on the Place de la Republique after the Charlie Hebdo shooting (11 January 2015)

== 21st century ==
=== Economy ===
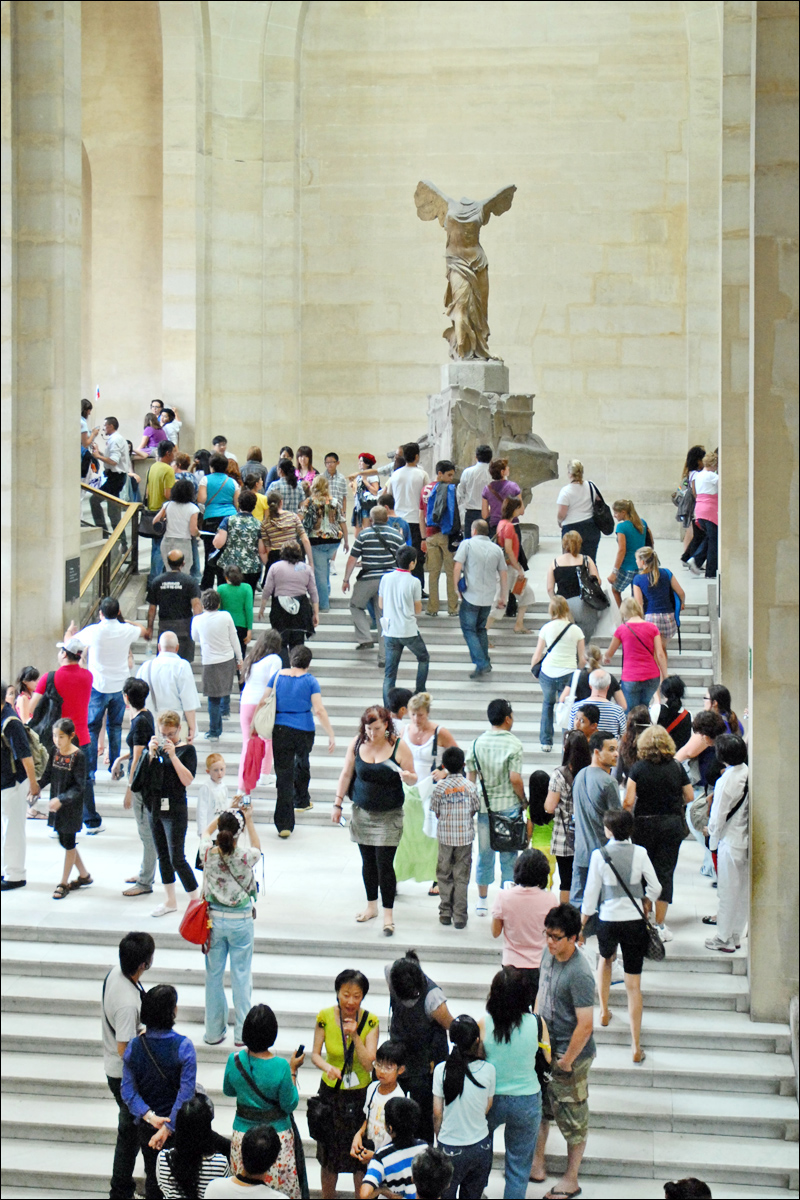
Visitors to the Louvre. Paris was one of the world's top tourist destinations in 2013.

In the first part of the 21st century, the vitality of the Paris economy made it an important financial centre and influential global city. The Paris region, including the business centre of La Défense just outside the city limits, had a 2012 GDP of €612 billion (US$760 billion). In 2011 its GDP ranked second among the regions of Europe and its per-capita GDP was the 4th highest in Europe. In 2013 it hosted the world headquarters of 29 Fortune Global 500 companies, mostly in banking, finance, insurance and business services.

Tourism was an important part of the Paris economy. In 2013, the city of Paris welcomed 29.3 million tourists, the largest number of whom came from the United States, followed by the United Kingdom, Italy, Germany and Spain. There were 550,000 visitors from Japan, a decrease from previous years, while there was a growth of 20 percent in the number of visitors from China (186,000) and the Middle East (326,000).

The Paris region received 32.3 million visitors in 2013. As a destination for upscale European shopping, Paris was especially important. In 2014, visitors to Paris spent $17 billion (€13.58 billion), the third-highest sum globally after London and New York.

Fashion and luxury goods also made an important contribution to the Paris economy. In 2014 Paris was the home of the world's largest cosmetics company, L'Oréal, and three of the five top global makers of luxury fashion accessories; Louis Vuitton, Hermès and Cartier.

According to one study produced in 2009, Paris was the third most economically powerful city in the world among the 35 major cities in the study, ranking behind London and New York. The study ranked Paris first in terms of quality of life, and accessibility; third in cultural life, sixth in terms of economy, and seventh in research and development. Another study in 2012 grouped Paris with New York, London, and Tokyo as the four leading global cities. This study concluded that Paris ranked as the third global city for accountancy and management consultancy, network connectivity, and airline connections, and was fifth in terms of insurance.

=== Politics ===
In March 2001, Bertrand Delanoë became the first socialist mayor of Paris and the first openly gay mayor of the city. The socialists and their allies dominated city politics for the next thirteen years: Delanoë was re-elected in 2008, and on 5 April 2014, Anne Hidalgo, another socialist, was elected first female mayor of Paris. In 2020, Paris mayor Anne Hidalgo was re-elected. The two mayors made social issues and the environment a priority. In 2007, in an effort to reduce car traffic in the city, Mayor Delanoë introduced the Vélib', a system that rents bicycles at low cost for the use of local residents and visitors. To discourage automobile traffic, the city administration increased parking fees and added new restrictions on driving in the city. Between 2008 and 2013, the city converted a section of the highway along the Seine between the Pont de l'Alma and the Musée d'Orsay into a public park called the Promenade des Berges de la Seine. By early 2021, a number of Hidalgo's policies had gained international attention, such as her proposal to remove over half of Paris's car parking spaces and turn the Champs-Élysées into a "fantastic garden". In 2026, Emmanuel Grégoire was elected mayor, continuing the socialist grip on power.

=== Culture ===
In 2013, the Louvre was the most-visited art museum in the world, and the Centre Georges Pompidou was the most-visited museum of modern art.

A new national museum, The Musée du quai Branly, opened in 2006. It was the presidential grand project of Jacques Chirac, designed by architect Jean Nouvel to showcase the indigenous art of Africa, Oceania, Asia and the Americas.

A new private museum, the Contemporary Art museum of the Louis Vuitton Foundation, designed by architect Frank Gehry, opened in October 2014 in the Bois de Boulogne. On 14 January 2015, President Hollande inaugurated a new symphony hall, the Philharmonie de Paris, also designed by architect Jean Nouvel. The hall opened with a performance by the Orchestre de Paris of the Requiem of Gabriel Fauré, played to honour the victims of the Charlie Hebdo shooting that took place in the city a week earlier. It is located in the Parc de la Villette in the 19th arrondissement. The new concert hall cost 386 million Euros. It was completed in seven years, two years longer than planned, and at three times the original planned cost. The architect did not attend the opening, protesting that the opening was rushed, the hall was not finished, and that the acoustics had not been properly tested, though journalists at the opening reported that the sound quality was perfectly clear. The architecture critic of The Guardian wrote that the building looked like a space ship that had crashed in France.

On 15 April 2019, the roof of the Notre-Dame de Paris caught fire, severely damaging the bell towers and resulting in the total collapse of the central spire and roof.

In 2024, the city hosted the Summer Olympics for a third time. Events were scheduled to be held in the Seine, despite swimming in the river being banned since 1923; a €1.4 billion cleanup effort by the French government sought to reduce bacterial levels in the Seine to those safe for swimming. In 2024, Paris also hosted the Summer Paralympics for the first time.

=== Social unrest and terrorism ===
While Paris and the Paris region have some of the wealthiest neighbourhoods in France, it also has some of the poorest, particularly in the suburbs to the north and east, where many residents are immigrants or children of immigrants from the Maghreb and sub-Saharan Africa. Between 27 October and 14 November 2005, in what became known as the 2005 French riots, young residents of low-income housing projects in Clichy-sous-Bois, a Paris suburb, rioted, after two young men fleeing the police were accidentally electrocuted. The riots gradually spread to other suburbs and then across France, as rioters burned schools, day-care centres and other government buildings and almost nine thousand cars. The riots caused an estimated 200 million Euros in property damage, and led to almost three thousand arrests. On 14 November 2005, as the riots ended, President Jacques Chirac blamed the rioters for a lack of respect for the law and French values, but also condemned inequalities in French society and "the poison of racism".

On 7 January 2015, two Muslim extremists, both French citizens raised in the Paris region, attacked the Paris headquarters of Charlie Hebdo, a controversial satirical magazine that had poked ridicule at Mohammed, in what became known as the Charlie Hebdo shooting. They killed ten civilians, including five prominent cartoonists and the director of the magazine and two police officers. On 8–9 January, a third terrorist killed five more. Collectively known as the January 2015 Île-de-France attacks, these were the deadliest terrorist attacks in Paris since 1961. On 11 January, an estimated 1.5 million persons marched in Paris to show solidarity against terrorism and in defense of freedom of speech.

The attacks intensified the decades-old debate in the Paris press about immigration, integration and freedom of speech. The New York Times summarised the ongoing debate:

So as France grieves, it is also faced with profound questions about its future: How large is the radicalized part of the country's Muslim population, the largest in Europe? How deep is the rift between France's values of secularism, of individual, sexual and religious freedom, of freedom of the press and the freedom to shock, and a growing Muslim conservatism that rejects many of these values in the name of religion?

On 13 November 2015, there were simultaneous terrorist attacks in Paris conducted by three coordinated teams of terrorists. They sprayed several sidewalk cafes with machine-gun fire, set off bombs near the Stade de France, and killed 89 persons at the Bataclan theater, where a concert by the Eagles of Death Metal rock band had begun. The combined attacks killed 130 persons and injured more than 350. Seven terrorists killed themselves by setting off explosive vests. On the morning of November 18, three suspected terrorists, including Abdelhamid Abaaoud, the alleged mastermind of the attacks, were killed in a shootout with police in the Paris suburb of Saint-Denis. French president François Hollande declared that France was in a nationwide state of emergency, reestablished controls at the borders, and brought fifteen hundred soldiers into Paris. Schools, universities and other public institutions in Paris were closed for several days. It was the single most deadly terrorist attack in French history.

=== Grand Paris renovation ===
In 2008, Nicolas Sarkozy announced the Grand Paris renovation, a renovation so large in scale that Paris had never undergone before, surpassing even that of Haussmann around 150 years prior. The renovation started in 2016 and is set to end in 2030.

== Maps show city growth (508 to 1750) ==
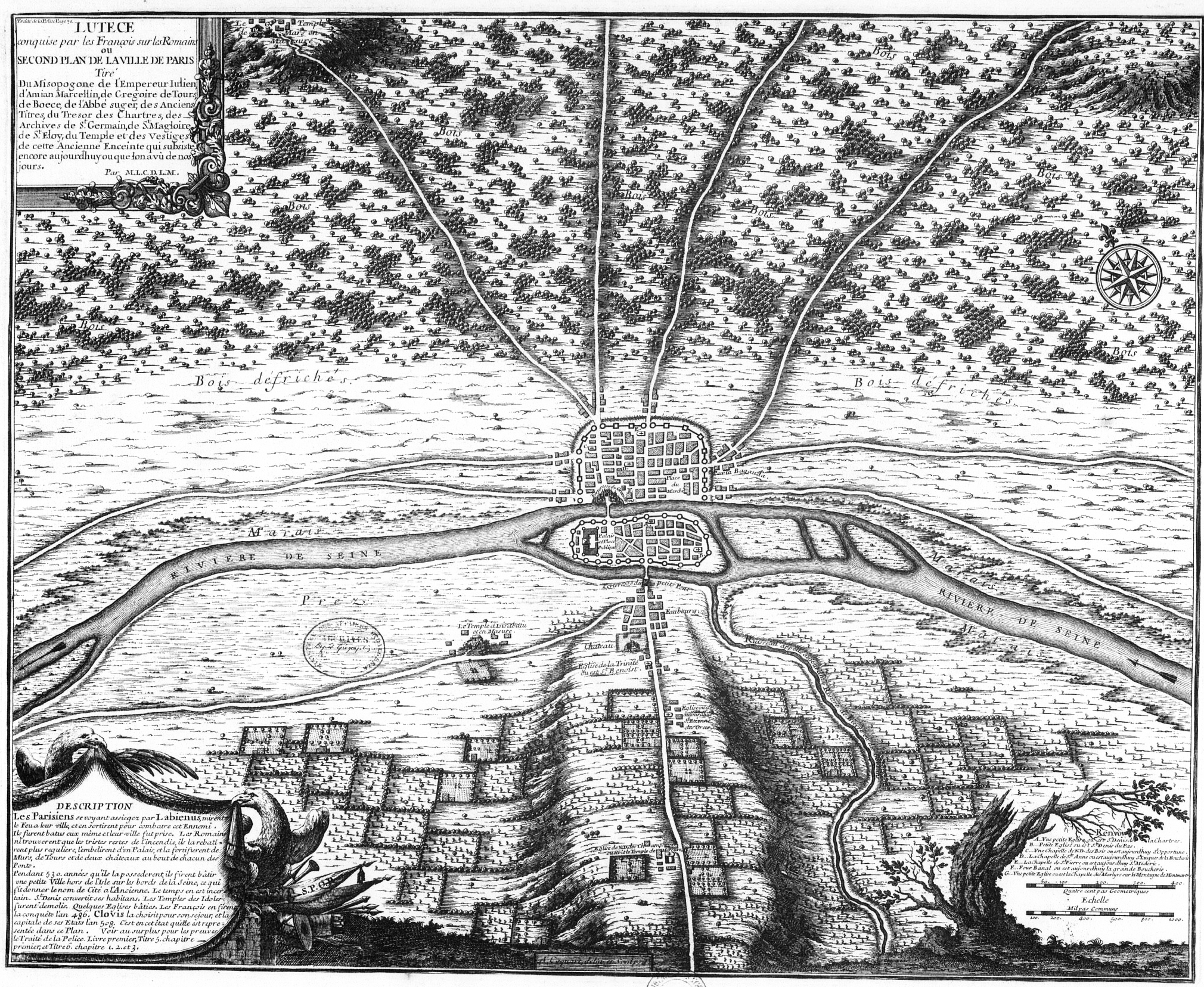
Map of Paris in 508 AD, at the time of the first Frankish kings, the second of eight chronological maps of Paris from Nicolas de La Mare's Traité de la police, as drawn in 1705. (BNF Gallica)

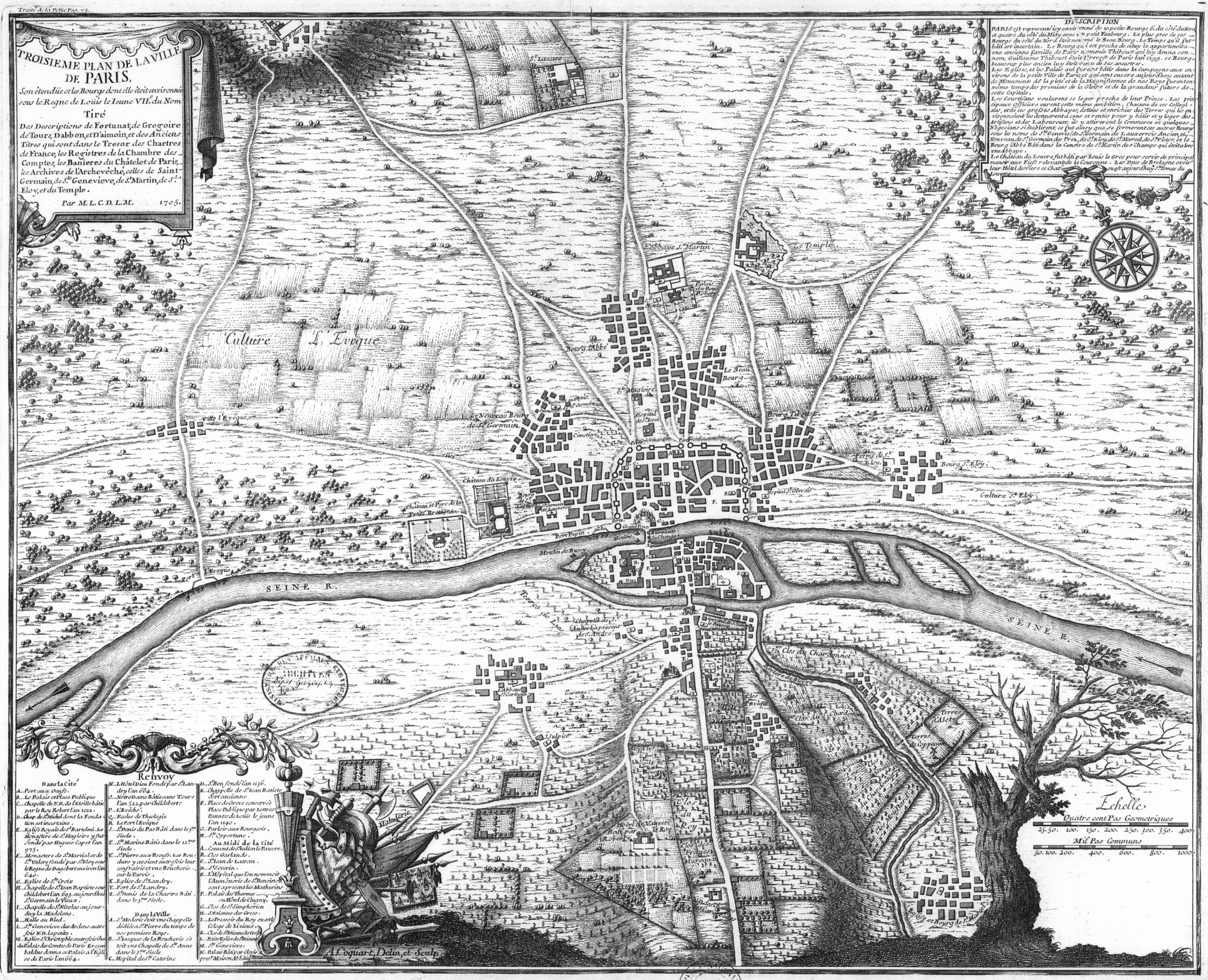
Paris circa 1180, the third of eight chronological maps of Paris from Nicolas de La Mare's Traité de la police. (BNF Gallica)

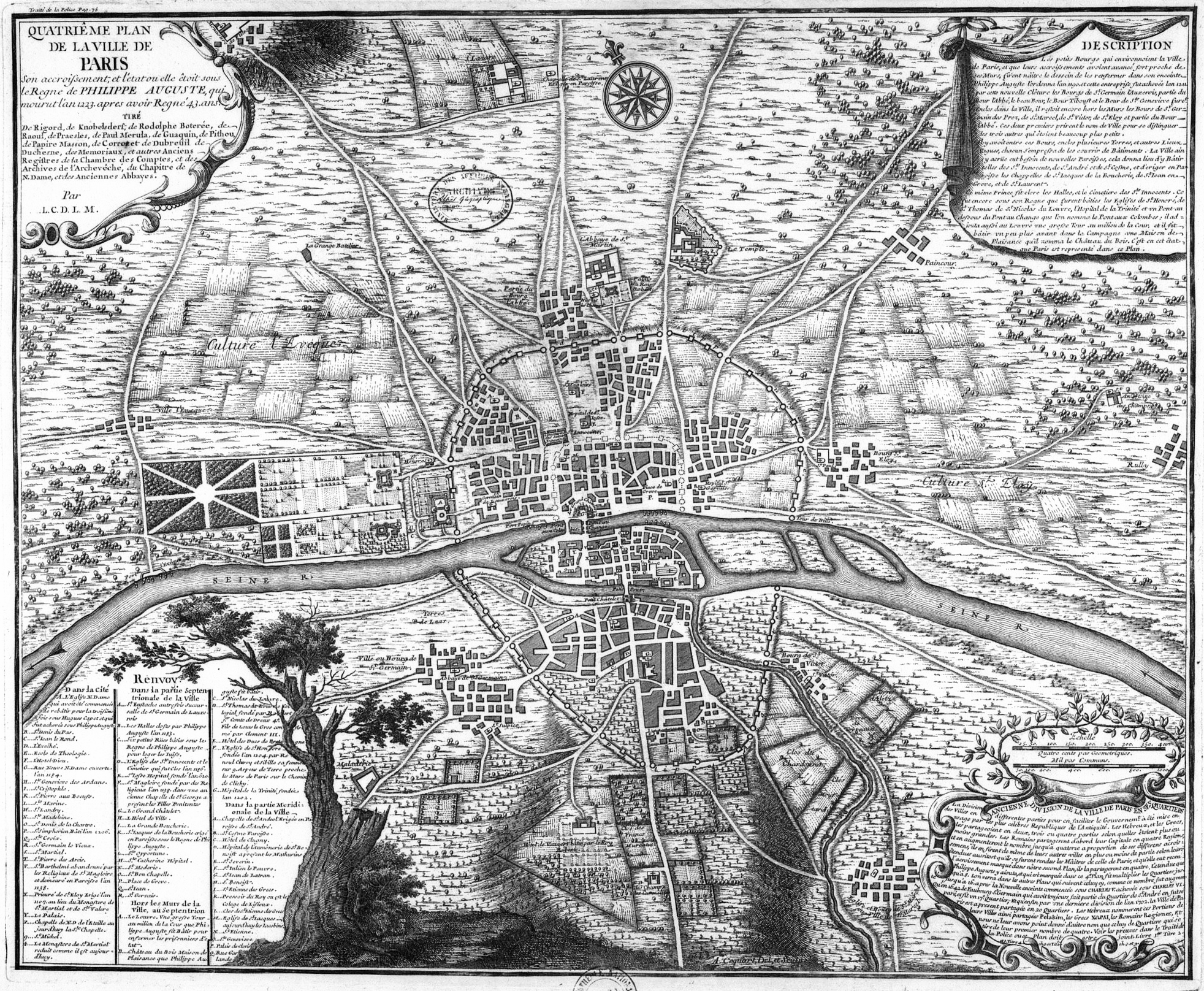
Paris circa 1223, the fourth of eight chronological maps of Paris from Nicolas de La Mare's Traité de la police. (BNF Gallica)

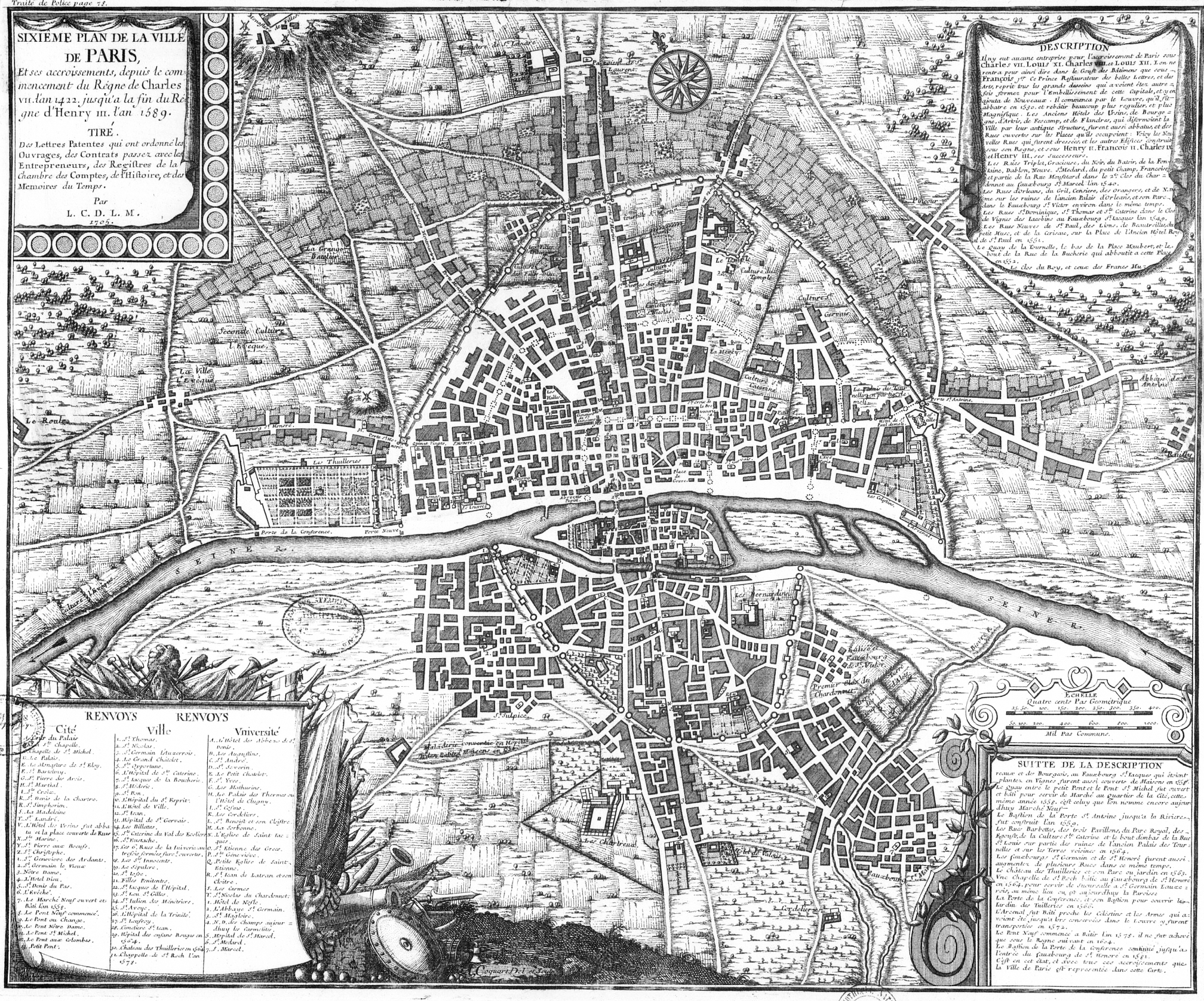
Evolution of the city from 1422 to 1589, the sixth of eight chronological maps of Paris from Nicolas de La Mare's Traité de la police. (BNF Gallica)

A perspective drawing of Paris in 1618 by Claes Jansz. Visscher.

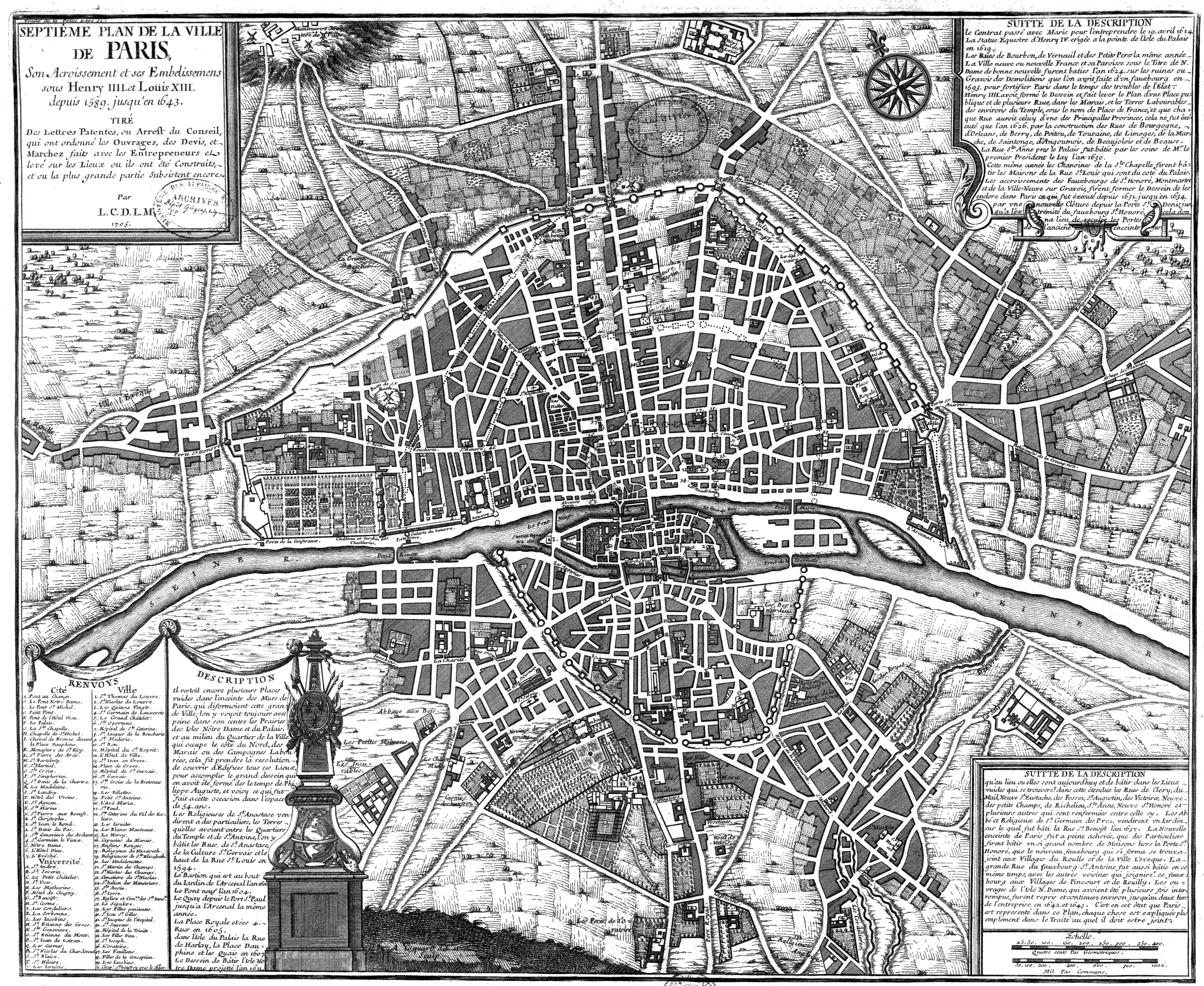
Evolution of the city from 1589 to 1643, the seventh of eight chronological maps of Paris from Nicolas de La Mare's Traité de la police. (BNF Gallica)

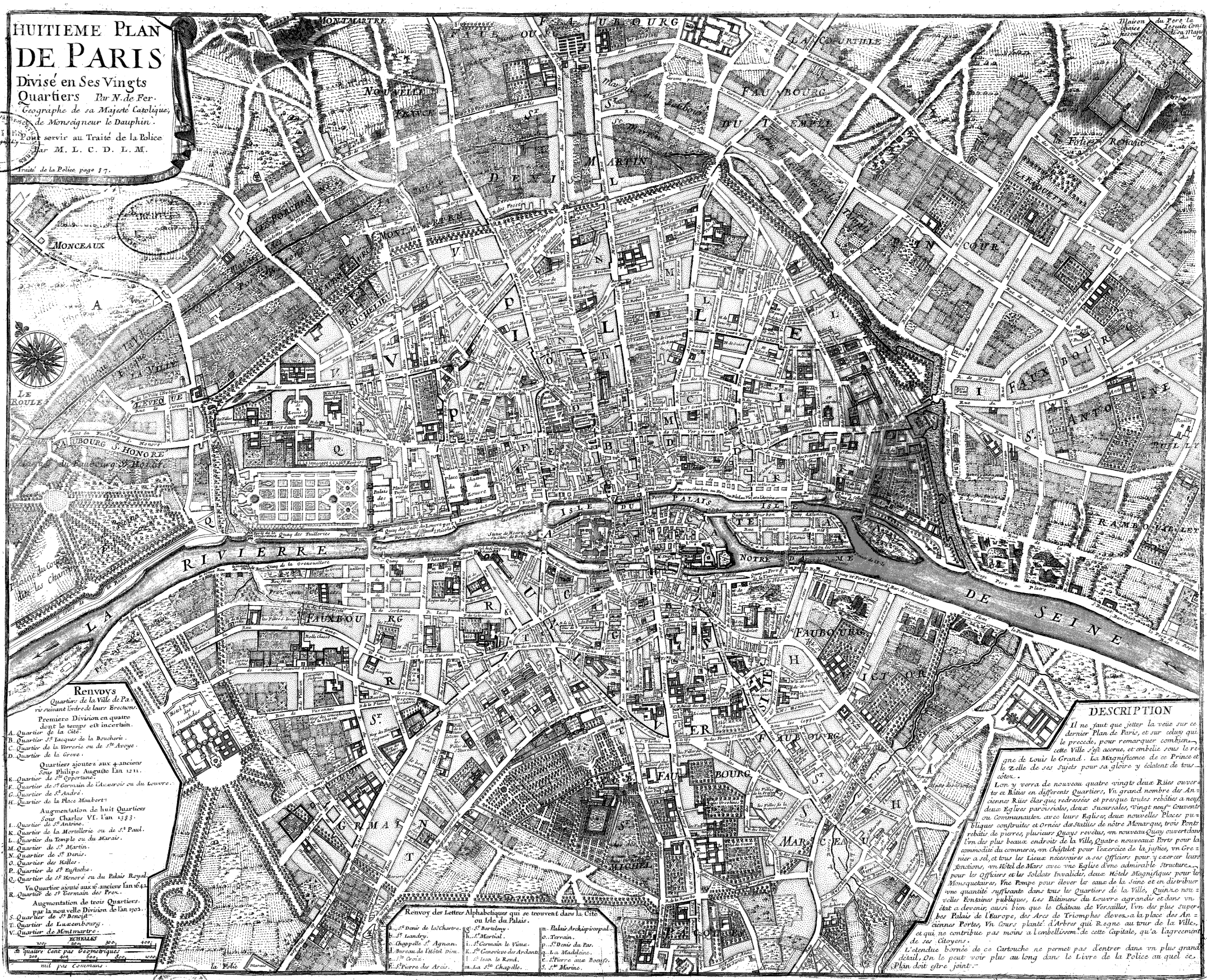
Paris divided in its twenty quarters, 1705, the eighth of eight chronological maps of Paris from Nicolas de La Mare's Traité de la police, by Nicolas de Fer. (BNF Gallica)

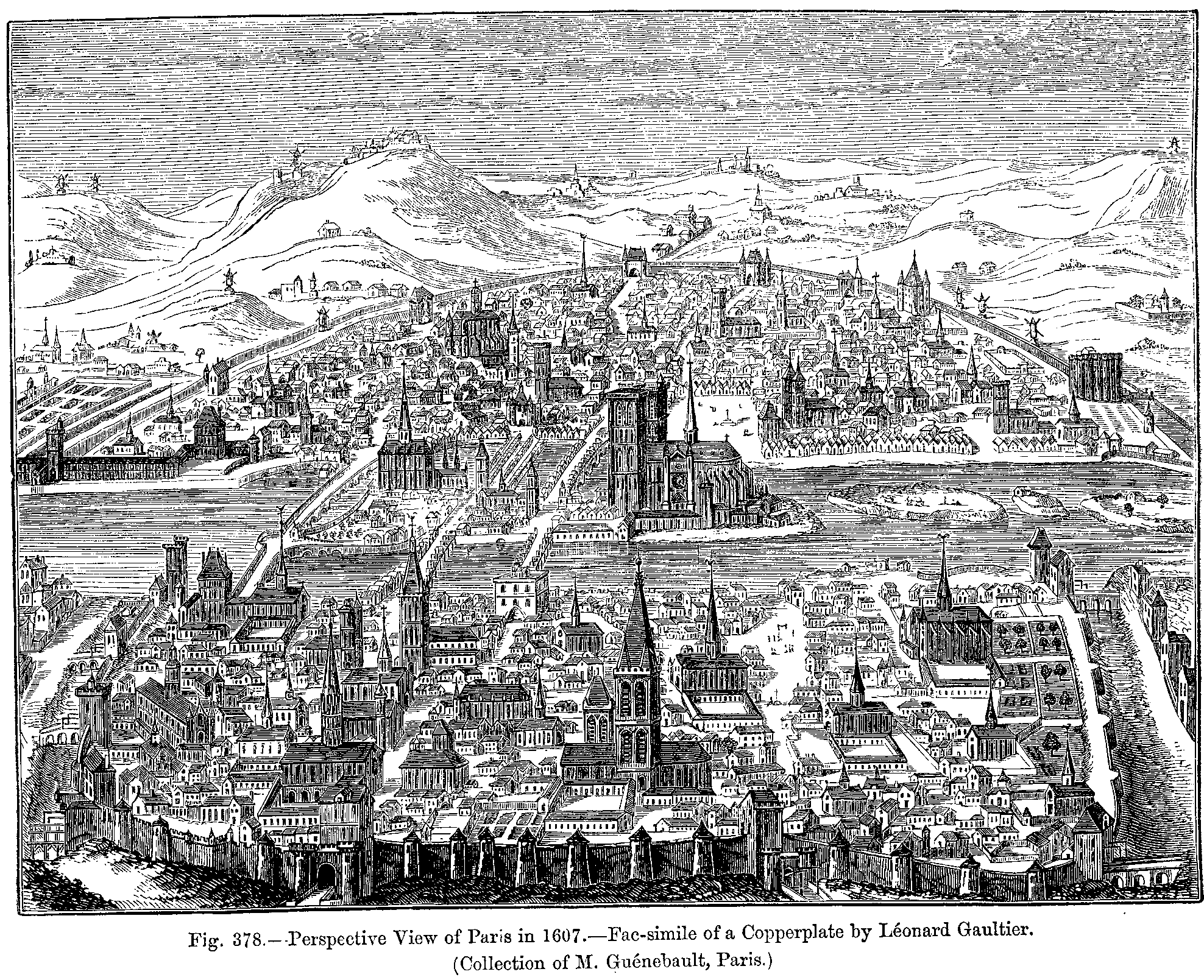
Perspective View of Paris in 1607: Facsimile of a copper-plate by Léonard Gaultier. (Collection of M. Guénebault, Paris)

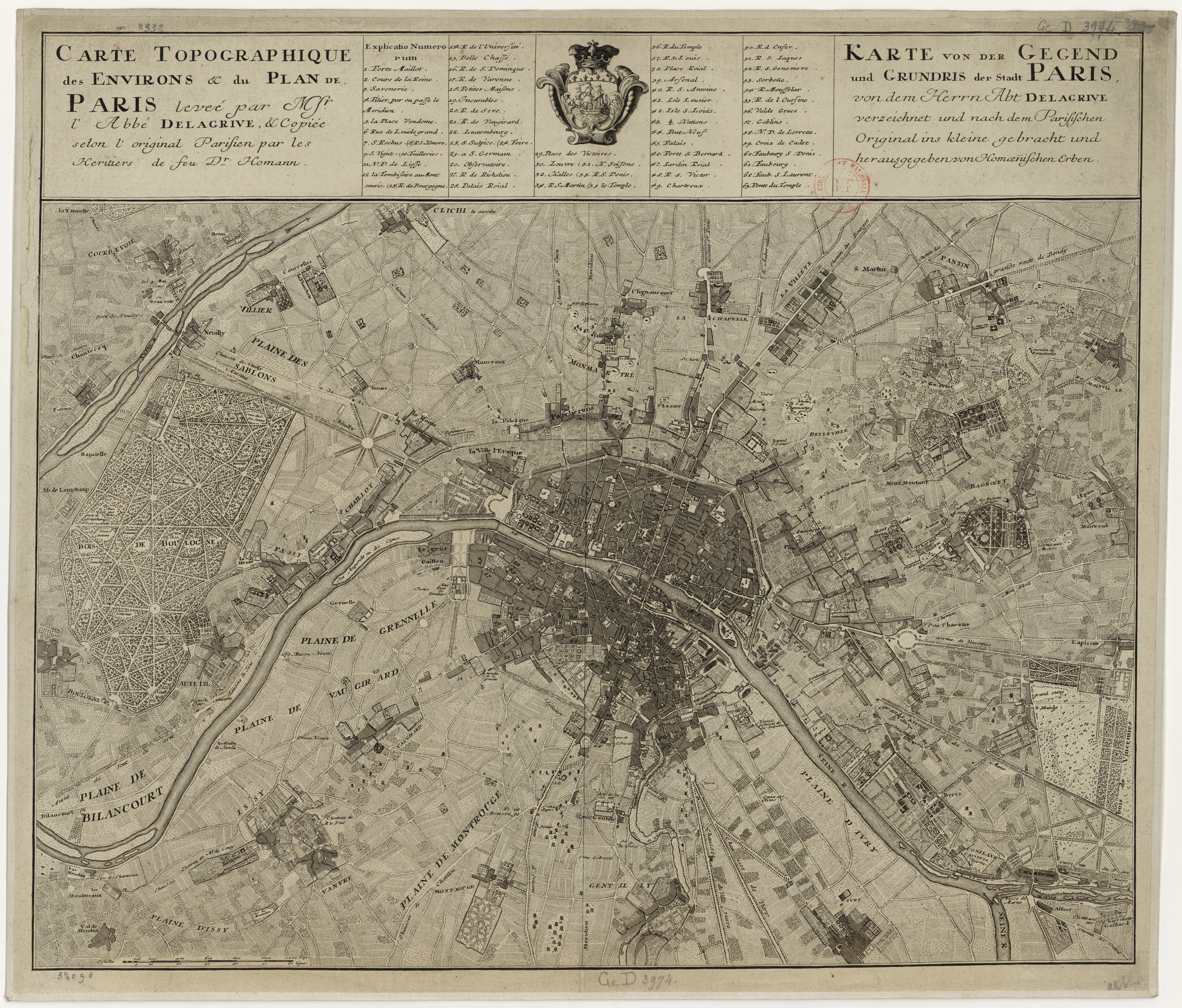
Map of Paris and its vicinity c. 1735, by Jean Delagrive (1689–1757). (BNF Gallica)

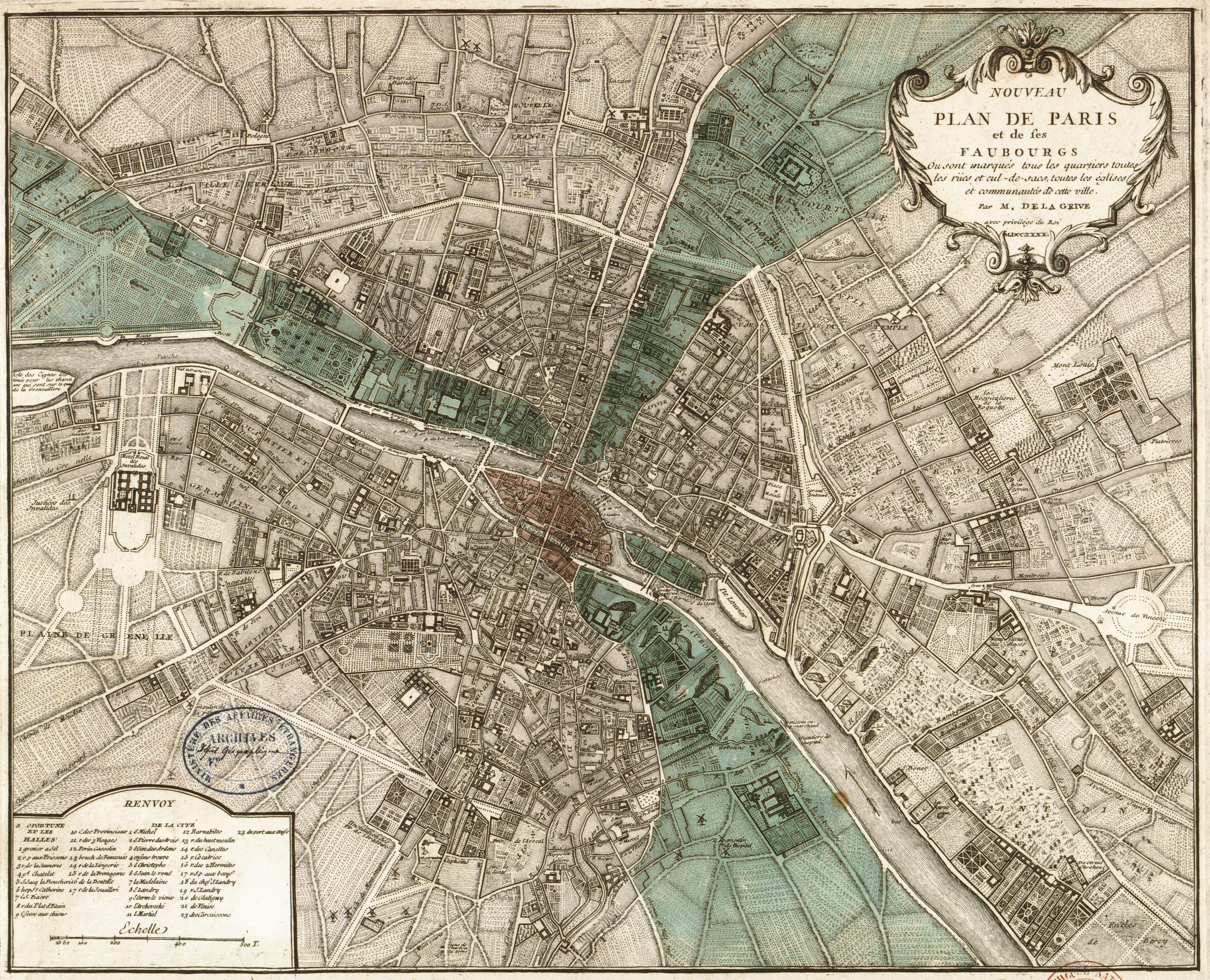
Paris in 1740, by Jean Delagrive (1689–1757). (BNF Gallica)

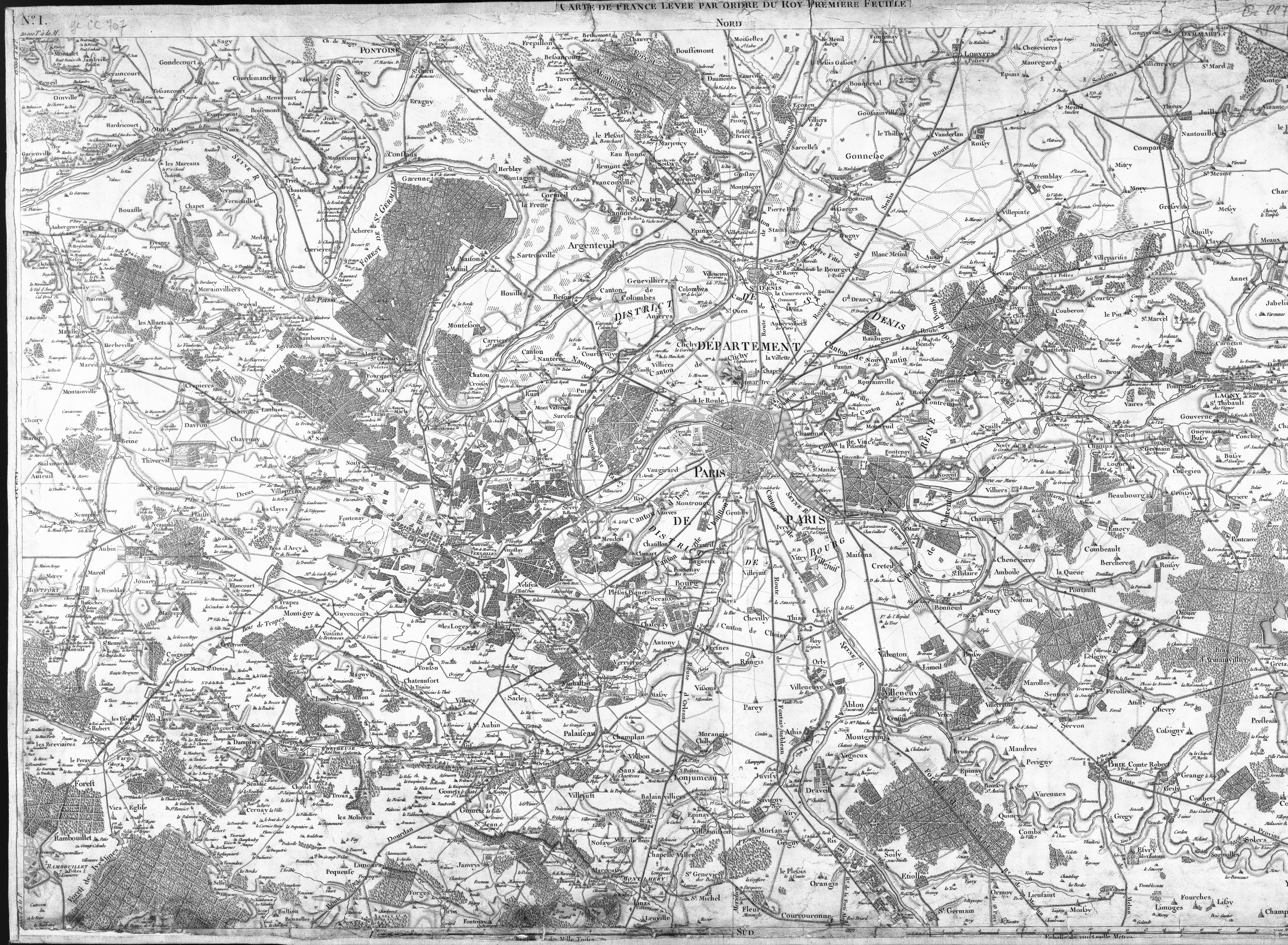
Paris and suburbs in 1750, by César-François Cassini de Thury. (BNF Gallica)

== See also ==
- Writers in Paris
- Architecture of Paris
- Demographics of Paris
- History of France
- Grand Paris
- Paris chronology
- History of parks and gardens of Paris
- History of music in Paris
- Timeline of Paris
- Palais de la Cité
- Saint-Pierre-des-Arcis Church
