= Scale models of the Bastille =

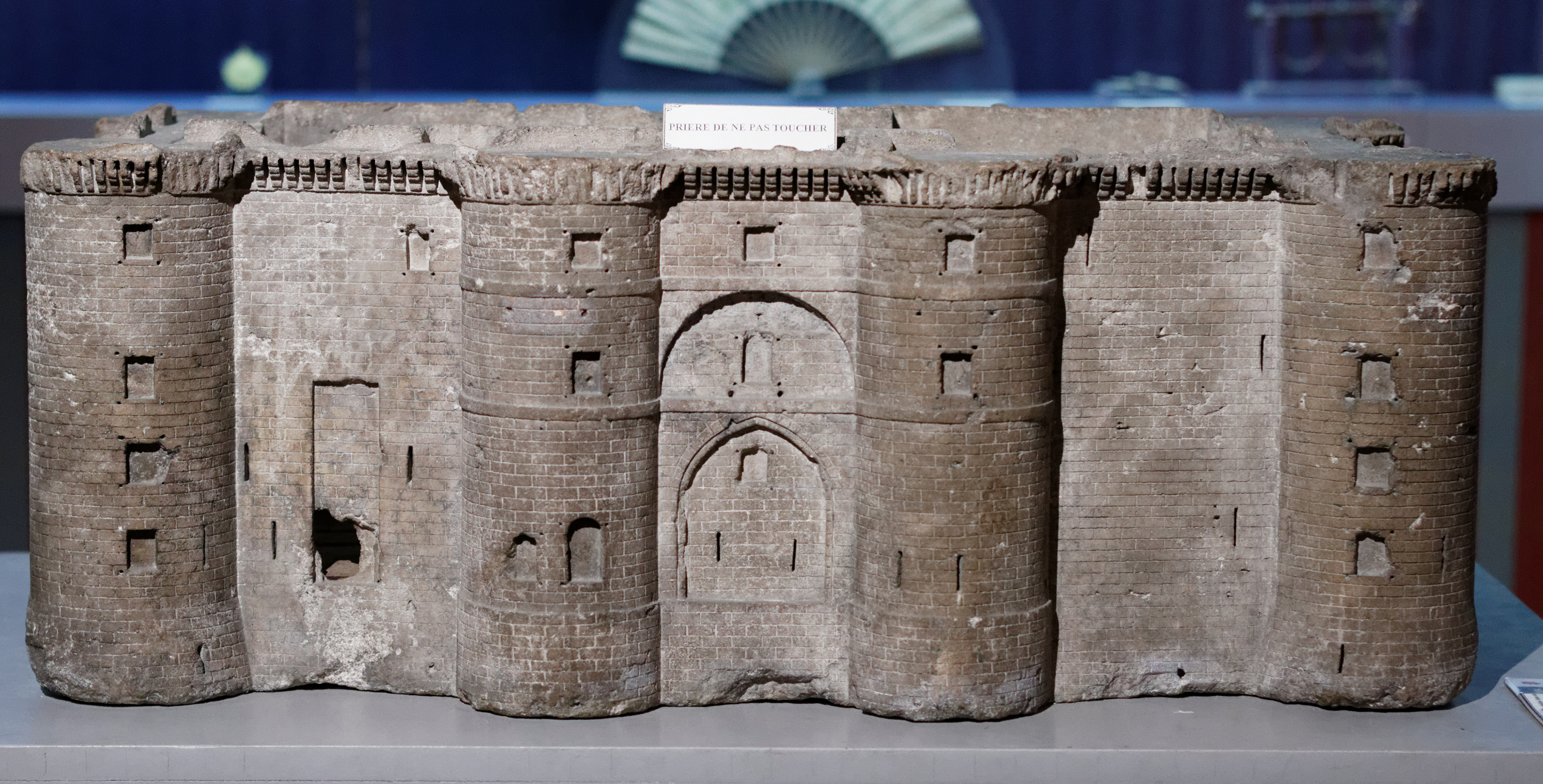
Musée Carnavalet in Paris.

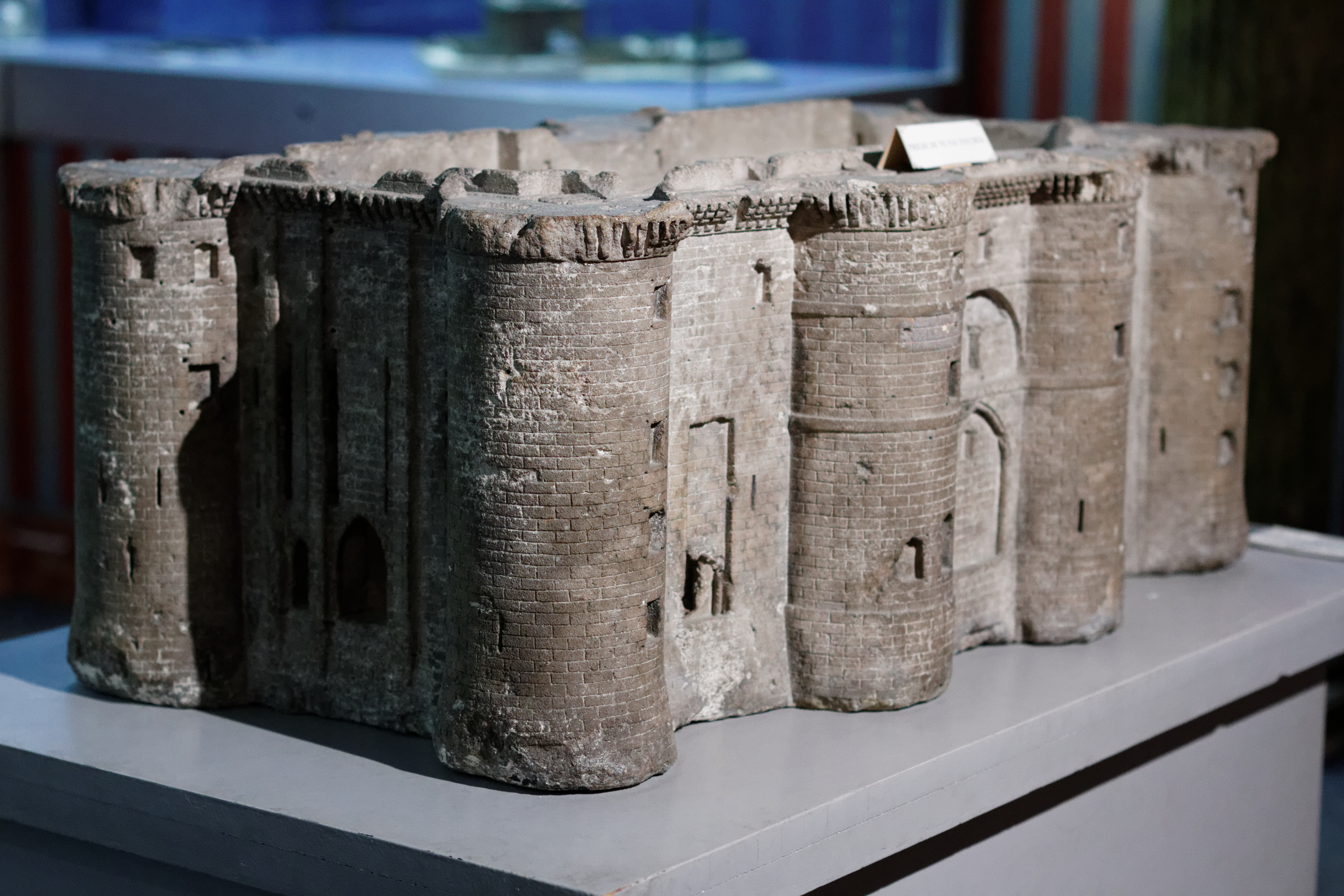
Musée Carnavalet in Paris.

Scale models of the Bastille were produced between 1789 and 1790 by the businessman Pierre-François Palloy using stones from the demolition of the Bastille, the building they portray.

== History ==
Following the fall of the Bastille on 14 July 1789 Palloy decided to take charge of its demolition, gaining official authorisation to do so on 16 July and completing work on 21 May 1791. Stones from the former fortress were used on several building projects, notably Pont de la Concorde, but Palloy also converted salvaged stones and other materials into souvenirs, such as stone plaques made from stones from the dungeons, medals made from chains and so on, thus launching a fashion for representations of the fall.

When the 83 départements were founded at the end of 1789 Palloy decided to make a scale model of the Bastille from its stones for each of the départements' capitals. He set up a studio dedicated to producing them, initially carved from the stones, then mass-produced by casting a mix of stone powder and mortar. He offered the scale models to the départements at the end of 1790, sending with them other products and an "apostle of Liberty" (an association set up by Palloy himself), who would give a speech when the gifts were handed over. Scale models were also offered to government ministers, to Louis XVI and to foreign dignitaries such as George Washington (his is still on display at Mount Vernon).

The scale models were around 40 cm high, 100 cm wide and 60 cm deep and were presented to the public at patriotic festivals and contributed to turning the Bastille's fall into a republican myth and symbol of liberty.

== Surviving examples ==
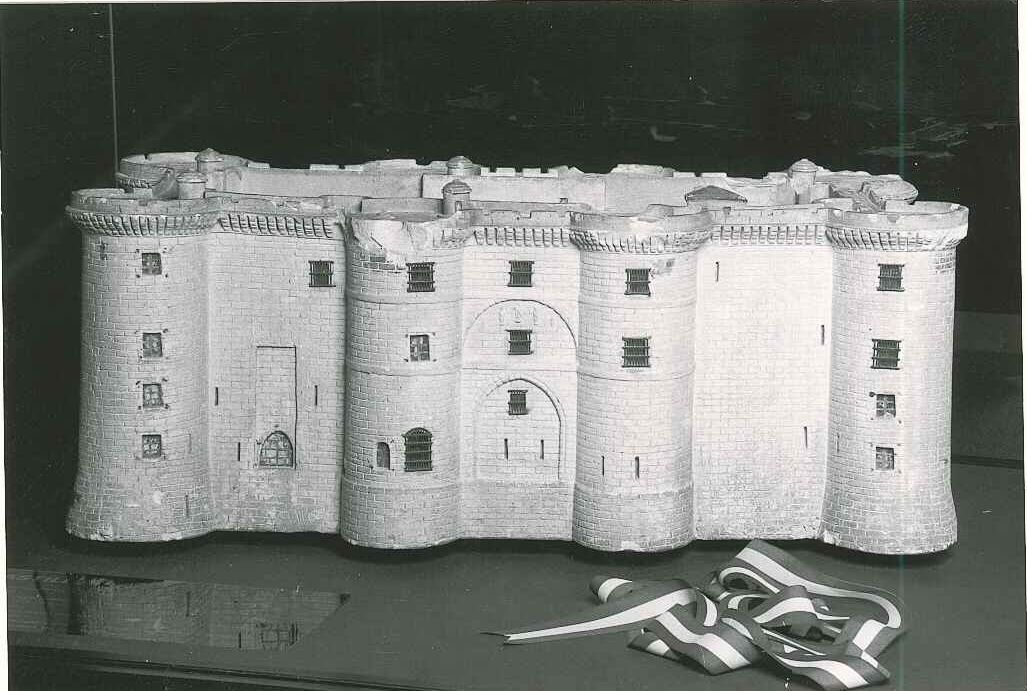
Musée d'art et d'histoire de Saint-Brieuc

Surviving examples include :

- Auch : Archives départementales du Gers
- Chartres : Musée des beaux-arts de Chartres
- Nancy : Musée lorrain (Palais des Ducs de Lorraine)
- Nantes : Musée Dobrée
- Pau : Archives départementales des Pyrénées-Atlantiques.
- Paris : musée Carnavalet
- Paris : Musée des Archives nationales
- Quimper : Musée départemental breton
- Le Puy-en-Velay : musée Crozatier
- Rouen : musée départemental des antiquités
- Tours : hôtel Goüin
- Tulle: garden of the museum cloister
- Valence : musée des beaux-arts
- Vannes : Archives départementales du Morbihan
- Versailles : salle du Jeu de paume
- Vizille : salle de l'été 1789, musée de la Révolution française
- Saint-Brieuc : musée d'art et d'histoire de Saint-Brieuc (not on display)
- Coutances : Musée Quesnel-Morinière

== Bibliography ==
- (in French) Jean-Pierre Babelon, 'Les maquettes et les pierres de la Bastille. Récolement des souvenirs lapidaires provenant de l'activité du patriote Pallo', La Gazette des archives, 1965
