= Jean Albert d'Archambaud =

French priest

- Portrait of Jean Albert d'Archambaud
- Title: Abbé Bucquoy

Personal life
- Born: c. 1650 Champagne, France
- Died: 14 November 1740 (aged 90) Hanover, Kingdom of Hanover
- Known for: Escaping from the Bastille
- Occupation: Writer, clergyman

Religious life
- Religion: Catholic Church
- Order: Trappists

Jean Albert d'Archambaud, comte de Bucquoy, better known as the Abbé Bucquoy (c.1650 – 14 November 1740), was a French clergyman known for his adventures.

== Biography ==
Born in Champagne around 1650 into a noble family originally from Artois, Bucquoy was orphaned at the age of four; his early education was subsequently neglected. His family had a military background: a notable relation was Charles-Bonaventure de Longueval, also comte de Bucquoy (1571 – 1621), who had distinguished himself as a general in the service of the Spanish King Philip II during the Thirty Years' War. Jean Albert decided to pursue a military career as well.

He had completed five years of service, and was twenty-two years old, when a perceived miracle helped him escape from a highly dangerous situation. This caused him to decide to take religious vows and become a Trappist monk at La Trappe Abbey. However, the austerity of the monastic lifestyle, compounded by additional voluntary practices of asceticism taken on by Bucquoy, weakened Bucquoy's health to such a degree that the abbot sent him away. Bucquoy then began a mendicant existence, at first in Paris, then afterwards in Rouen, where he founded a school for the poor. The Jesuits in Rouen were struck by his eloquence, and tried to induce him to join their order. Bucquoy resisted these overtures. Soon after, an officer with whom he had formerly served having recognized him by chance, he left his school behind and returned to Paris. There Bucquoy resolved to found a new order with the project of combatting skepticism and spreading the faith. It was probably at this time that he adopted the title of Abbé.

However, the studies he pursued with this aim ended up by undermining his faith, and in 1704 Bucquoy decided to return to military service. He was getting ready to raise a regiment when his preaching against despotism and abuse of power, and in favor of a band of faux-saulniers (salt smugglers), led in his arrest. It has been reported that his initial arrest was due to being mistaken for the Abbé de la Bourlie, and that had it not been for further statements made while under arrest, as well as a foiled escape attempt, he would have been released. He was then imprisoned at For-l'Évêque, where he made his first successful escape, by burning a hole in the door to his cell and climbing down the wall of the prison by means of a makeshift rope. He evaded capture for nine months in Paris, but was re-arrested while attempting to leave France.

Bucquoy was then taken to the Bastille, where he was put under rigorous surveillance. On 4 May 1709, after four years in prison there, he escaped; the daring nature of this exploit, and its subsequent colorful documentation by Madame du Noyer, have earned Bucquoy his legacy. He then passed into Switzerland, where he petitioned to recover his seized assets and to reconcile with the authorities in France. Having failed at this, he traveled to Holland, and then to various German courts, where he was received with the recommendation of Johann Matthias von der Schulenburg. By 1714 Bucquoy was installed in Hanover, where George I, who enjoyed his conversation, bestowed on him a pension; but in 1717 Bucquoy was still writing to France to try to resolve his legal situation so that he could return to his home country. In 1719 he published his own narrative of his escape from the Bastille.

In the final years of his life, Bucquoy became rather misanthropic; he stopped grooming his beard, and through other eccentric behavior lost much of his social esteem. After the suicide of Lord Scarborough, Bucquoy published a Latin poem on the "question of suicide," promising a monetary reward to whoever could resolve or refute it, but because he was regarded as mentally unstable no one entered the running.

Bucquoy died suddenly on 14 November 1740, at the age of around 90. He left a significant sum of money to the Catholic Church, with which he died in communion.

== Legacy ==
The French writer Gérard de Nerval told Bucquoy's story in Les Faux Saulniers (1850): a reworked version of this narrative (Angélique), in which the narrator's search for Madame du Noyer's book plays a central role, is included in his short story collection Les Filles du feu. Bucquoy also figures in Nerval's Les Illuminés (1852) as a "precursor of socialism."

== Works ==
- L'Antimachiavelisme ou Reflexions metaphisiques sur l'authorité en général et sur le pouvoir arbitraire en particulier, 1717 read online on Gallica
- Événement des plus rares, ou L'histoire du Sr abbé Cte de Buquoy : singulièrement son évasion du Fort-l'Évêque et de la Bastille, l'allemand à côté, revue et augmentée, 1719 read online on Gallica
- De la vraie et de la fausse religion, 1732
- Méditations sur la mort et la gloire, 1736
- Histoire de mon évasion, 1719
