= Pierre-François Palloy =

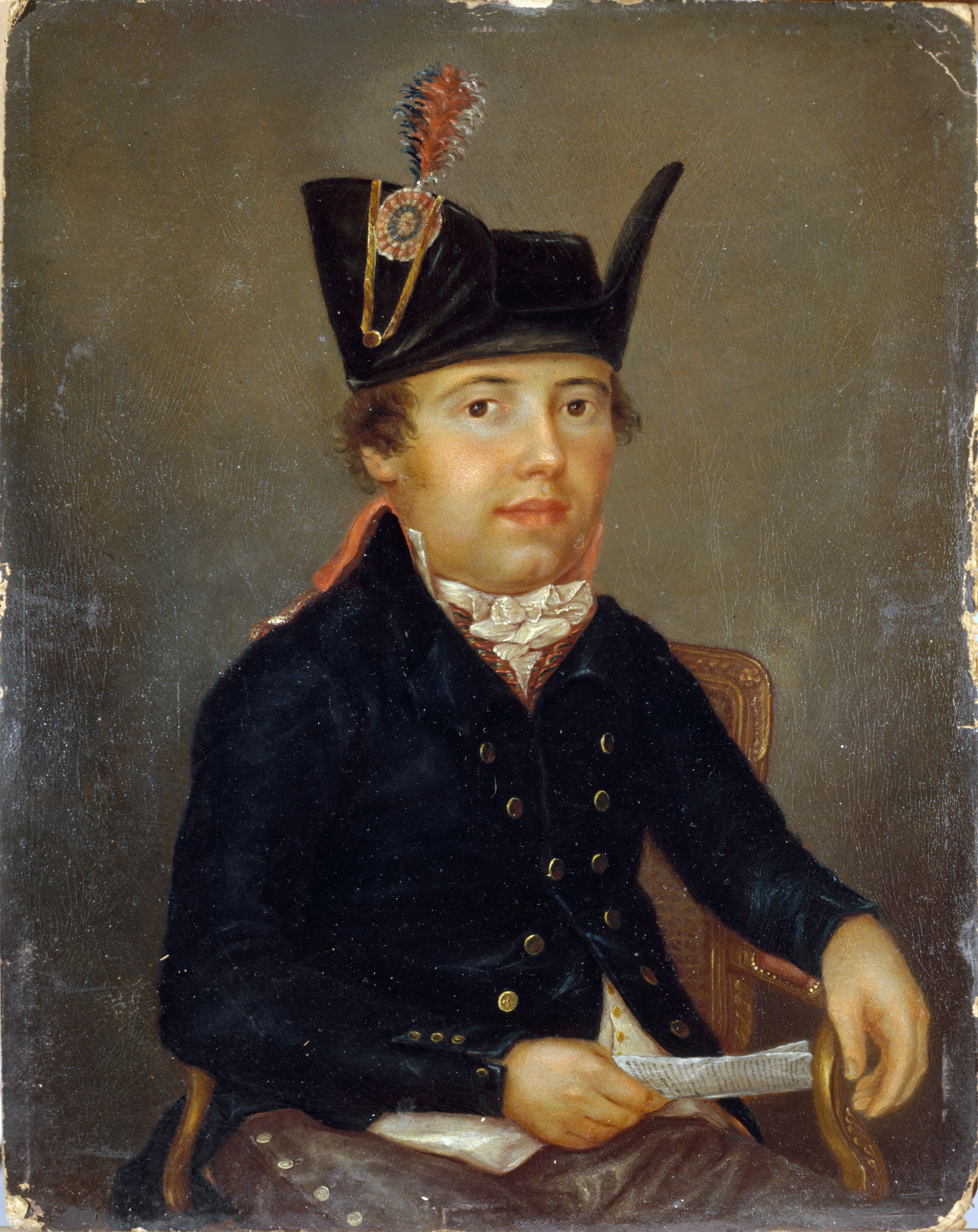
Pierre-François Palloy

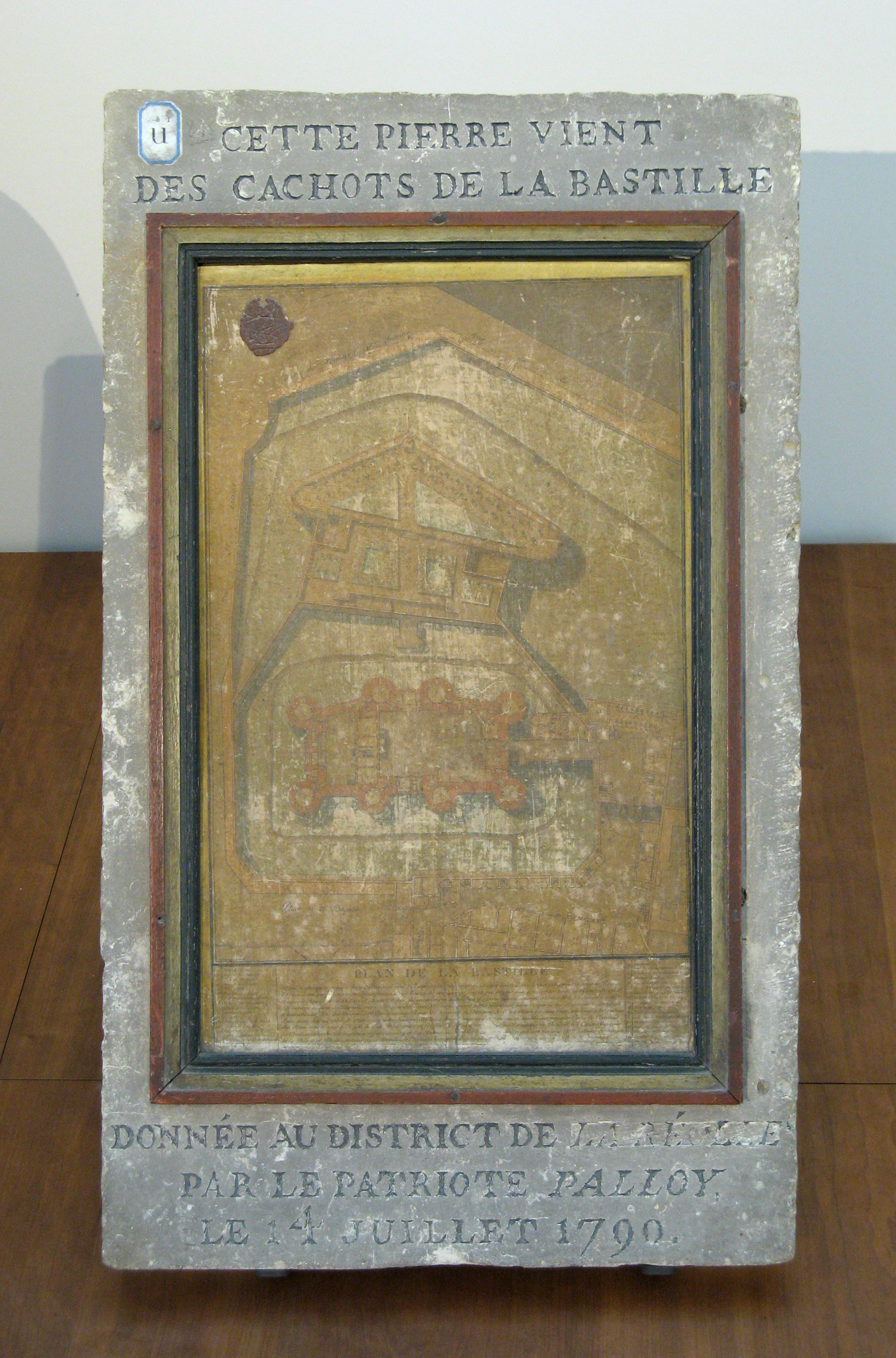
Stone from the Bastille, presented by Palloy to the district of La Réolle

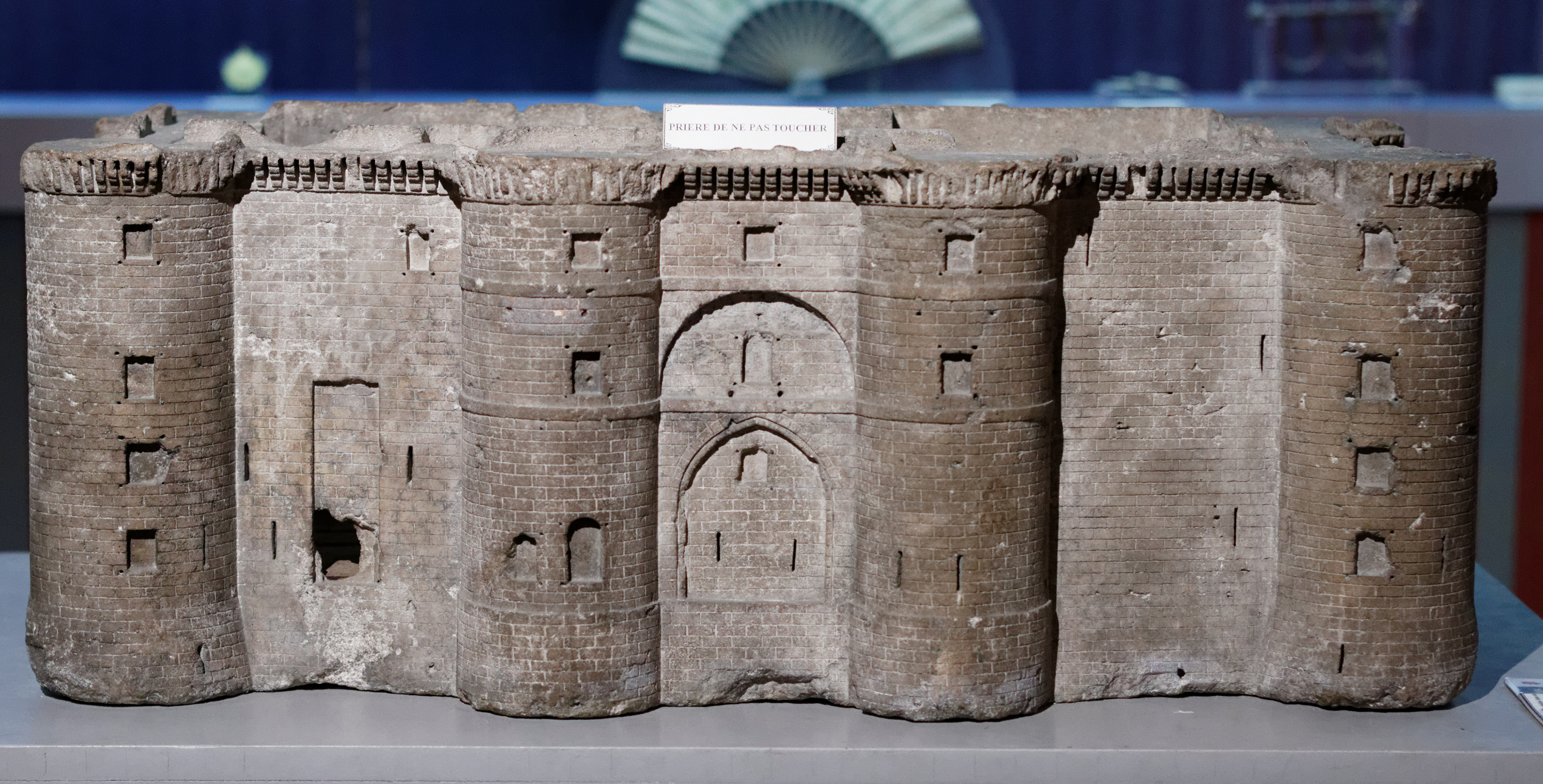
One of Palloy's models made from a stone from the Bastille

Pierre-François Palloy (23 January 1755 – 1835), self-styled as Palloy Patriote (Palloy the Patriot), was an entrepreneurial building contractor remembered for the demolition of the Bastille.

== Life ==
Palloy was born in 1755 in Paris. Both his parents came from bourgeois families active in the wine retailing industry. Palloy was educated at the College d'Harcourt, where many of the students were from upper-class liberal backgrounds. He left school at the age of fifteen to join the French Royal Army as a cadet and then as an officer. On leaving this career at the age of twenty, he married the daughter of a building contractor and joined the trade himself, eventually taking over his new family's business. By 1789 he had made the company one of the largest building firms in Paris, employing 400 workers.

=== Demolition of the Bastille ===
When the Bastille fell on 14 July 1789 there was some debate as to what should replace it, or indeed if it should remain as a monument to the past. However, Palloy knew exactly what he wanted to do and by that evening had begun the process of dismantling the structure; he secured the contract to demolish the building two days later. Most of the building was removed over the subsequent months by approximately 1,000 workers. The dimension stones were reused for the construction of the Pont de la Concorde.

Although Palloy did not receive the official payment for several years, he knew how to profit from the possession of such an iconic structure in the meantime. Staff conducted tours, for a fee, to show the public around the basements and dungeons with skeletons as props. Palloy labelled himself a patriot and emphasised the symbolism of the Bastille, writing speeches, painting pictures, and even arranging celebratory festivals and theatrical reconstructions of the day the Bastille fell. He sold other parts as souvenirs including replica Bastilles made from the stones of the building itself. He even sent examples of these miniatures to each of the 83 departments asking only to be reimbursed for transport and postage.

=== Later life ===
In early 1794 Palloy was held in prison on charges of embezzlement and of being a Hébertist, but was released after two months. In 1814 he was awarded the Décoration du Lys.
