= Bastille (fortification) =

A bastille is a form of urban fortification, generally located at the principal entrance to a town or city; as such it is a similar type of fortification to a barbican, and the distinction between the two is frequently unclear. A barbican was a structure erected on the outer side of a gateway to protect it, often a fortified outer ward or u-shaped tower. French historian Jean-Denis G. G. Lepage, writing in 2015 considered that a bastille is merely a larger version of barbican of a scale similar to a castle and often an independent garrison to the main settlement.

While today found in a variety of cities, such as Grenoble and Lübeck, the word bastille is associated above all with the famous bastille in Paris, the Bastille Saint-Antoine, which played a prominent part in the history of France under its monarchy. Bastilles were often forts, but could be more similar to gatehouses in smaller settlements.

Like the word bastide, the word bastille derives from the word bastida in the southern French Occitan language, which can mean a fortification or fortified settlement.
