= Claude Cholat =

French painter

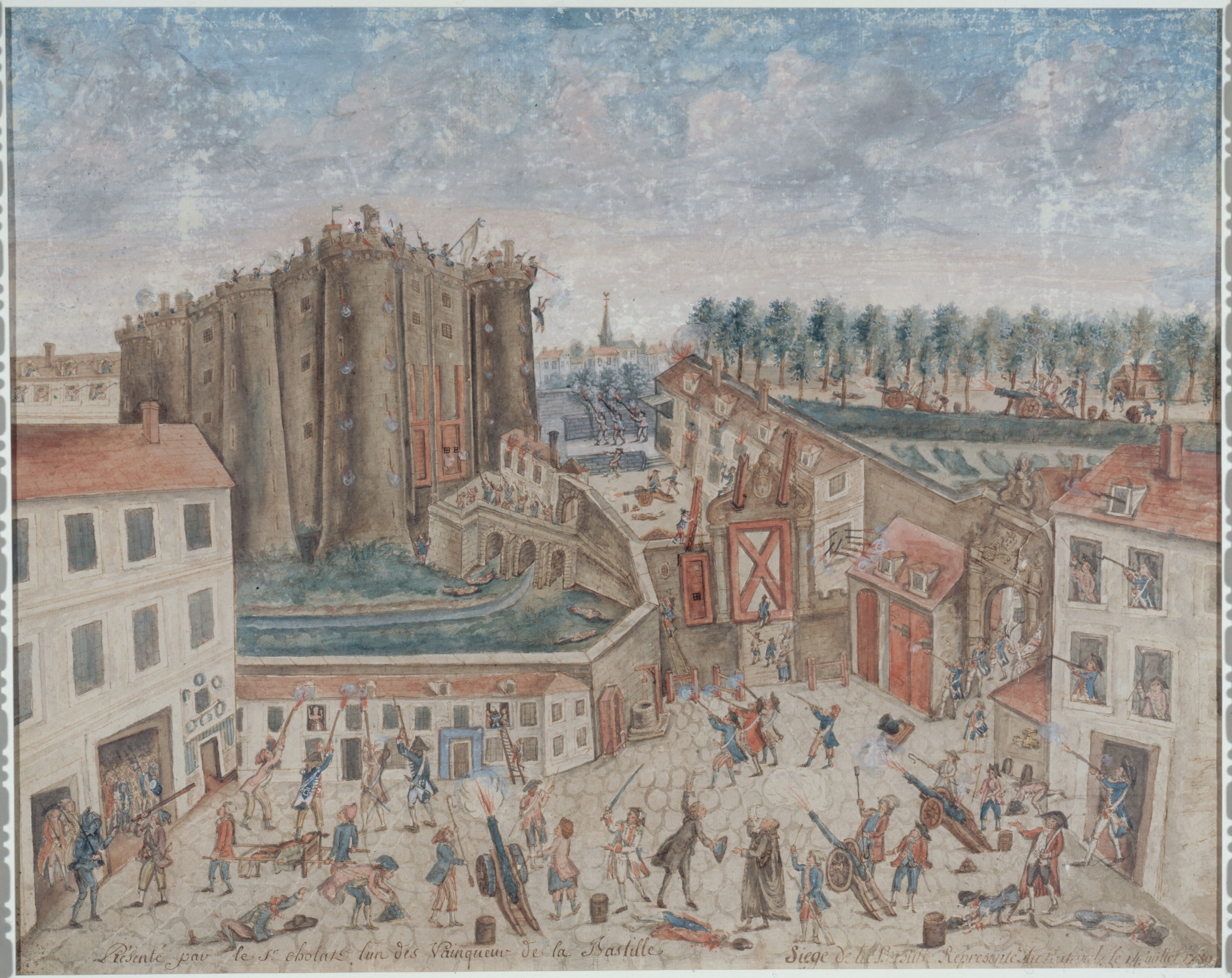
Siege of the Bastille

Claude Cholat was a wine merchant living in Paris on the Rue Noyer at the start of the French Revolution in 1789. He created the painting La Prise de la Bastille (Siege of the Bastille) after the storming of the Bastille in 1789. During the storming, he operated a cannon and fought for the National Guard. Cholat claimed to have personally arrested the Bastille's governor, de Launay, though there is no proof of this.
