= Penka =

Penka may refer to:

- Proenkephalin, or PENKA, endogenous opioid polypeptide hormone
- Karl Penka (1847–1912), Austrian philologist and anthropologist
- Penka Kouneva (born 1967), Bulgarian-American composer
- Penka Metodieva (born 1950), Bulgarian basketball player
- Penka Sokolova (1946–1977), Bulgarian hurdler
- Penka Stoyanova (born 1950), Bulgarian basketball player
- Vela Peeva (1922–1944), Bulgarian communist partisan also known as Penka

== See also ==
- Panka Pelishek (1899–1990), Bulgarian pianist and music teacher
