= Storming of the Bastille =

Major event of the French Revolution

- Part of the French Revolution
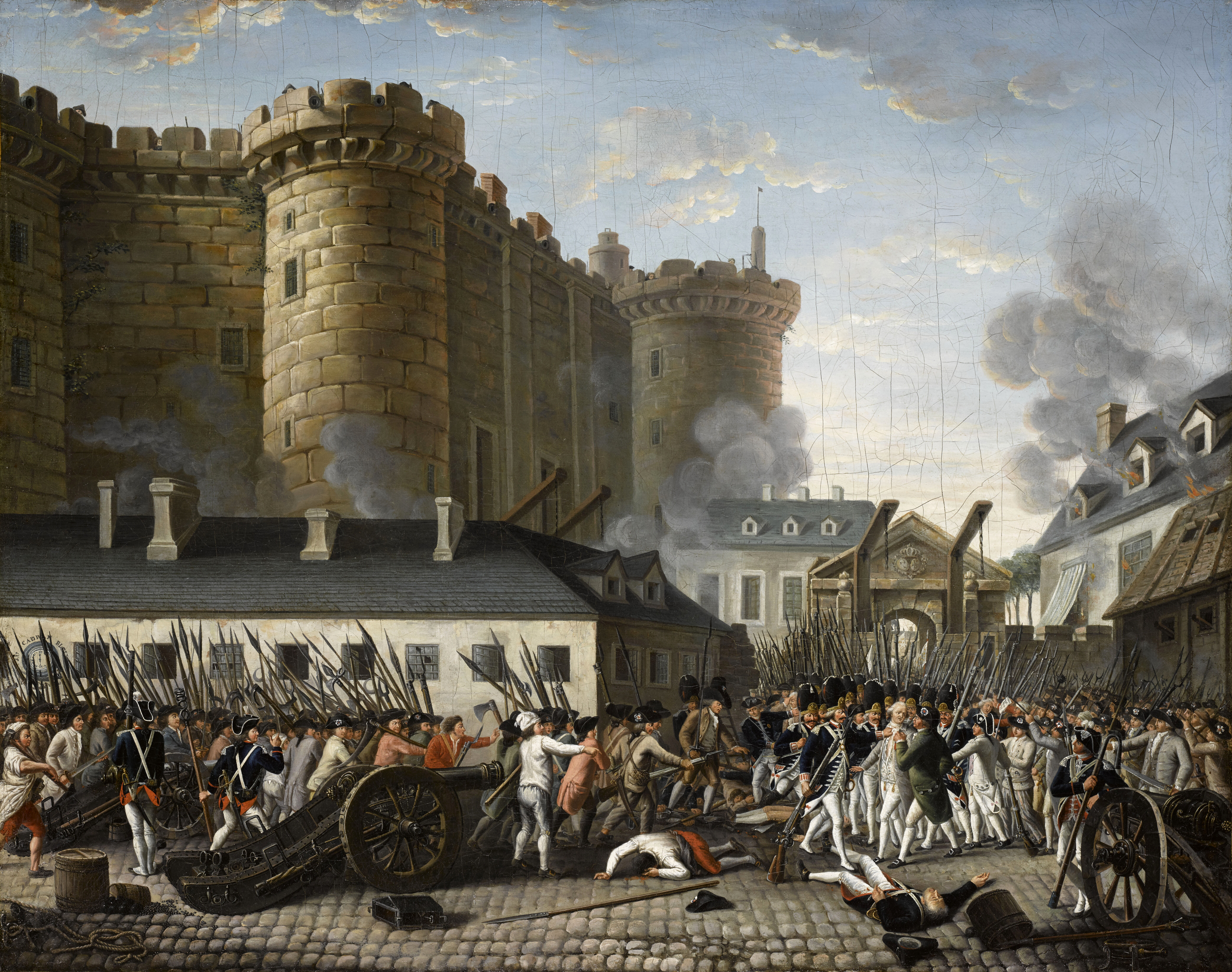
- Contemporary painting of the storming
Date	14 July 1789; 237 years ago
Location	Paris, Kingdom of France 48°51′11″N 2°22′09″E
Result	Insurgent victory: Bastille captured; Prisoners of the Bastille freed; Governor de Launay executed; French Revolution begins

Belligerents
(Paris) Civilian insurgents French Guards mutineers	Royal government

Commanders and leaders
Pierre Hulin; Stanislas Maillard; Jacob Job Élie	Bernard-René Jourdan de Launay (executed)

Strength
688–1,000 insurgents; 61 French Guards; 5+ cannons	114 soldiers: 82 Invalides; 32 Swiss soldiers of the Salis-Samade Regiment; 30 cannons

Casualties and losses
93 killed; 15 died of wounds; 73 wounded	1 killed; 6–8 died after surrender; 105–107 captured
- Location within present-day Paris, France

The Storming of the Bastille (French: Prise de la Bastille [pʁiz də la bastij]), also known as Fall of the Bastille, which occurred in Paris, France, on 14 July 1789, was an act of political violence by revolutionary insurgents who attempted to storm and seize control of the medieval armoury, fortress, and political prison known as the Bastille. After four hours of fighting and 94 deaths, the insurgents were able to enter the Bastille. The governor of the Bastille, Bernard-René Jourdan de Launay, and several members of the Garrison were killed after surrendering. At the time, the Bastille represented royal authority in the centre of Paris. The prison contained only seven inmates at the time of its storming and was already scheduled for demolition but was seen by the revolutionaries as a symbol of the monarchy's abuse of power. Its fall was the flashpoint of the French Revolution.

In France, 14 July is a national holiday called Fête nationale française which commemorates both the anniversary of the storming of the Bastille and the Fête de la Fédération which occurred on its first anniversary in 1790. In English this holiday is commonly referred to as Bastille Day.

== Background ==
During the reign of Louis XVI, France faced a major economic crisis caused in part by the cost of intervening in the American Revolution and exacerbated by regressive taxes as well as poor harvests in the late 1780s. Furthermore, Finance Minister Calonne, Louis XVI's replacement for Jacques Necker, thought that lavish spending would secure loans by presenting the monarchy as wealthy. This only added to Louis' financial woes. On 5 May 1789, the Estates General convened to deal with the issue but were held back by archaic protocols and the conservatism of the Second Estate, representing the nobility, which made up less than 2% of France's population.

On 17 June the Third Estate, with its representatives drawn from the commoners, reconstituted itself as the National Assembly, a body whose purpose was the creation of a French constitution. The king initially opposed that development but was forced to acknowledge the authority of the assembly, which renamed itself the National Constituent Assembly on 9 July.

Paris, close to insurrection and, in François Mignet's words, "intoxicated with liberty and enthusiasm", showed wide support for the Assembly. The press published the debates, and political debate spread beyond the Assembly itself into the public squares and halls of the capital. The Palais-Royal and its grounds became the site of an ongoing meeting.

The crowd, on the authority of the meeting at the Palais-Royal, broke open the Prisons of the Abbaye to release some 14 grenadiers of the French Guards who had been reportedly imprisoned for refusing to fire on the people. The Assembly reached an agreement with the King in which the freed guardsmen returned to prison for a token one-day period and had their names struck from the army registry. The rank and file of the regiment, which had been considered reliable, now leaned toward the popular cause.

=== Necker's dismissal ===
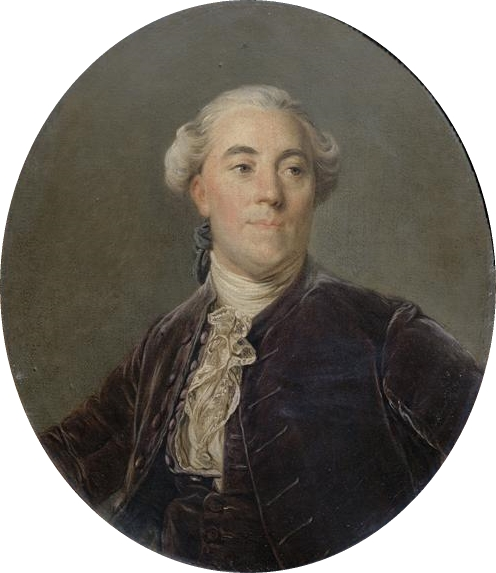
Portrait of Jacques Necker by Joseph Duplessis

On 11 July 1789, Louis XVI, acting under the influence of the conservative nobles of his privy council, dismissed and banished Necker (who had been sympathetic to the Third Estate) and completely reconstituted the ministry. The marshals Victor-François, duc de Broglie, La Galissonnière, the duc de la Vauguyon, the Baron Louis de Breteuil, and the intendant Joseph Foullon de Doué, took over the posts of Puységur, Armand Marc, comte de Montmorin, La Luzerne, Saint-Priest, and Necker.

News of Necker's dismissal reached Paris on the afternoon of 12 July. The Parisians generally presumed that the dismissal marked the start of a coup by conservative elements. Liberal Parisians were further enraged by the fear that a concentration of Royal troops, brought in from frontier garrisons to Versailles, Sèvres, the Champ de Mars and Saint-Denis, would attempt to shut down the National Constituent Assembly, which was meeting in Versailles. Crowds gathered throughout Paris, including more than 10,000 at the Palais-Royal. Camille Desmoulins successfully rallied the crowd by "mounting a table, pistol in hand, exclaiming: 'Citizens, there is no time to lose; the dismissal of Necker is the knell of Saint Bartholomew for patriots! This very night all the Swiss and German battalions will leave the Champ de Mars to massacre us all; one resource is left; to take arms!'"

The Swiss and German battalions referred to were among the foreign mercenary troops who made up a significant portion of the pre-revolutionary Royal Army and were seen as being less likely to be sympathetic to the popular cause than ordinary French soldiers. By early July, approximately half of the 25,000 regular troops in Paris and Versailles were drawn from those foreign regiments. The French regiments included in the concentration appear to have been selected either because of the proximity of their garrisons to Paris or because their colonels were supporters of the reactionary "court party" opposed to reform.

During the public demonstrations that started on 12 July, the multitude displayed busts of Necker and of Louis Philippe II, Duke of Orléans and marched from the Palais Royal through the theatre district before it continued westward along the boulevards. The crowd clashed with the Royal German Cavalry Regiment ("Royal-Allemand") between the Place Vendôme and the Tuileries Palace. From atop the Champs-Élysées, Charles Eugene, Prince of Lambesc (Marshal of the Camp, Proprietor of the Royal Allemand-Dragoons) unleashed a cavalry charge that dispersed the remaining protesters at Place Louis XV—now Place de la Concorde. The Royal commander, Baron de Besenval, fearing the results of a blood bath amongst the poorly-armed crowds or defections among his own men, then withdrew the cavalry towards Sèvres.

Meanwhile, unrest was growing among the people of Paris who expressed their hostility against state authorities by attacking customs posts blamed for causing increased food and wine prices. The people of Paris started to plunder any place where food, guns, and supplies might be hoarded. That night, rumours spread that supplies were hoarded at Saint-Lazare, a huge property of the clergy, which functioned as a convent, hospital, school, and even a jail. An angry mob broke in and plundered the property, seizing 52 wagons of wheat, which were taken to the public market. The same day, multitudes of people plundered many other places including weapon arsenals. Royal troops did nothing to stop the spreading of social chaos in Paris.

=== Armed conflict ===
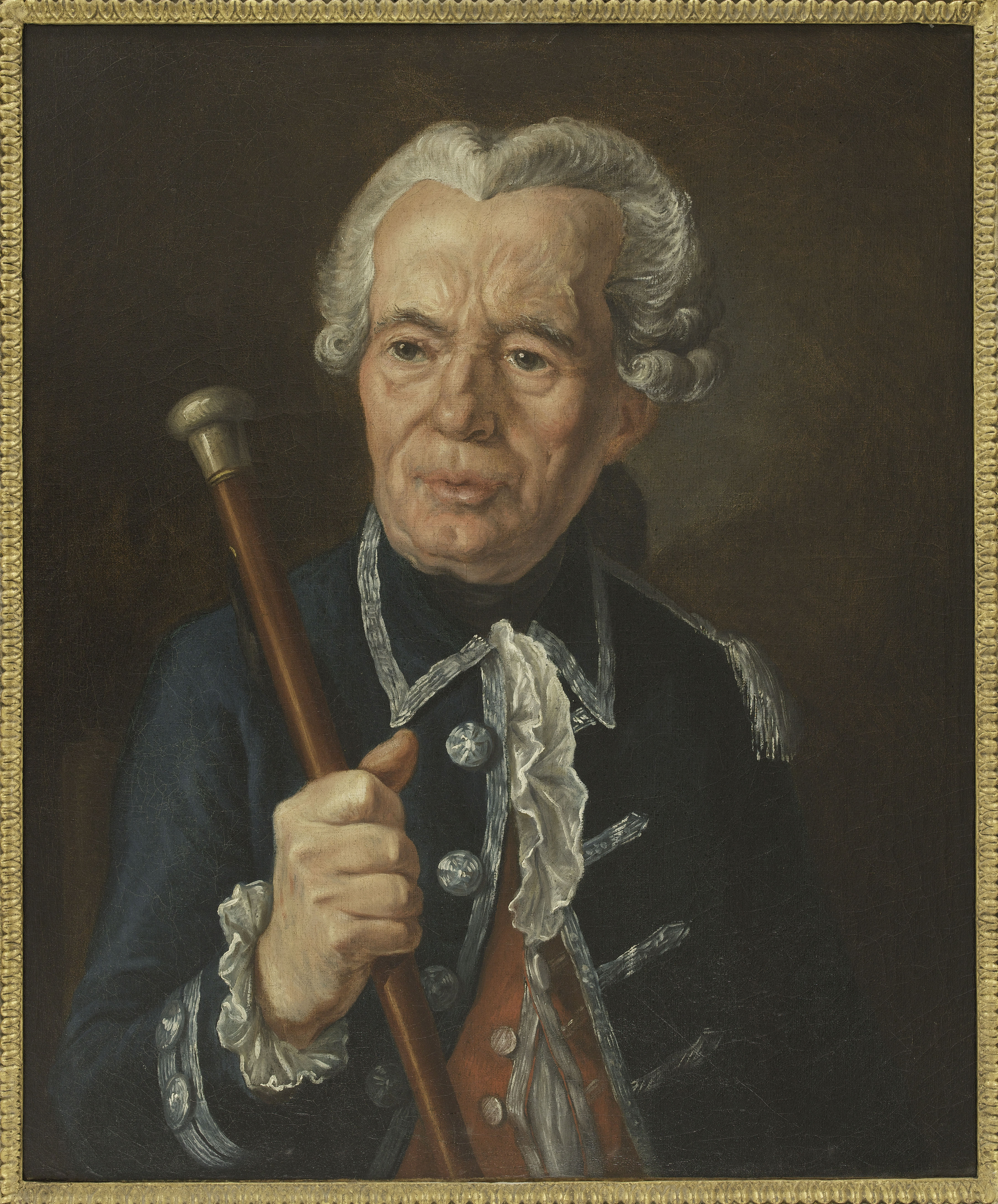
Portrait of the Marquis de Launay, the Governor of the Bastille during the storm

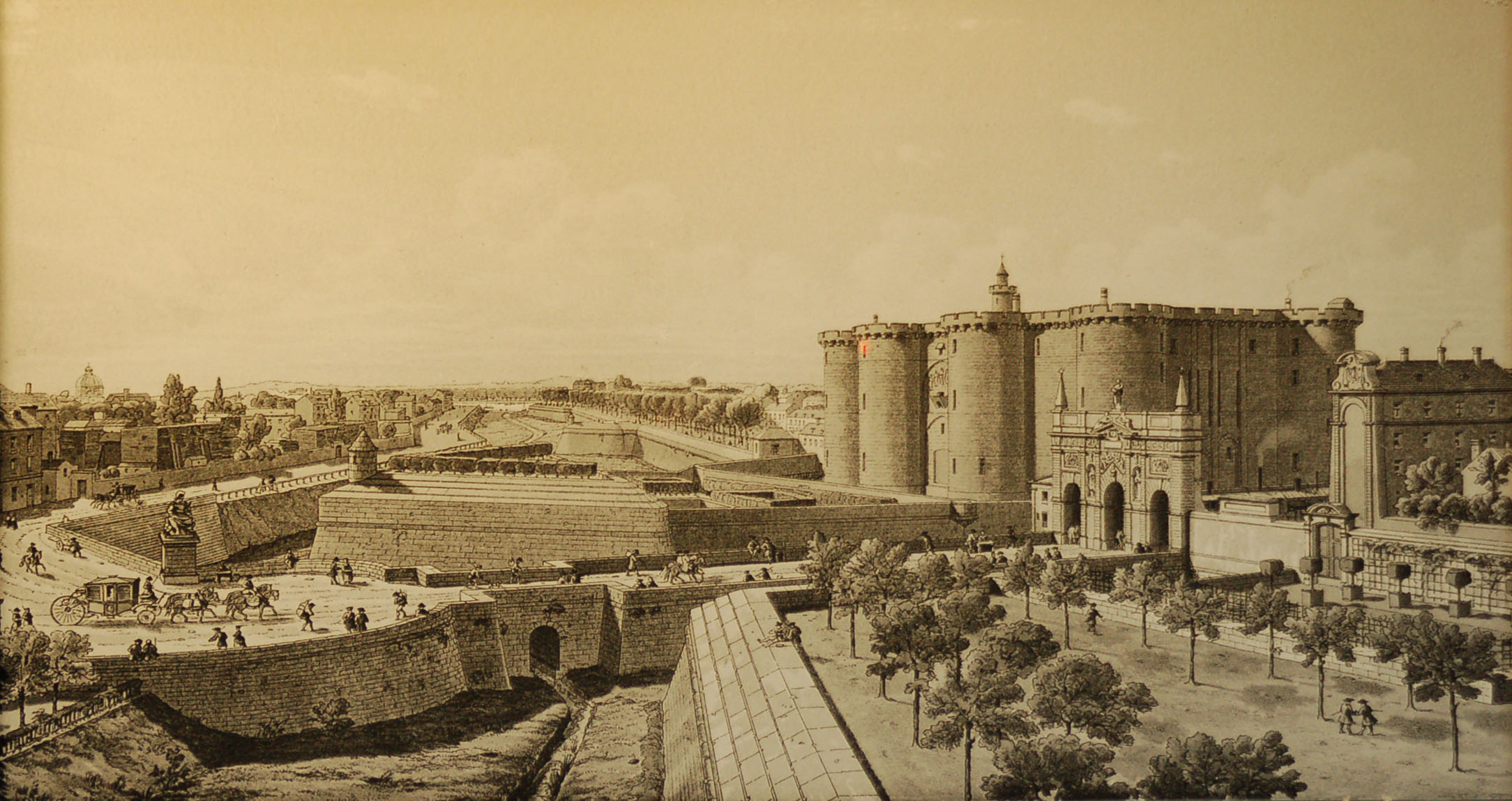
The Bastille of Paris before the Revolution

The regiment of Gardes Françaises (French Guards) formed the permanent garrison of Paris and, with many local ties, was favourably disposed towards the popular cause. The regiment had remained confined to its barracks during the initial stages of the mid-July disturbances. With Paris becoming the scene of a general riot, Charles Eugene, not trusting the regiment to obey his order, posted sixty dragoons to station themselves before its depot in the Chaussée d'Antin. The officers of the French Guards made ineffectual attempts to rally their men. The rebellious citizenry had now acquired a trained military contingent. As word of this spread, the commanders of the royal forces encamped on the Champ de Mars became doubtful of the dependability of even the foreign regiments.

The future "Citizen King", Louis-Philippe, Duke of Orléans, witnessed those events as a young officer and was of the opinion that the soldiers would have obeyed orders if put to the test. He also commented in retrospect that the officers of the French Guards had neglected their responsibilities in the period before the uprising and left the regiment too much to the control of its non-commissioned officers. However, the uncertain leadership of Besenval led to a virtual abdication of royal authority in central Paris.

On the morning of 13 July, the electors of Paris met and agreed to the recruitment of a "bourgeois militia" of 48,000 men from the 60 voting districts of Paris to restore order. Their identifying cockades were of blue and red, the colours of Paris. Marquis de Lafayette was elected commander of that group on 14 July and subsequently changed its name to the National Guard. He added the colour white to the cockade on 27 July, to make the famous French tricolour. White was the historic colour of the Bourbon monarchy and Lafayette's decision to retain it in the new symbol of national identity illustrates his intention to achieve a constitutional monarchy rather than moving to a revolutionary republic.

== Attack ==
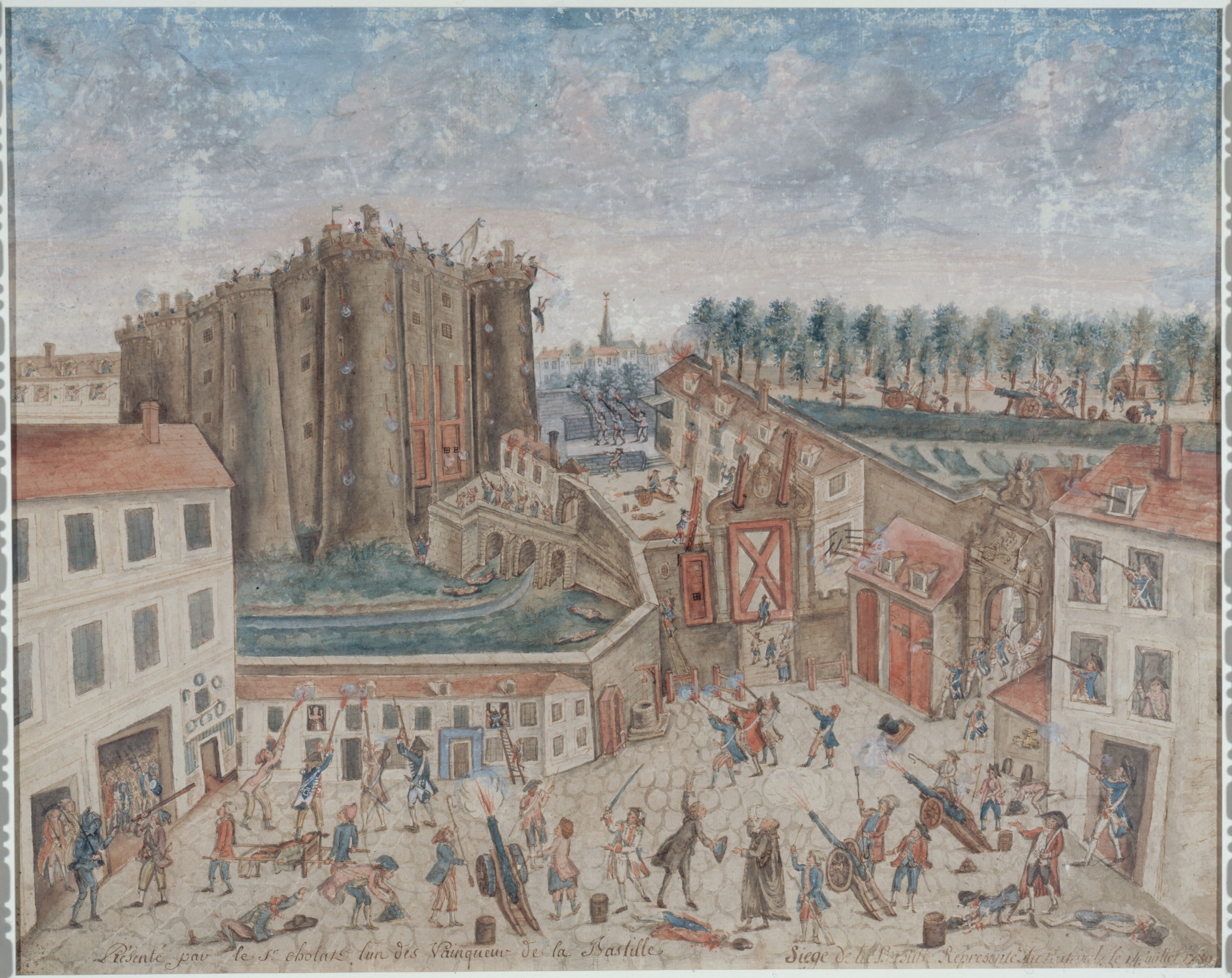
An eyewitness painting of the siege of the Bastille by Claude Cholat

On the morning of 13 July, Paris was in a state of alarm. The partisans of the Third Estate in France, now under the control of the Bourgeois Militia of Paris (soon to become Revolutionary France's National Guard), had earlier stormed the Hôtel des Invalides without meeting significant opposition. Their intention had been to gather the weapons held there (29,000 to 32,000 muskets, but without powder or shot). The commandant at the Invalides had in the previous few days taken the precaution of transferring 250 barrels of gunpowder to the Bastille for safer storage.

At this point, the Bastille was nearly empty, housing only seven prisoners: four forgers arrested under warrants issued by the Grand Châtelet court; James F.X. Whyte, an Irish born "lunatic" suspected of spying and imprisoned at the request of his family; Auguste-Claude Tavernier, who had tried to assassinate Louis XV 30 years before; and one "deviant" aristocrat suspected of murder, the Comte de Solages, imprisoned by his father using a lettre de cachet. A previous prisoner the Marquis de Sade had been transferred out ten days earlier, after shouting to passers-by that the prisoners were being massacred. The high cost of maintaining a garrisoned medieval fortress, for what was seen as having a limited purpose, had led to a decision being made shortly before the disturbances began to replace it with an open public space. Amid the tensions of July 1789, the building remained as a symbol of royal tyranny.

An analysis in 2013 of the Bastille's dimensions showed that it did not tower over the neighbourhood as depicted in some paintings, but was a comparable height to other buildings in the neighbourhood. The regular garrison consisted of 82 invalides (veteran soldiers no longer suitable for service in the field). It had however been reinforced on 7 July by 32 grenadiers of the Swiss Salis-Samade Regiment from the regular troops on the Champ de Mars. The walls mounted 18 eight-pound guns and 12 smaller pieces. The Bastille's governor was Bernard-René de Launay, son of a previous governor and actually born within the Bastille.

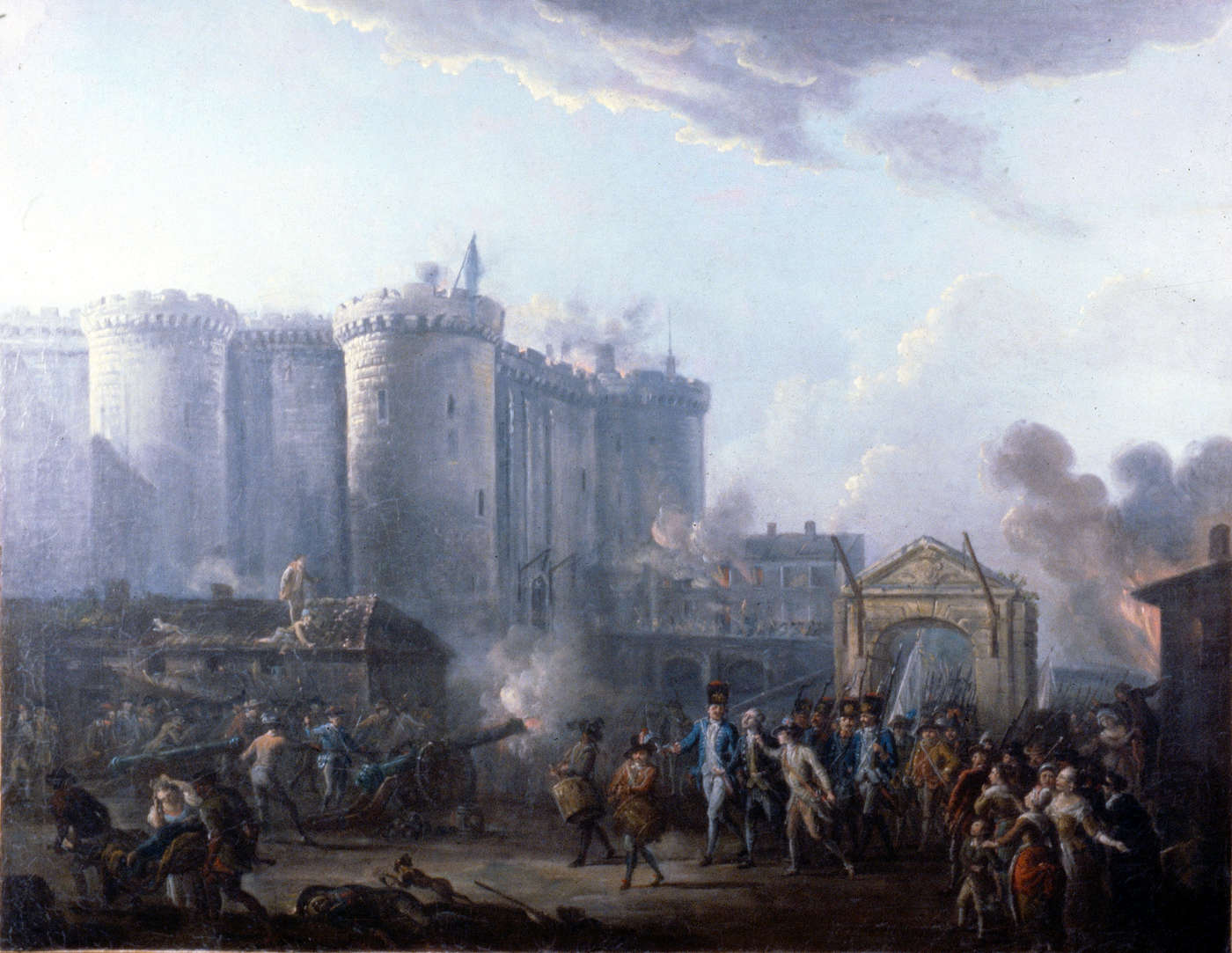
Arrest of Launay, by Jean-Baptiste Lallemand, 1790, (Musée de la Révolution française

The official list of vainqueurs de la Bastille (conquerors of the Bastille) subsequently compiled has 954 names, and the total of the crowd was probably fewer than one thousand. A breakdown of occupations included in the list indicates that the majority were local artisans, together with some regular army deserters and a few distinctive categories, such as 21 wine merchants.

The crowd gathered outside the fortress around mid-morning, calling for the pulling back of the seemingly threatening cannon from the embrasures of the towers and walls and the release of the arms and gunpowder stored inside. Two representatives from the Hotel de Ville (municipal authorities from the Town Hall) were invited into the fortress and negotiations began, while another was admitted around noon with definite demands. The negotiations dragged on while the crowd grew and became impatient. Around 1:30 pm, the crowd surged into the undefended outer courtyard. A small party climbed onto the roof of a building next to the gate to the inner courtyard of the fortress and broke the chains on the drawbridge, crushing one vainqueur as it fell. Soldiers of the garrison called to the people to withdraw, but amid the noise and confusion these shouts were misinterpreted as encouragement to enter. Gunfire began, apparently spontaneously, turning the crowd into a mob. The crowd seems to have felt that they had been intentionally drawn into a trap and the fighting became more violent and intense, while attempts by deputies to organise a cease-fire were ignored by the attackers.

The firing continued, and after 3:00 pm, the attackers were reinforced by mutinous gardes françaises, along with two cannons, each of which was reportedly fired about six times. Several farm wagons were filled with damp straw, which was set alight to provide cover for the besiegers. The clouds of smoke however proved a distraction for both sides and the wagons were hauled away. A substantial force of Royal Army troops encamped on the Champ de Mars did not intervene.

With the possibility of mutual carnage becoming apparent, de Launay ordered the garrison to cease firing at 5:00 pm. A letter written by de Launay offering surrender but threatening to explode the powder stocks held if the garrison were not permitted to evacuate the fortress unharmed, was handed out to the besiegers through a gap in the inner gate. His demands were not met, but de Launay nonetheless capitulated as he realised that with limited food stocks and no water supply his troops could not hold out much longer. He accordingly opened the gates, and the vainqueurs swept in to take over the fortress at 5:30 pm.

Ninety-eight attackers and one defender had died in the actual fighting or subsequently from wounds, a disparity accounted for by the protection provided to the garrison by the fortress walls. De Launay was seized and dragged towards the Hôtel de Ville in a storm of abuse. Outside the Hôtel, a discussion as to his fate began. The badly beaten de Launay shouted "Enough! Let me die!" and kicked a pastry cook named Dulait in the groin. De Launay was then stabbed repeatedly and died. An English traveller, Doctor Edward Rigby, reported what he saw, "[We] perceived two bloody heads raised on pikes, which were said to be the heads of the Marquis de Launay, Governor of the Bastille, and of Monsieur Flesselles, Prévôt des Marchands. It was a chilling and a horrid sight! ... Shocked and disgusted at this scene, [we] retired immediately from the streets." The three officers of the permanent Bastille garrison were also killed by the crowd; Surviving police reports detail their wounds and clothing.

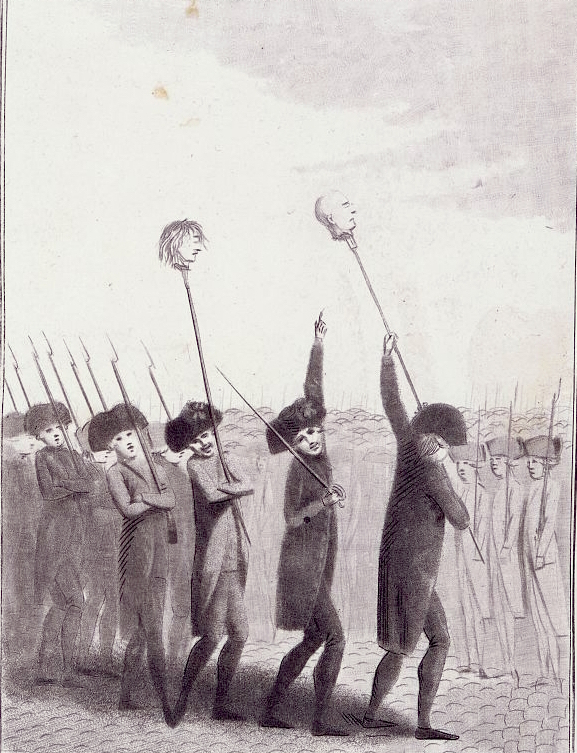
Engraving, c. 1789: militia hoisting the heads of Flesselles and the Marquis de Launay on pikes. The caption reads "Thus we take revenge on traitors".

Three of the invalides of the garrison were lynched, plus possibly two of the Swiss regulars of the Salis-Samade Regiment who were reported missing. The remaining Swiss were protected by the French Guards and eventually released to return to their regiment. Their officer Lieutenant Ludwig von Flüe wrote a detailed report on the defense of the Bastille, which was incorporated in the logbook of the Salis-Samade Regiment and has survived. It is critical of de Launay, whom Ludwig von Flüe accuses of weak and indecisive leadership. The blame for the fall of the Bastille would rather appear to lie with the inertia of the commanders of the 5,000 Royal Army troops encamped on the Champ de Mars, who did not act when either the nearby Hôtel des Invalides or the Bastille was attacked. A brief order sent from the Baron de Besenval to the governor read only "M. de Launay is to hold firm to the end; I have sent him sufficient forces".

Returning to the Hôtel de Ville, the mob accused the prévôt dès marchands (roughly, mayor) Jacques de Flesselles of treachery, and he was assassinated on the way to an ostensible trial at the Palais-Royal. King Louis XVI first learned of the storming the next morning through the Duke of La Rochefoucauld. "Is it a revolt?" asked Louis. The duke replied: "No sire, it's not a revolt; it's a revolution." Indeed, the storming of the Bastille is suggested to be the founding point of the French Revolution in national discourse. In his book The French Revolution: From Enlightenment to Tyranny, however, historian Ian Davidson argues that Louis XVI capitulating to the Third Estate at Versailles has a better claim to being the founding event, noting that the "bourgeois Revolutionaries" of Versailles had a major role in steering the future of the revolution, using parliamentary and political mechanisms, for the next three years. Nonetheless, the fall of the Bastille marks the first time the regular citizens of Paris, the sans-culottes, made a major intervention into the Revolution's affairs. For this stage of the Revolution, the sans-culottes were allies to the "bourgeois Revolutionaries".

== 14 to 15 July – immediate reaction ==
At Versailles, the Assembly were for a few hours ignorant of most of the Paris events. The representatives remained however concerned that the Marshal de Broglie might still unleash a pro-Royalist coup to force them to adopt the order of 23 June and then dissolve the Assembly. Louis Marie de Noailles apparently was first to bring reasonably accurate news of the Paris events to Versailles. Charles Ganilh and Bancal-des-Issarts had been dispatched to the Hôtel de Ville and confirmed de Noailles' report.

By the morning of 15 July, the outcome appeared clear to the king as well, and he and his military commanders backed down. The 23 regiments of Royal troops concentrated around Paris were dispersed to their frontier garrisons. The Marquis de la Fayette took up command of the National Guard at Paris; Jean Sylvain Bailly—leader of the Third Estate and instigator of the Tennis Court Oath—became the city's mayor under a new governmental structure known as the Commune de Paris. The king announced that he would recall Necker and return from Versailles to Paris; on 17 July, in Paris, he accepted a blue-and-red cockade from Bailly and entered the Hôtel de Ville to cries of "Long live the King" and "Long live the Nation".

== Aftermath ==
=== Political ===
Immediately after the violence of 14 July members of the nobility—little assured by the apparent and, as it was to prove, temporary reconciliation of king and people—started to flee the country as émigrés. Among the first to leave were the Count of Artois (the future Charles X of France) and his two sons, the Prince of Condé, the Prince of Conti, the Polignac family, and (slightly later) Charles Alexandre de Calonne, the former finance minister. They settled at Turin, where Calonne (as agent for the Count of Artois and the Prince of Condé) began plotting civil war within the kingdom and agitating for a European coalition against France.

The news of the successful insurrection in Paris spread throughout France. In accord with principles of popular sovereignty and with complete disregard for claims of royal authority, the people established parallel structures of municipalities for civic government and militias for civic protection. In rural areas, many went beyond this: some burned title-deeds and no small number of châteaux, as the "Great Fear" spread across the countryside during the weeks of 20 July to 5 August, with attacks on wealthy landlords impelled by the belief that the aristocracy was trying to put down the revolution.

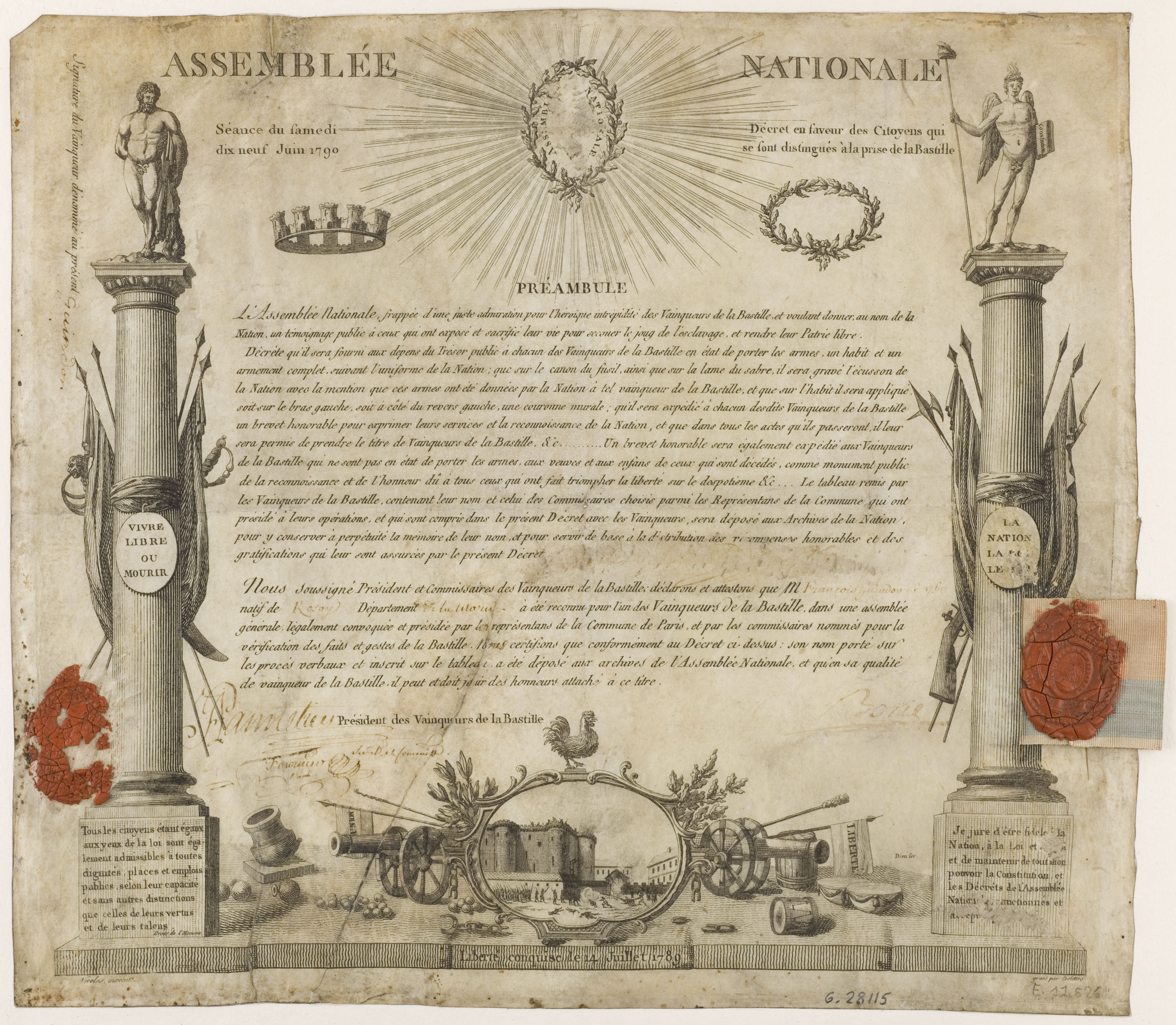
A Brevet de vainqueur de la Bastille certificate given to citizen François Gaindon, a participant of the Storming of the Bastille by the National Assembly

On 16 July, two days after the storming of the Bastille, John Frederick Sackville, British ambassador to France, reported to Secretary of State for Foreign Affairs Francis Osborne, 5th Duke of Leeds, "Thus, my Lord, the greatest revolution that we know anything of has been effected with, comparatively speaking—if the magnitude of the event is considered—the loss of very few lives. From this moment we may consider France as a free country, the King a very limited monarch, and the nobility as reduced to a level with the rest of the nation."

On 22 July the populace lynched Controller-General of Finances Joseph Foullon de Doué and his son-in-law Louis Bénigne François Bertier de Sauvigny. Both had held official positions under the monarchy. About 900 people who claimed to have stormed the Bastille received certificates (Brevet de vainqueur de la Bastille) from the National Assembly in 1790, and some of these still exist.

=== Political propaganda ===
The storming of the Bastille has been portrayed as a defining revolutionary act symbolizing the overthrow of tyranny. In reality, the prison held only seven inmates at the time, and by 1789 it had little military significance.

The Bastille's role as a state prison had diminished by the late 18th century. Under Louis XVI, it housed a small number of prisoners, including common criminals and individuals detained by royal authority. The day of the storming, the prison contained only seven inmates: four forgers, two mentally ill men, and a count imprisoned at his family's request. Nonetheless, the event became a powerful symbol of the French Revolution.

Revolutionaries used the storming of the Bastille as propaganda to rally public support against the monarchy. They portrayed the fortress as a symbol of arbitrary royal power and oppression, emphasizing its supposed horrors. Pamphlets, newspapers, and political cartoons depicted the Bastille as a site of tyranny, turning its fall into a narrative of popular triumph and inspiring widespread revolutionary fervor.

=== Demolition of Bastille ===
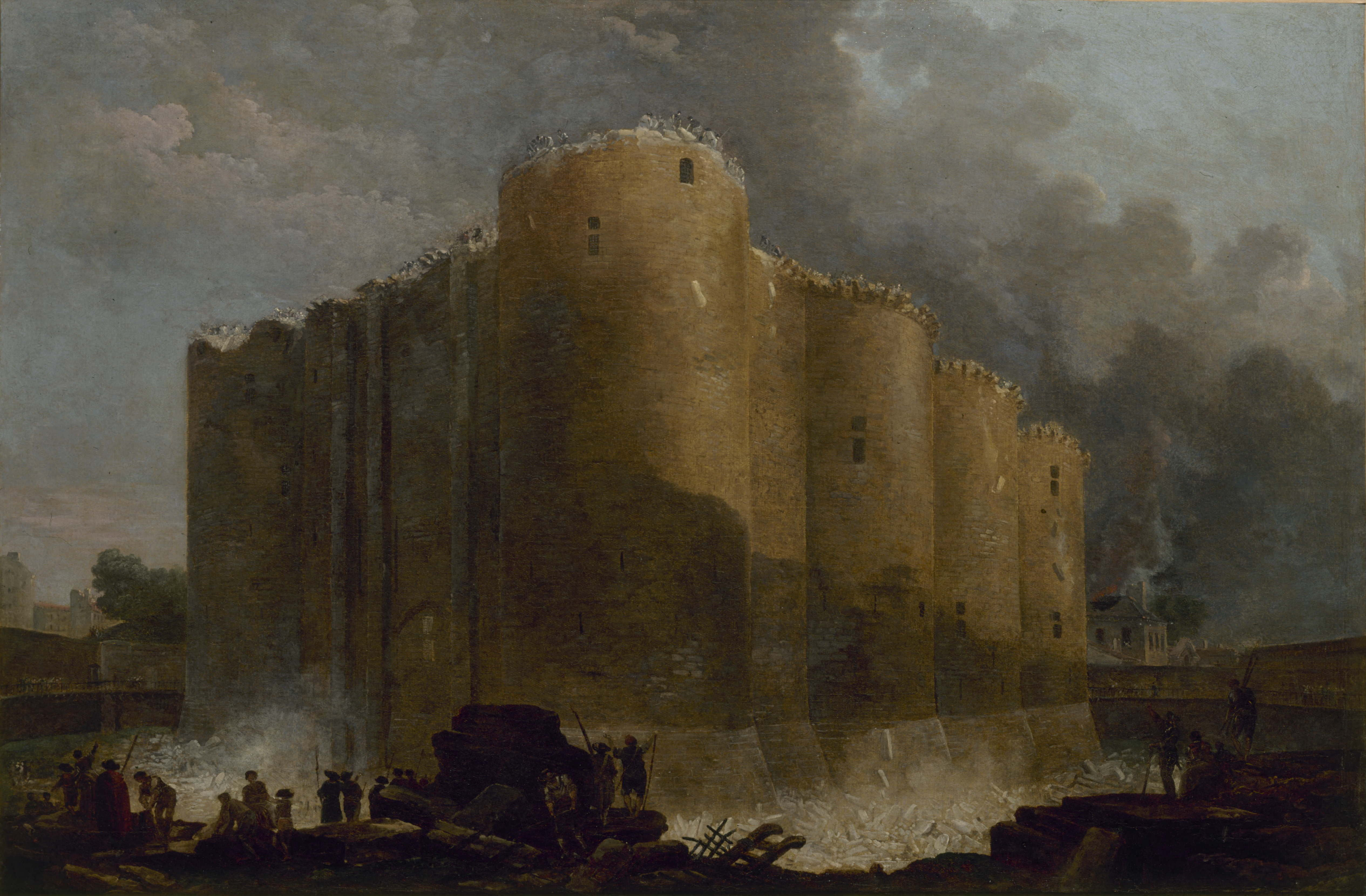
The Bastille During the First Days of its Demolition by Hubert Robert, 1789

Although there were arguments that the Bastille should be preserved as a monument to liberation or as a depot for the new National Guard, the Permanent Committee of Municipal Electors at the Paris Town Hall gave the construction entrepreneur Pierre-François Palloy the commission of disassembling the building. Palloy commenced work immediately, employing about 1,000 workers. The demolition of the fortress, the melting down of its clock portraying chained prisoners, and the breaking up of four statues were all carried out within five months.

In 1790, Lafayette gave the key to the Bastille—weighing one pound three ounces—to U.S. President George Washington. Washington displayed it prominently at government facilities and events in New York and in Philadelphia until shortly before his retirement in 1797. The key remains on display at Washington's residence of Mount Vernon.

Palloy took bricks from the Bastille and had them carved into replicas of the fortress, which he sold, along with medals allegedly made from the chains of prisoners. Pieces of stone from the structure were sent to every district in France, and some have been located. Various other pieces of the Bastille also survive, including stones used to build the Pont de la Concorde bridge over the Seine, and one of the towers, which was found buried in 1899 and is now at Square Henri-Galli in Paris, as well as the clock bells and pulley system, which are now in the Musée d’Art Campanaire. The building itself is outlined in brick on the location where it once stood, as is the moat in the Paris Metro stop below it, where a piece of the foundation is also on display.

== In popular media ==
A Tale of Two Cities, the 1859 novel by Charles Dickens, dramatizes the Bastille storming in "Book The Second – the Golden Thread," Chapter 21, "Echoing Footsteps" ("Seven prisoners released, seven gory heads on pikes, the keys of the accursed fortress of the eight strong towers, some discovered letters and other memorials of prisoners of old time, long dead of broken hearts, – such, and such – like, the loudly echoing footsteps of Saint Antoine escort through the Paris streets in mid-July, one thousand seven hunderd and eighty-nine.")

La Révolution française, a 1989 French film dramatizes the storming in Part I. One Nation, One King, a 2018 French film dramatizes the storming.
