= Head on a spike =

Severed head on a pole

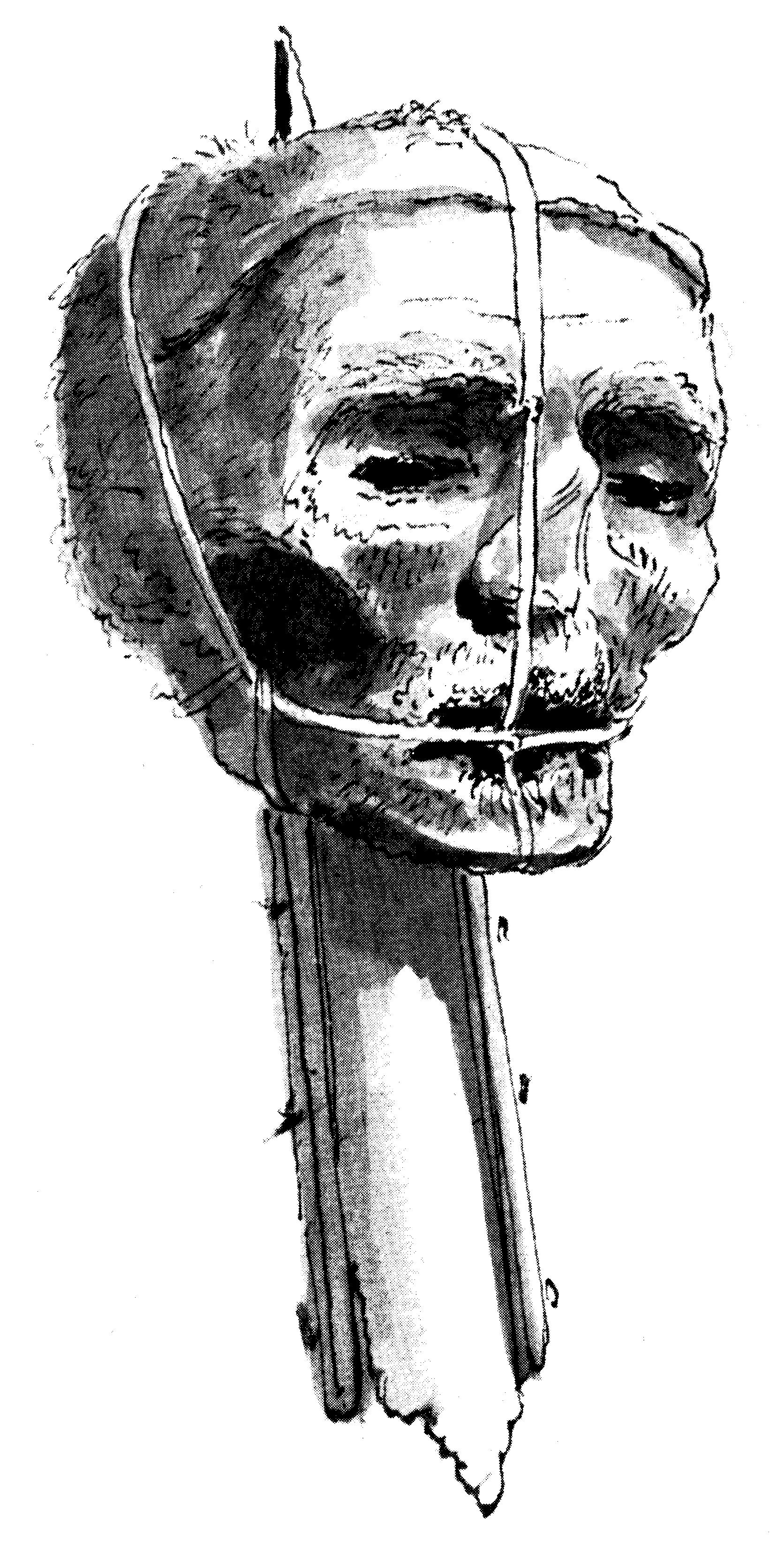
Oliver Cromwell's head was placed on a spike and erected in the 17th century. A drawing from the late 18th century.

A head on a spike (also described as a head on a pike, a head on a stake, or a head on a spear) is a severed head that has been vertically impaled for display. This has been a custom in a number of cultures, typically either as part of a criminal penalty following execution or as a war trophy following a violent conflict. The symbolic value may change over time. It may give a warning to spectators. The head may be a human head or an animal head.

== History ==
The earliest known archeological evidence for mounting heads on stakes has been identified in Sweden, at a Mesolithic site in Kanaljorden, in the floor of a dried lake, dating to 8,000 years ago. There, archeologists recovered human crania with the remnants of wooden stakes still in place within the two crania. The crania exhibited evidence of blunt force trauma that looked to have resulted from a violent confrontation. Archeologists interpreted the wooden stakes as evidence that the heads had been mounted for display by members of the Swedish Mesolithic hunter-gatherer culture.

In England, the heads of criminals, especially those convicted of treason, were mounted for display on London Bridge from about 1300 until about 1660. Heads were usually dipped in tar to slow down the decomposition process. Criminal punishment was sometimes posthumous, as the body of Oliver Cromwell was exhumed so that it could be hanged, drawn, and quartered, and his head was mounted on a spike and displayed for 30 years.

== Notable examples ==
- Oswald of Northumbria (c. 604–642)
- William Wallace (c. 1270–1305)
- Simon Fraser (d. 1306)
- Jack Cade (c. 1420–1450)
- Richard of York (1411–1460)
- Edmund, Earl of Rutland (1443–1460)
- Elizabeth Barton (1506–1534)
- John Fisher (1469–1535)
- Thomas More (1478–1535)
- Thomas Cromwell (c. 1485–1540)
- Richard Gwyn (c. 1537–1584)
- Muiris Mac Ionrachtaigh (d. 1585)
- Fiach McHugh O'Byrne (1534–1597)
- Guy Fawkes (1570–1606)
- Feidhlimidh Riabhach Mac Dhaibheid (d. 1608)
- Cathaoir Ó Dochartaigh (1587–1608)
- Terence O'Brien (1600-1651)
- Oliver Cromwell (1599–1658)
- Redmond O'Hanlon (c. 1640–1681)
- Blackbeard (c. 1680–1718)
- Éamonn an Chnoic (died c. 1724)
- Jacques de Flesselles (1730–1789)
- Bernard-René Jourdan de Launay (1740–1789)
- Madame de Lamballe (1749–1792)
- Staker Wallace (1733–1798)
- John Murphy (1753–1798)
- Vela Peeva (1922–1944)

== Gallery ==
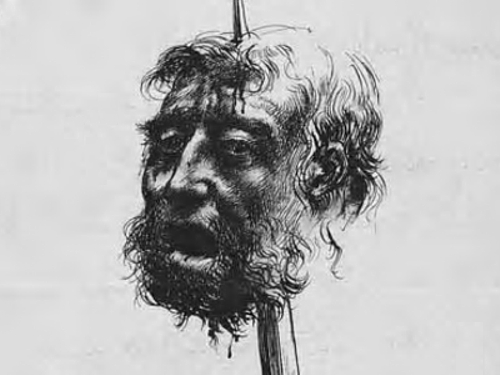
A sketch of a head impaled on a pike, included in a letter to Ronald Fuller dated 1924

Drawing of the French Revolution: "Aristocratic Heads on Pikes"

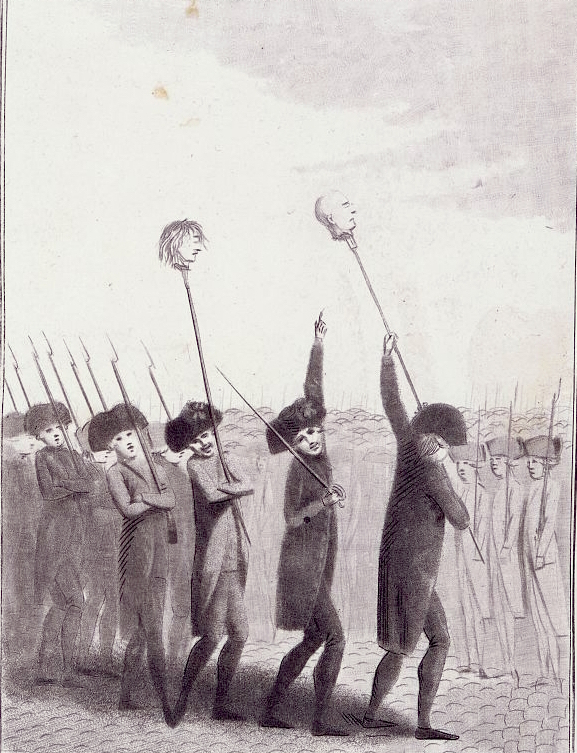
Engraving c. 1789 of French militia hoisting the heads of Jacques de Flesselles and the Marquis de Launay on pikes

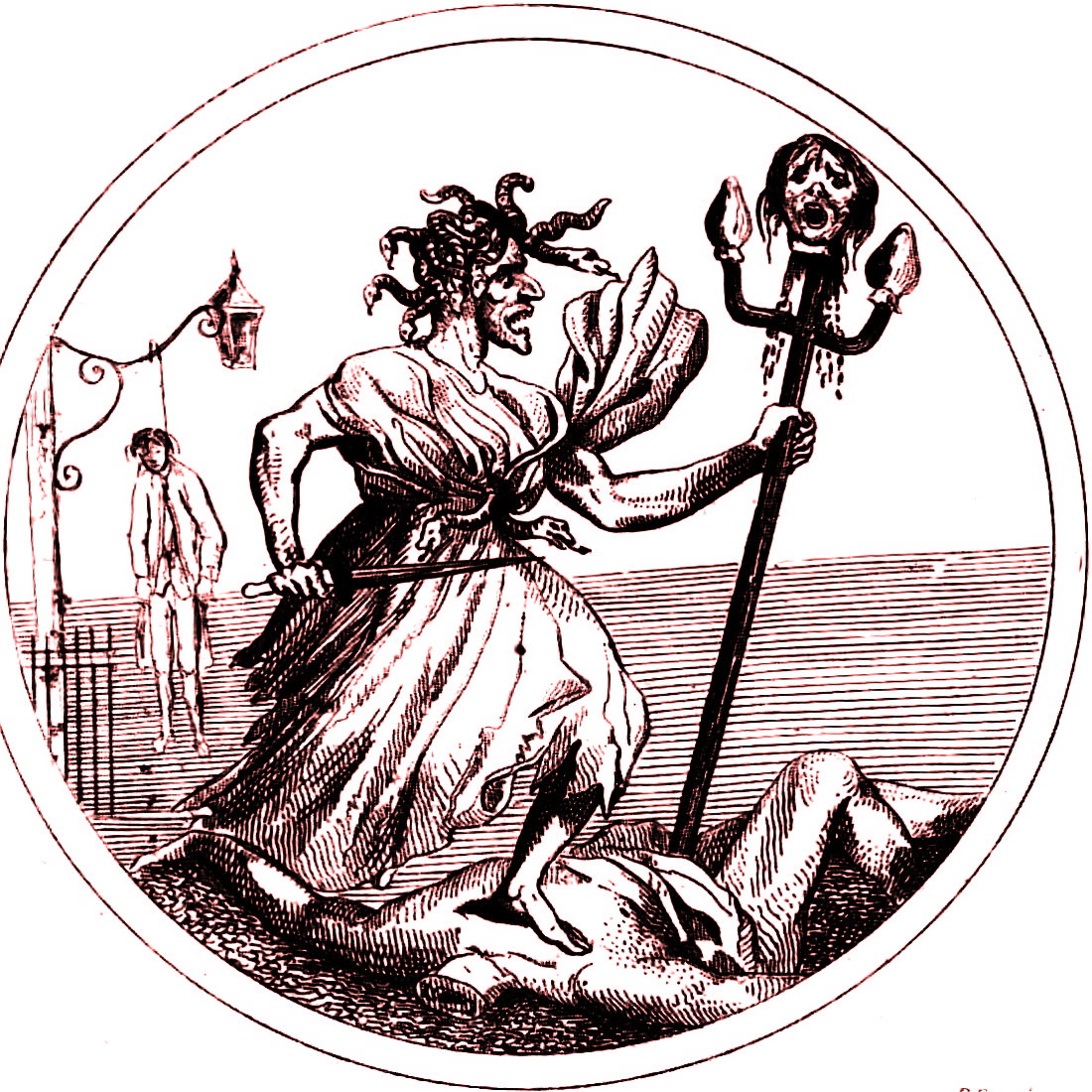
Historical caricature on the Reign of Terror

== See also ==
- Battlefield cross, a symbolic replacement of a cross made up of the soldier's rifle stuck into the ground with helmet on top
- Decapitation
- Headhunting
- Impalement, in which the object is alive at the time of penetration
- London Bridge
- Mounting points and synonyms:
  - spike, stake, pike, polearm, pale, picket

== Bibliography ==
- Gummeson, Sara; Hallgren, Fredrik; Kjellstrom, Anna (2018). "Keep Your Head High: Skulls on stakes and cranial trauma in Mesolithic Sweden". Antiquity. 92 (361): 74–90. doi:10.15184/aqy.2017.210. S2CID 165241018.
- Fitzgibbons, Jonathan (2008). Cromwell's Head. Kew: The National Archives. ISBN 978-1-905615-38-4.
- "London Bridge head spikes: From 1300 to 1660". London Remembers.
- Thornbury, Walter. "London Bridge". Old and New London. Vol. 2. pp. 9–17.
