= Jacques de Flesselles =

French politician (1730–1789)

- Provost of Merchants of Paris
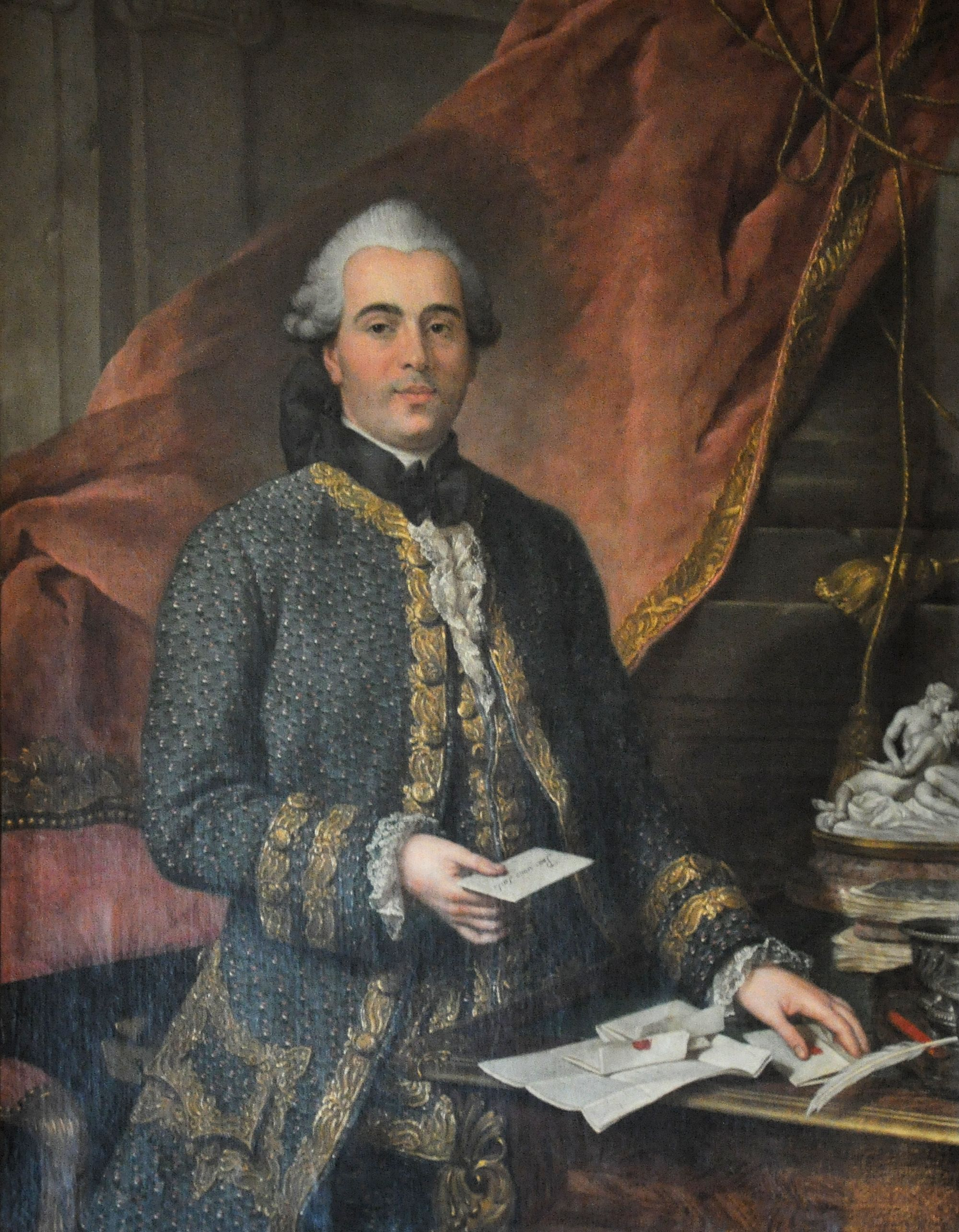
- Portrait of Jacques de Flesselles by Donat Nonnotte (Musée Carnavalet)
- Born: Bernard-René Jourdan; 11 November 1730; Paris, France
- Died: 14 July 1789 (aged 58); Hôtel de Ville, Paris
- Spouse: Élisabeth Robinet
- Father: Jacques de Flesselles

Provost of Merchants of Paris
- In office 28 April – 14 July 1789
- Preceded by: Louis Le Peletier
- Succeeded by: Position abolished: Jean Sylvain Bailly 1st Mayor of Paris

Jacques de Flesselles (French pronunciation: [ʒak də flɛsɛl]; 11 November 1730 – 14 July 1789) was a French official and one of the early victims of the French Revolution.

== Early life ==
Jacques de Flesselles was born in Paris in 1730 to a family of middle-class origins, which had recently achieved nobility status. His father, also Jacques de Flesselles, was a financial official who had served as a royal adviser. The younger de Flesselles followed a similar career path.

== Career ==
Following appointments as intendant of Moulins in 1762 and of Rennes in 1765, de Flesselles served as intendant of Lyon (1768–1784) where he won respect as a reform-minded royal official. Motivated by a personal interest in scientific development, he sponsored a Montgolfier balloon in 1784, named the Flesselles in his honour.

On 28 April 1789, de Flesselles became the last provost of the merchants of Paris, a post roughly equivalent to mayor. Three months later he faced a chaotic situation as widespread disturbances broke out and the withdrawal of the French Royal Army garrison left a vacuum of authority in central Paris.

== Outbreak of the Revolution ==
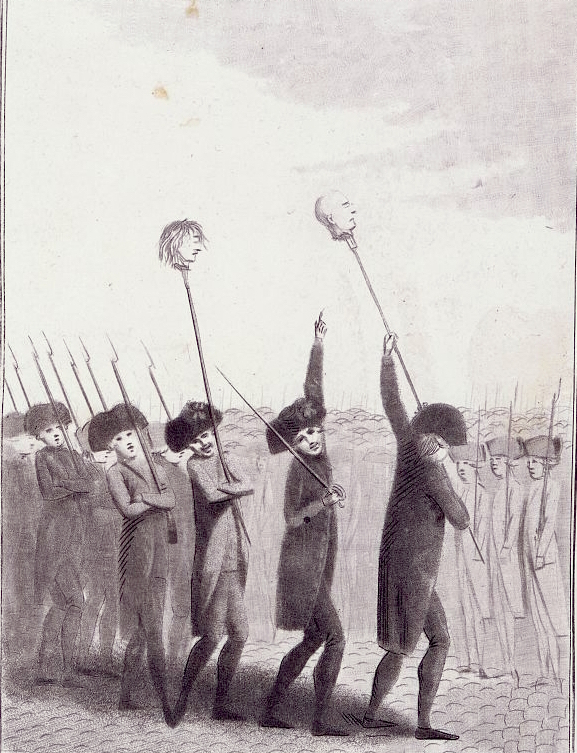
Engraving, c.1789: French militia hoist the heads of de Flesselles and the Marquis de Launay on pikes. The caption reads "Thus we avenge the traitors".

On 13 July 1789, de Flesselles received demands for weapons to equip a citizens' militia being organized to restore order. He was able to provide only three muskets from municipal stocks, and his suggestions of where other stores could be found proved misleading or mistaken. Immediately following the storming of the Bastille on 14 July, de Flesselles found himself accused of royalist sympathies by an infuriated throng surrounding the Paris City Hall. De Flesselles was shot dead by an unknown shooter on the steps of the City Hall while trying to justify his actions, and his body was decapitated. De Flesselles was one of several representatives of the ancien régime killed that day.

== See also ==
- Bernard-René Jourdan de Launay - governor of the Bastille who was also killed during the storming of the Bastille.
