= Siege of the Bastille (Cholat) =

1789 painting by Claude Cholat

La Prise de la Bastille: 14 Juillet 1789
- The Taking of the Bastille: 14 July 1789 (English)
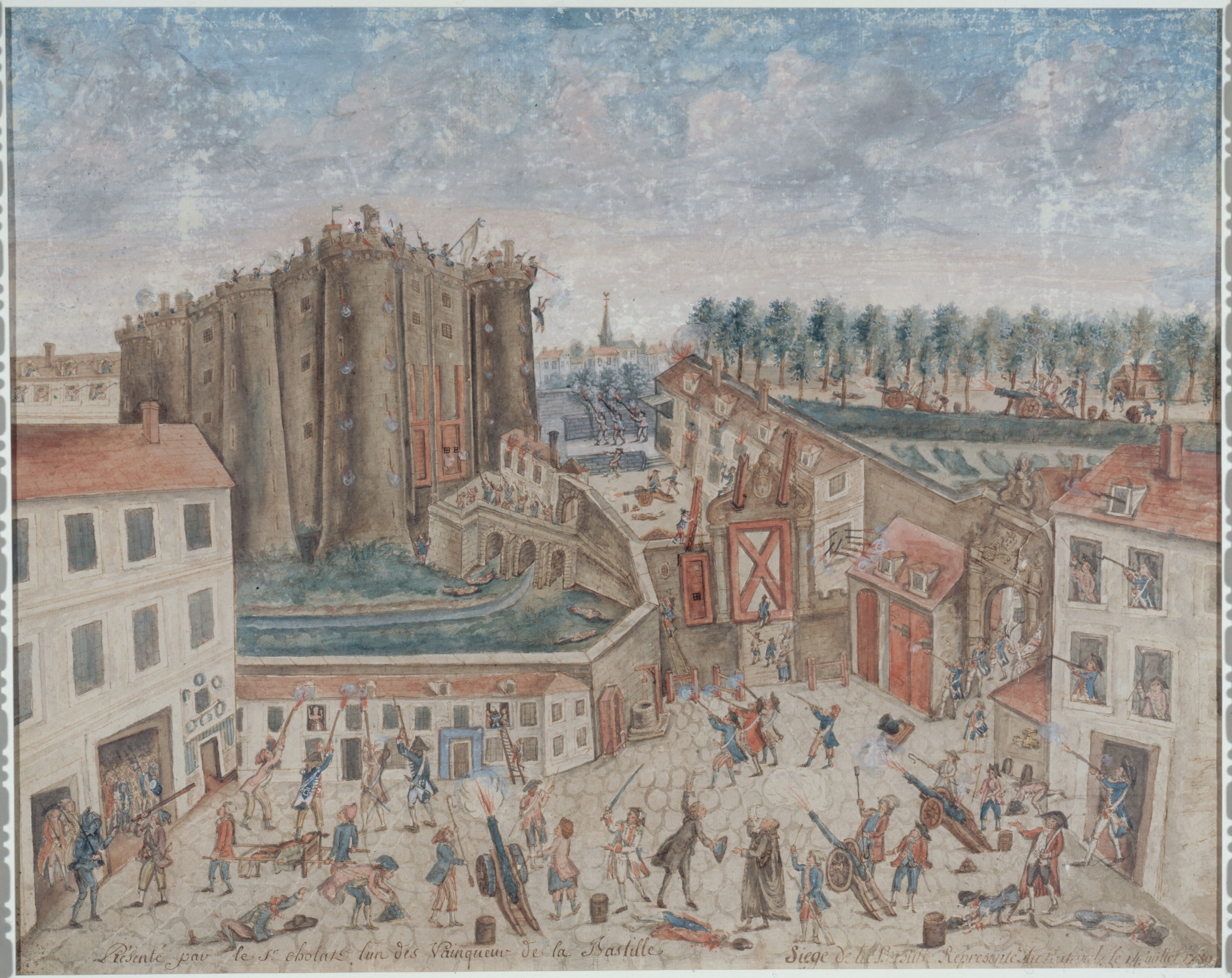
- Artist: Claude Cholat
- Year: 1789
- Type: Gouache
- Owner: Carnavalet Museum

Siege of the Bastille (French: La Prise de la Bastille) is a gouache painting by Claude Cholat depicting the Storming of the Bastille. The painting is now in the Carnavalet Museum in Paris, France.

== Details ==
Claude Cholat was a wine merchant living in Paris on the Rue Noyer at the start of the French Revolution in 1789. On the morning of 14 July a large Revolutionary crowd gathered outside the royal prison called the Bastille and in the afternoon fighting broke out between the crowd and the royal garrison. Cholat fought on the side of the Revolutionaries, manning one of their cannon during the battle. Afterwards, he produced the famous amateur gouache painting showing the events of the day; produced in primitive, naïve style. It combines all the events of the day into a single graphical representation.

== Bibliography ==
- Schama, Simon. (2004) Citizens: a Chronicle of the French Revolution London: Penguin. ISBN 978-0-14-101727-3.
