= Vela Peeva =

Bulgarian communist activist (1922–1944)

- Born: Vela Peeva Peeva; 16 March 1922; Kamenitsa, Bulgaria (part of present day Velingrad)
- Died: 3 May 1944 (aged 22); Near present day Velingrad, Bulgaria

Vela Peeva (Bulgarian: Вела Пеева) (16 March 1922 – 3 May 1944) with the nom de guerre Penka was a communist partisan and activist of the Bulgarian Workers Youth League and the Bulgarian Communist Party during World War II.

== Early life and education ==
Vela Peeva was born on 16 March 1922 to ethnic Bulgarian parents Peyo and Katerina in the village of Kamenitsa, today a neighbourhood of Velingrad. She has three siblings: an older brother, sisters Yordana and Todor, and a younger sister, Gera. As a teenager and bright student, she was sent to live alone in Pazardzhik to attend a prestigious high school and achieve a better future than was possible in her hometown.

In 1941, she was accepted at the University of Sofia, where she studied Pedagogy and Geography. However, she did not graduate, as she chose to be a partisan instead.

== Life with the Bulgarian Communist Party and death ==
In 1939, Vela joined the Workers' Youth League, a communist organization. In 1943, Vela became a member of the Bulgarian Communist Party and joined an anti-fascist group along with fellow communist partisan Stoyo Kalpazanov and her sister Gera. When Gera fell ill with a cold in 1944, Vela volunteered to take her place in an assignment. The assignment was to collect food from the village of Ladzhene and sneak it up to the partisans in the mountains. After she and Stoyo Kalpazanov had collected the food, they were betrayed on the way back, and Stoyo was captured. Vela, seriously wounded, managed to escape and crawl away to a cliff, where she hid for forty days. A local forest worker brought her food and medicines. Fearing that the gendarmerie would discover that he was assisting Vela, he betrayed her to them. Vela was surrounded by the gendarmerie and is believed to have turned her gun on herself to avoid being captured alive. After her death, the gendarmerie beheaded her body and strode around the nearby villages with Vela's head impaled on a spike.

== Post-death ==
After beheading Vela, the fascists went to Stoyo Kalpazanov's cell and began interrogating him about the whereabouts of the remaining partisans. However, he remained loyal to them and refused to give any information. He was shot for this.

Following Vela's death, she was named a Bulgarian national heroine by the communists and her birthplace was turned into a museum. Her sister, Gera, who had meant to take her place in the anti-fascist activities, wrote a book about her years after her death.
