= Bernard-René Jourdan de Launay =

French Royal Army officer (1740–1789)

- Marquis of Launay
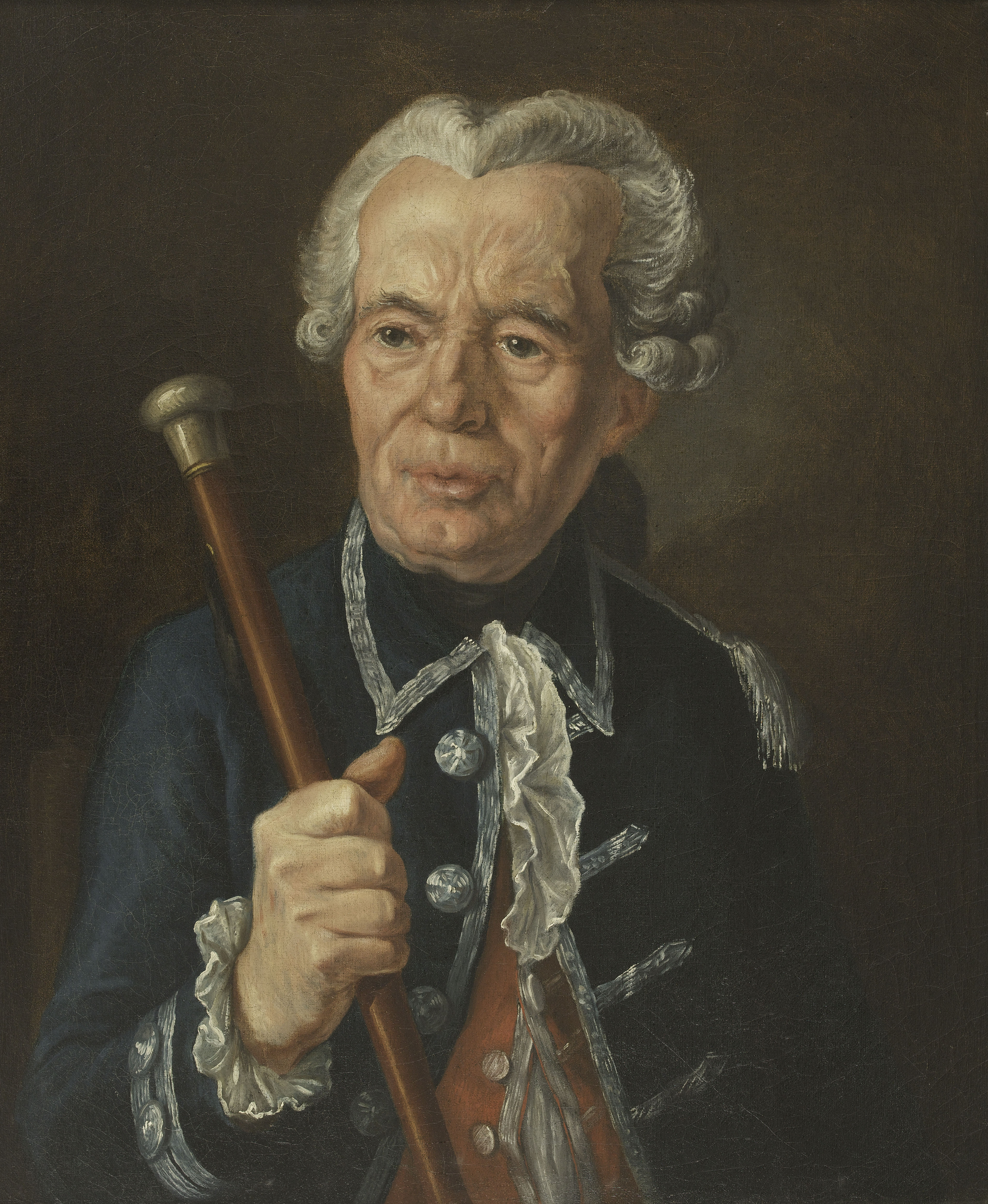
- Presumed portrait of de Launay
- Born: Bernard-René Jourdan; 8/9 April 1740; Bastille, Paris
- Died: 14 July 1789 (aged 49); Place de Greve, Paris
- Spouses: Ursule Philippe; Geneviève Thérèse Le Boursier
- Issue: Adrienne Renée Ursule; Catherine Geneviève Charlotte Gabrielle Ursule
- Father: René Jourdan de Launay
- Mother: Charlotte Renée Aubry d'Armanville

Governor of the Bastille
- In post October 1776 – 14 July 1789
- Preceded by: Antoine-Joseph de Jumilhac
- Succeeded by: Position abolished during French Revolution: Prosper Soulès Provisional Governor of the Bastille

Bernard René Jourdan, marquis de Launay (8/9 April 1740 – 14 July 1789) was a French Royal Army officer who served as the governor of the Bastille. He was the son of a previous governor, and commander of the Bastille's garrison when it was stormed on 14 July 1789. De Launay was removed from the Bastille and murdered by an angry mob in the streets of Paris. Following his death, de Launay's head was affixed on a pike and paraded through the city.

== Early life ==
The marquis Bernard-René Jordan de Launay was born on the night of 8/9 April 1740 in the Bastille where his father, René Jourdan de Launay, was governor. At the age of eight, he was appointed to an honorary position in the King's Musketeers (mousquetaires du roi). He subsequently joined the French Guards Regiment, which was permanently stationed in Paris except in time of war.

In 1776 de Launay succeeded M. de Jumilhac as governor of the Bastille. As was the custom with many senior positions under the ancien régime, the marquis purchased the office of governor from his predecessor as a form of investment. The 13 years he spent in this position were mostly uneventful, but on 19 December 1778, he reportedly made the mistake of failing to fire the cannon of the Bastille as a salute on the birth of King Louis XVI's daughter Madame Royale. In August 1785, he was given responsibility for the imprisonment of two prime figures in the royal necklace scandal: Cardinal Louis de Rohan and Jeanne de La Motte-Valois. De Launay behaved correctly and considerately with both although the latter was an extremely difficult inmate.

Until 1777, he was Seigneur of Bretonnière in Normandy. He also owned and rented out houses in the rue Saint-Antoine, neighbouring the Bastille.

== Role on 14 July 1789: storming of the Bastille ==
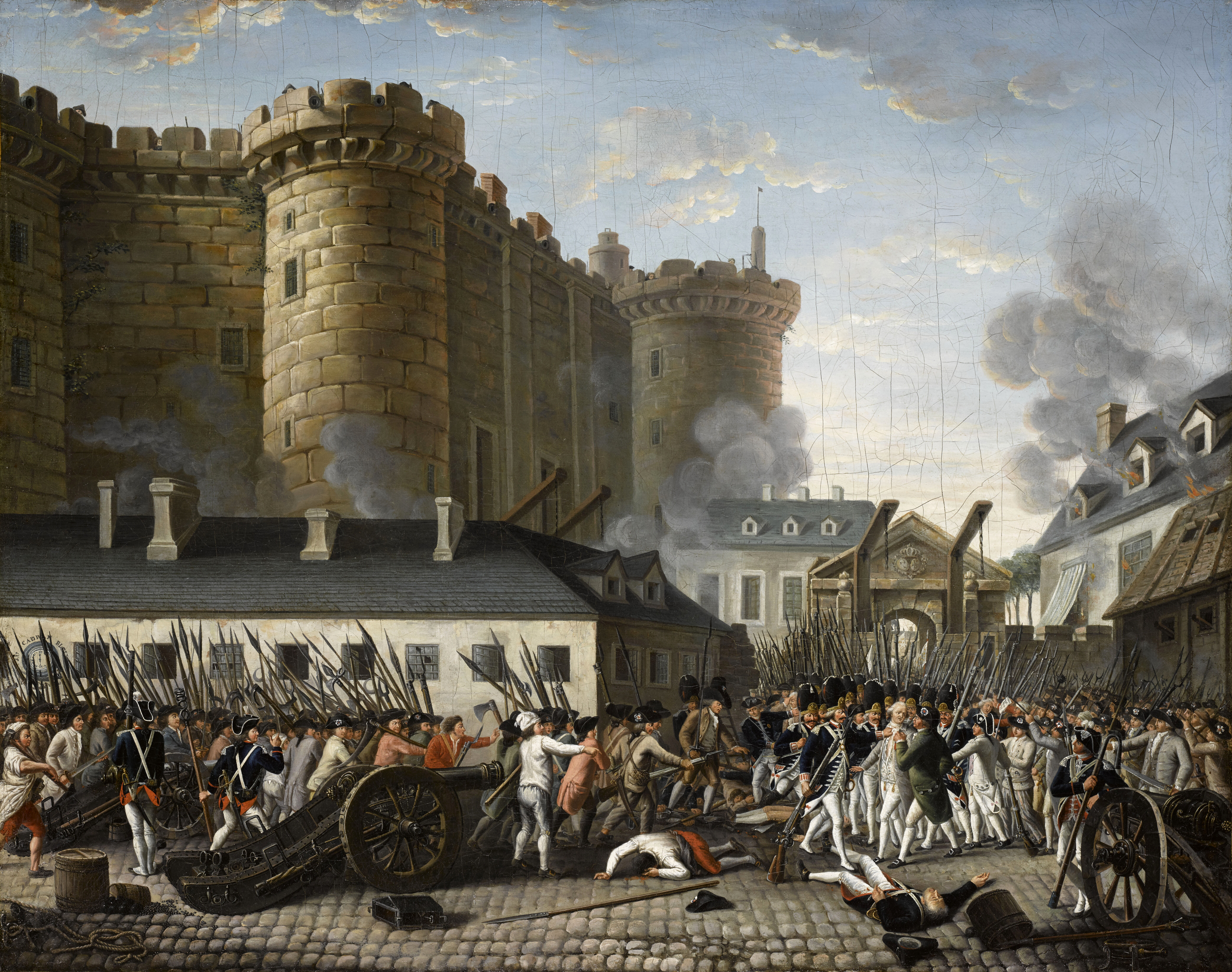
Anonymous painting of the storming of the Bastille. De Launay is shown on the right being led away from the building by pro-revolutionary soldiers.

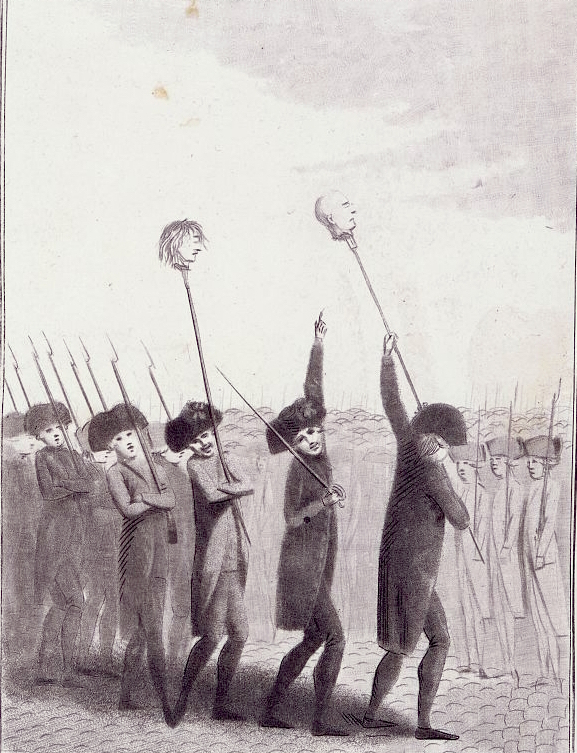
1789 engraving of the beheaded Mayor of Paris Flesselles and de Launay. The caption reads "This is how we get revenge on traitors".

The permanent garrison of the Bastille, under de Launay, consisted of about 82 invalides (veteran military pensioners) no longer considered suitable for regular army service. On 12 July, in response to the growing civil unrest, they were reinforced by 32 Swiss grenadiers from the Salis-Samade Regiment.

Unlike Sombreuil, the governor of the Hôtel des Invalides, who had accepted the revolutionaries' demands earlier that day, de Launay refused to surrender the prison fortress and hand over the arms and the gunpowder stored in the cellars. He promised that he would not fire unless attacked, and he tried to negotiate with two delegates from the Hôtel de Ville, but the discussions were drawn out. Part of the impatient crowd started to enter the outer courtyard of the fortress after a small group had broken the chains securing the drawbridge.

After shouting warnings, the garrison opened fire. The besiegers interpreted that as treachery on the part of de Launay. The ensuing fighting lasted about four hours and resulted in about 100 casualties among the exposed crowd but only one death and three wounded amongst the well-protected defenders firing from loopholes and battlements.

With no source of water and only limited food supplies within the Bastille, de Launay decided to capitulate on the condition that nobody from within the fortress would be harmed. In a note passed out through an opening in the drawbridge, he threatened that he would blow up the entire fortress and the surrounding district if those conditions were rejected. De Launay's conditions were rejected, but he nevertheless capitulated reportedly after members of the garrison prevented him from entering the cellars in which the gunpowder was stored. At about 5 p.m., firing from the fortress ceased, and the drawbridge was suddenly lowered.

De Launay was then seized, and his sword and baton of rank were torn from him. He was supposed to have been taken to the Hôtel de Ville by one of the leaders of the insurrection, the soldier Pierre-Augustin Hulin. However, on the way there, the furious crowd assaulted the governor, beat him and eventually killed him by stabbing him repeatedly with their knives, swords and bayonets and shooting him once. The actual killing was reported to have taken place near the Hôtel de Ville when the struggling de Launay, desperate and abused, cried out "Enough! Let me die!" and kicked an unemployed cook named Desnot in the groin.

After he had been killed, Launay's head was sawn off by Mathieu Jouve Jourdan, a butcher. It was fixed on a pike, carried through the streets for some hours, and thrown into the Seine the next day. Three officers of the Bastille's permanent garrison and two of their veterans were also lynched, and two of the Swiss were unaccounted for. However, most of the defenders were escorted through the mob by French Guards, who had joined the attackers, and were eventually released.

== Family, legacy and character ==
De Launay had three daughters by two wives. Some of his brother's descendants (Boris Delaunay and Vadim Delaunay) settled in Russia.

Historian Simon Schama describes de Launay as a "reasonably conscientious if somewhat dour" functionary, who treated prisoners more humanely than his predecessors had. The Marquis de Sade, who had been transferred from the Bastille to another prison shortly before 14 July, commented that de Launay was "a so-called marquis whose grandfather was a servant".

The officer commanding the Swiss detachment of the Regiment de Salis-Samade sent to reinforce de Launay, Lieutenant Ludwig von Flüe, subsequently accused his late superior of military incompetence, inexperience and irresolution, which he had allegedly displayed before the siege. von Flüe's report, which was copied into the log book of his regiment and has survived, may not be fair to de Launay, who was put in an impossible position by the failure of the senior officers commanding the Royal troops concentrated in and around Paris to provide him with effective support. However Marshal de Broglie, who as Minister of War was in overall charge of the abortive efforts to suppress the disturbances of 1789, had written on 5 July that "there are two sources of anxiety concerning the Bastille; the person of the commandant (de Launay) and the nature of the garrison there".

The killing of de Launay is described graphically in Charles Dickens's A Tale of Two Cities (Book II, Chapter 21) and also in Hilary Mantel's A Place of Greater Safety.

== See also ==
- Jacques de Flesselles
