= Between Yesterday and Tomorrow =

Between Yesterday and Tomorrow may refer to:

- A 1913 sculptural group by Edith Howland located at Brookgreen Gardens
- Between Yesterday and Tomorrow (film), a 1947 German film
- Between Yesterday and Tomorrow (1954 film), a 1954 Japanese film
- A song written by Michel Legrand with lyrics by Alan and Marilyn Bergman that has been recorded by various artists
- A 2009 album by Ute Lemper
