= Pont Alexandre III =

Deck arch bridge in Paris

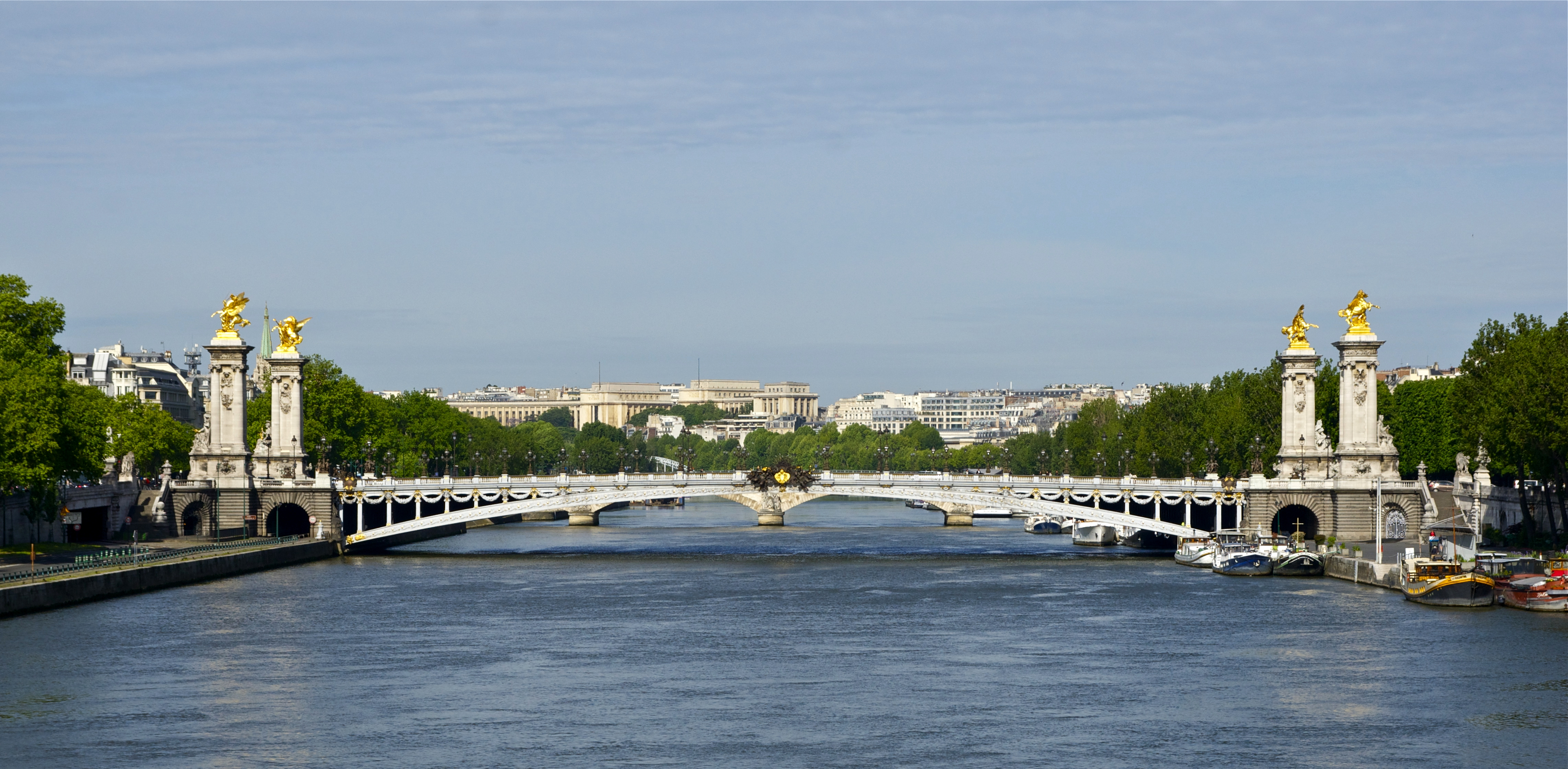
- The bridge seen from the Pont de la Concorde, 2012
- Coordinates: 48°51′49″N 2°18′49″E
- Crosses: The Seine River
- Locale: Paris, France
- Next upstream: Pont de la Concorde
- Next downstream: Pont des Invalides

Characteristics
- Total length: 160 metres (520 ft)
- Width: 40 metres (130 ft)

History
- Opened: 1900; 126 years ago

Location
- Interactive map of Pont Alexandre III

Location on the Seine in Paris.

The Pont Alexandre III (French pronunciation: [pɔ̃ alɛksɑ̃dʁ tʁwa]) is a deck arch bridge that spans the Seine in Paris. It connects the Champs-Élysées quarter with those of the Invalides and Eiffel Tower. The bridge is widely regarded as the most ornate, extravagant bridge in the city. It has been classified as a French monument historique since 1975.

== History ==
The Beaux-Arts style bridge, with its exuberant Art Nouveau lamps, cherubs, nymphs and winged horses at both ends, was built between 1896 and 1900. It is named after Tsar Alexander III of Russia, who had concluded the Franco-Russian Alliance in 1892. His son Nicholas II laid the foundation stone in October 1896. The style of the bridge reflects that of the Grand Palais, to which it leads on the right bank.

The construction of the bridge is a marvel of 19th century engineering, consisting of a 6 metres (20 ft) high single span steel arch. The design, by the architects Joseph Cassien-Bernard and Gaston Cousin, was constrained by the need to keep the bridge from obscuring the view of the Champs-Élysées or the Invalides.

The bridge was built by the engineers Jean Résal and Amédée Alby. It was inaugurated in 1900 for the Exposition Universelle (universal exhibition) World's Fair, as were the nearby Grand Palais and Petit Palais.

== Sculptures ==
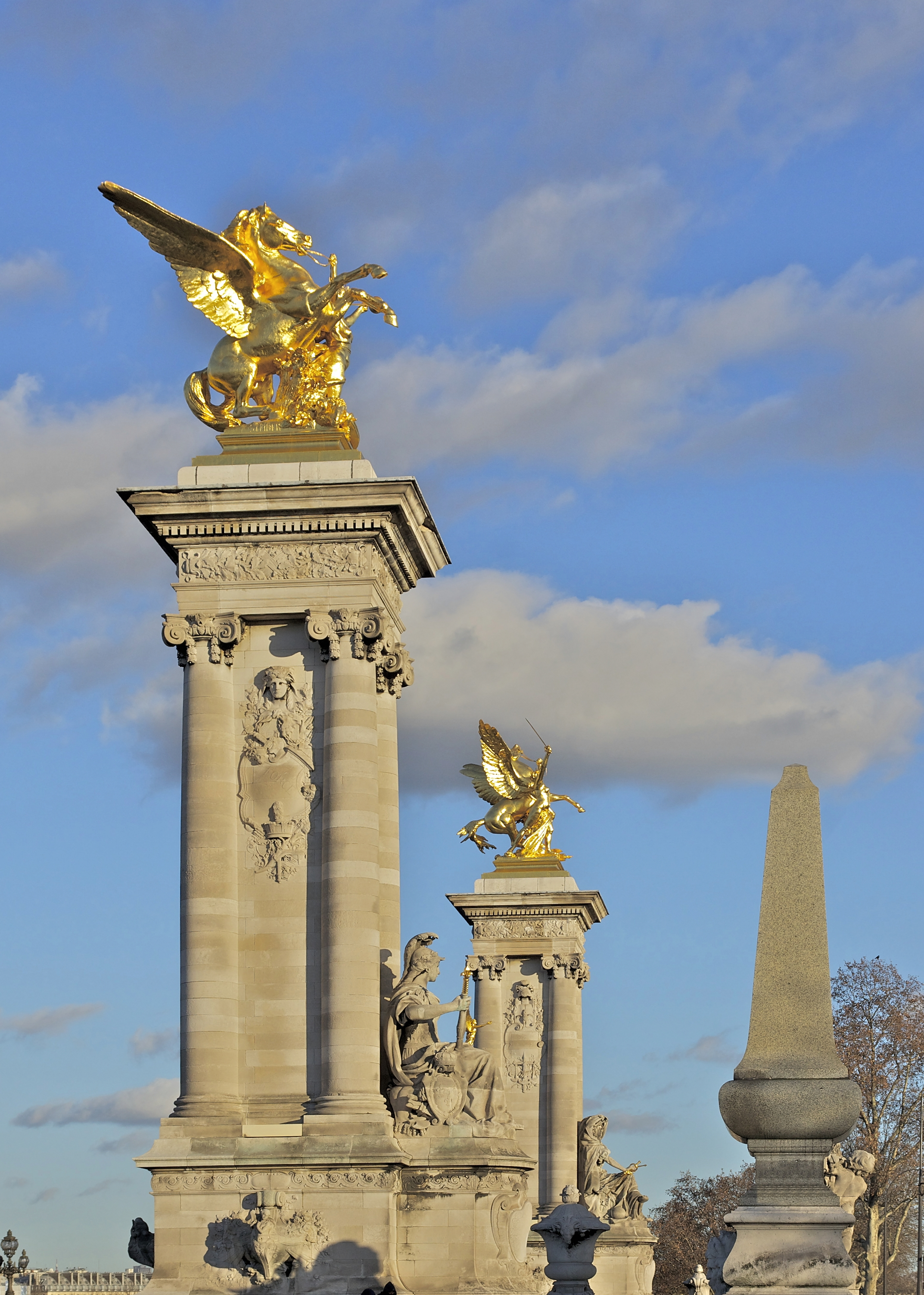
Gilded Fames sculptures on the socle counterweights.

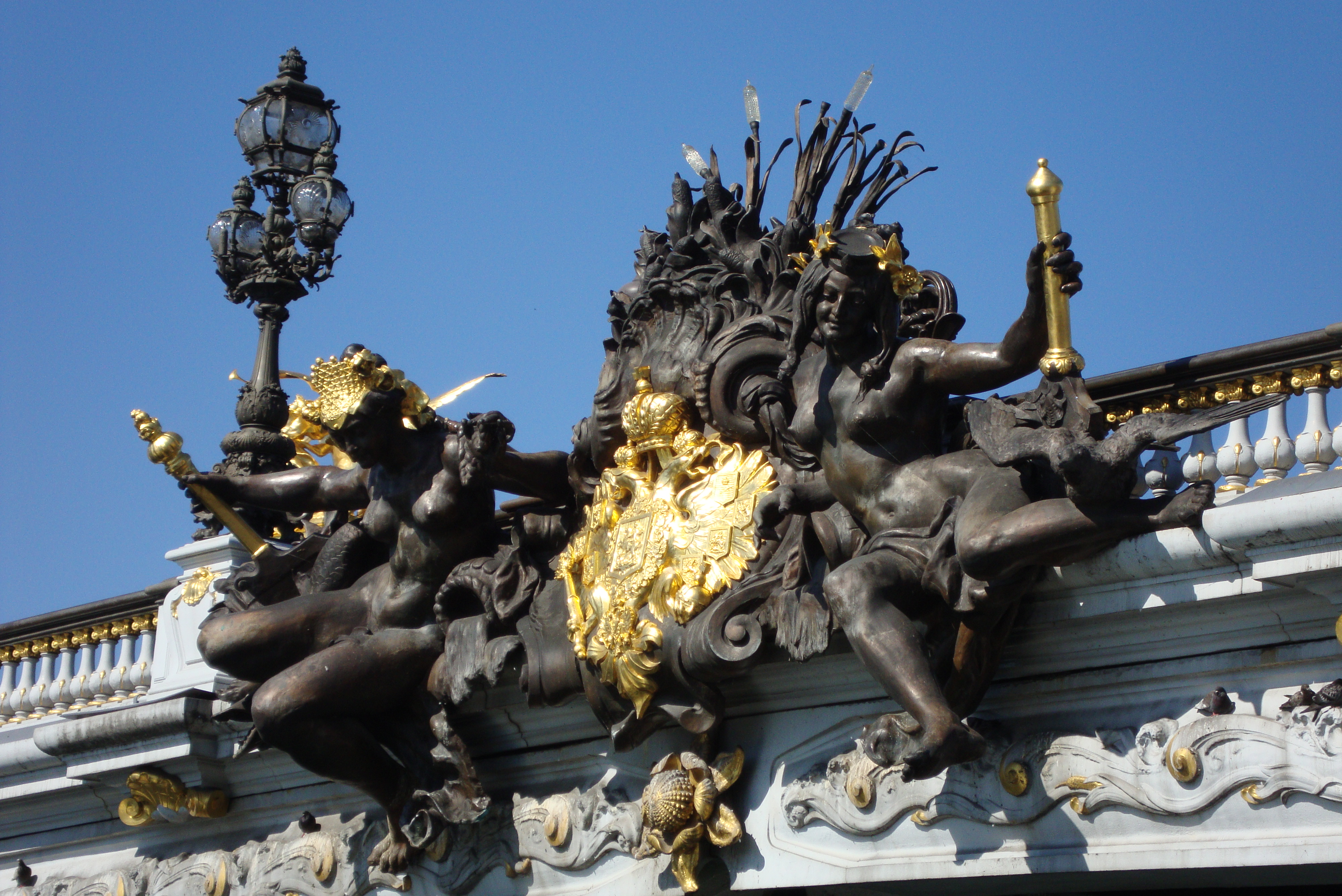
Nymphs of the Neva relief.

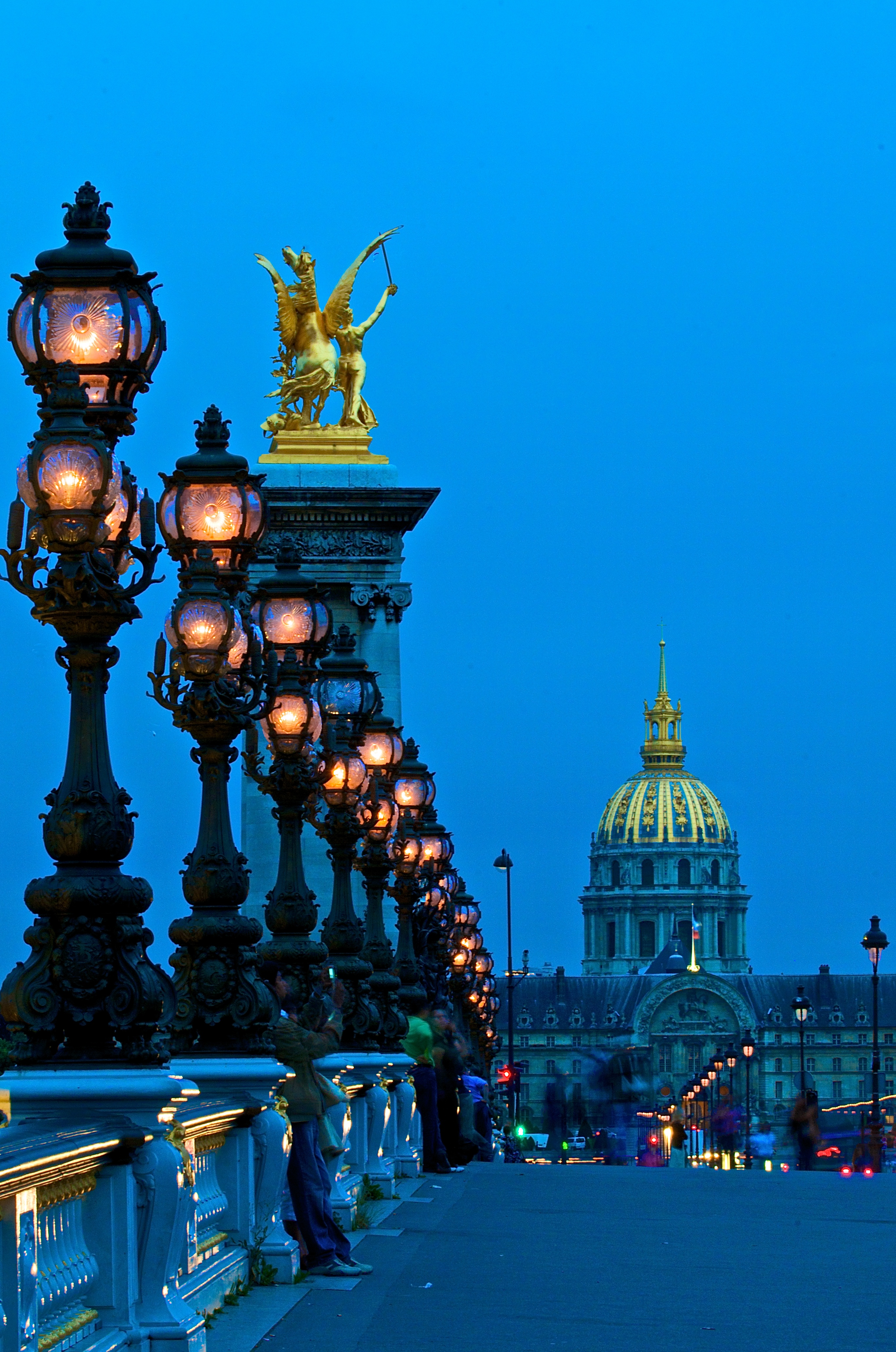
Twilight view, looking toward the dome of Les Invalides

Numerous sculptors provided the sculptures that feature prominently on the bridge.

=== Fames ===
Four gilt-bronze statues of Fames watch over the bridge, supported on massive 17 metres (56 ft) masonry socles, that provide stabilizing counterweight for the arch, without interfering with monumental views. The socles are crowned by Fames restraining Pegasus.

- On the Right Bank: Renommée des Sciences ("Fame of the Sciences") and the Renommée des Arts ("Fame of the Arts"), both by Emmanuel Frémiet. At their bases, La France Contemporaine ("Contemporary France") by Gustave Michel and France de Charlemagne ("France of Charlemagne") by Alfred Lenoir. The lions groups are by Georges Gardet.
- On the Left Bank: Renommée du Commerce ("Fame of Commerce") by Pierre Granet and Renommée de l'Industrie ("Fame of Industry") by Clément Steiner. At their bases, France de la Renaissance ("France of the Renaissance") by Jules Coutan and La France de Louis XIV ("France of Louis XIV") by Laurent Marqueste. The lions groups are by Jules Dalou.

=== Nymphs ===
The nymph reliefs are at the centres of the arches over the Seine, memorials to the Franco-Russian Alliance. The Nymphs of the Seine has a relief of the arms of Paris, and faces the Nymphs of the Neva with the arms of Imperial Russia. They are both executed in hammered copper over forms by Georges Récipon.

In the same political spirit, the Trinity Bridge in Saint Petersburg was conceived as a memorial to the Franco-Russian Alliance.

== Gallery ==
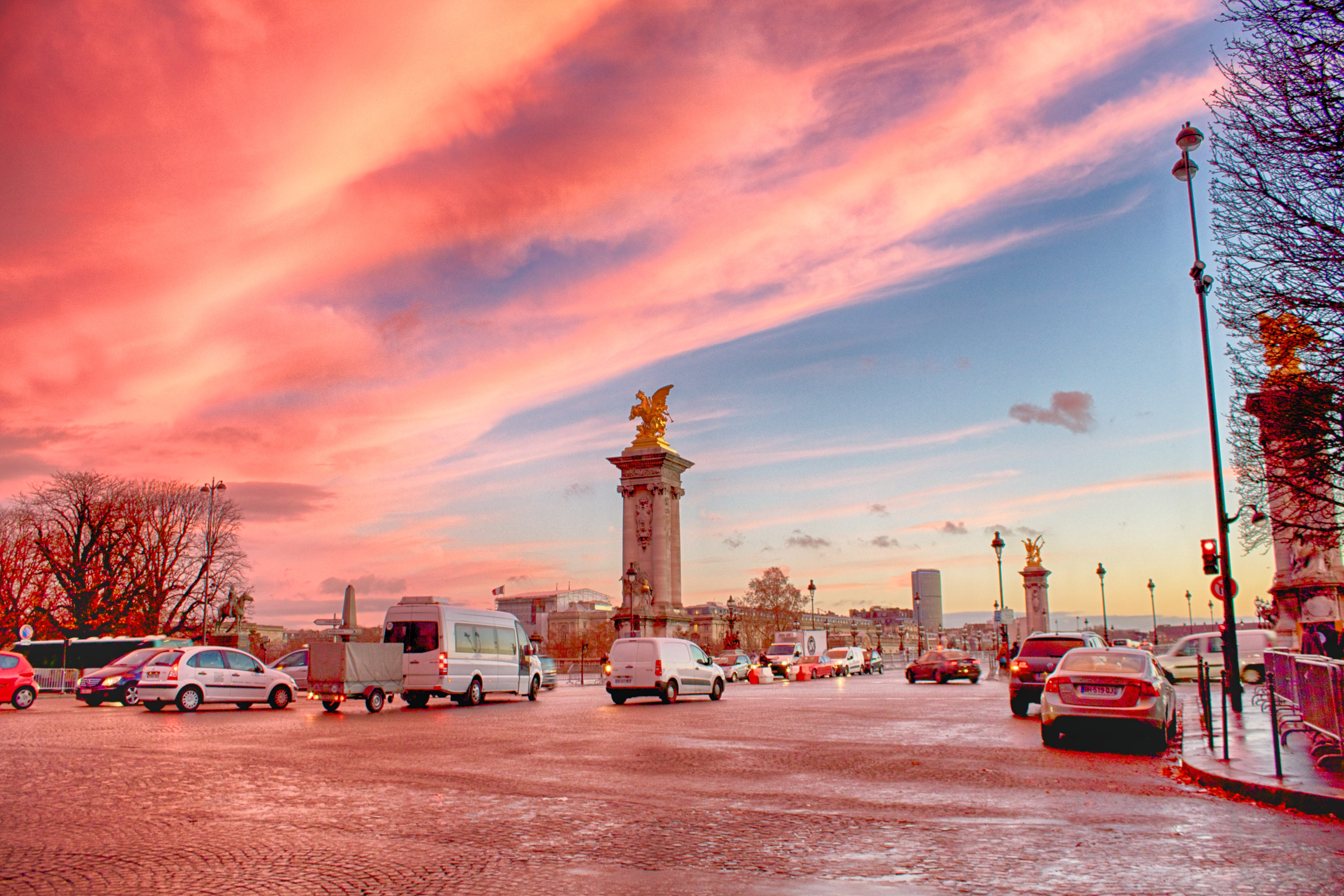
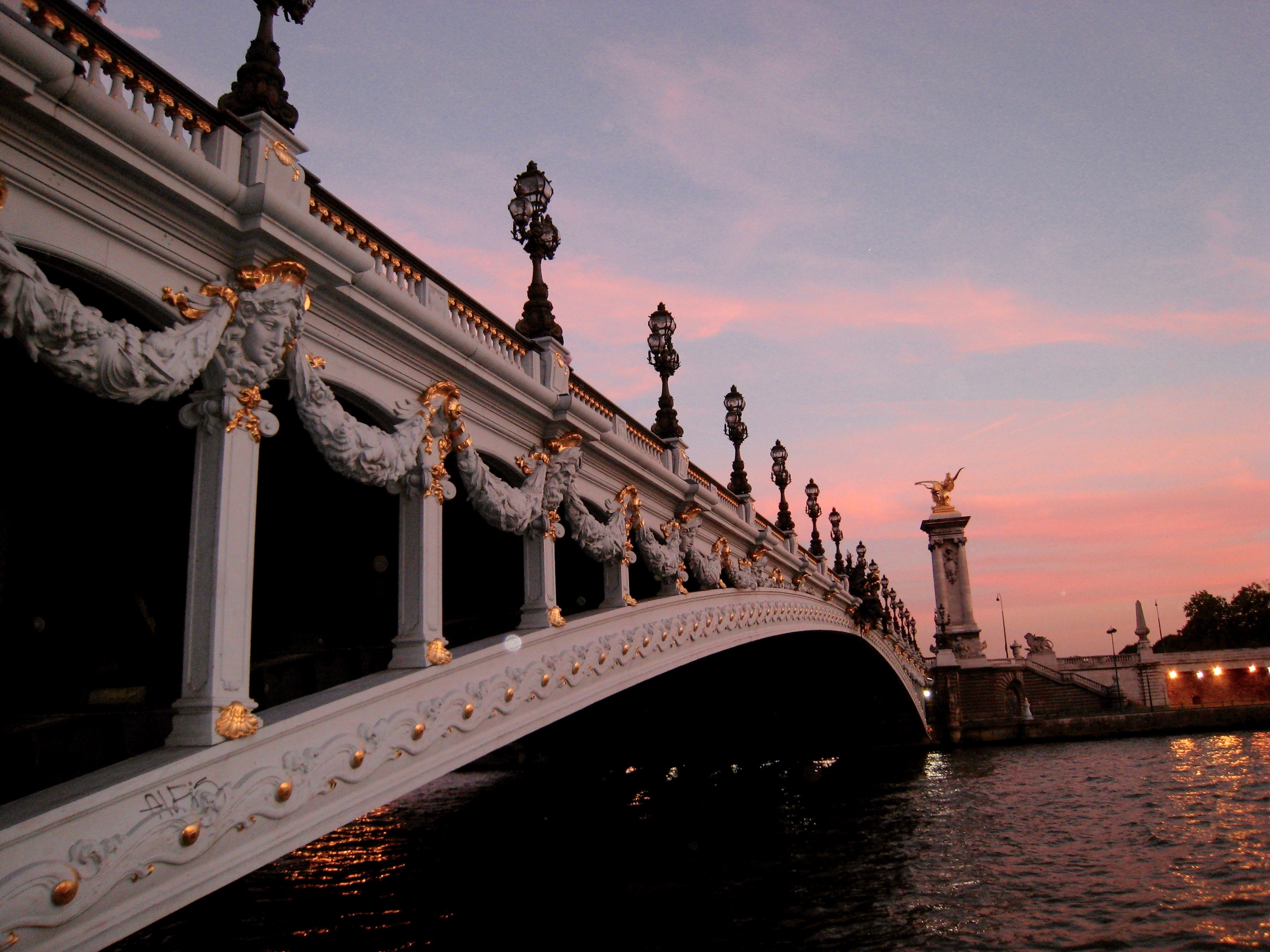

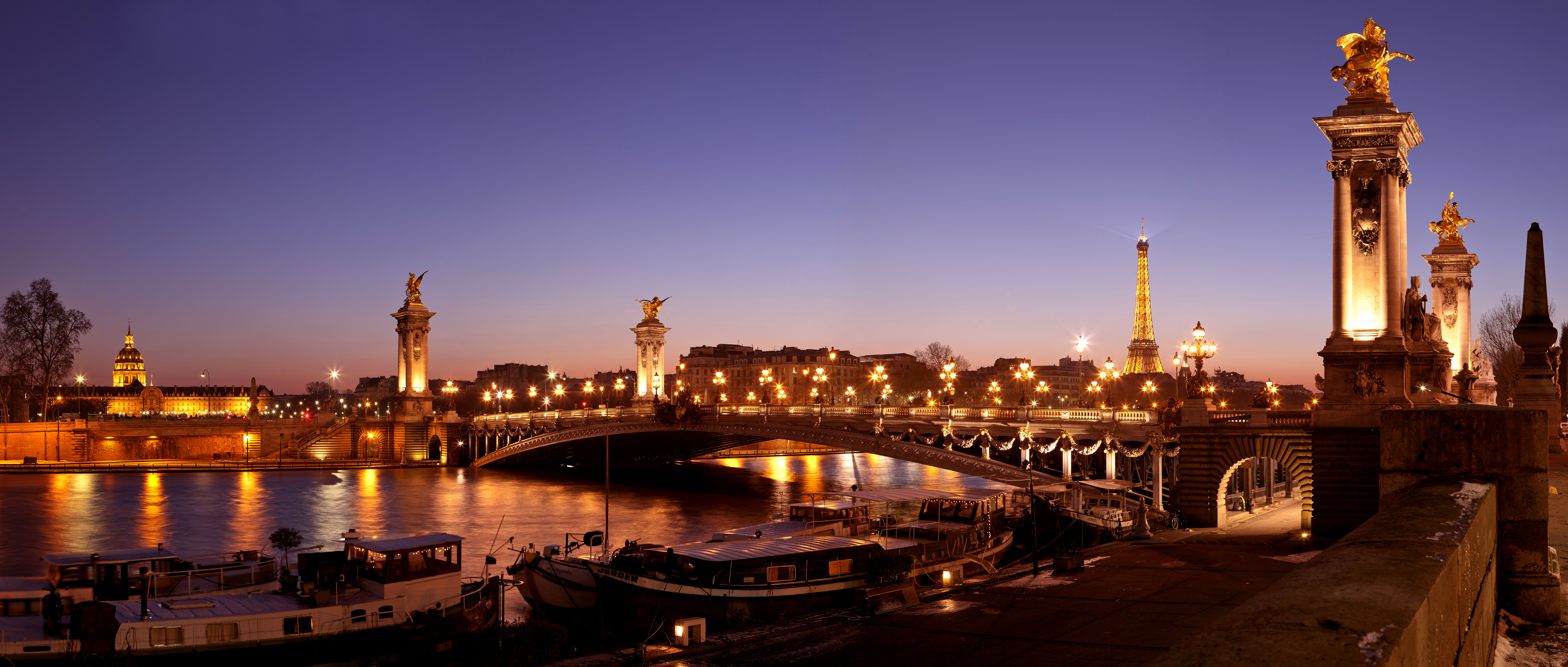

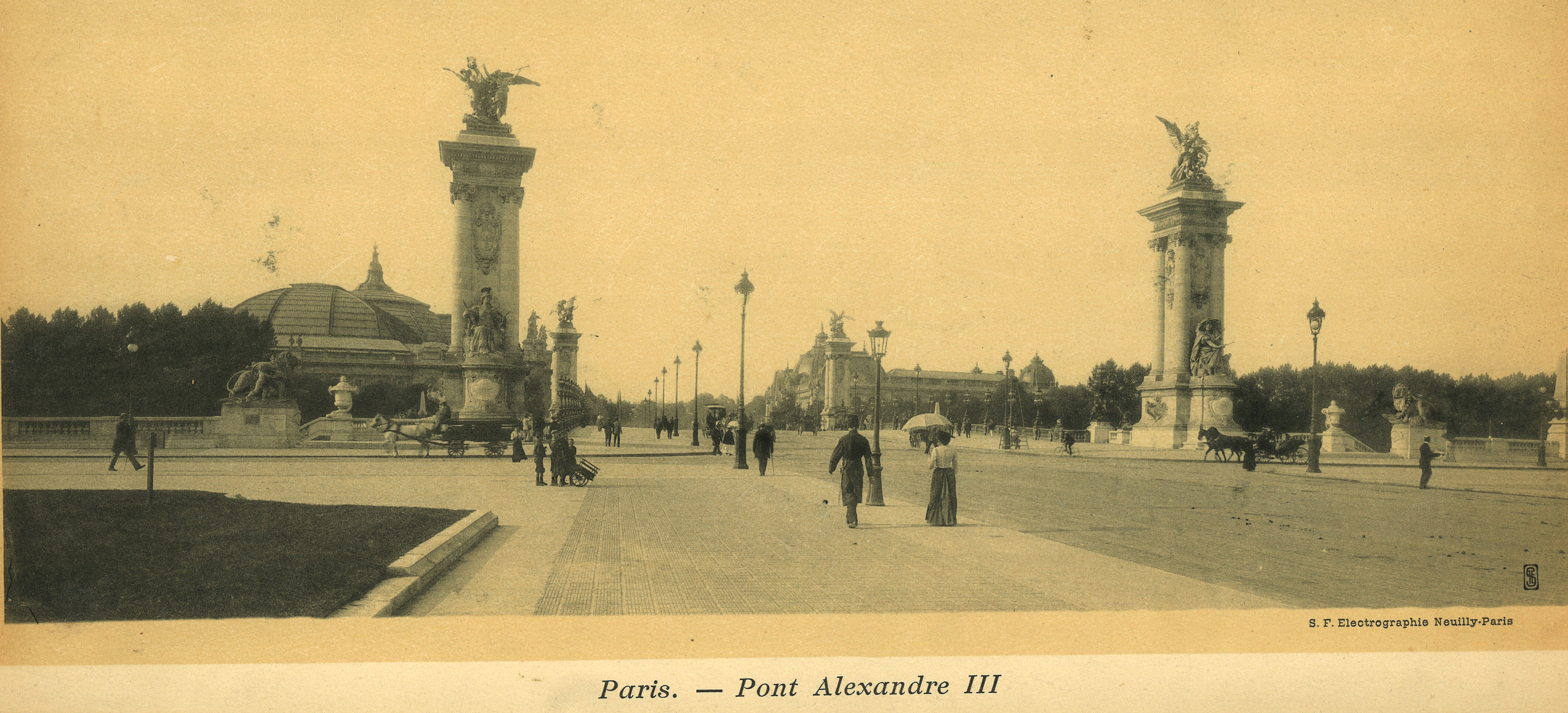

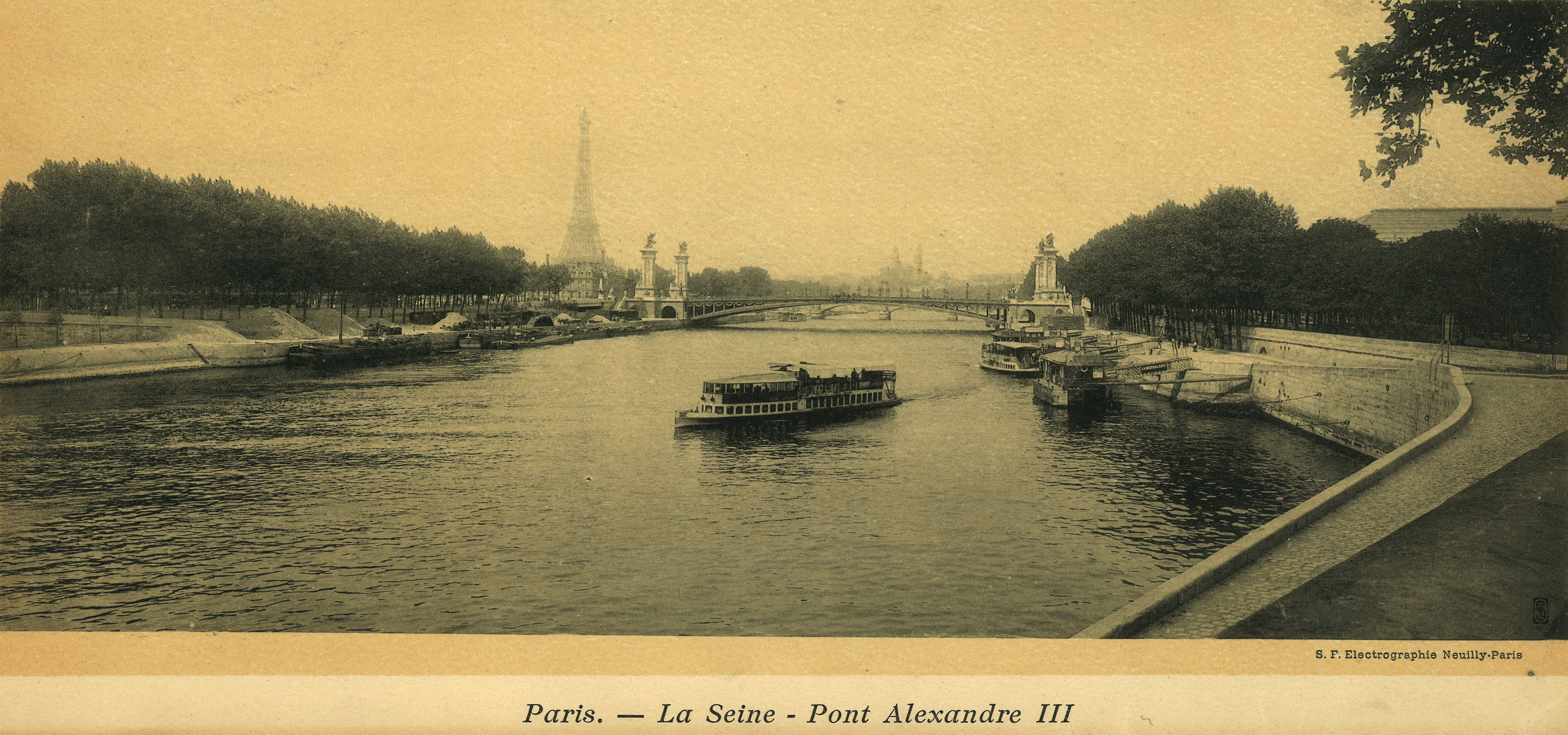

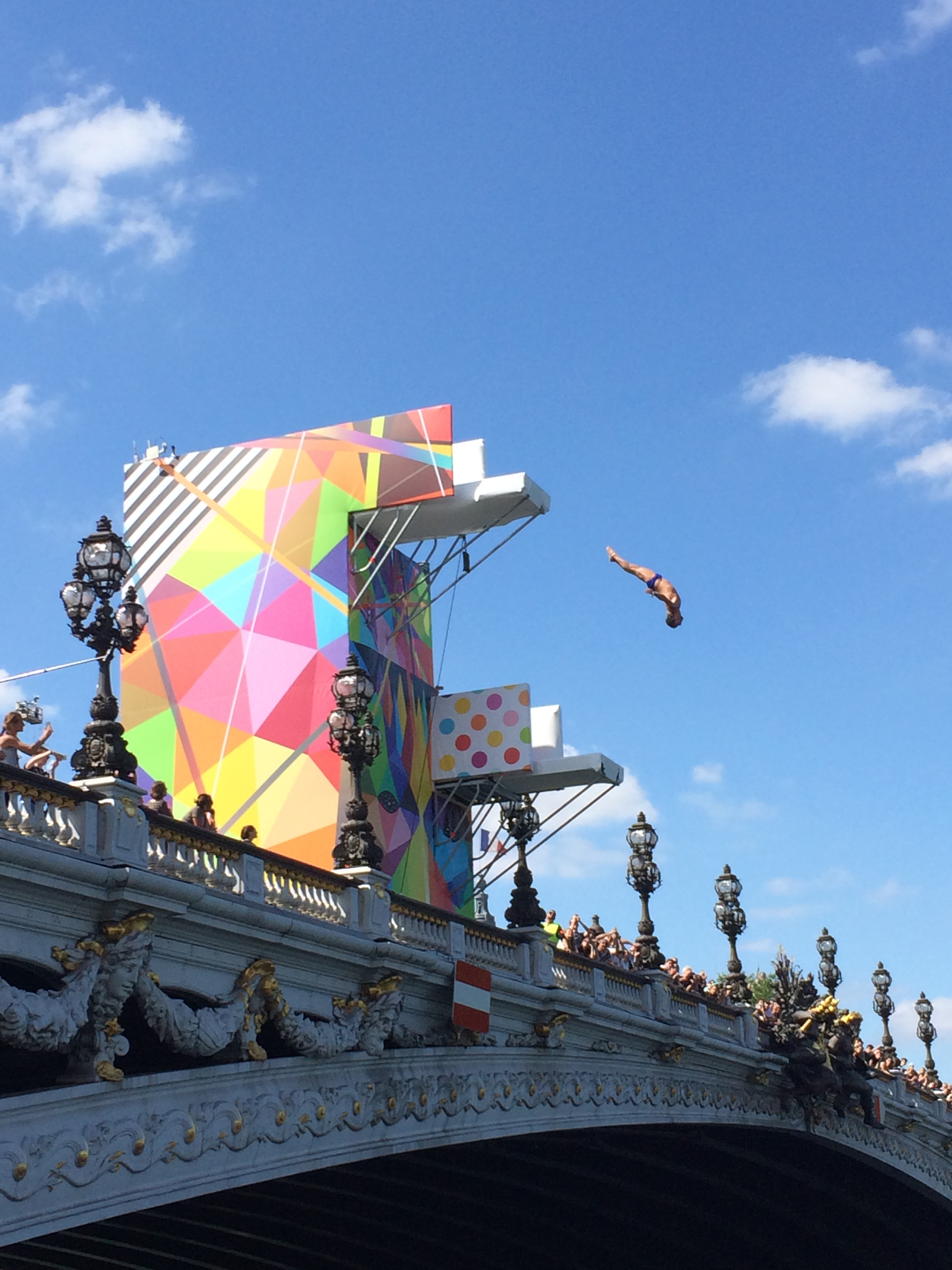

== See also ==
- List of bridges in France
