= Pont Rouelle =

Bridge in Paris, France

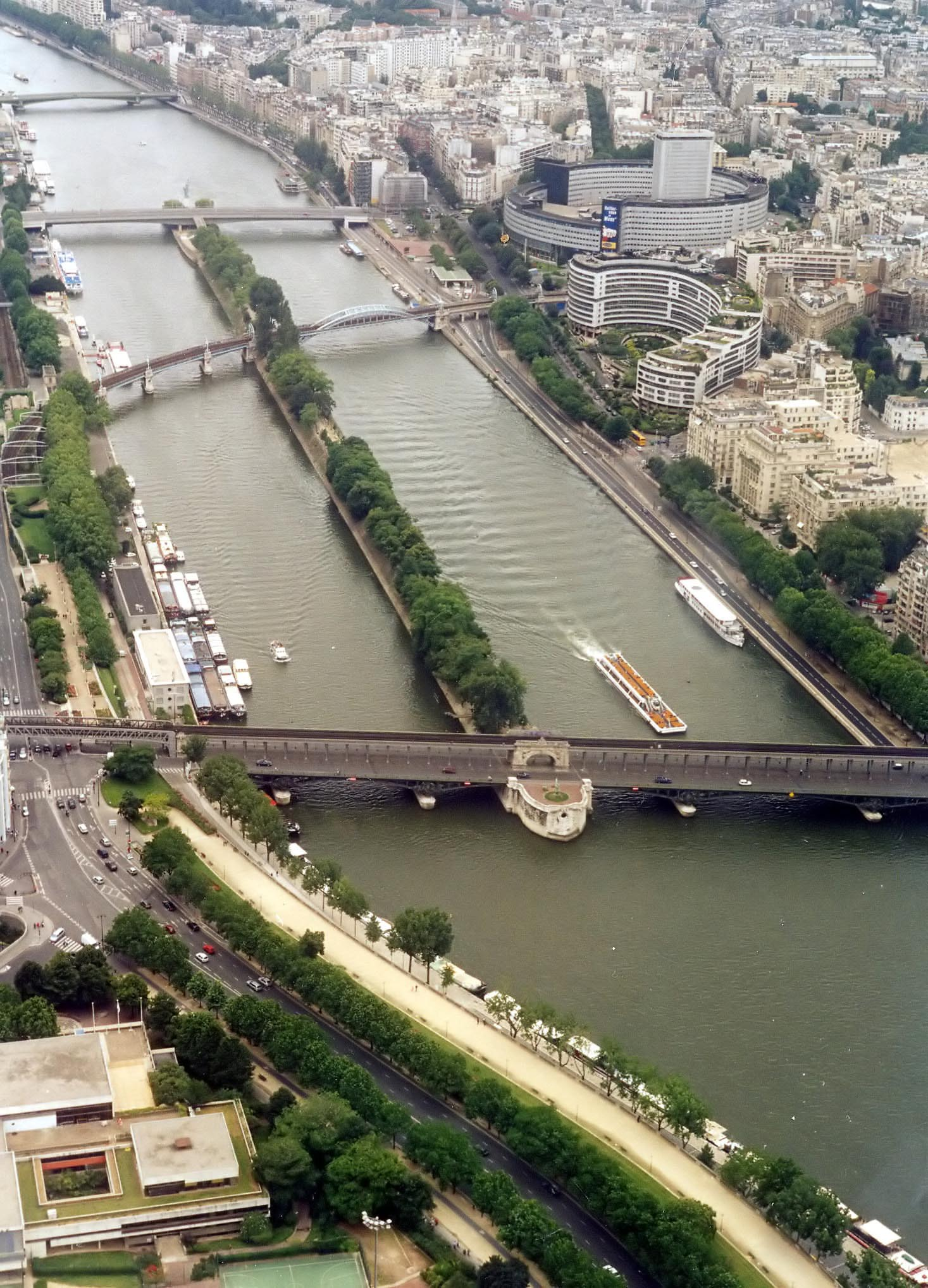
- The Pont Rouelle is the third bridge from the top, crossing the central portion of the Île aux Cygnes.
- Coordinates: 48°51′08″N 2°16′59″E
- Crosses: The Seine River
- Locale: Paris, France
- Next upstream: Pont de Bir-Hakeim
- Next downstream: Pont de Grenelle

The Pont Rouelle (French pronunciation: [pɔ̃ ʁwɛl], Rouelle Bridge) is a railway bridge in Paris that crosses the river Seine. It connects the city's 15th and 16th arrondissements, and passes through the Île aux Cygnes. Constructed of steel, the bridge is 173 metres (567 feet) long and 20 metres (66 feet) wide. It is currently used for railway service, carrying the RER C.

== Structure ==
It is composed of four distinct portions:

- On the Right Bank, an arch in masonry spans the bank road.
- The portion that spans the right arm of the Seine consists of a single metal arch.
- The part which crosses the Île aux Cygnes spans the island's pedestrian alley with a small stone arch.
- The part which spans the left arm of the river, reaching the Left Bank, rests on two piles in the Seine.

== Gallery ==
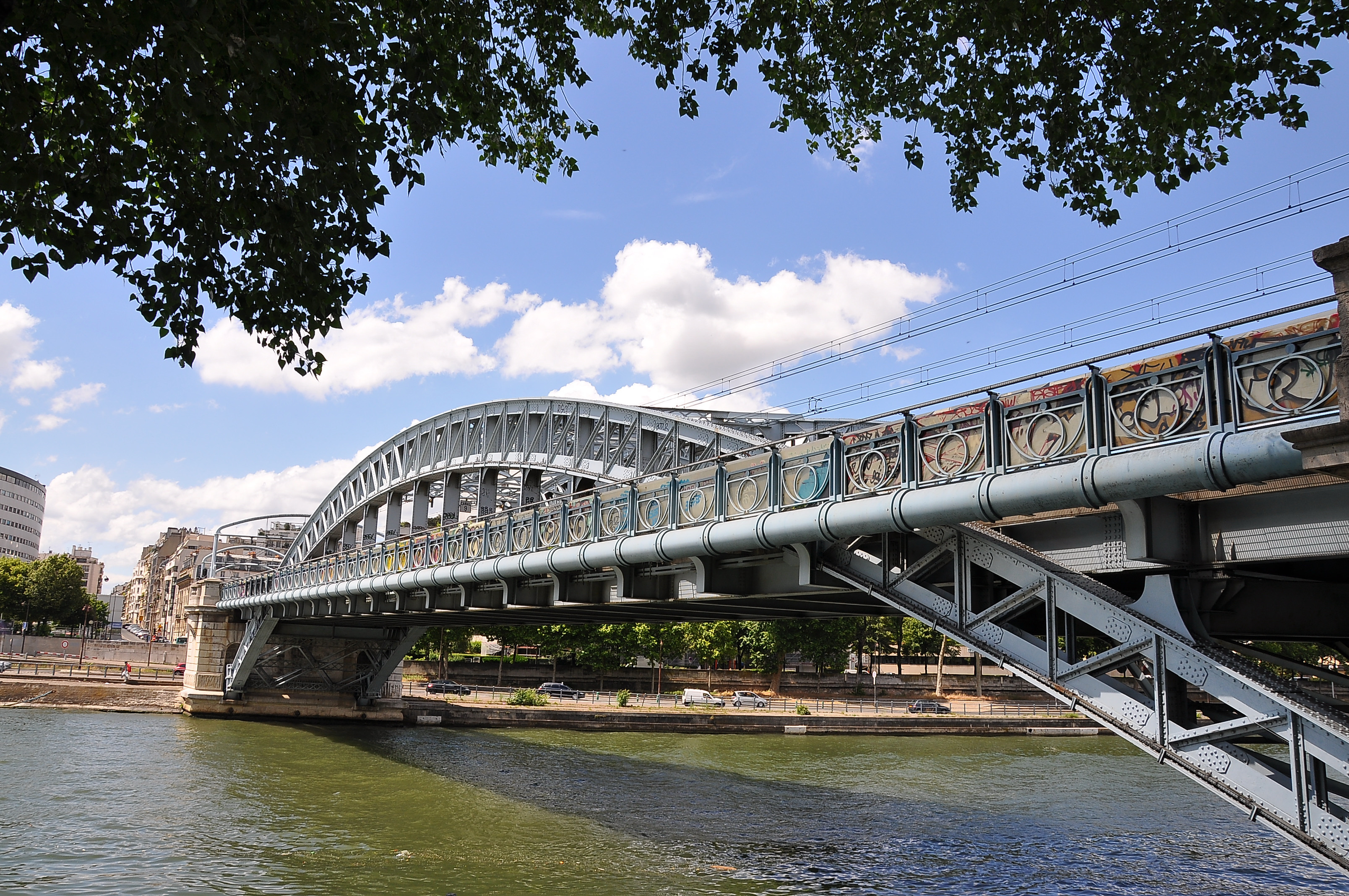
Bridge crossing the right arm of Seine River.

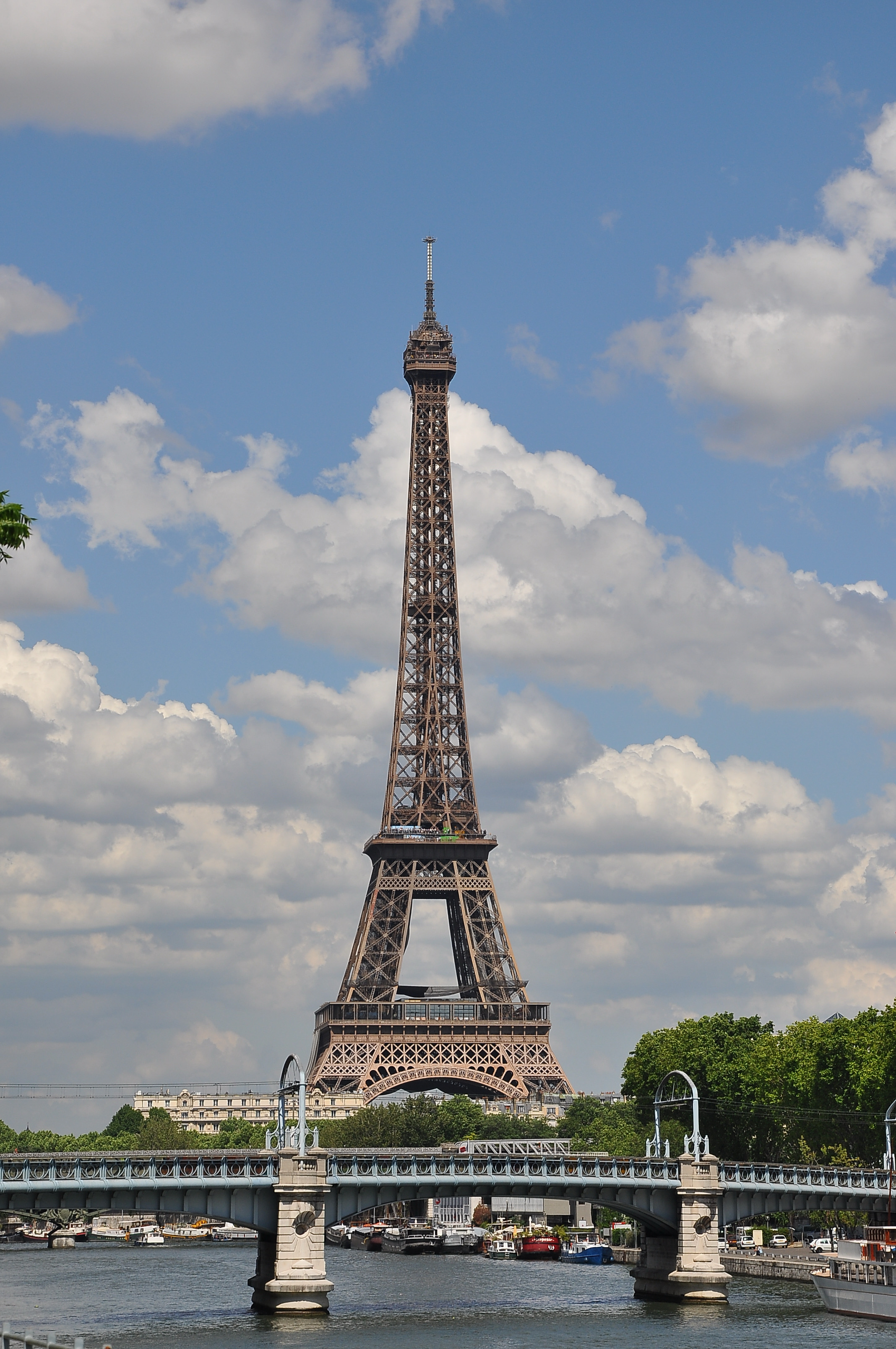
Remote view with Eiffel Tower.

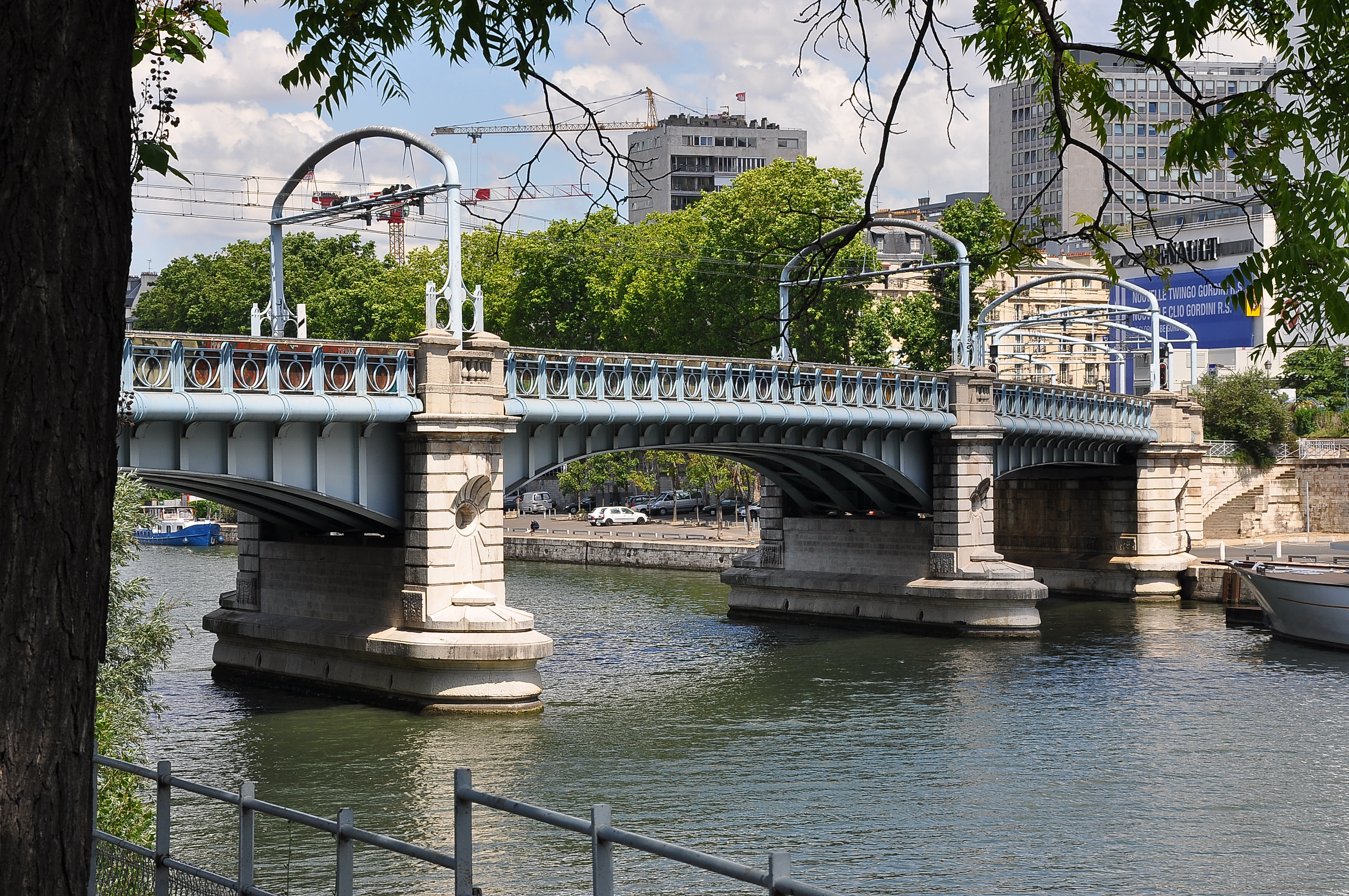
View of the bridge over the left arm of river.

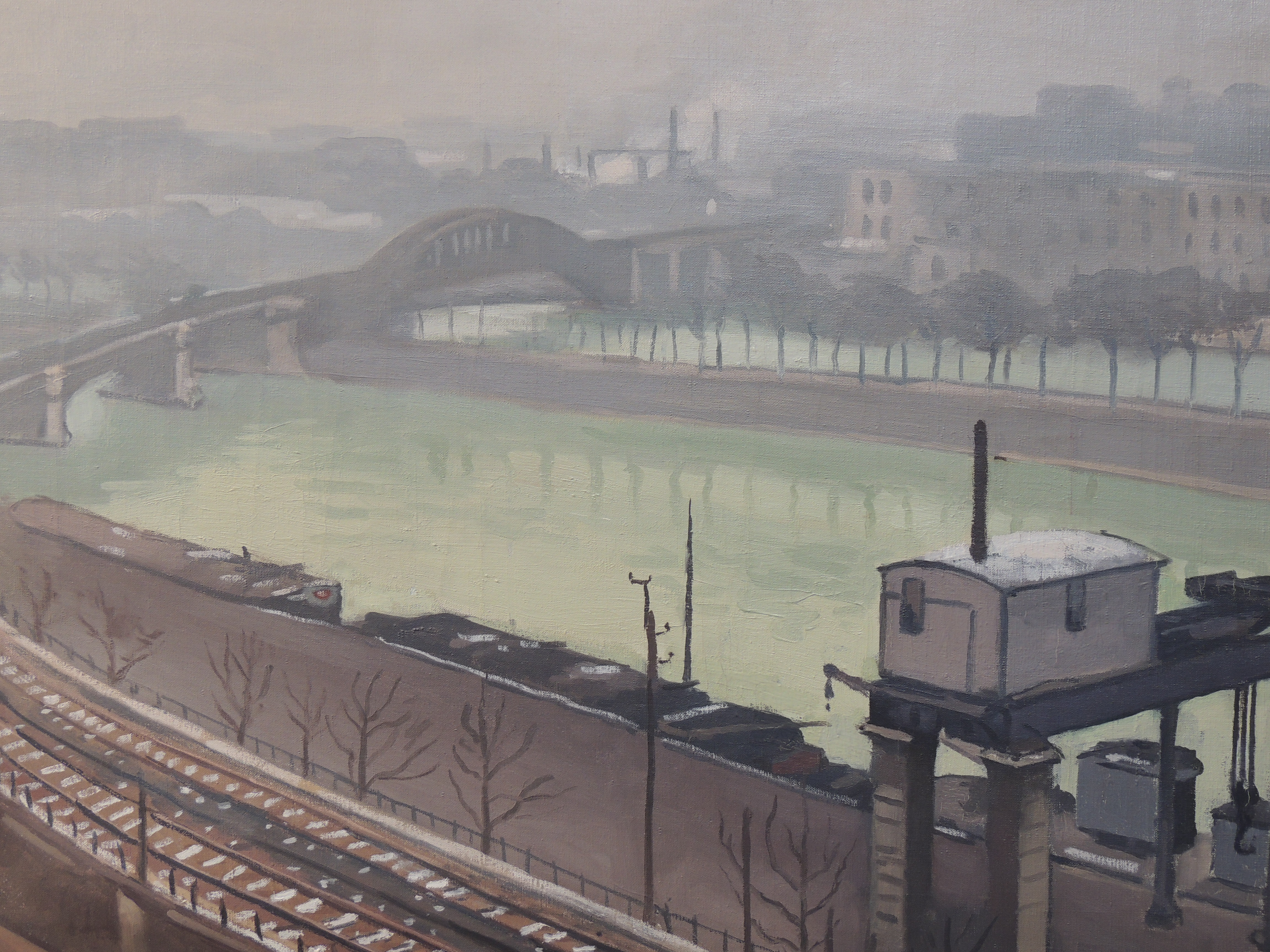
Albert Marquet, La Seine à Grenelle, 1922 painting

Location on the Seine
