= Île aux Cygnes =

Artificial river island in Paris, France

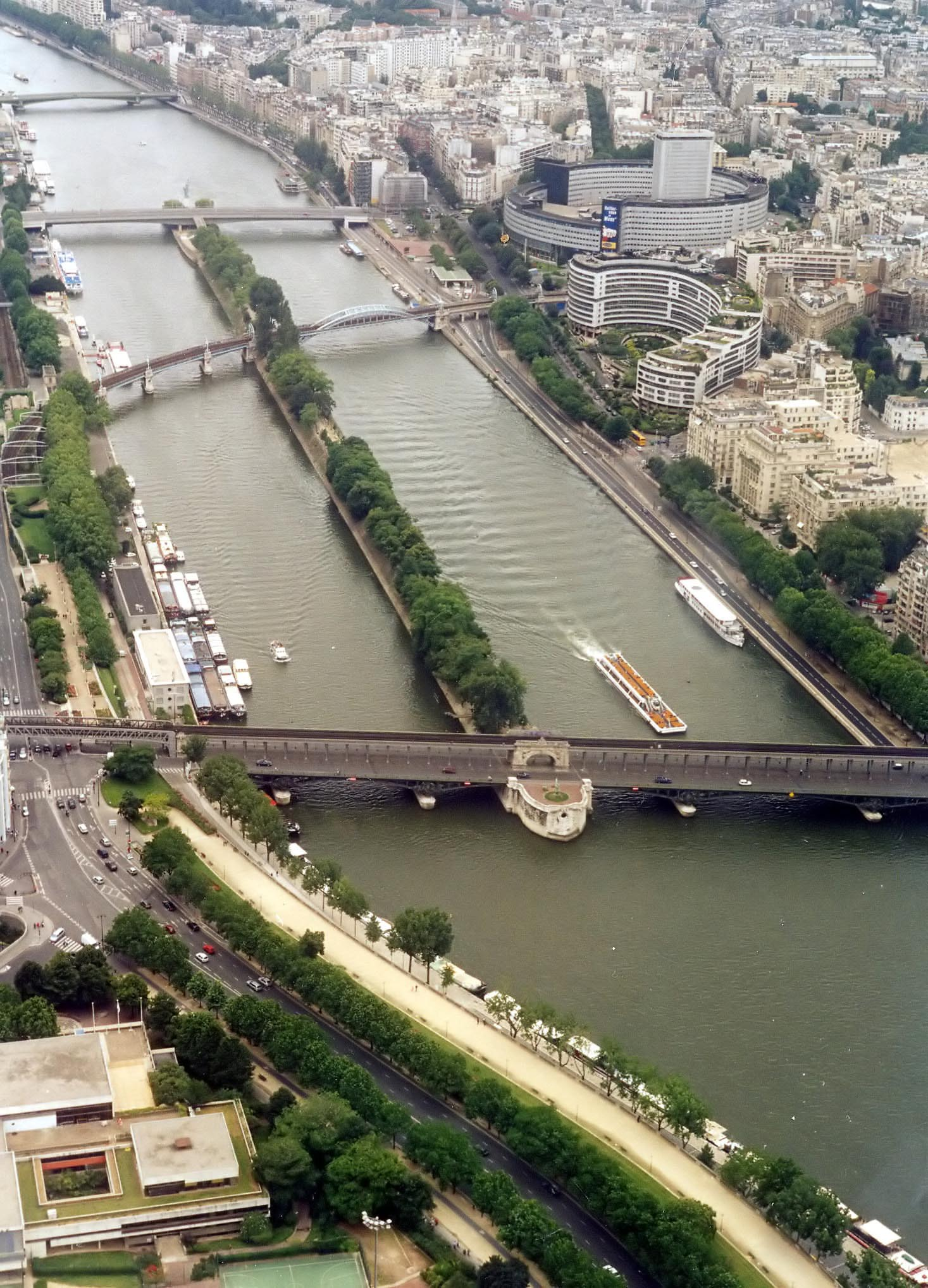
- The Île aux Cygnes as viewed from the top of the Eiffel Tower. The Statue of Liberty replica is just visible at the far end.

- Location within Paris

Geography
- Location: Paris, France
- Coordinates: 48°51′10.03″N 2°17′00.95″E
- Area: 0.013 km^{2} (0.0050 sq mi)

Administration
- France

Île aux Cygnes (French: [il o siɲ]; English: Isle of the Swans) is a small artificial island on the river Seine in Paris, France, in the 15th arrondissement. It was created in 1827 to protect the bridge named the Pont de Grenelle. It should not be confused with an earlier Île des Cygnes that was attached to the Champ de Mars in the late 18th century.

The uninhabited island is 850 metres (2,789 ft) long and 11 metres (36 ft) at its widest point, making it the third-largest island in Paris. A tree-lined walkway, named L'Allée des Cygnes (Path of Swans), runs the length of the island. Since 2012, there has been a public workout space with bicycles and a climbing wall underneath the Pont de Grenelle, close to a Statue of Liberty replica.

The island is crossed by three bridges: the Pont de Grenelle, the Pont Rouelle and the Pont de Bir-Hakeim. It is served by the Passy and Bir-Hakeim Métro stations.

Map of Île aux Cygnes

== Statue of Liberty replica ==
A notable feature is a quarter-scale replica of Frédéric Auguste Bartholdi's Liberty Enlightening the World, commonly known as the Statue of Liberty on the Île aux Cygnes. The replica is 11.50 meters (37 feet 9 inches) tall and faces west in the direction of its larger rendition in New York City. Inaugurated by President Marie François Sadi Carnot on 4 July 1889, nearly three years after its US counterpart, it was donated to the city by the Parisian expatriate community in the US. A restoration project in 1986 marked the centennial of the original (as stated on the plaque).

The statue originally faced east, toward the Eiffel Tower, but it was turned west in 1937 for the world's fair hosted in Paris that year. At its base is a commemorative plaque, and the tablet in its left hand bears the inscription IV Juillet 1776 = XIV Juillet 1789, recognizing the American Independence Day and the French Bastille Day.

In 1998 to celebrate the "Year of France in Japan", the 14-ton statue was transported to Japan and displayed on Odaiba, an artificial island in Tokyo Bay, before returning to Paris the following year. The statue was used as a plot point in the 1988 film Frantic, the 2007 film National Treasure: Book of Secrets and the 2016 film Lost in Paris.

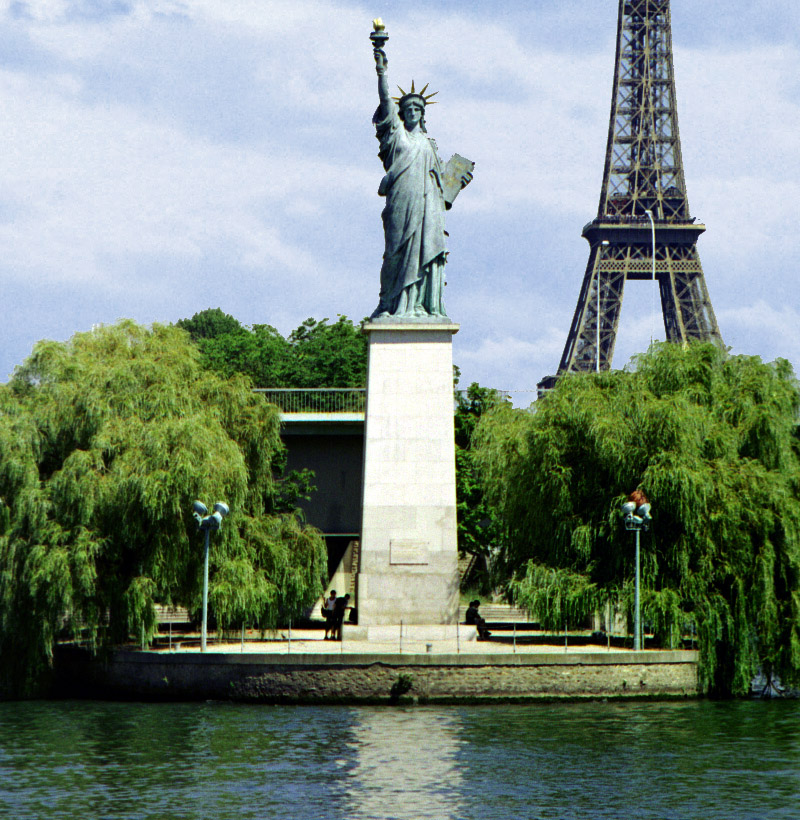
The replica Liberty Enlightening the World (Statue of Liberty)

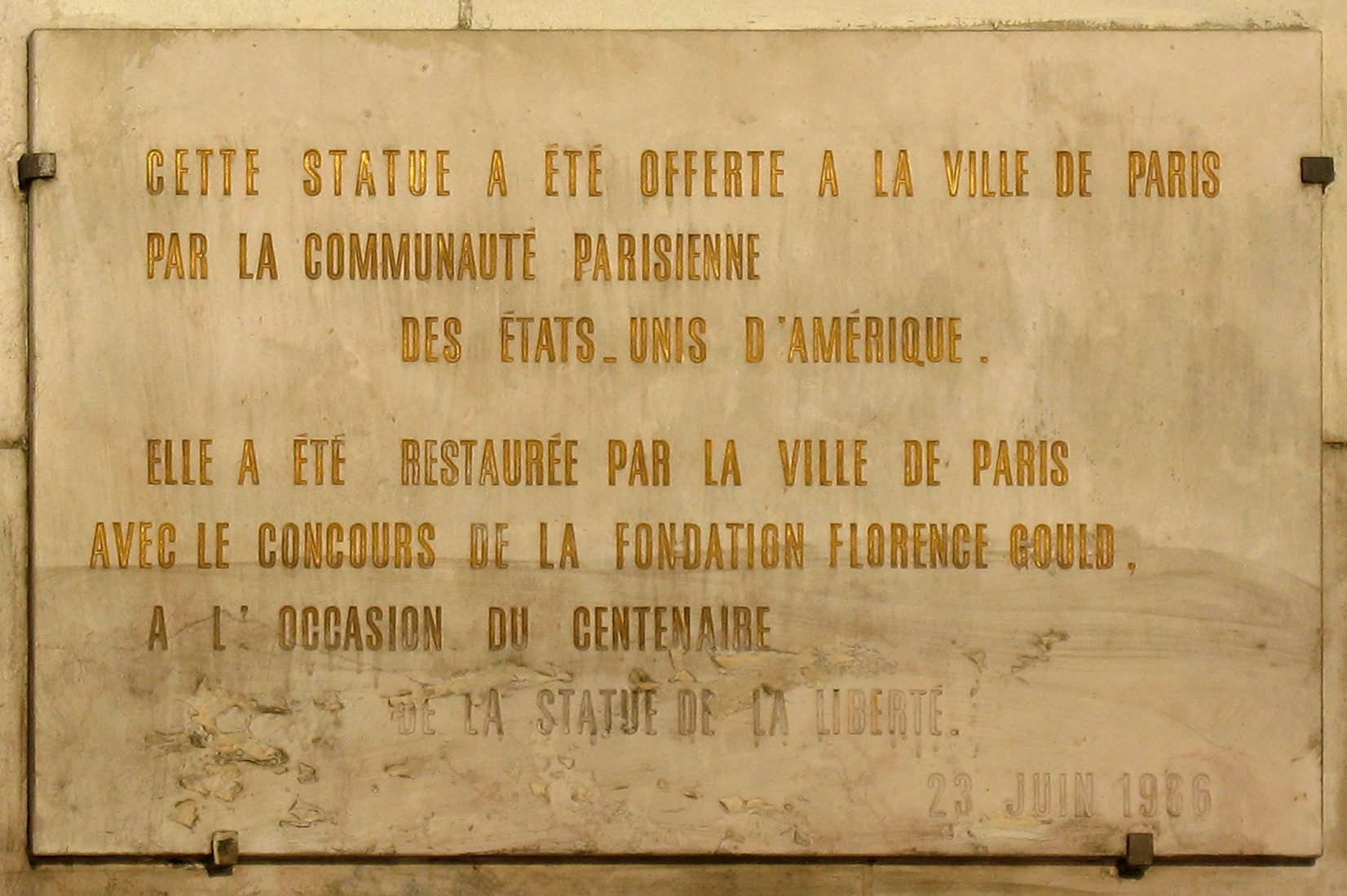
Plaque on statue
