= Pont de Bir-Hakeim =

Bridge in Paris, France

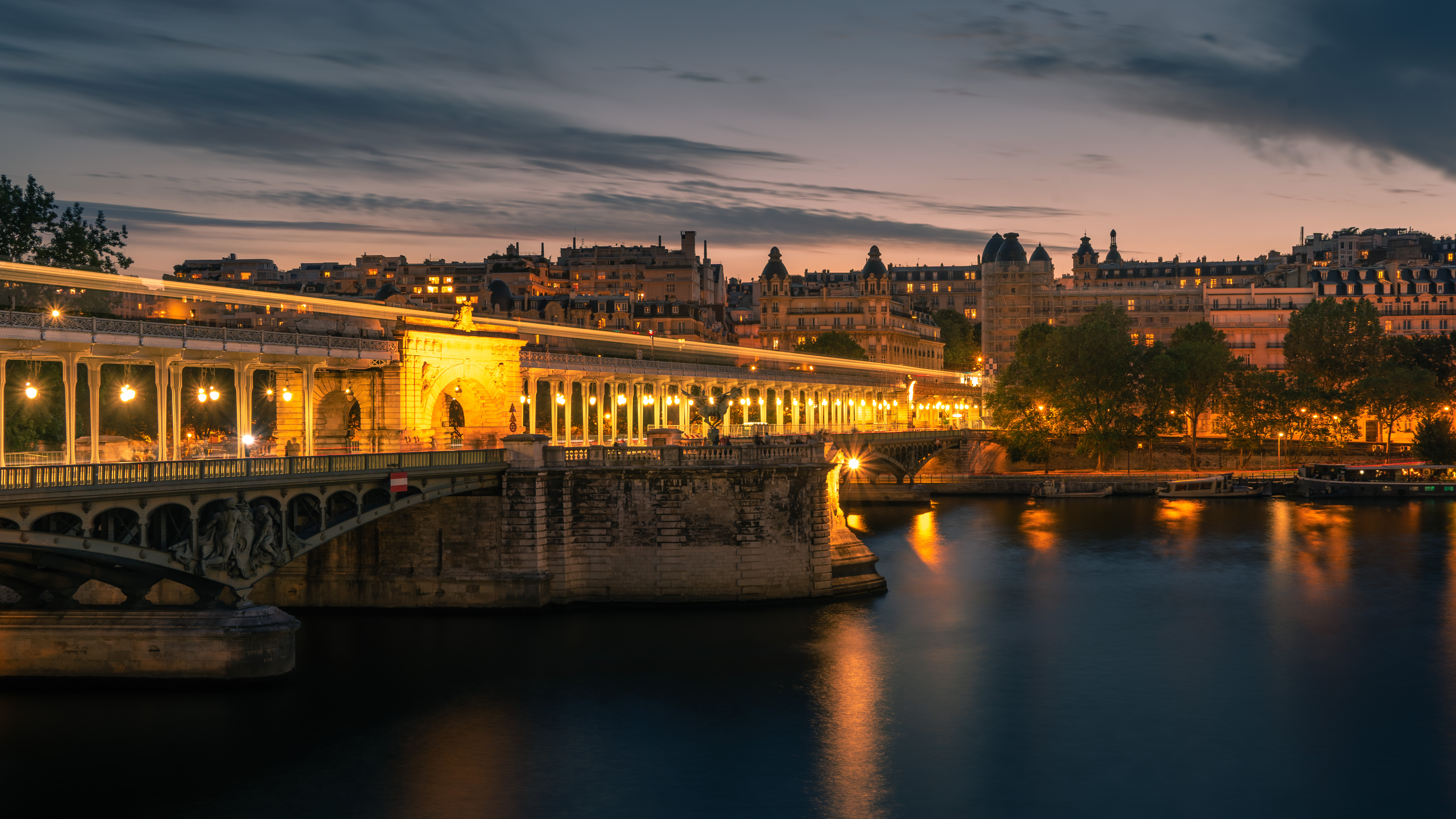
- The west part of the bridge at night
- Coordinates: 48°51′20″N 2°17′16″E
- Crosses: Seine
- Locale: Paris, France
- Next upstream: Pont d'Iéna
- Next downstream: Pont Rouelle

Characteristics
- Total length: 237 metres (778 ft)
- Width: 24.7 metres (81 ft)

Location
- Interactive map of Pont de Bir-Hakeim

The Pont de Bir-Hakeim (French: [pɔ̃ d(ə) biʁakɛm]; English: Bir Hakeim Bridge), is a steel open spandrel deck arch bridge on stone masonry starlings, which crosses the Seine in Paris, France. The bridge is named after the 1942 battle in Libya; until 1948 it was known as the Pont de Passy ([pɔ̃ d(ə) pasi]; Passy Bridge). The Pont de Bir-Hakeim connects the 15th and 16th arrondissements, passing over the northeast end of the Île aux Cygnes (Isle of the Swans).

The bridge, made of steel, was constructed between 1903 and 1905, in replacement of a footbridge that had been erected in 1878. The bridge has two levels: one for motor vehicles and pedestrians, the other being a rail viaduct (the Viaduc de Passy) built above the first one, through which passes Line 6 of the Paris Métro. The bridge is 237 metres (778 ft) long and 24.7 metres (81 ft) wide. The part crossing the Grand Bras ('great anabranch') of the Seine (west from the island) is slightly longer than the one crossing the Petit Bras ('small anabranch').

== History ==
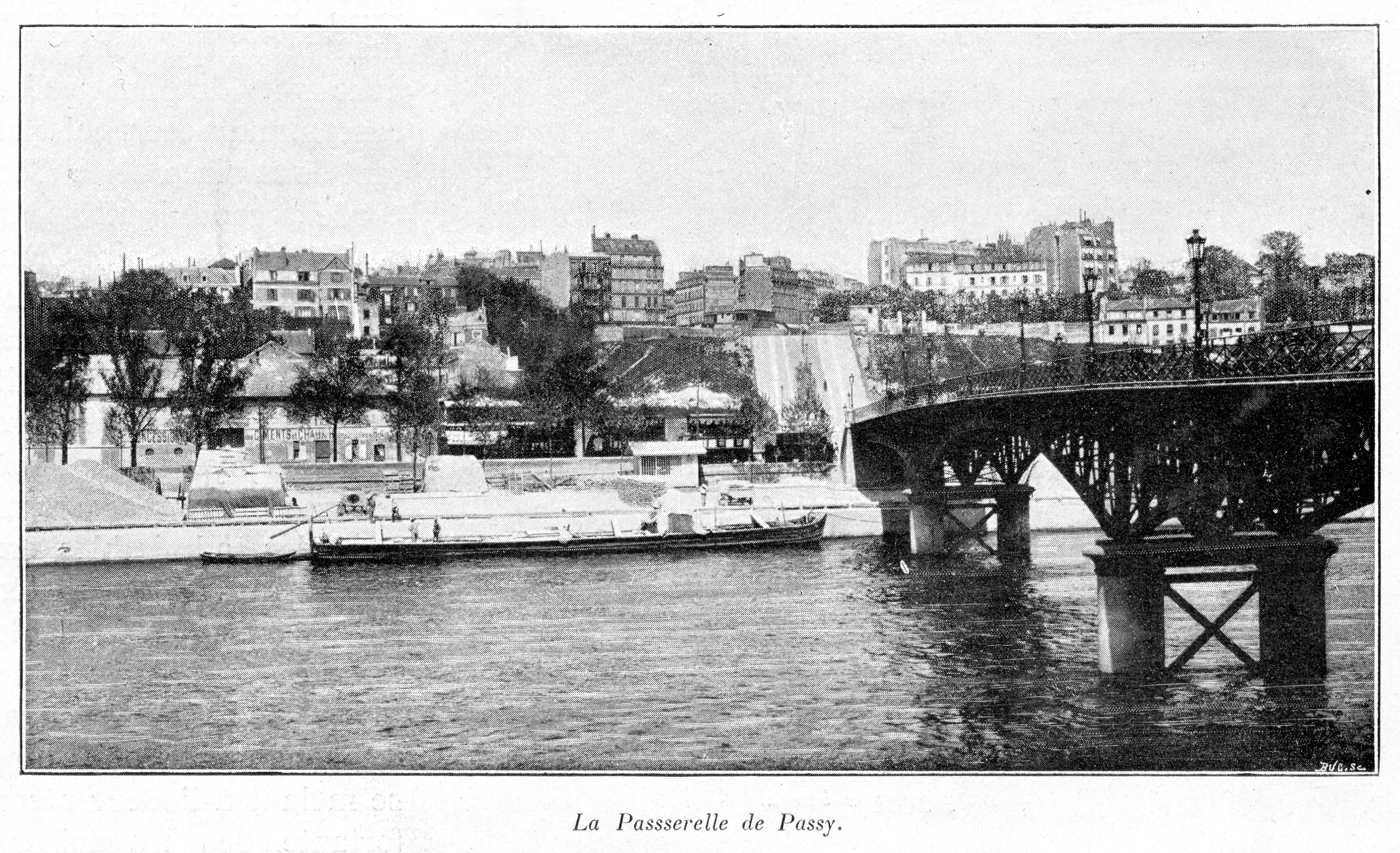
The Passerelle de Passy (photograph of 1897)

The bridge was built in replacement of the Passerelle de Passy (Passy Footbridge) which dated from the Exposition Universelle of 1878. A contest for the metallic structure of the new bridge was organized between 8 November 1902 and 14 January 1903. The Passerelle was moved downstream by 30 meters before the construction of the bridge started, in order to provide a crossing of the river during construction of the new bridge. The moving of the Passerelle took place on 20 and 21 August 1903; on 22, the Passerelle was tested for safety, and on 23 it was reopened to circulation. The Passerelle would only be demolished after completion of the bridge in 1905. Construction of the new bridge was made under the direction of Louis Biette, by Daydé & Pillé.

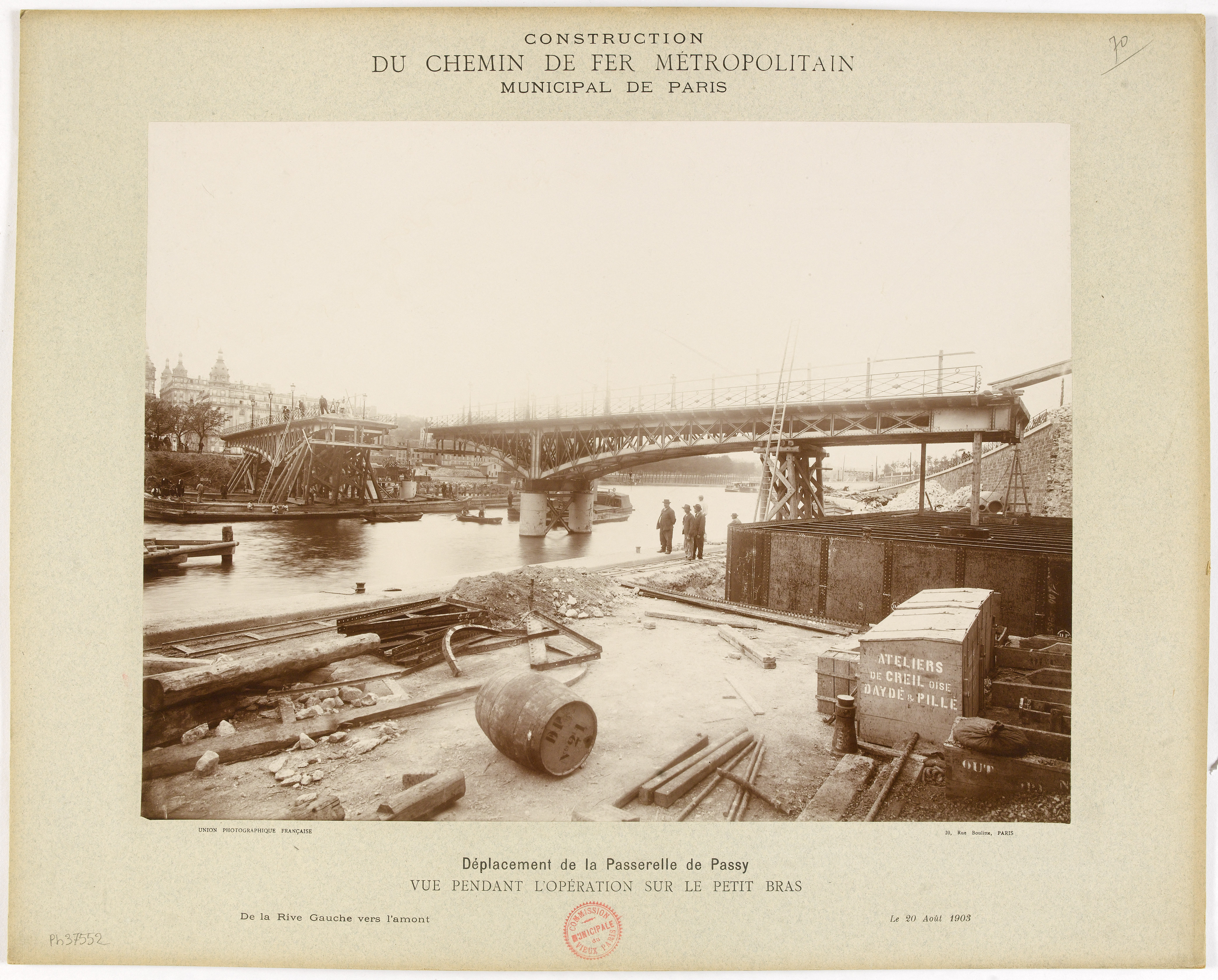
Moving of the Passerelle downstream in 1903 before construction of the new bridge

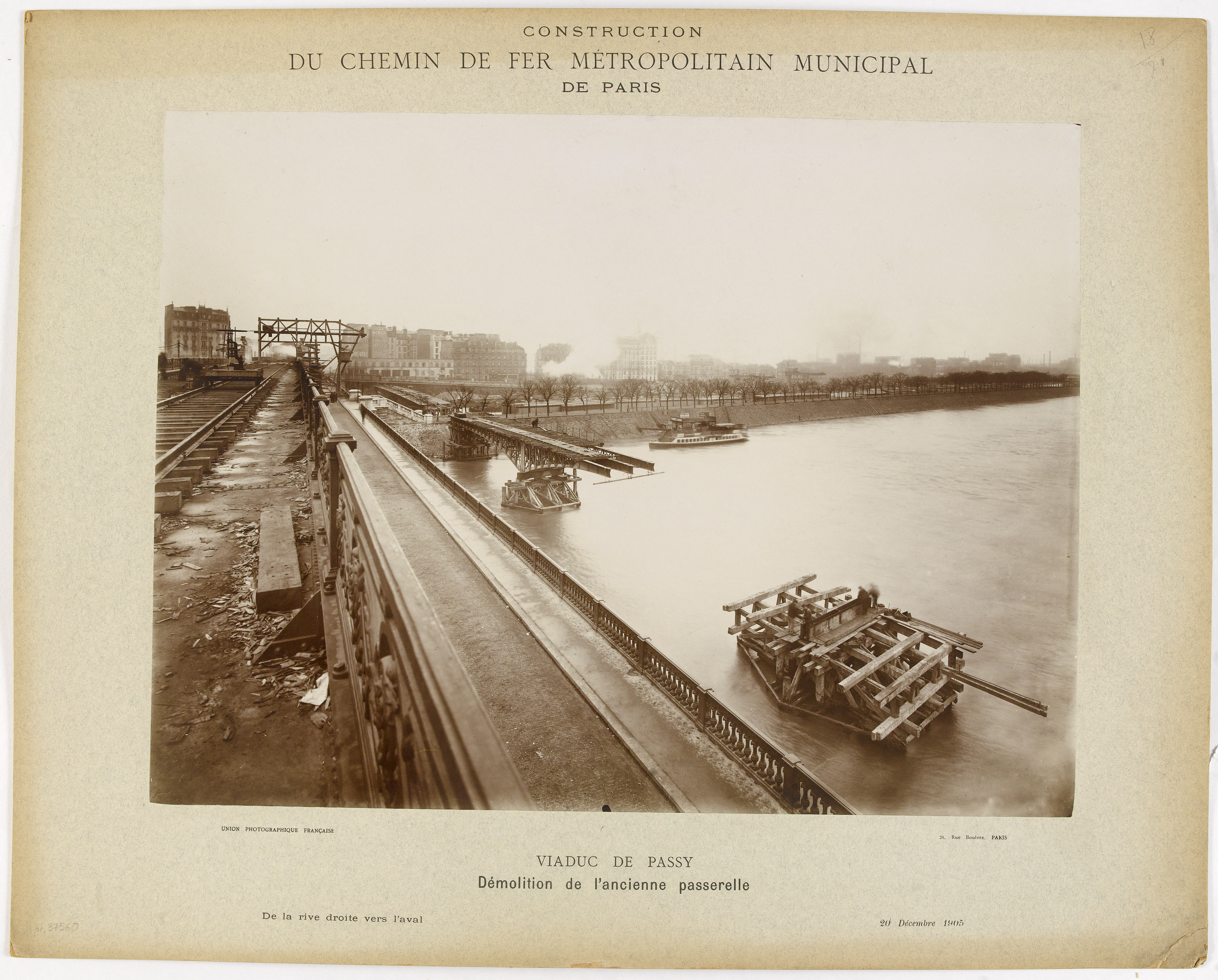
Demolition of the Passerelle in 1905, as seen from the new bridge's viaduct

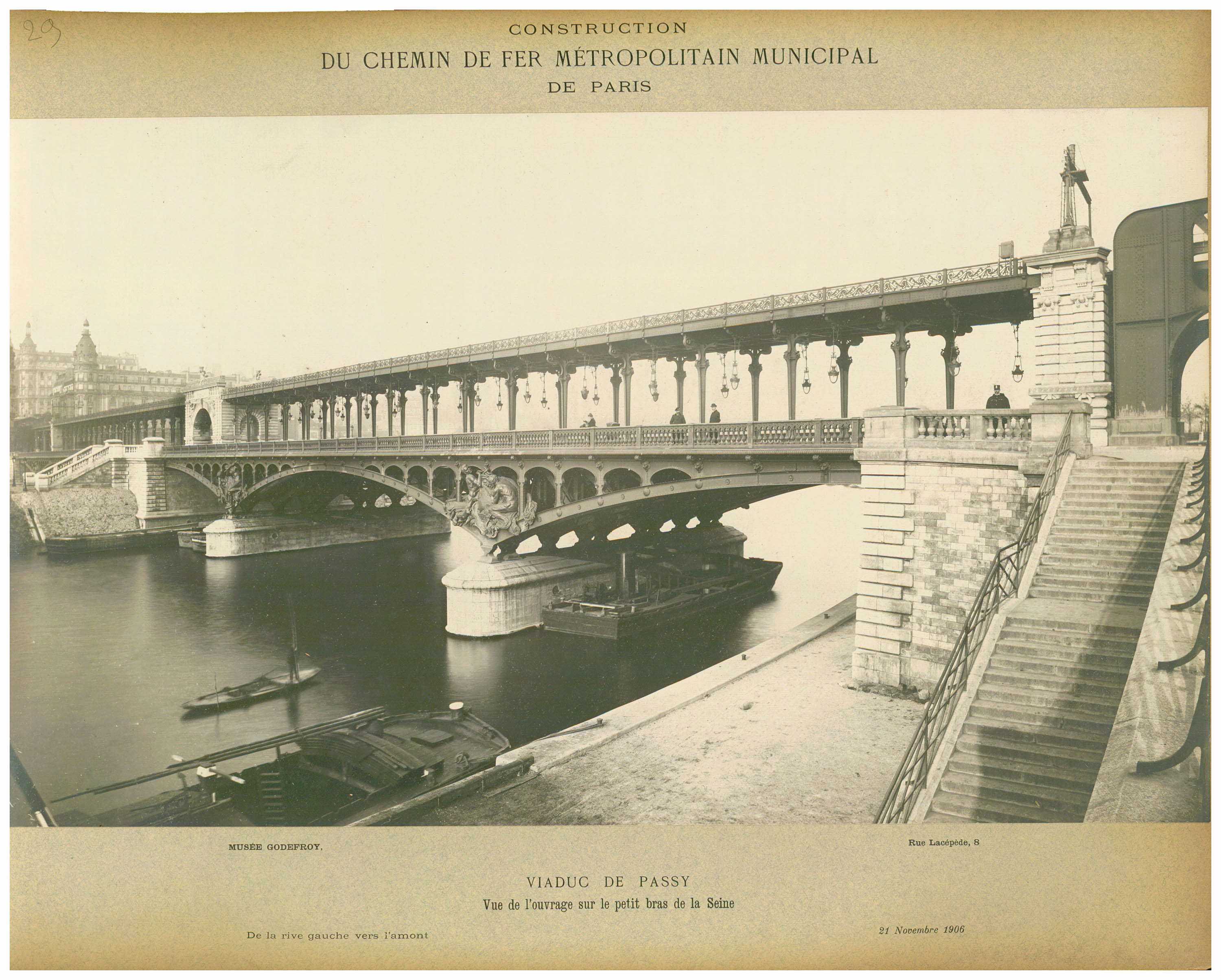
The new bridge over the Petit Bras, photographed in 1906

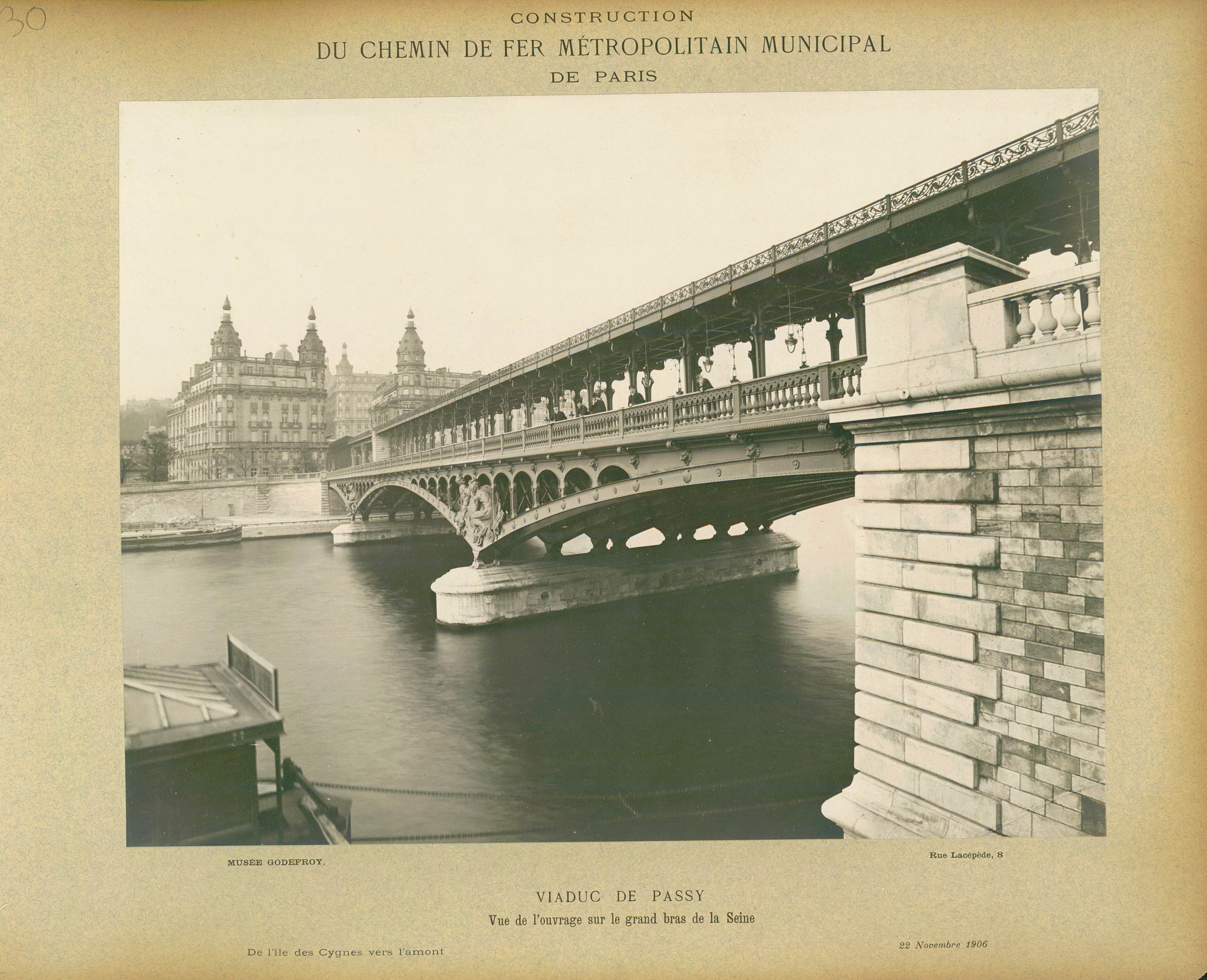
The new bridge over the Grand Bras, photographed in 1906

The bridge was decorated by Jean-Camille Formigé, who also designed the Viaduc d'Austerlitz, the Jardin des Serres d'Auteuil, as well as the park below the Sacré-Cœur. (Note: He also restored the Roman amphitheatre in Arles and the Roman theatre in Orange.)

Originally named the Pont de Passy (after the former commune of Passy, which it reaches), it was renamed in 1948 to commemorate the Battle of Bir Hakeim, fought by Free French forces against the German Afrika Korps in 1942.

== Structure ==
Location on the Seine

The bridge is in fact composed of two independent structures joining at Île aux Cygnes, each having two half-arches and a central arch, measuring respectively 30 metres (98 ft), 54 metres (177 ft) and 30 metres (98 ft) over the Grand Bras and 24 metres (79 ft), 42 metres (138 ft) and 24 metres (79 ft) over the Petit Bras. The road level of the bridge extends out in a belvedere where it passes over the Île aux Cygnes which covers the north-eastern end of the island. Here stands a statue named La France renaissante.

The railway viaduct is supported by metal colonnades, except where it passes over the Île aux Cygnes, where it rests on a masonry arch. Many commemorative plates decorate the viaduct bridge, including several dedicated to soldiers fallen in Belgium during the Second World War. In addition, the central arch of the viaduct, at the level of the island, is decorated with four monumental stone statues in high-relief: figures of Science and Labour by Jules-Felix Coutan, Electricity and Commerce by Jean Antoine Injalbert.

== Popular culture ==
Many movies have featured the bridge, including Rififi, Ascenseur pour l'échafaud, Zazie dans le Métro, Last Tango in Paris, Peur sur la ville, National Treasure: Book of Secrets, Ronin and Inception. A music video for Ayumi Hamasaki's 10th anniversary single "Mirrorcle World" was also filmed here.

== Gallery ==
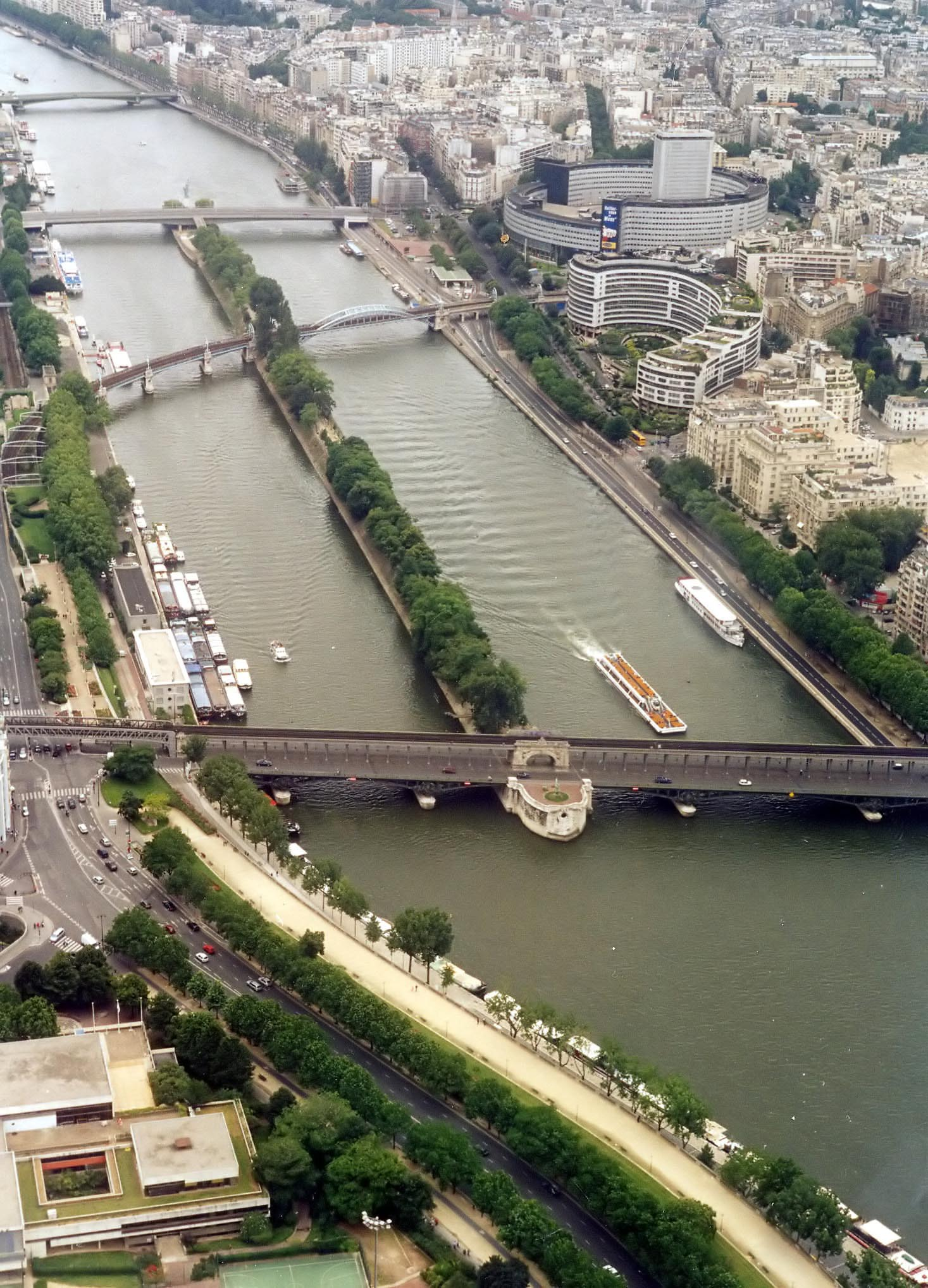
The Pont de Bir-Hakeim is located at the northern tip of the Île aux Cygnes.

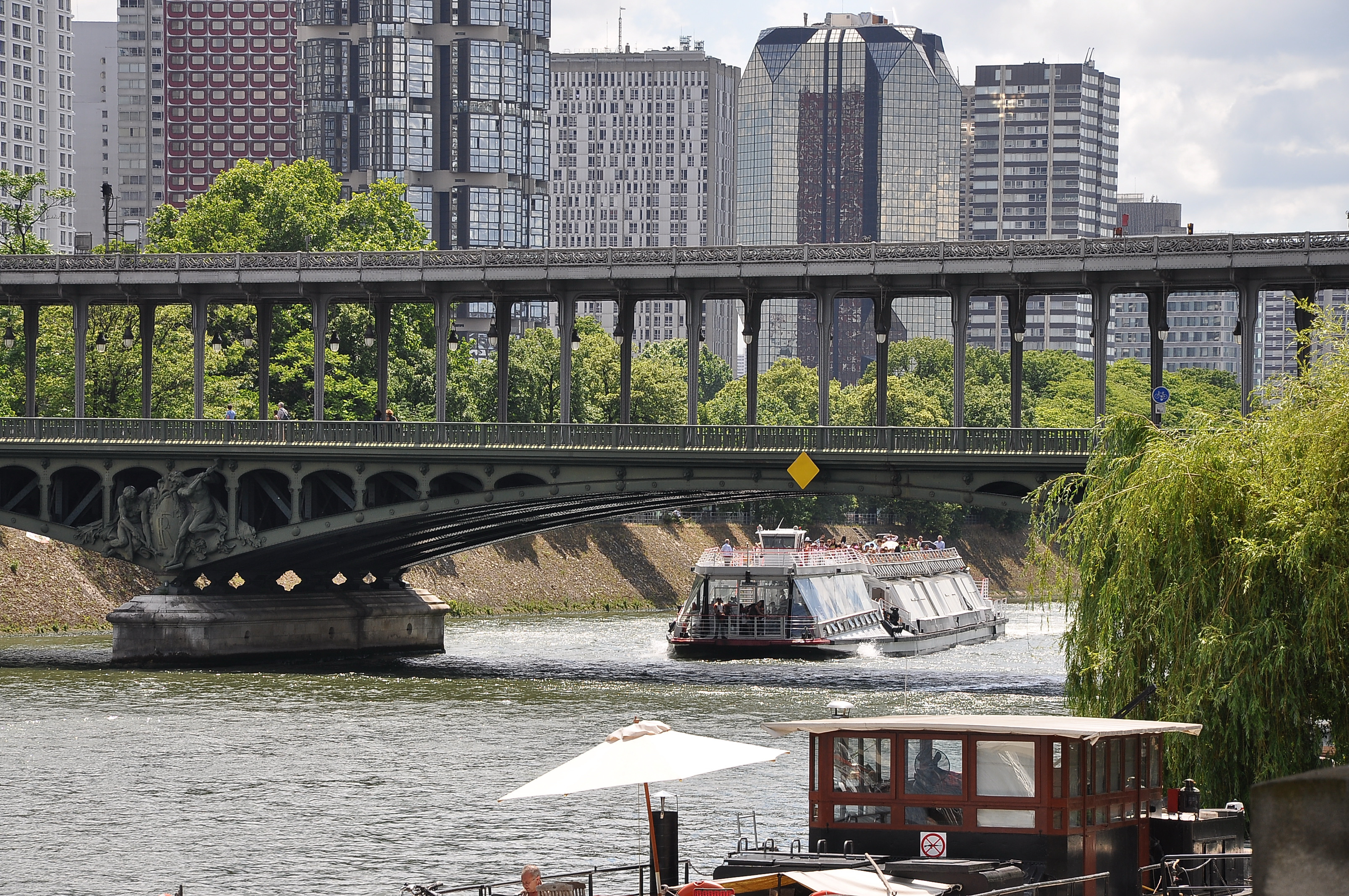
View of bridge from the Île aux Cygnes

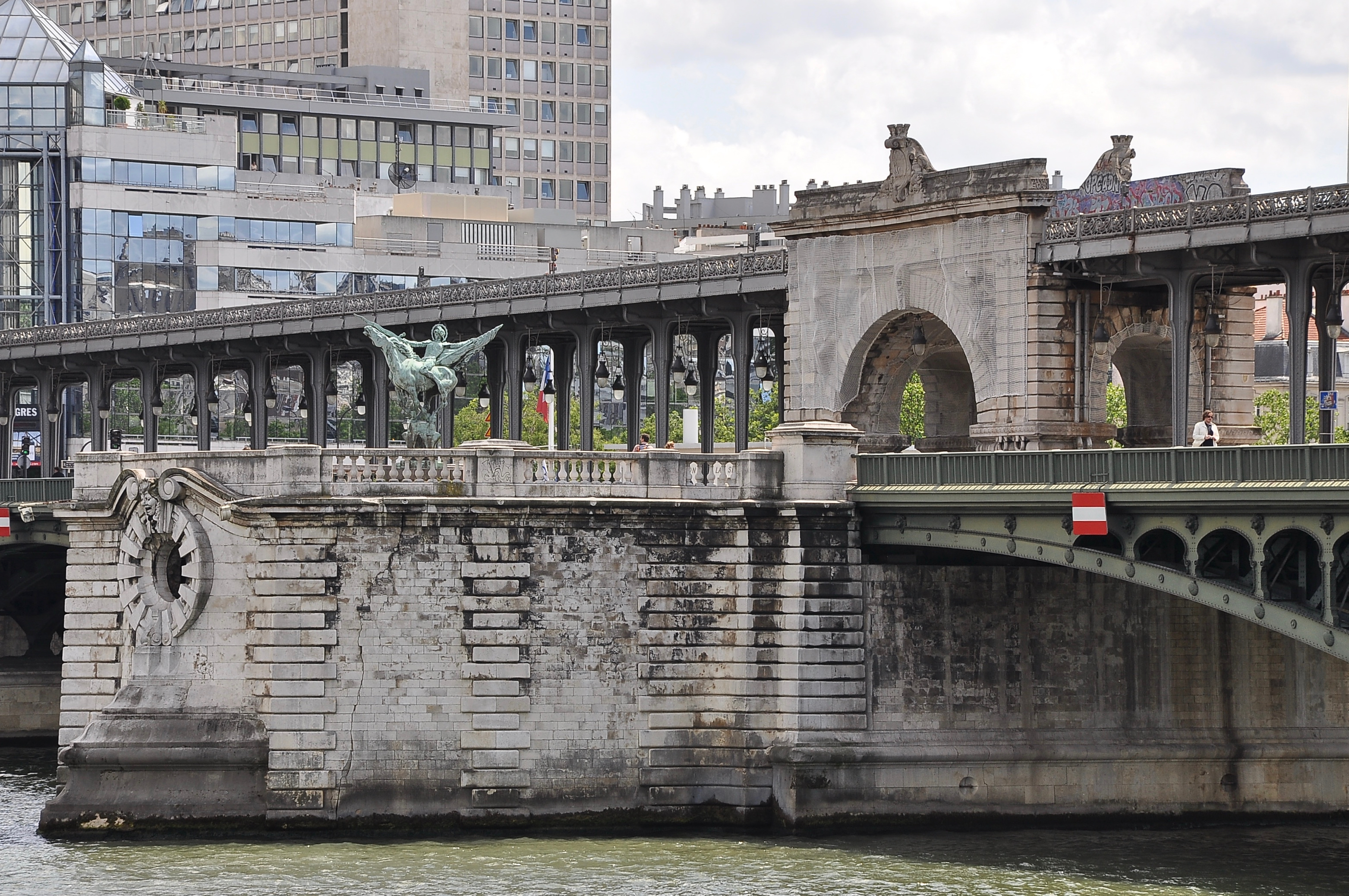
The central arch with the statue La France renaissante of Holger Wederkinch

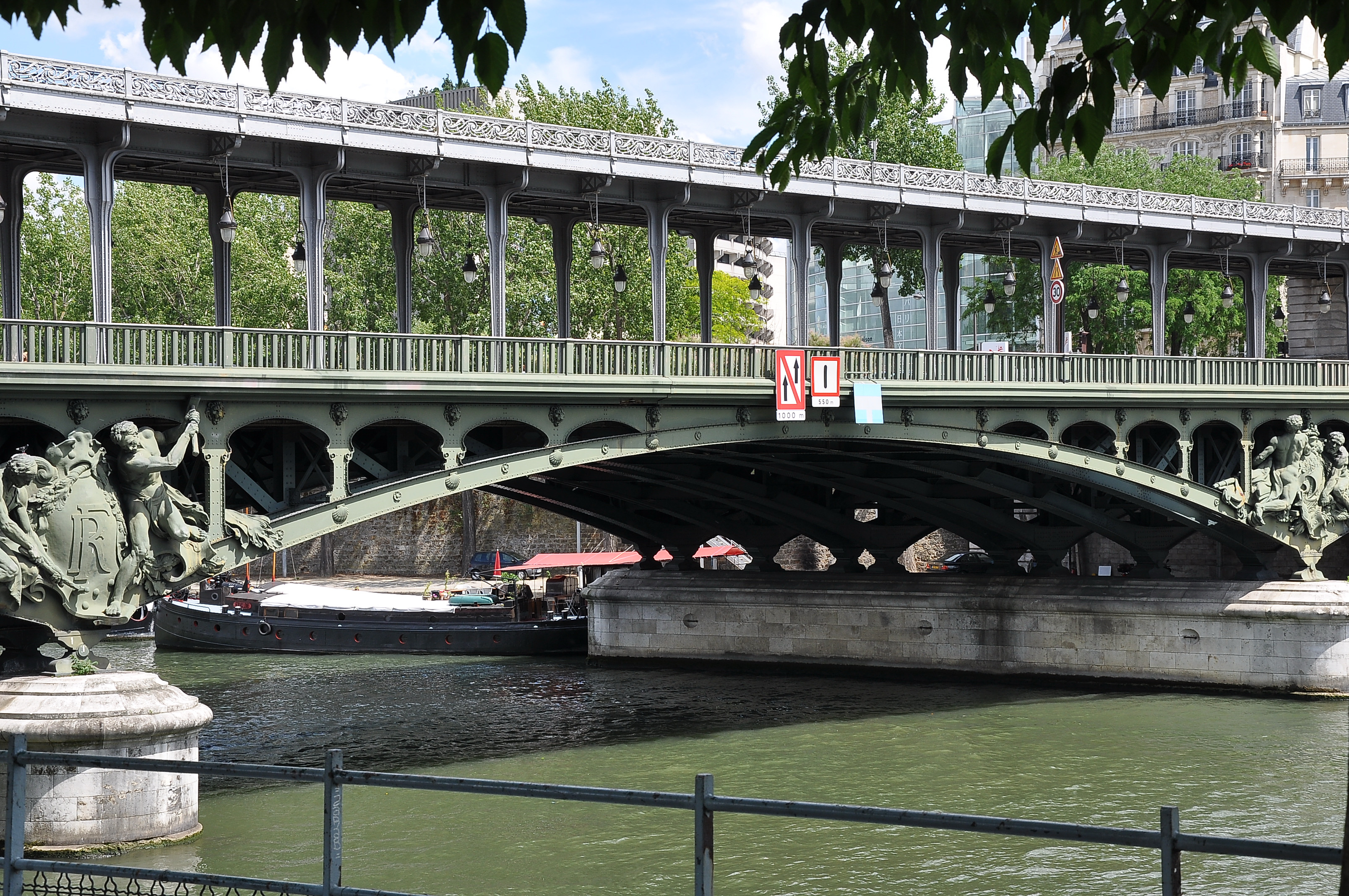
The iron sculptures of Gustave Michel

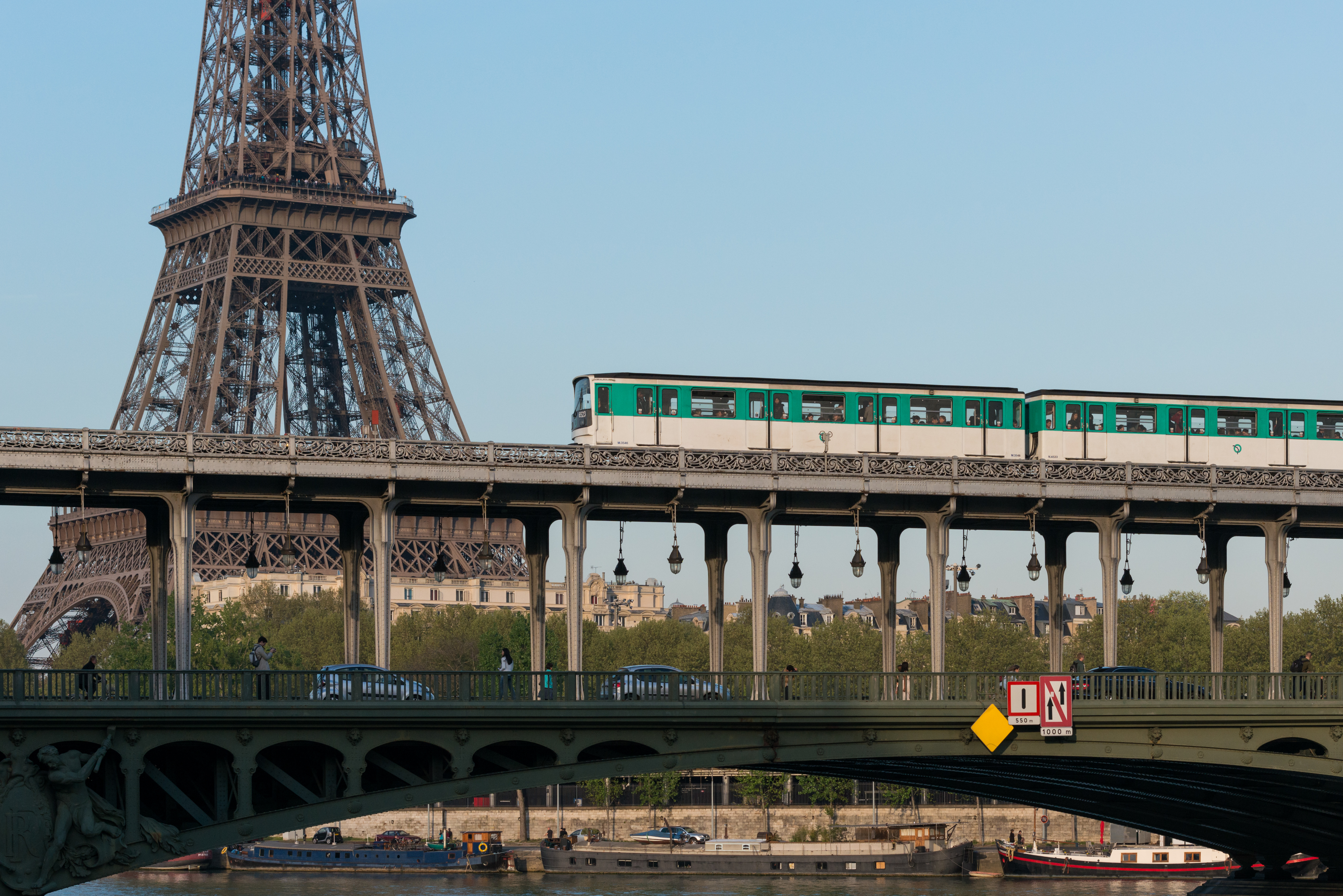
Métro Line 6 crossing the Seine on the Pont de Bir-Hakeim, Eiffel Tower in the background

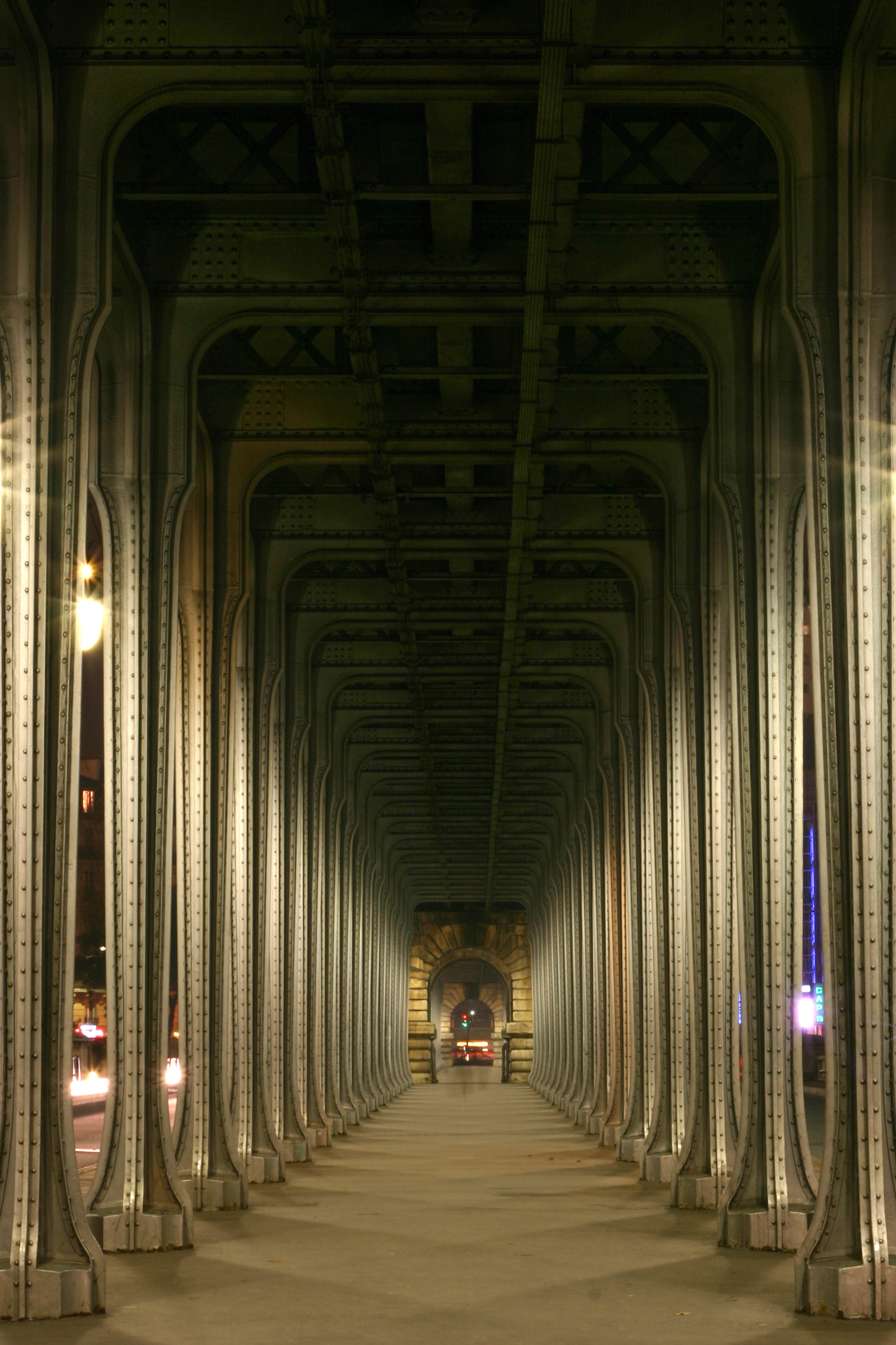
Colonnade of the viaduct

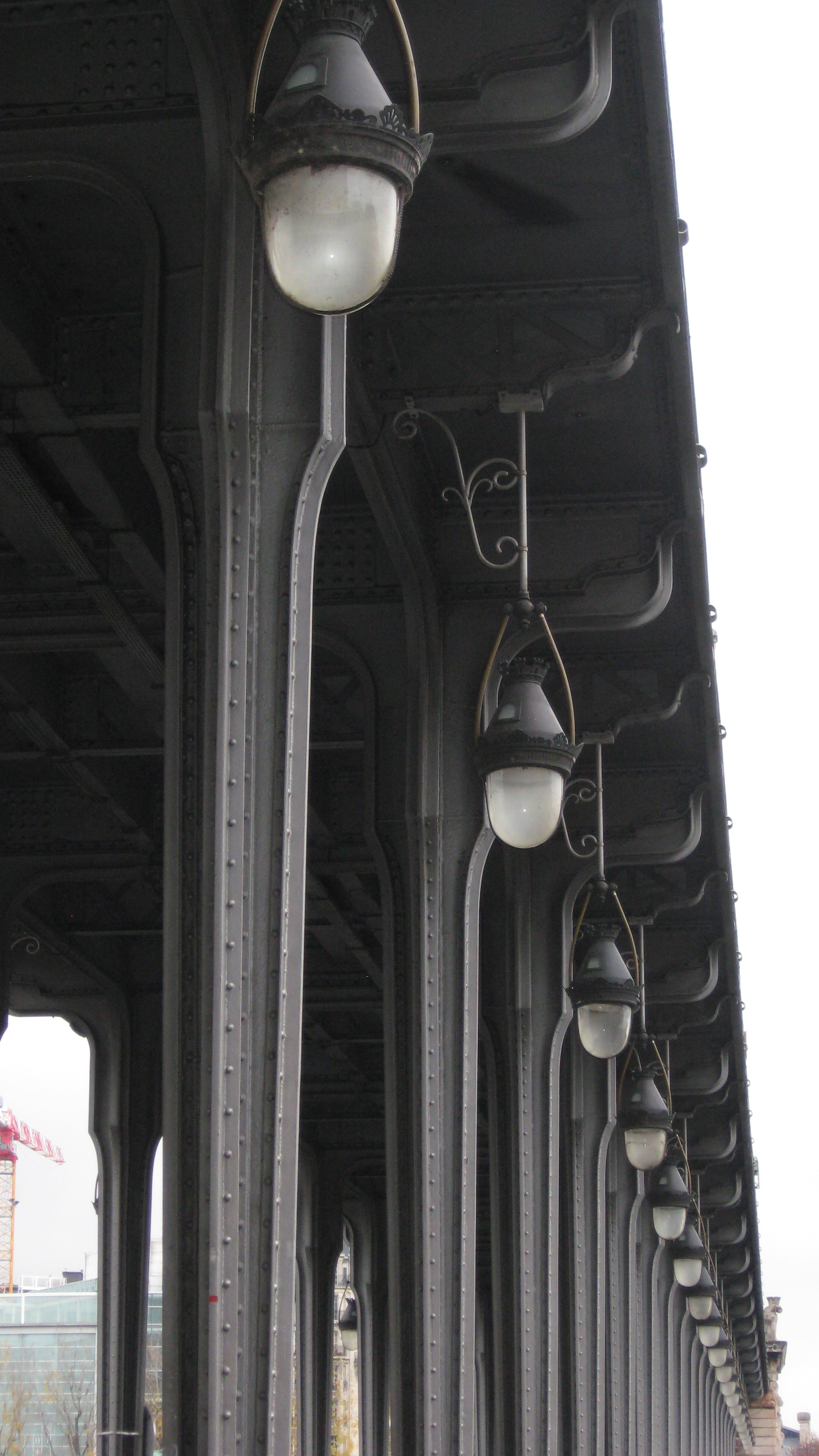
Street lights and colonnade

== See also ==
- List of works by Jean Antoine Injalbert
- List of crossings of the Seine
- Pont de Bercy - Another double deck arch bridge crossing the Seine in Paris
