= Pont de Grenelle =

Bridge in Paris, France

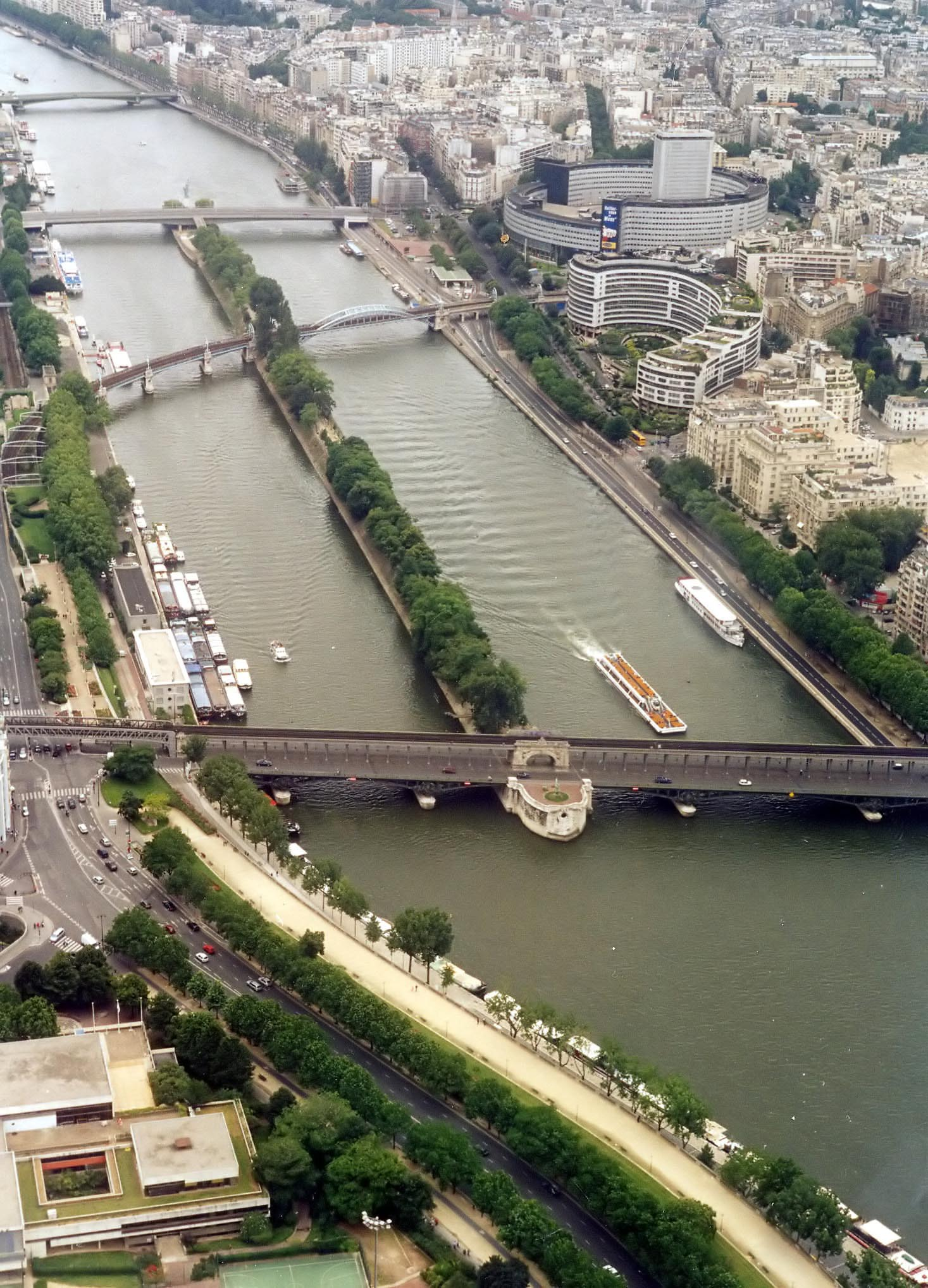
- The pont de Grenelle is the second bridge from the top, passing through the southern tip of the Île aux Cygnes.
- Coordinates: 48°51′01″N 2°16′48″E
- Crosses: The Seine River
- Locale: Paris, France
- Next upstream: Pont Rouelle
- Next downstream: Pont Mirabeau

Location
- Interactive map of Pont de Grenelle

The Pont de Grenelle-Cadets de Saumur (French pronunciation: [pɔ̃ də ɡʁənɛl kadɛ də somyʁ]), formerly known as Pont de Grenelle (English: Grenelle Bridge. "Cadets de Saumur" is the name of the students of the Saumur Cavalry School) is a bridge that crosses the Seine River in Paris, France. It connects the city's 15th and 16th arrondissements, and passes through the Île aux Cygnes. Constructed of steel, it is a girder bridge. The current bridge was constructed in 1966-68. It replaced an iron bridge that had stood since 1875. which had replaced the original wooden tollbridge built in 1827-29. The bridge passes behind a replica of the Statue of Liberty.

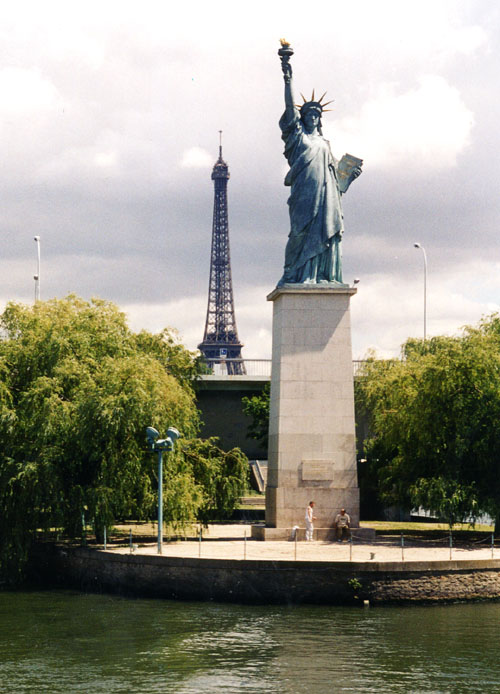
The bridge can be seen behind the replica of the Statue of Liberty.

== Origin of the name ==
The bridge's original name came from the town and plain of Grenelle on its Left Bank end. Grenelle was a town in the Seine department from 1830, and became a part of Paris's 15th arrondissement in 1860.

On 18 June 2016, the bridge was renamed the "Pont de Grenelle-Cadets-de-Saumur" to honor the students of the Cavalry School who defended the Loire region in the Battle of Saumur that took place in June 1940.

Location on the Seine
