= Gustave Michel =

French artist

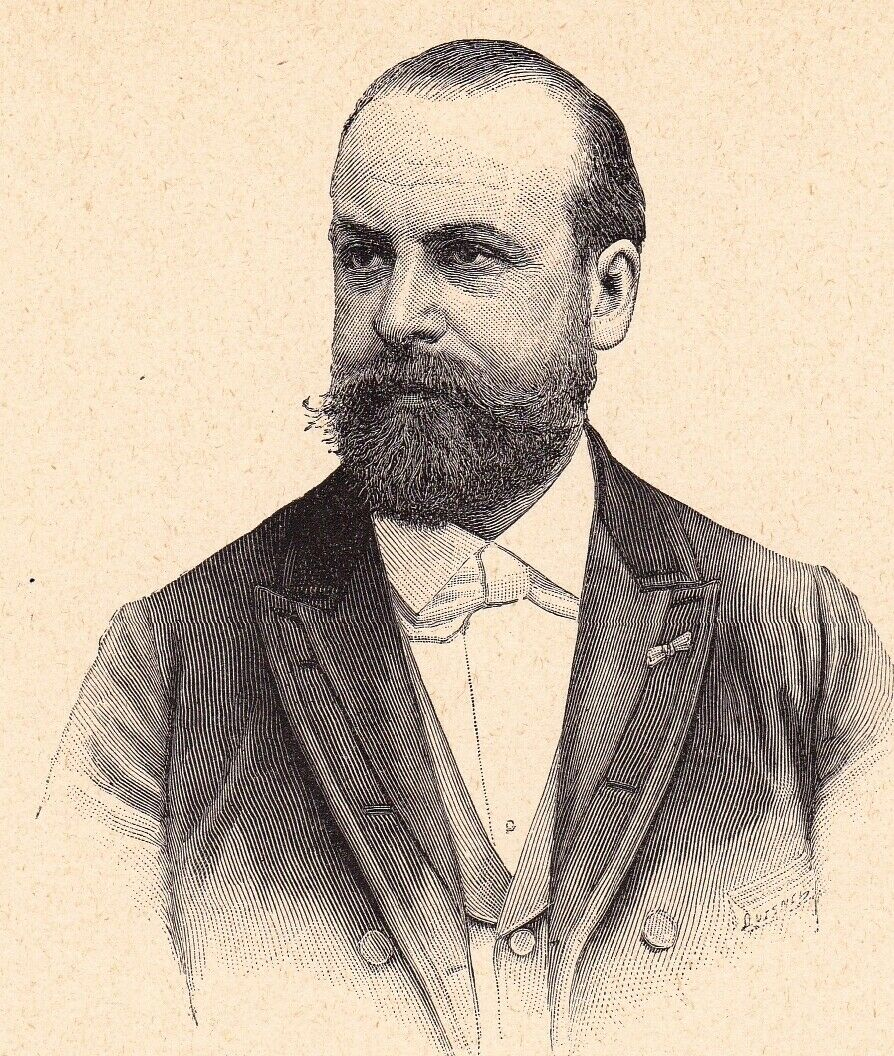
Gustave Michel

Gustave Frédéric Michel (French pronunciation: [ɡystav fʁedeʁik miʃɛl]; 1851–1924) was a French sculptor, and medallist, according to Marina Warner "one of the most famous sculptors of the first decades of this (twentieth) century in France," although virtually unknown today. He also taught sculpture; among his pupils was the American Edith Howland.

== Works ==
- Monument commemorating the French Revolution, Châtellerault (Vienna), 1890
- two figural groups on the supports of Pont de Bir-Hakeim in Paris, circa 1900
- Monument to Jules Ferry and Autumn, the Jardin des Tuileries in Paris, 1910
- 1924 Medal Occupation of the Ruhr.

== Gallery ==
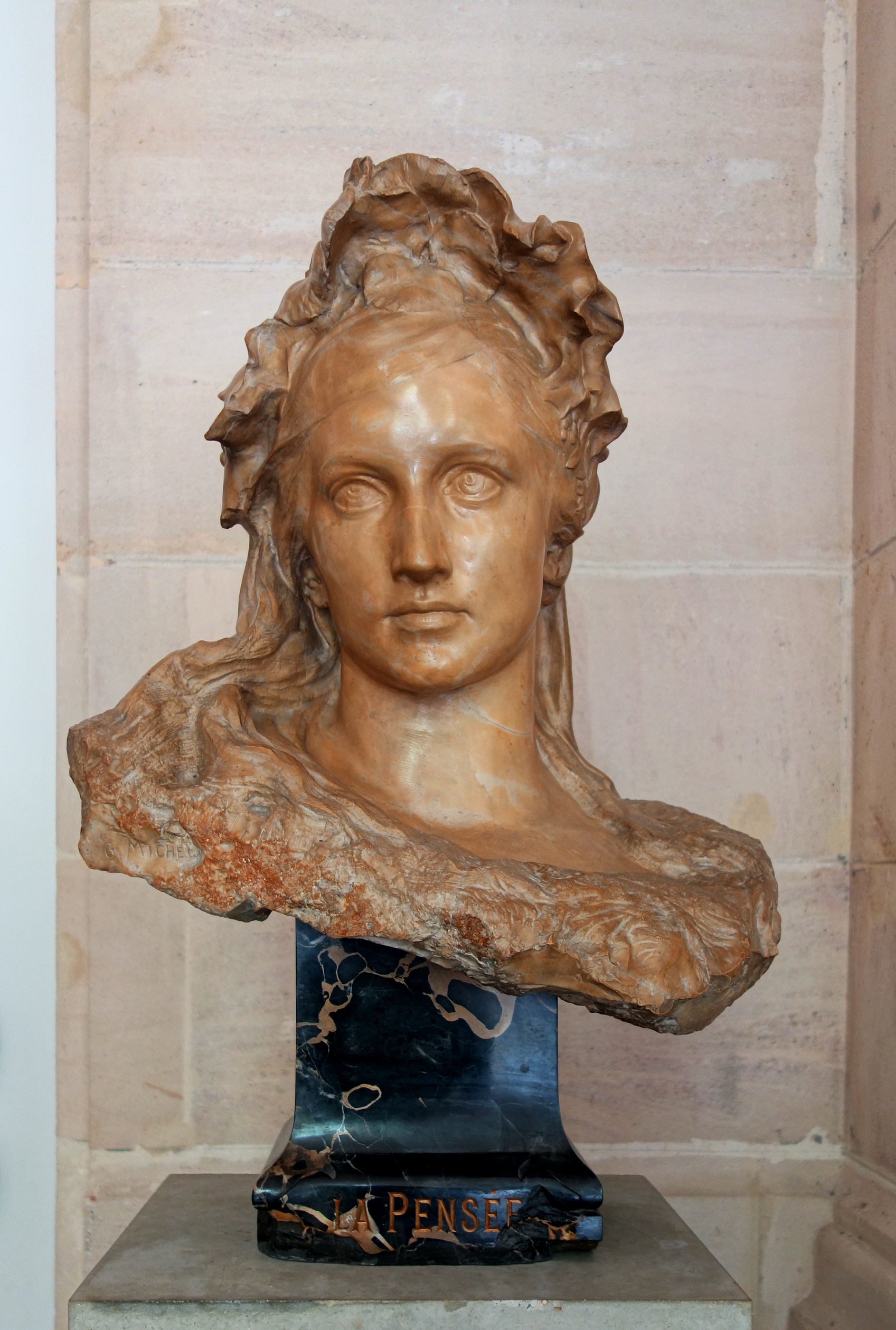
La Pensée (1896), Palais des Beaux-Arts in Lille.

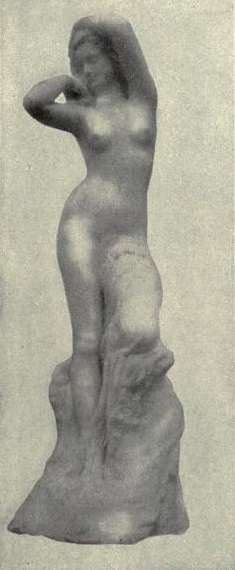
Dreaming (1897), Luxembourg Museum in Paris.

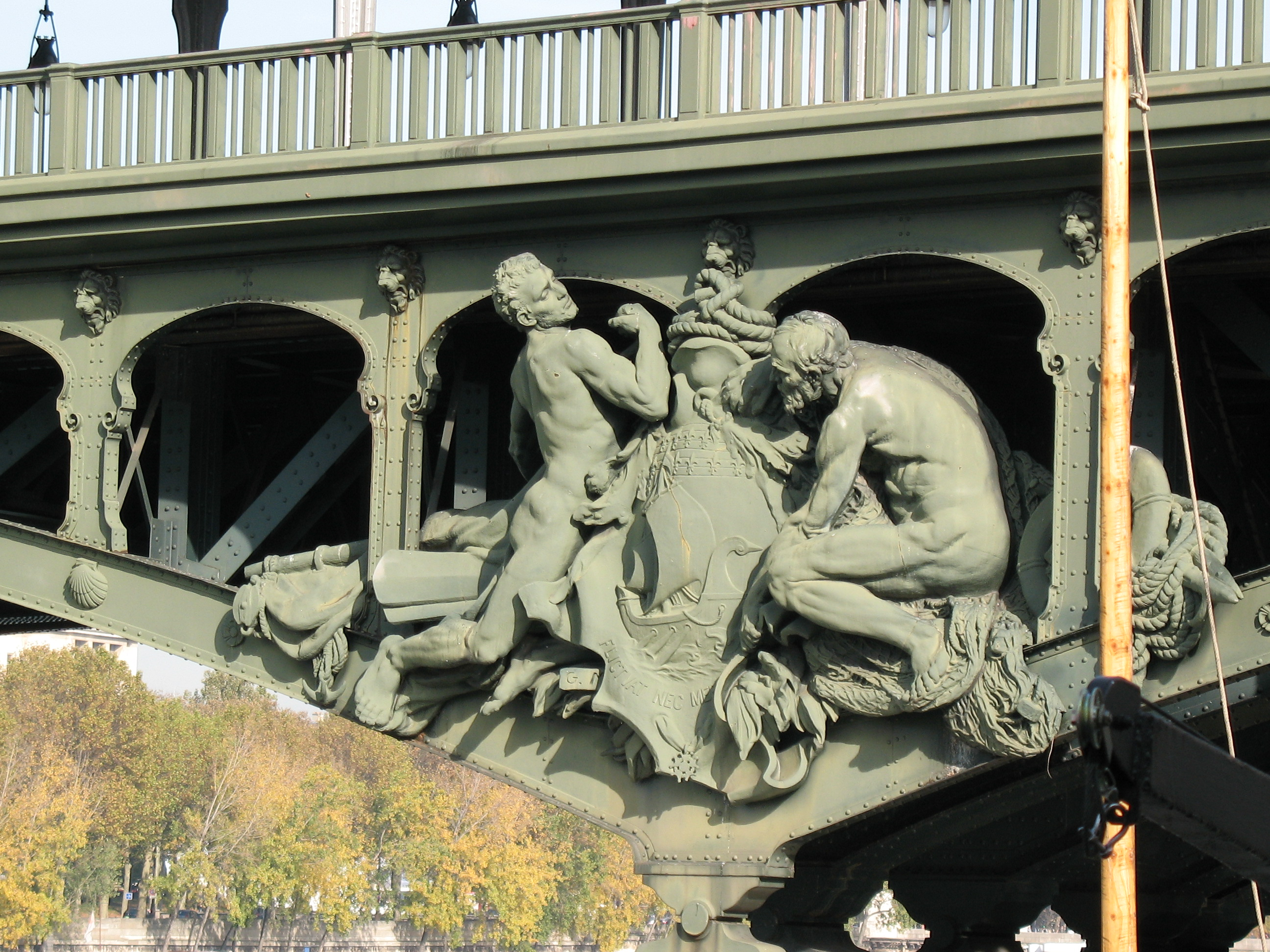
Sculpture group (c. 1900), Pont de Bir-Hakeim, Paris.

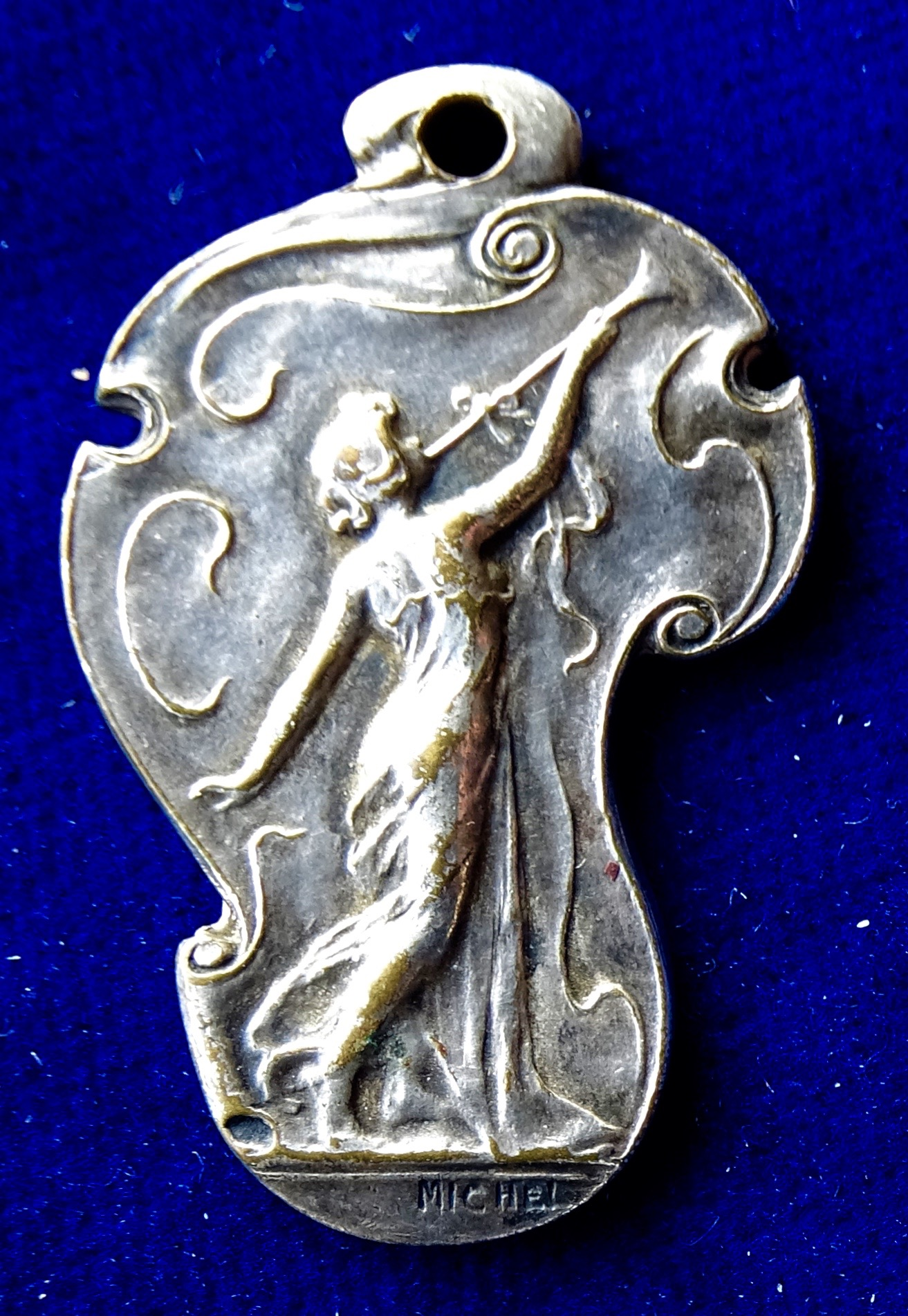
Ruhr Occupation, French Art Medal 1924 by Michel. Obverse: Female r. playing a natural trumpet.

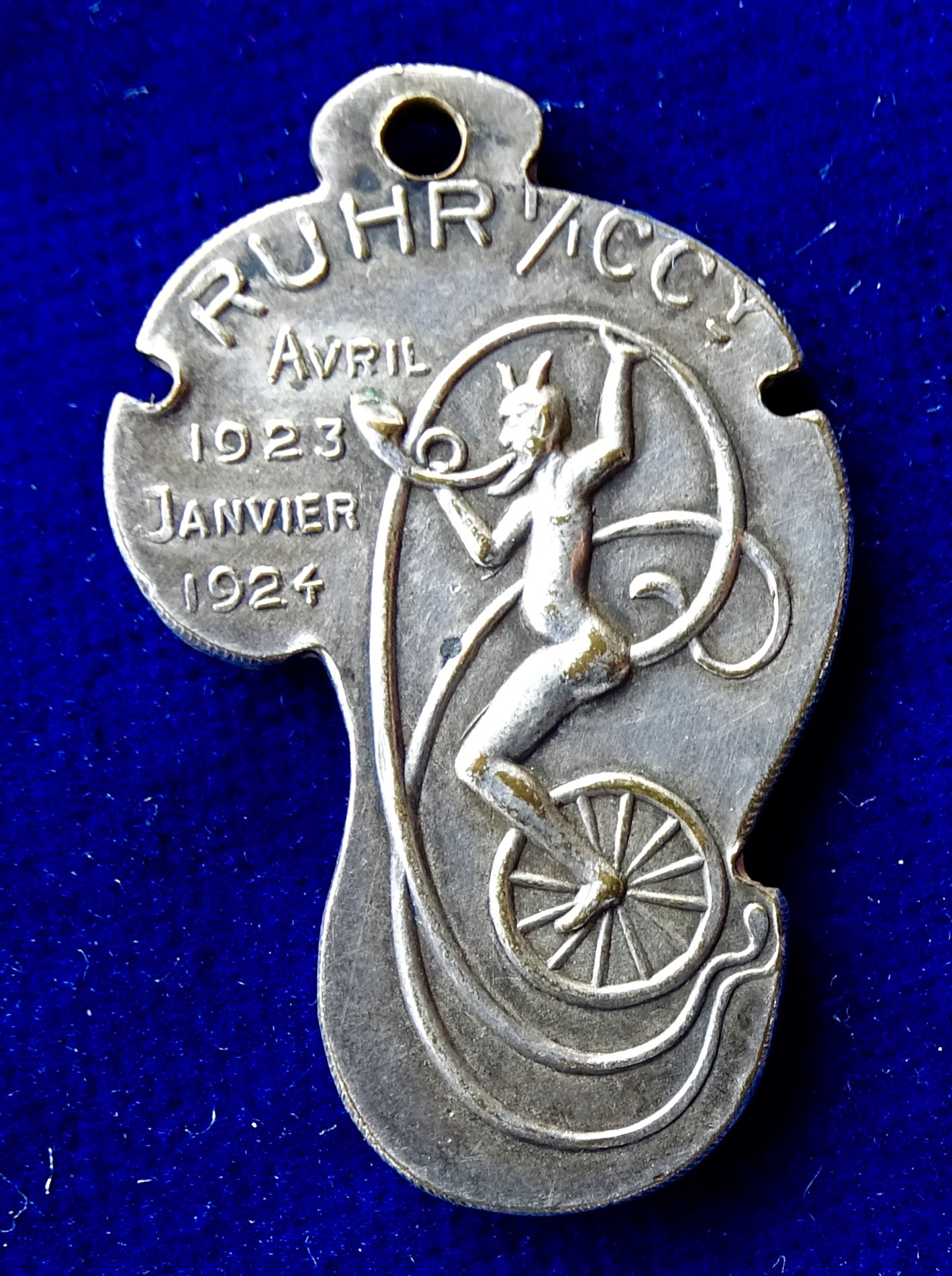
Ruhr Occupation, French Art Medal 1924 by Michel. Reverse: The devil riding on a unicycle l., and playing a French horn.
