= Edith Howland =

American sculptor (1863–1949)

- Born: 1863; Auburn, New York, U.S.
- Died: 1949 (aged 85–86)
- Occupation: Sculptor

Edith Howland (1863–1949) was an American sculptor.

Born in Auburn, New York, Howland studied with Gustave Michel, Daniel Chester French, and Augustus Saint-Gaudens; she received an honorable mention at the Paris Salon of 1913. She was a member of the Art Students League of New York, the National Sculpture Society, and the National Association of Women Painters and Sculptors. One of her works is in the collection of the Brooklyn Museum. She also created garden sculpture, and donated a piece to Brookgreen Gardens in 1940.
