= List of bridges in Paris =

There are many bridges in the city of Paris, principally over the River Seine, but also over the Canal de l'Ourcq.

== Statistics ==
In 2006, Paris had:

- 148 bridges over the Boulevard Périphérique
- 58 bridges used to carry Parisian streets over each other
- 49 passerelles piétonnières (pedestrian bridges)
- 37 bridges over the Seine
- 33 bridges used by the SNCF
- 10 bridges used by the Régie Autonome des Transports Parisiens (RATP)

== Seine ==
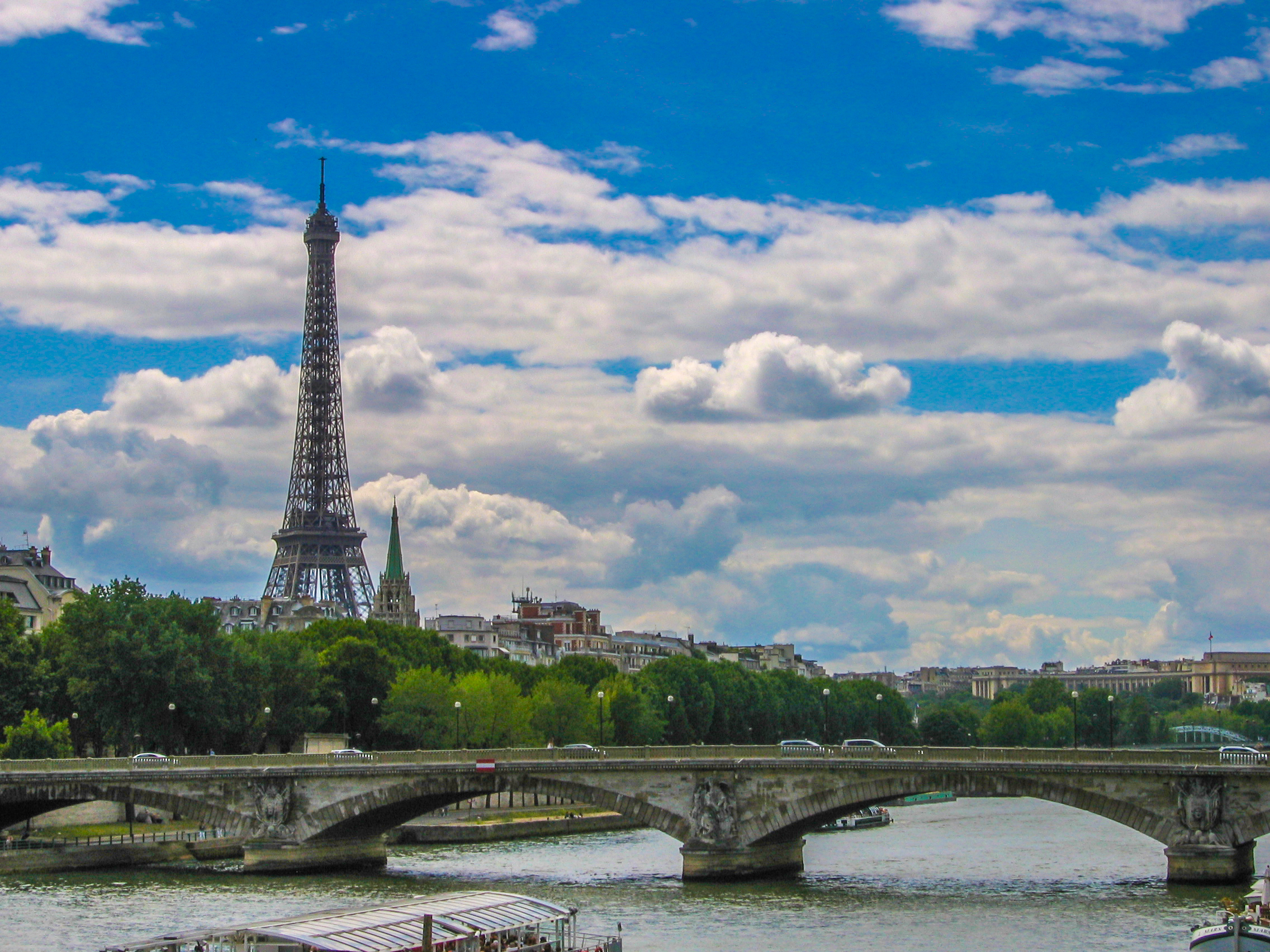
View over the Seine in Paris, Pont des Invalides

Paris has 37 bridges across the Seine, of which 5 are pedestrian only and 2 are rail bridges. Three link Île Saint-Louis to the rest of Paris, 8 do the same for Île de la Cité and one links the 2 islands to each other. A list follows, from upstream to downstream :

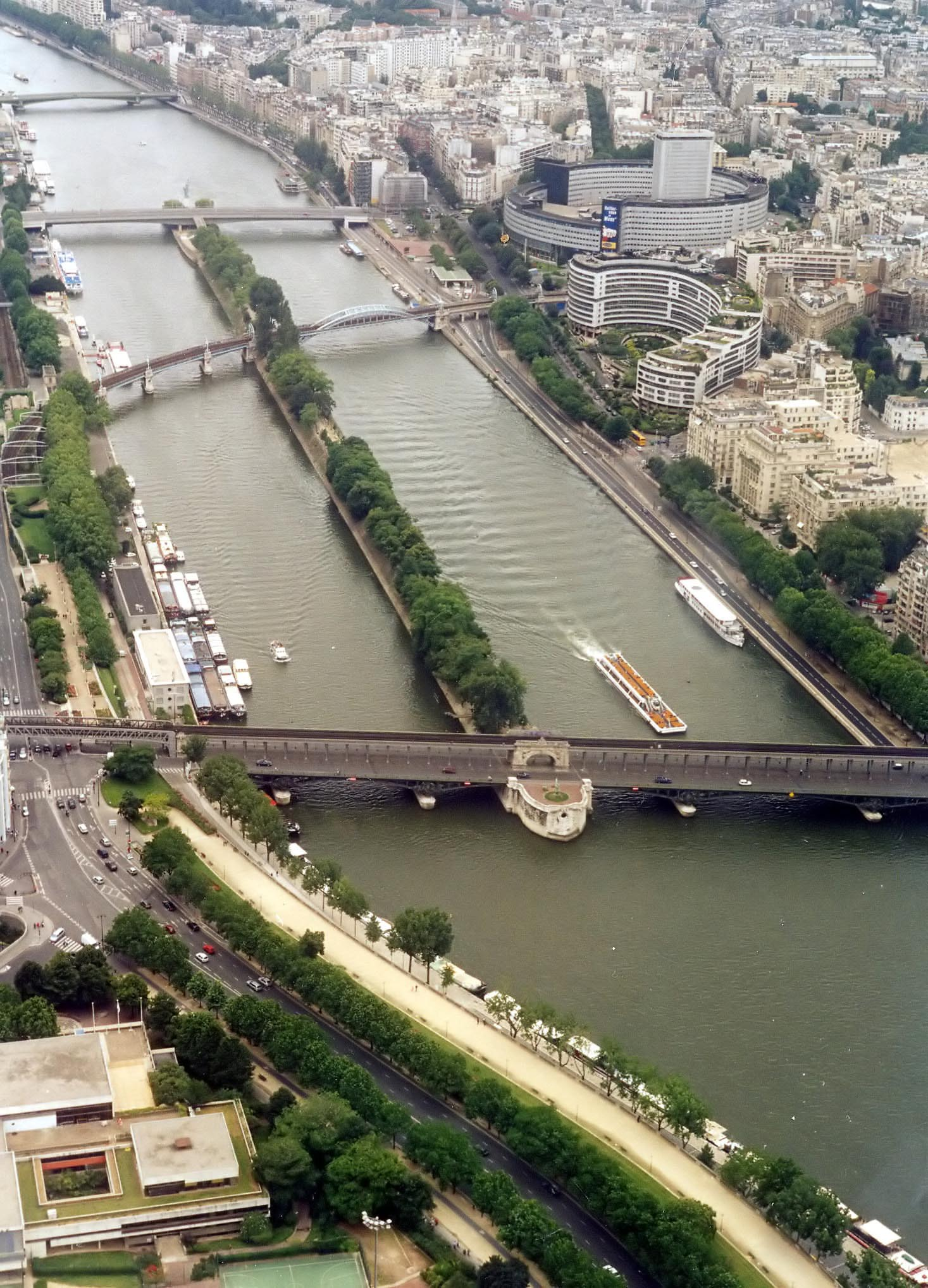
View downstream from the Eiffel Tower, showing, from bottom to top, Pont de Bir-Hakeim, Pont Rouelle, Pont de Grenelle, and Pont Mirabeau

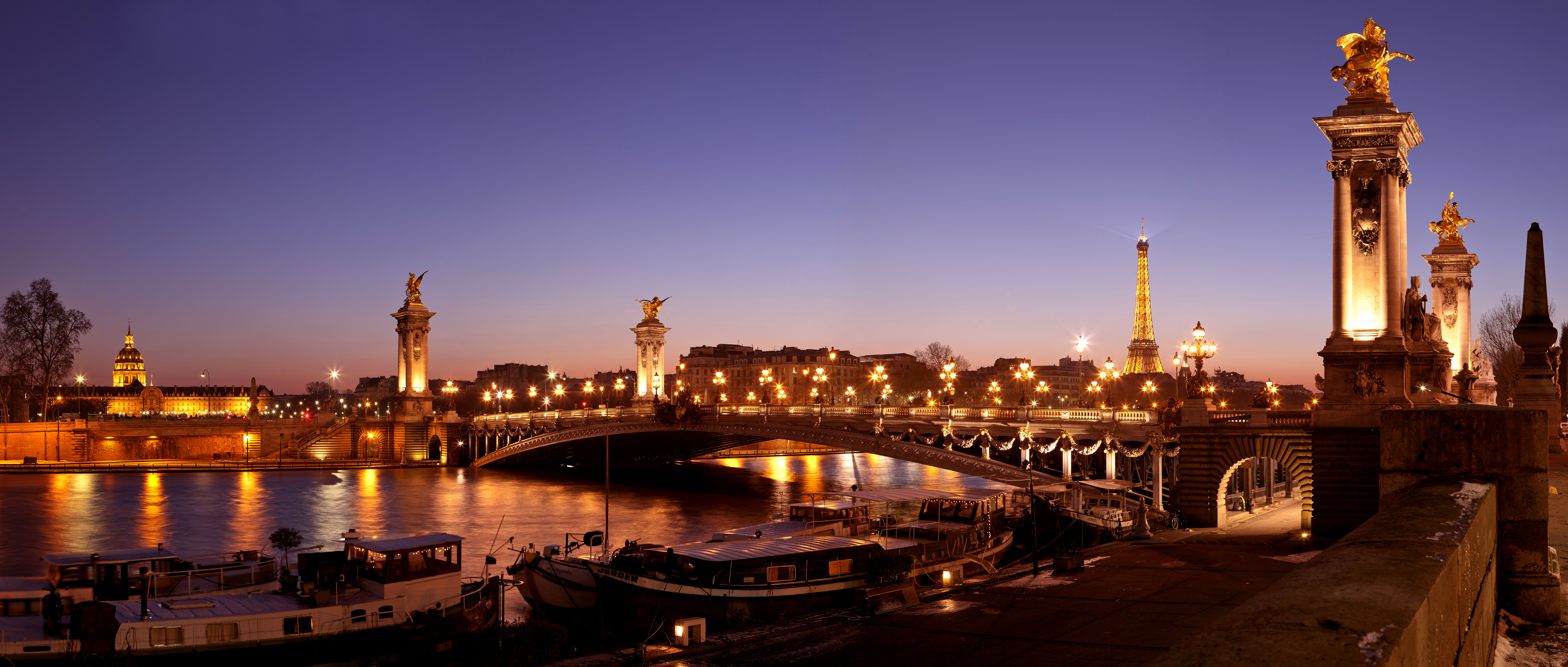
Pont Alexandre III

1. Pont amont (carrying the Boulevard Périphérique, situated at the river's entry to the city)
2. Pont National
3. Pont de Tolbiac
4. Passerelle Simone-de-Beauvoir (pedestrian), inaugurated 13 July 2006
5. Pont de Bercy (made up of a railway bridge carrying the Line 6 of the Paris Métro and another stage for road traffic);
6. Pont Charles-de-Gaulle (1996)
7. Viaduc d'Austerlitz (railway bridge used for Line 5 of the métro), directly followed on the Rive Droite by the viaduc du quai de la Rapée,
8. Pont d'Austerlitz
9. Pont de Sully (crosses the eastern corner of Île Saint-Louis)
10. Pont de la Tournelle (between the Rive Gauche and the Île Saint-Louis)
11. Pont Marie (between Île Saint-Louis and the rive droite)
12. Pont Louis-Philippe (between Île Saint-Louis and the rive droite)
13. Pont Saint-Louis (pedestrian zone, between Île de la Cité and the Île Saint-Louis)
14. Pont de l'Archevêché (between the rive gauche and Île de la Cité)
15. Pont au Double (between the rive gauche and Île de la Cité)
16. Pont d'Arcole (between Île de la Cité and the rive droite)
17. Petit Pont (between the rive gauche and Île de la Cité)
18. Pont Notre-Dame (between the Île de la Cité and the rive droite)
19. Pont Saint-Michel (between the Rive Gauche and the Île de la Cité)
20. Pont au Change (between the Île de la Cité and the Rive Droite)
21. Pont Neuf (crossing the west corner of the Île de la Cité, Paris's oldest bridge, built between 1578 and 1607)
22. Passerelle des Arts (pedestrian)
23. Pont du Carrousel
24. Pont Royal
25. Passerelle Léopold-Sédar-Senghor (1999) (pedestrian, formerly the Passerelle de Solférino, renamed in 2006)
26. Pont de la Concorde
27. Pont Alexandre III
28. Pont des Invalides
29. Pont de l'Alma
30. Passerelle Debilly (pedestrian)
31. Pont d'Iéna
32. Pont de Bir-Hakeim (crossing the Île aux Cygnes, comprising one stage with a railway bridge carrying Line 6 of the Paris Métro and another for road traffic)
33. Pont Rouelle (rail viaduct for line C of the RER crossing the Île aux Cygnes)
34. Pont de Grenelle (crossing the Île aux Cygnes)
35. Pont Mirabeau
36. Pont du Garigliano
37. Pont aval (used by the boulevard périphérique, at the river's exit from the city)

== Parisian canals ==
The Parisian canals are crossed by a number of bridges – the majority of which are passerelles piétonnes (footbridges) – and many of the road bridges can be raised or turned (temporarily interrupting road traffic) to allow canal traffic through.

- On the canal de l'Ourcq :
  - Pont de la rue de l'Ourcq
  - Passerelle de la rue de Crimée
  - Pont levant de la rue de Crimée
- On the canal Saint-Denis :
  - Boulevard Périphérique
  - Boulevard Macdonald
  - Avenue Corentin-Cariou
- On the canal Saint-Martin :
  - Pont de la rue Louis Blanc
  - Passerelle Bichat
  - Pont tournant de la Grange aux Belles
  - Passerelle Richerand
  - Passerelle Alibert
  - Pont tournant de la rue Dieu
  - Passerelle des Douanes
- At the level of the bassin de l'Arsenal :
  - Passerelle de Mornay
  - Pont Morland
  - Pont-métro Morland

== Passerelles piétonnières ==
Paris has 49 passerelles piétonnières (footbridges), listed by arrondissement:

- 1st arrondissement of Paris :
  - Passerelle Baillet
  - Passerelle des Tuileries
- 4th arrondissement of Paris :
  - Passerelle de l'Hôtel-de-Ville
- 6th arrondissement of Paris :
  - Pont des Arts
- 7th arrondissement of Paris :
  - Passerelle du Bac
  - Passerelle Debilly
  - Passerelle Léopold-Sédar-Senghor
- 9th arrondissement of Paris :
  - Pont de Cristal
  - Passerelle de Crimée
  - Passerelle Le Peletier
  - Passerelle de Mogador
  - Passerelle de la rue de Provence
  - Passerelle Sainte-Cécile
- 10th arrondissement of Paris :
  - Passerelle des Douanes
  - Passerelle Alibert
  - Passerelle Richerand
  - Passerelle de la Grange-aux-Belles
  - Passerelle Bichat
  - Passerelle de la rue de Maubeuge
- 12th arrondissement of Paris :
  - Passerelle de l'Arsenal
  - Passerelle des Meuniers
  - Passerelle Reuilly
  - Passerelle de Picpus
- 13th arrondissement of Paris :
  - Passerelle du Quai de la Gare
  - Passerelle Corvisart
  - Passerelle Alésia
  - Passerelle Commandant René Mouchotte
  - Passerelle Gergovie
  - Passerelle Vercingétorix
  - Passerelle Alain
  - Passerelle Jean Zay
  - Passerelle des Arts et Métiers
  - Passerelle du Cambodge
- 15th arrondissement of Paris :
  - Passerelle Bargues
  - Passerelle du Capitaine Ménard
  - Passerelle Ernest Renan
  - Passerelle rue de l'Ingénieur Robert Keller
  - Passerelle Leblanc
  - Passerelle Procession
  - Passerelle Tuileries
  - Passerelle des Quatre frères Peignot
- 16th arrondissement of Paris :
  - Passerelle l'Alboni
  - Passerelle de l'Avre
  - Passerelle Géo André
  - Passerelle Suzanne Lenglen
- 17th arrondissement of Paris :
  - Passerelle de la rue Juliette Lamber
- 18th arrondissement of Paris :
  - Passerelle de la rue Belhomme
- 19th arrondissement of Paris :
  - Passerelle des Ardennes
  - Passerelle de Crimée
  - Passerelle d'Hautpoul
  - Passerelle de la Moselle
  - Passerelle du Rond Point
- 20th arrondissement of Paris :
  - Passerelle de la Mare
  - Passerelle Lambeau

== Miscellaneous ==
There are several other bridges in Paris which do not cross a body of water. In the 10th arrondissement, Rue La Fayette and Rue de l'Aqueduc pass over the train lines of gare de l'Est. On the boundary between the 5th and 13th arrondissements, boulevard de Port-Royal spans Rue Broca and Rue Pascal. In the 18th arrondissement, rue Caulaincourt is carried over the Montmartre Cemetery by a bridge. In the 20th arrondissement, rue Charles-Renouvier spans rue des Pyrénées. In the 8th arrondissement, rue du Rocher crosses rue de Madrid.

Also, lines 2 and 6 of the Paris metro include several aerial viaducts in their above-ground zones, whilst RER C also has a viaduct along the length of quai André-Citroën.

Footbridges may also be found in the Parc des Buttes Chaumont and parc de Reuilly. Among others, the promenade plantée uses the old viaduc Daumesnil. In bois de Vincennes, the islands of Bercy and of Reuilly are linked to each other, and the east of the latter to the rest of the park.

The line for the chemin de fer de Petite Ceinture also includes several bridges and viaducts, as well as footbridges across it such as that carrying rue de la Mare in the 20th arrondissement.

== See also ==
- List of crossings of the River Seine
