= List of crossings of the Seine =

This is a list of present-day bridges over the River Seine and its channels, sorted by département, and then sorted from downstream to upstream. After each bridge is listed the name of the communes which it links together, with the one on the right bank of the river given first. The list does not include bridges over its tributaries. Beside the bridge crossings, eight ferry crossings, all located in the département de Seine Maritime are still in use as of 2020. Two are considered seagoing vessels (in reference to their gross tonnage) at Duclair and Quillebeuf sur Seine and can take lorries. The remaining six (Dieppedalle, Val de la Haye, La Bouille, le Mesnil sous Jumièges, Jumièges and Yainville) being smaller are considered river crafts and comply to respective regulations and crew requirements . Before 2009 the ferries operated by the département de Seine Maritime were free for the local cars (bearing the 76 registration) and a toll was charged for other french and foreign vehicles. Nowadays all Seine ferries are toll free and carry a total of 10 million passengers annually. It is not unusual for them to cross the wake of quite sizeable ocean going ships as Rouen is considered a seaport with a busy ship traffic.

All locations are in France.

== Crossings in Tidal Range ==
| Image | Crossing | Carries | Location | Built | Coordinates |
=== Seine-Maritime / Calvados ===
| Pont_de_Normandie_from_south_on_autoroute_A29_(July_2014) | Pont de Normandie | A29 | Le Havre – Honfleur | 1995 | 49°26′07″N 0°16′25″E |
=== Seine-Maritime / Eure (downstream) ===
| France_pont_TANCARVILLE_01 | Pont de Tancarville | A131 | Tancarville – Quillebeuf-sur-Seine | 1959 | 49°28′22″N 0°27′53″E |
=== Seine-Maritime ===
| Cargo-sur-la-Seine-devant-Caudebec-en-Caux-DSC_0375 | Pont de Brotonne | D490 | Caudebec-en-Caux – Saint-Nicolas-de-Bliquetuit | 1977 | 49°31′14″N 0°44′50″E |
| Pont_Gustave-Flaubert_(2023) | Gustave Flaubert Bridge | N1338 | Rouen | 2008 | 49°26′37″N 1°03′51″E |
| Pont_Guillaume_Conquérant_-_Rouen_(FR76)_-_2023-06-16_-_1 | Pont Guillaume-le-Conquérant | N138 | Rouen | 1970 | 49°26′24″N 1°04′51″E |
| Bridge_Jeanne_d'Arc_over_Seine_river_in_Rouen_(France) | Pont Jeanne-d'Arc | Road and Rouen's pré-métro | Rouen | 1956 | 49°26′17″N 1°05′17″E |
| Pont_Boieldieu_(-556760234)_(cropped) | Pont Boïeldieu | Road | Rouen | 1955 | 49°26′14″N 1°05′28″E |
| Pont_Pierre-Corneille_2014_-_panoramio_(5) | Pont Pierre-Corneille | D840 via Île Lacroix | Rouen | 1952 | 49°26′09″N 1°05′44″E |
| 2014-01-11_-_panoramio | Pont Mathilde | D6028 via Île Lacroix | Rouen | 1979 | 49°25′54″N 1°06′12″E |
| Viaduc_d'Eauplet | Viaduc d'Eauplet | Railway Bridge via Île Lacroix | Rouen | rebuilt in 1946 | 49°25′36″N 1°06′33″E |
| | Viaduc de Tourville/Viaduc d'Oissel | Railway Bridge | Tourville-la-Rivière – Oissel via Île Mayeux | | 49°20′13″N 1°06′09″E |
| | Ponts d'Oissel | D13 Road | Tourville-la-Rivière – Oissel via Île Mayeux | | 49°20′14″N 1°06′07″E |
| A13_-_Viaduc_d'Oissel_-4 | Viaduc d'Oissel | autoroute A13 | Tourville-la-Rivière – Oissel via Île Sainte-Catherine | | 49°19′58″N 1°04′52″E |
| Viaduc d'Orival 3 | Viaduc d'Orival | Railway | Saint-Aubin-lès-Elbeuf – Orival | | 49°18′36″N 0°59′56″E |
| Elbeuf_-_Pont_Guynemer_-_1 | Pont Guynemer suspension bridge | D7 Road | Elbeuf | 1953 | 49°17′38″N 1°00′16″E |
| 2025-05-29_Pont_Jean_Jaurès_Elbeuf_1150439 | Pont Jean-Jaurès | D144 Road | Saint-Aubin-lès-Elbeuf – Elbeuf | 1964 | 49°17′37″N 1°00′38″E |
=== Seine-Maritime / Eure (upstream) ===
| A13_-_Viaduc_de_Criquebeuf_-_Doublement_et_ouvrage_initial_-_Ensemble_vu_de_l'aval_en_rive_gauche | Viaduc de Criquebeuf | autoroute A 13 | Sotteville-sous-le-Val – Criquebeuf-sur-Seine | | 49°18′34″N 1°06′46″E |
=== Eure ===
| | Pont de Pont-de-l'Arche | D6015 Road | Igoville – Pont-de-l'Arche via Île Saint-Pierre | | 49°18′25″N 1°09′31″E |
| | Pont du Manoir | Railway | Le Manoir | | 49°18′32″N 1°11′54″E |
| Poses, F-27 (28746496493) | Passerelle de l'écluse d'Amfreville | Pedestrian lock/barrage crossing | Amfreville-sous-les-Monts – Poses via Île de Freneuse | | 49°18′42″N 1°14′15″E |

== Crossings in Middle Section ==
| Image | Crossing | Carries | Location | Built | Coordinates |
=== Eure ===
| Pont_de_Saint-Pierre-du-Vauvray | Ponts de Saint-Pierre-du-Vauvray | D313 Road | Andé – Saint-Pierre-du-Vauvray via Île du Bac | 1975 | 49°13′50″N 1°13′37″E |
| | Passerelle Muids-Bernières | Sand conveyer | Muids – Bernières-sur-Seine | 1999 | 49°14′09″N 1°19′52″E |
| LESANDELYS_PONT_SUSP_0941 | Pont suspendu des Andelys | D135 Road | Les Andelys – Tosny | 1947 | 49°14′11″N 1°23′56″E |
| Pont_sur_la_Seine_entre_Aubevoye_et_Courcelles_-_2016 | Pont de Courcelles-sur-Seine | D316 Road | Courcelles-sur-Seine – Aubevoye | 1966 | 49°10′45″N 1°21′13″E |
| ECLUSE_ND_de_LA_GARENNE_0804_05 | Passerelle du barrage-écluse de Port-Mort | Pedestrian lock/barrage crossing | Port-Mort – Gaillon via Île Besac | 1889 | 49°10′10″N 1°23′14″E |
| Vieux_Pont_de_Vernon | Vieux pont de Vernon (Old Bridge of Vernon) | via Île du Talus. (In ruins, one arch survives) | Vernon | 12th century | 49°05′51″N 1°29′17″E |
| Vernon,_Vieux_Moulin_&_Pont_Clemenceau_depuis_la_Seine,_Journées_du_Patrimoine_2011_-_88 | Pont Clémenceau | D181 Road | Vernon | 1950 | 49°05′45″N 1°29′16″E |
=== Yvelines ===
| Bonnières-sur-Seine_-_Pont01 | Pont de Bonnières | D201 Road | Bennecourt – Bonnières-sur-Seine via Île aux Loisirs | | 49°02′17″N 1°34′17″E |
| Barrage_de_Méricourt01 | Barrage de Méricourt | Pedestrian crossing Barrage/Lock | | | 49°01′43″N 1°37′09″E |
| Mantes-la-Jolie_(78)_Pont_Neuf_de_Mantes_488 | Pont de Mantes | D983a Road | Limay – Mantes-la-Jolie via Île-aux-Dames | 1945 | 48°59′33″N 1°43′24″E |
| Vieux_Pont_de_Limay1_(cropped) | Vieux pont de Limay (Old Bridge of Limay) | In Ruins | Limay (right bank) - Île aux Dames | | 48°59′31″N 1°43′32″E |
| | Viaduc de Limay | D983 Road | Limay – Mantes-la-Ville via Île-aux-Dames | | 48°59′08″N 1°43′46″E |
| Chemin de halage à Mantes-la-Ville. Pont ferroviaire de la ligne Mantes-Paris par Meulan | Pont ferroviaire de Limay | Railway | Limay – Mantes-la-Ville via Île-aux-Dames | | 48°58′58″N 1°43′50″E |
| Pont_de_Rangiport02 | Pont de Rangiport | D130 Road | Gargenville - Épône via Île de Rangiport | | 48°58′21″N 1°48′30″E |
| Pont_Rhin_et_Danube_Meulan_les_Mureaux_oct_2018b | Pont Rhin et Danube | D14 Road | Meulan - Mureaux via Île Belle | 1957 | 49°00′04″N 1°54′24″E |
| Meulan-en-Yvelines_(78),_pont_aux_Perches,_côté_est_2 | Pont aux Perches | | Meulan on the right bank and Île du Fort | 12th-century | 49°00′12″N 1°54′35″E |
| Triel_-_Pont01 | Pont suspendu de Triel | D2 Road | Triel-sur-Seine | 1956 | 48°58′43″N 2°00′05″E |
| Triel-sur-Seine_-_Pont_sur_la_Seine_-_Ensemble_vu_de_l'amont_culée_rive_droite | Pont de Triel-sur-Seine | D1 Road | Triel-sur-Seine – Vernouillet via Île Hernière | 2003 | 48°58′03″N 2°00′05″E |
| Ancien_pont_poissy | Ancien pont de Poissy | In ruins. Pedestrian Crossing under construction | Poissy - Île de Migneaux | 13th Century | 48°56′02″N 2°02′13″E |
| Poissy_-_Pont01 | Pont de Poissy | D190 Road | Carrières-sous-Poissy – Poissy | 1949 | 48°56′11″N 2°02′19″E |
| | Boucle de Chanteloup | Link Road Under Construction | Poissy | | 48°57′32″N 2°02′57″E |
| Pont_ferroviaire_de_Conflans-Sainte-Honorine | Viaduc Joly | Railway | Conflans-Sainte-Honorine | 1947 | 48°59′13″N 2°04′31″E |
| IMG_0181_pont_conflans_sainte_honorine | Pont de Conflans | N184 Road and Pedestrian (Passerelle Saint-Nicolas) | Conflans-Sainte-Honorine | 1950 | 48°59′20″N 2°04′56″E |
| Maisons-Laffitte_Bords_de_Seine_2011_2 | Pont de la 2e Division Blindée | D308 Road | Sartrouville – Maisons-Laffitte | | 48°56′41″N 2°09′29″E |
| Pont_sncf_de_maisons-lafittes_-_mai_2015_05 | Pont ferroviaire de Maisons-Laffitte | Railway | Sartrouville – Maisons-Laffitte via Île de la Commune | | 48°56′33″N 2°08′57″E |
| Pont_A14_sur_la_Seine_Montesson_-_panoramio | Viaduc de Montesson | A14 | Montesson – Le Mesnil-le-Roi | | 48°55′04″N 2°07′12″E |

== Crossings in Paris Environs ==
| Image | Crossing | Carries | Location | Built | Coordinates |
=== Yvelines ===
| Viaduc_ferroviaire_du_Pecq_06 | Viaduc de la Vallée | Railway | Le Pecq via Île Corbière | | 48°54′12″N 2°06′40″E |
| Pont_du_Pecq_002 | Pont Georges Pompidou | D186 Road | Le Pecq | 1963 | 48°53′52″N 2°06′30″E |
| Bougival_Berges_de_Seine_001 | Pont du Maréchal-De-Latte-de-Tassigny | D321 Road | Croissy-sur-Seine – Bougival via Île de la Chaussée | | 48°52′13″N 2°08′14″E |
=== Yvelines / Hauts-de-Seine ===
| Pont_ferroviaire_de_Chatou_003 | Pont ferroviaire de Chatou | Railway bridge | Chatou – Rueil-Malmaison via Île des Impressionnistes | | 48°53′08″N 2°09′48″E |
| Pont_de_Chatou | Pont de Chatou | D991 Road | Chatou – Rueil-Malmaison via Île des Impressionnistes | | 48°53′18″N 2°09′47″E |
| Viaduc_de_Carrieres_sur_seine_-_Avril_2012 | Viaduc de Carrières-sur-Seine | autoroute A14 | Carrières-sur-Seine – Nanterre via Île Fleurie | 1996 | 48°54′21″N 2°11′41″E |
| Ligne de Nanterre a Sartrouville - viaduc de Nanterre - MI2N - Avril 2012 (3) | Viaduc ferroviaire de Nanterre | Railway | Carrières-sur-Seine – Nanterre via Île Fleurie | | 48°54′25″N 2°11′47″E |
=== Val-d'Oise / Hauts-de-Seine ===
| PontCheminDeHalageNanterre | Pont des Anglais | Railway | Bezons – Nanterre via Île Fleurie | | 48°54′38″N 2°12′19″E |
| Pont_de_Bezons_-_Avril_2013_(8) | Pont de Bezons | D392 Road/Paris Metro | Bezons – Colombes | 1953 | 48°55′14″N 2°13′13″E |
| Pont_Aqueduc_de_Colombes_vu_depuis_Colombes | Pont-aqueduc de Colombes | D15e Road and waste water | Argenteuil – Colombes | | 48°55′58″N 2°14′31″E |
| Argenteuil_-_Pont_(11) | Pont d'Argenteuil | D909 Road | Argenteuil – Gennevilliers | | 48°56′25″N 2°15′18″E |
| Viaduc_ferroviaire_d'Argenteuil_-_Cropped | Pont ferroviaire d'Argenteuil | Railway | Argenteuil – Gennevilliers | 1877 | 48°56′36″N 2°15′38″E |
| Viaduc_Gennevilliers_-_Argenteuil_(FR95)_-_2024-04-16_-_2 | Viaduc de Gennevilliers | Autoroute A15 | Argenteuil – Gennevilliers | 1976 | 48°56′59″N 2°16′49″E |
=== Seine-Saint-Denis / Hauts-de-Seine ===
| Pont_sncf_d'epinay_-_grand_bras_-_octobre_2015_(2) | Pont ferroviaire d'Épinay | Railway | Épinay-sur-Seine – Gennevilliers via L'Île-Saint-Denis | | 48°57′07″N 2°18′07″E |
| Pont_d'epinay_-_grand_bras_-_octobre_2015_(5) | Pont d'Épinay | D910 Road | Épinay-sur-Seine – Gennevilliers via L'Île-Saint-Denis | | 48°57′05″N 2°18′25″E |
| Pont_de_l'Île-Saint-Denis_-1 | Pont de l'île Saint-Denis | D986 Road / Paris Metro | Saint-Denis – Villeneuve-la-Garenne via L'Île-Saint-Denis | 1905 | 48°56′09″N 2°20′30″E |
| Pont_A86_Seine_-_L'Île-Saint-Denis_(FR93)_-_2021-05-20_-_3 | Viaduc autoroutier de L'Île-Saint-Denis | A 86 | Saint-Ouen – Villeneuve-la-Garenne via L'Île-Saint-Denis | | 48°55′37″N 2°20′06″E |
| Pont_de_Saint-Ouen-les-Docks_-_Aout_2013_(4) | Pont de Saint-Ouen-les-Docks | D20 Road | Saint-Ouen – Gennevilliers via L'Île-Saint-Denis | | 48°55′07″N 2°19′44″E |
| ZAC_des_Docks,_93400_Saint-Ouen,_France_-_panoramio | Pont ferroviaire de Saint-Ouen | Railway | Saint-Ouen | | 48°54′55″N 2°19′02″E |
=== Hauts-de-Seine (downstream) ===
| Pont_de_Gennevilliers_004 | Pont de Gennevilliers | D17 Road | Clichy – Asnières-sur-Seine | | 48°54′47″N 2°18′39″E |
| Ponts_de_clichy_-_octobre_2015_(4) | Pont de Clichy | D19 Road, Paris Métro Line 13 | Clichy – Asnières-sur-Seine | 1975 | 48°54′35″N 2°17′58″E |
| Pont_d'Asnières | Pont d'Asnières | D909 Road | Clichy – Asnières-sur-Seine | 1887 | 48°54′15″N 2°17′19″E |
| Pont_ferroviaire_d'Asnières_-_1 | Pont ferroviaire d'Asnières | Railway | Clichy – Asnières-sur-Seine | | 48°54′13″N 2°17′14″E |
| Pont_de_Levallois_3 | Pont de Levallois | D9B Road | Levallois-Perret – Courbevoie via Île de la Jatte | 1919 | 48°54′01″N 2°16′38″E |
| Pont_de_Courbevoie_001 | Pont de Courbevoie | D908 Road | Neuilly-sur-Seine – Courbevoie via Île de la Jatte | 1924 | 48°53′46″N 2°15′55″E |
| Pont_de_Neuilly_002 | Pont de Neuilly | N13 Road and Paris Métro Line 1 | Neuilly-sur-Seine – Puteaux via Île de Puteaux | 1992 | 48°53′12″N 2°15′17″E |
| Pont_de_Puteaux_006 | Pont de Puteaux | D104 Road | Neuilly-sur-Seine – Puteaux via Île de Puteaux | 1980 | 48°52′41″N 2°14′35″E |
=== Paris / Hauts-de-Seine === The following bridge is partly in the Bois de Boulogne, which is in the 16th arrondissement of the département and commune of Paris, although not in the city (ville) of Paris.
| Vue Pont de Suresnes3 | Pont de Suresnes | D985 Road | Paris – Suresnes | 1942 | 48°52′01″N 2°13′46″E |
=== Hauts-de-Seine (upstream) ===
| Saint-Cloud_-_Passerelle_de_l'Avre_004 | Passerelle de l'Aqueduc de l'Avre | Pedestrian/water pipes | Paris – Saint-Cloud | 1891 | 48°51′11″N 2°13′28″E |
| Boulogne-Billancourt_-_Saint-Cloud_-_A13_Bridge_-_2 | Viaduc autoroutier de Saint-Cloud | Autoroute A13 | Paris – Saint-Cloud | 1974 | 48°50′53″N 2°13′32″E |
| Pont_de_Saint-Cloud_-_1 | Pont de Saint-Cloud | D907 Road | Boulogne-Billancourt – Saint-Cloud | 1940 | 48°50′29″N 2°13′25″E |
| Pont_de_Sèvres_003 | Pont de Sèvres | D910 Road | Boulogne-Billancourt – Sèvres | 1963 | 48°49′43″N 2°13′38″E |
| Passerelle_Nord | Passerelle Nord/Passerelle Sud/Pont Renault | Pedestrian | Boulogne-Billancourt – Sèvres via Île Seguin | | 48°49′38″N 2°13′45″E |
| Pont_dayde_seguin | Pont Seibert/Pont Daydé | Bus Route | Boulogne-Billancourt – Sèvres via Île Seguin | 2022/1928 | 48°49′25″N 2°14′13″E |
| Pont_de_Billancourt_002 | Pont de Billancourt | D2 Road | Boulogne-Billancourt – Issy-les-Moulineaux via Île Saint-Germain | | 48°49′28″N 2°14′56″E |
| Pont_d_issy | Pont d'Issy | D50 Road | Boulogne-Billancourt – Issy-les-Moulineaux via Île Saint-Germain | | 48°49′49″N 2°15′34″E |

== Crossings in Paris ==
| Image | Crossing | Carries | Location | Built | Coordinates |
=== Paris / Hauts-de-Seine === The city of Paris has 37 bridges across the Seine, of which 3 are pedestrian only and 2 are rail bridges. Three link Île Saint-Louis to the rest of Paris, 8 do the same for Île de la Cité and one links the 2 islands to each other. The many Metro tunnels are not included here.
| P1080257_Paris_XVI_pont_aval_rwk | Pont Aval | Boulevard Périphérique | 15th Arrondissement - 16th Arrondissement | 1968 | 48°50′06″N 2°15′50″E |
| Pont_du_Garigliano_Paris_FRA_002 | Pont du Garigliano | Road | 15th Arrondissement - 16th Arrondissement | 1966 | 48°50′22″N 2°16′06″E |
| Paris_-_Pont_Mirabeau_(27288497624) | Pont Mirabeau | Road | 15th Arrondissement - 16th Arrondissement | 1897 | 48°50′48″N 2°16′32″E |
| Pont_de_Grenelle_from_Ile_aux_Cygnes,_Paris_7_February_2016 | Pont de Grenelle | via Île aux Cygnes | 15th Arrondissement - 16th Arrondissement | 1827 | 48°51′01″N 2°16′48″E |
| Pont_Rouelle_Paris_15e_002 | Pont Rouelle | Railway via Île aux Cygnes | 15th Arrondissement - 16th Arrondissement | 1900 | 48°51′08″N 2°17′01″E |
| P1080370_Paris_VII-XV-XVI_pont_de_Bir_Hakeim_rwk | Pont de Bir-Hakeim | Road and Line 6 via Île aux Cygnes | 15th Arrondissement - 16th Arrondissement | 1905 | 48°51′20″N 2°17′15″E |
| Pont_d'Iéna_(337) | Pont d'Iéna | Road | 7th Arrondissement - 16th Arrondissement | 1814 | 48°51′35″N 2°17′32″E |
| Passerelle_Debilly,_Paris_9_July_2016 | Passerelle Debilly | Pedestrian | 7th Arrondissement - 16th Arrondissement | 1900 | 48°51′46″N 2°17′49″E |
| Pont_de_l'Alma_@_Seine_river_@_Paris_(24192574021) | Pont de l'Alma | Road | 7th Arrondissement - 8th Arrondissement/ 16th Arrondissement | 1974 | 48°51′49″N 2°18′06″E |
| Pont_des_Invalides,_Paris_3_June_2010 | Pont des Invalides | Road | 7th Arrondissement - 8th Arrondissement | 1856 | 48°51′49″N 2°18′37″E |
| Pont_Alexandre_III,_Paris_8th_025 | Pont Alexandre III | Road | 7th Arrondissement - 8th Arrondissement | 1900 | 48°51′49″N 2°18′49″E |
| P1020427_Paris_VII_Palais_Bourbon_pont_de_la_concorde_rwk | Pont de la Concorde | Road | 7th Arrondissement - 8th Arrondissement | 1791 | 48°51′48″N 2°19′11″E |
| Paris_Passerelle_Léopold-Sédar-Senghor_20161111_towards_north | Passerelle Léopold-Sédar-Senghor | Pedestrian (formerly the Passerelle de Solférino) | 7th Arrondissement - 1st Arrondissement | 1999 | 48°51′43″N 2°19′29″E |
| Pont_Royal,_Paris_2_August_2015 | Pont Royal | Road | 7th Arrondissement - 1st Arrondissement | 1689 | 48°51′36″N 2°19′48″E |
| Pont_du_Carrousel,_Paris_21_November_2006 | Pont du Carrousel | Road | 6th Arrondissement/ 7th Arrondissement - 1st Arrondissement | 1939 | 48°51′34″N 2°19′59″E |
| Pont_des_Arts_and_the_Palais_du_Louvre,_Paris_July_2013 | Passerelle des Arts | Pedestrian | 6th Arrondissement - 1st Arrondissement | 1984 | 48°51′30″N 2°20′15″E |
| Pont_Neuf_-_Paris_-_France | Pont Neuf | Road via Île de la Cité | 6th Arrondissement - 1st Arrondissement | 1607 | 48°51′28″N 2°20′31″E |
| Pont_au_Change,_East_View_from_Île_de_la_Cité_140320_1 | Pont Saint-Michel/Pont au Change | Road via Île de la Cité | 6th Arrondissement/ 5th Arrondissement - 1st Arrondissement/ 4th Arrondissement | 1857/1860 | 48°51′24″N 2°20′48″E |
| France_Paris_Pont_Notre_Dame_01 | Petit Pont/Pont Notre-Dame | Road via Île de la Cité | 5th Arrondissement - 4th Arrondissement | 1853/1914 | 48°51′22″N 2°20′55″E |
| Pont_d'Arcole_-_Vue_d'ensemble_vers_Notre-Dame | Pont au Double/Pont d'Arcole | Road via Île de la Cité | 5th Arrondissement - 4th Arrondissement | 1883/1856 | 48°51′20″N 2°21′02″E |
| P1040599_Paris_IV_pont_Louis-Philippe_rwk | Pont de l'Archevêché/Pont Saint-Louis/Pont Louis-Philippe | Road via Île Saint-Louis/Île de la Cité | 5th Arrondissement - 4th Arrondissement | 1828/1970/1862 | 48°51′14″N 2°21′16″E |
| Pont_Marie_2009-06-02_Paris_01 | Pont de la Tournelle/Pont Marie | Road via Île Saint-Louis | 5th Arrondissement - 4th Arrondissement | 1930/1635 | 48°51′10″N 2°21′27″E |
| Pont_de_Sully,_Paris_14_January_2017 | Pont de Sully | Road via Île Saint-Louis | 5th Arrondissement - 4th Arrondissement | 1877 | 48°50′59″N 2°21′29″E |
| P1010554_Paris_XIII-XII_Pont_d'Austerlitz_reducwk | Pont d'Austerlitz | Road | 5th Arrondissement/ 13th Arrondissement - 12th Arrondissement | 1807 | 48°50′42″N 2°21′58″E |
| Paris_-_Viaduc_d'Austerlitz_(22923398880) | Viaduc d'Austerlitz | Line 5 | 13th Arrondissement - 12th Arrondissement | 1904 | 48°50′37″N 2°22′04″E |
| Pont_Charles-de-Gaulle_Paris_FRA_002 | Pont Charles-de-Gaulle | Road | 13th Arrondissement - 12th Arrondissement | 1998 | 48°50′33″N 2°22′09″E |
| Paris_Metro_PontDeBercy_LookUpstreamToLeftBank_(11241499164) | Pont de Bercy | Road and Line 6 | 13th Arrondissement - 12th Arrondissement | 1991 | 48°50′17″N 2°22′30″E |
| Passerelle_Simone-de-Beauvoir | Passerelle Simone-de-Beauvoir | Pedestrian | 13th Arrondissement - 12th Arrondissement | 2006 | 48°50′07″N 2°22′42″E |
| Pont_de_Tolbiac_2 | Pont de Tolbiac | Road | 13th Arrondissement - 12th Arrondissement | 1882 | 48°49′59″N 2°22′52″E |
| Pont_National_Paris_FRA_002 | Pont National | Road/Métro | 13th Arrondissement - 12th Arrondissement | 1853 | 48°49′41″N 2°23′14″E |
| Pont_amont,_Paris_3_October_2014 | Pont Amont | Boulevard Périphérique | 13th Arrondissement - 12th Arrondissement | 1969 | 48°49′36″N 2°23′20″E |

== Crossings Upstream of Paris ==
=== Val-de-Marne ===
- Pont Nelson Mandela downstream (D 50b), Charenton-le-Pont – Ivry-sur-Seine
- Pont Nelson Mandela upstream (D 50), Charenton-le-Pont – Ivry-sur-Seine
- Passerelle Charenton - Ivry (pedestrian bridge and support for electric cables), Charenton-le-Pont – Ivry-sur-Seine
- Pont d'Ivry (N 19, 1957), Alfortville – Ivry-sur-Seine
- Passerelle de l'écluse du Port à l'Anglais (footbridge over the lock of Port à l'Anglais), Alfortville – Ivry-sur-Seine
- Pont du Port à l'Anglais (D 48, suspension bridge, 1927), Alfortville – Vitry-sur-Seine
- Passerelle GDF de Vitry, Alfortville – Vitry-sur-Seine
- Viaduc de l'A 86, Choisy-le-Roi – Thiais
- Pont de Choisy (N 186, 1965), Choisy-le-Roi
- Pont ferroviaire (Grande Ceinture line), Choisy-le-Roi
- Pont de Villeneuve-le-Roi (D 32, 1950), Villeneuve-Saint-Georges – Villeneuve-le-Roi
- Passerelle de l'écluse d'Ablon, Vigneux-sur-Seine – Ablon-sur-Seine
- Pont d'Athis-Mons (SNCF railway bridge), Vigneux-sur-Seine – Athis-Mons
- Pont de la Première-Armée-Française (D 931), Draveil – Juvisy-sur-Orge
- Pont de Champrosay, Champrosay – Ris-Orangis

=== Essonne ===
- Pont d'Évry (double apron, D 96), Étiolles – Évry
- Pont autoroutier (A 104), Corbeil-Essonnes
- Viaduc N 104, Saint-Germain-lès-Corbeil – Corbeil-Essonnes
- Pont de l'Armée-Patton (N 446), Corbeil-Essonnes

=== Seine-et-Marne ===
- Pont de Sainte-Assise (D 50), Seine-Port – Saint-Fargeau-Ponthierry
- Pont du Mée (SNCF railway bridge), Le Mée-sur-Seine – Dammarie-lès-Lys
- Pont de la pénétrante (N 6), Melun
- Pont Jeanne-d'Arc, Melun
- Pont Jean-de-Lattre-de-Tassigny, Melun
- Pont du Général-Leclerc, Melun
- Pont Notre-Dame, Melun
- Pont du Pet au Diable (SNCF railway bridge), Vaux-le-Pénil – La Rochette
- Pont de Chartrettes (D 115), Chartrettes – Bois-le-Roi
- Pont de Fontaine-le-Port (D 116), Fontaine-le-Port
- Pont de Valvins (D 210), Vulaines-sur-Seine – Samois-sur-Seine
- Pont-aqueduc de Champagne (D 301), Champagne-sur-Seine – Thomery
- Pont de Champagne (road-bridge) (D 301), Champagne-sur-Seine – Thomery
- Pont de Saint-Mammès (D 40), Champagne-sur-Seine – Saint-Mammès
- Pont de Varennes (SNCF railway bridge), La Grande-Paroisse – Varennes-sur-Seine -
- Pont de Seine (N 105), Montereau-Fault-Yonne
- Pont Saint-Martin (junction D 403/D 441), Montereau-Fault-Yonne
- Railway viaduct (LGV Paris-Sud-Est), Montereau-Fault-Yonne
- Motorway viaduct (autoroute A5), Montereau-Fault-Yonne
- Railway bridge, Saint-Germain-Laval
- Pont (D 29), Marolles-sur-Seine
- Pont de La Tombe (D 29), La Tombe
- Pont (D 77), Balloy
- Pont de Bray-sur-Seine, Mouy-sur-Seine – Bray-sur-Seine
- Pont de Noyen (D 78), Noyen-sur-Seine
- Pont (D 49a), Villiers-sur-Seine

=== Aube ===
- Pont (D 168), Courceroy
- Pont (D 619), Nogent-sur-Seine
- Pont (D 919), Nogent-sur-Seine, in two parts, resting on Île des Écluses
- Pont de Bernières (pont ferroviaire SNCF), Nogent-sur-Seine
- Pont (D 68), Marnay-sur-Seine
- Pont (D 52), Pont-sur-Seine

=== Marne ===
- Pont (D 48), Conflans-sur-Seine
- Pont (D 50), Marcilly-sur-Seine
- Pont, Marcilly-sur-Seine, confluence of the Aube and the canal de la Haute Seine, limit of the navigable Seine

=== Aube (incomplete) ===
- Pont (D 440), Romilly-sur-Seine
- Pont (D 116), Maizières-la-Grande-Paroisse
- Pont (D 178), Saint-Oulph
- Pont (D 373), Méry-sur-Seine

== See also ==
- Complete List (in French)
- Seine
- List of bridges in Paris
- List of locks on the Seine
