= Passerelle Simone-de-Beauvoir =

Bridge in Paris, France

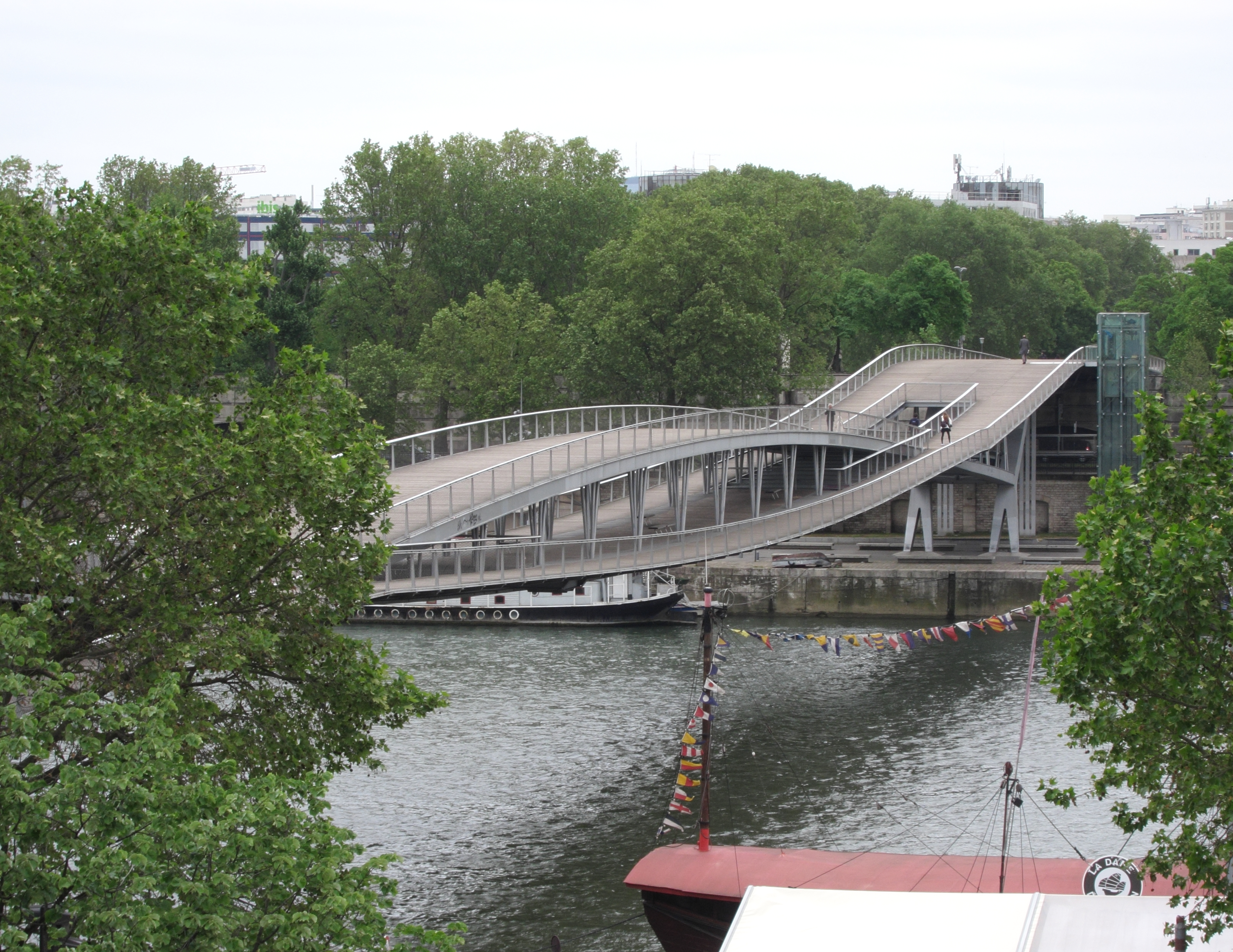
- Coordinates: 48°50′08″N 2°22′39″E
- Crosses: Seine
- Locale: Paris, France
- Next upstream: Pont de Tolbiac
- Next downstream: Pont de Bercy

Characteristics
- Design: Lenticular (lens shaped) structure with rotational anchorages in the supports
- Total length: 304 metres (997 ft)
- Width: 12 metres (39 ft)

History
- Construction start: 2004
- Construction end: 2006
- Opened: 2006

Location
- Interactive map of Passerelle Simone-de-Beauvoir

The Passerelle Simone-de-Beauvoir (French pronunciation: [pasʁɛl simɔn də bovwaʁ]; initially known by the provisional name of passerelle Bercy-Tolbiac) is a bridge solely for pedestrians and cyclists across the Seine River in Paris. It is the 37th bridge on the Seine in Paris. It is located between the bridges of Pont de Bercy and Pont de Tolbiac and links up the 12th and 13th arrondissements of Paris. Its nearest Paris Metro station is Quai de la Gare.

== History ==
The central span of the bridge (named the peltinée by its architects, Feichtinger Architectes, under Dietmar Feichtinger) is made of steel, weighs 650 tonnes (640 long tons; 720 short tons), is 106 metres (348 ft) long and 12 metres (39 ft) wide. The span was constructed by the Eiffel company (Eiffel Constructions métalliques) in the Alsace and was transported by canal, the North Sea, the English Channel and French rivers (with difficulties due to sluices being too narrow) to its destination, crossing Paris on a barge on 30 November 2005. It was hoisted in place in two hours on 29 January 2006, around three o'clock in the morning.

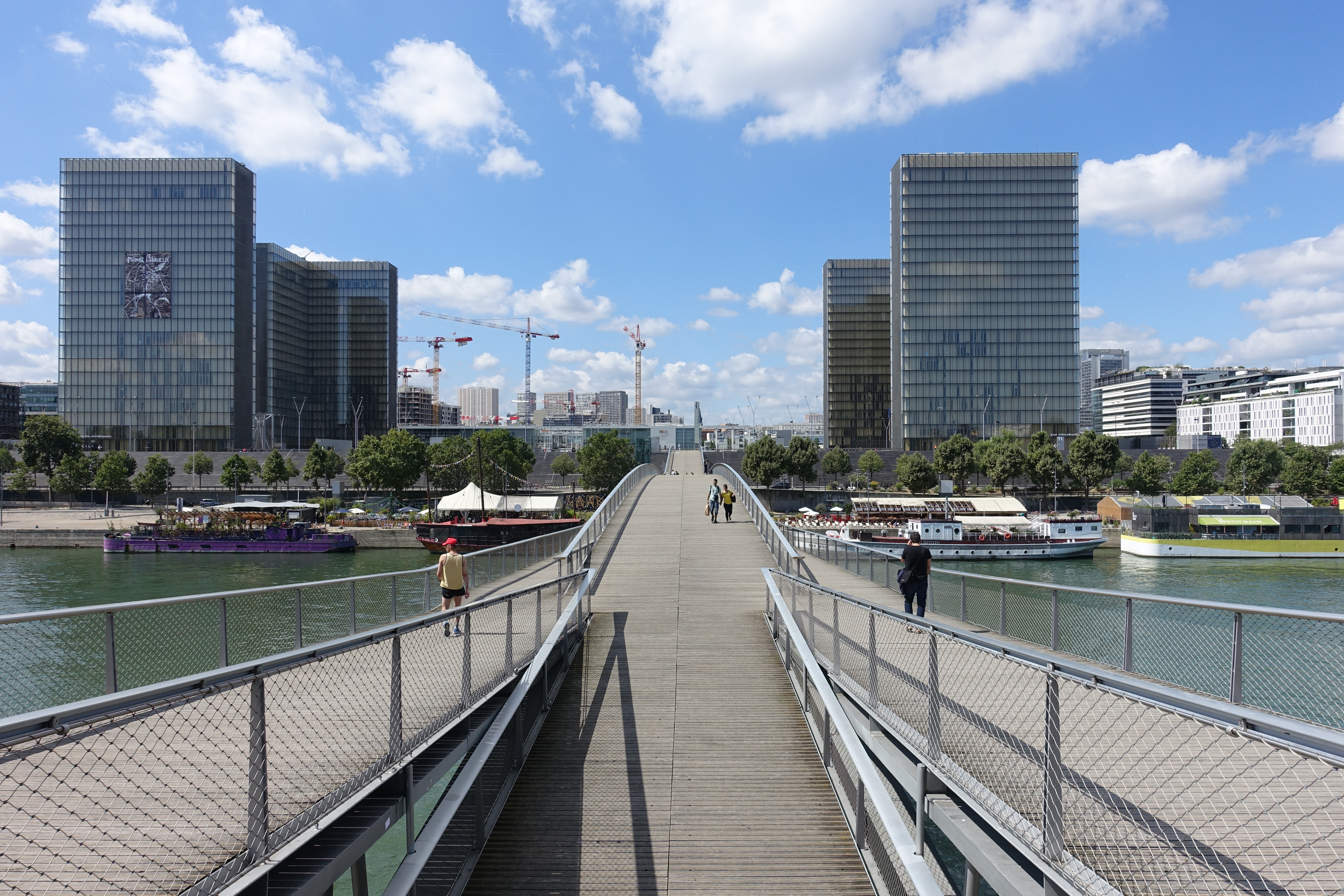
View from on the bridge

The passerelle is characteristic of its time and distinguishes itself from the three other footbridges that already cross the Seine in Paris (Passerelle Léopold-Sédar-Senghor formerly Passerelle Solférino, Pont des Arts, and Passerelle Debilly). The geometry of its members reduces shearing. This is a lens-shaped structure. The rotational anchorage on its supports brings its structural height back down to the different levels of the quais at either end. Its five crossings pass over the river without supports in water. It rejoins the streets on the high bank (directly into the parvise of the Bibliothèque François-Mitterrand (new Bibliothèque nationale de France), on the Rive Gauche (left bank), and directly into the parc de Bercy on the Rive Droite (right bank). It has double supports on the lower banks (quai François-Mauriac on the rive gauche, and quai de Bercy on the rive droite). A protected area mid-way at the central lens allows pedestrians to shelter from rain.

In March 2005, Bertrand Delanoë, the mayor of Paris, proposed naming it "Passerelle Simone de Beauvoir" and inaugurated the bridge on 13 July 2006, with de Beauvoir's adoptive daughter Sylvie Le Bon-de Beauvoir in attendance.

== Timeline ==
- September 2004: network deviation
- October 2004: foundations laid
- 2005 - 2006: links set up one by one
- June 2006: dynamic and static works
- July 2006: inaugurated and opened to the public

== Gallery ==
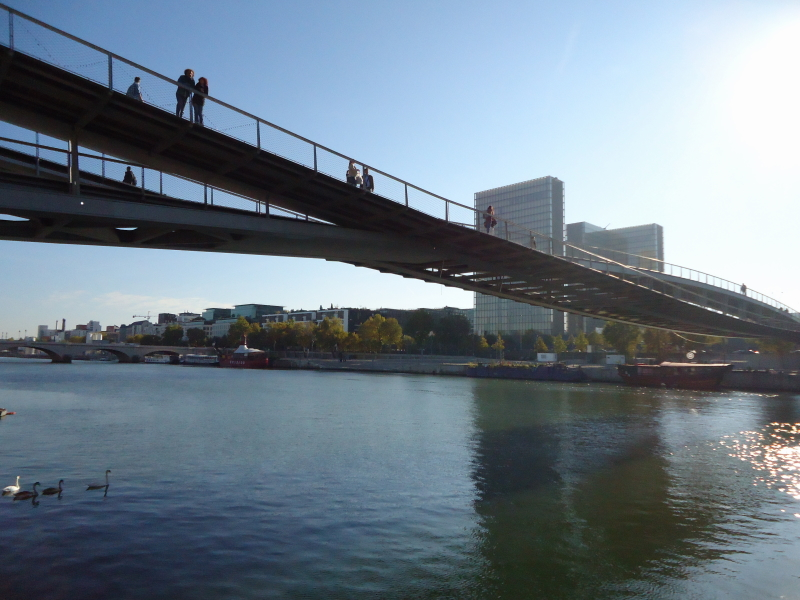

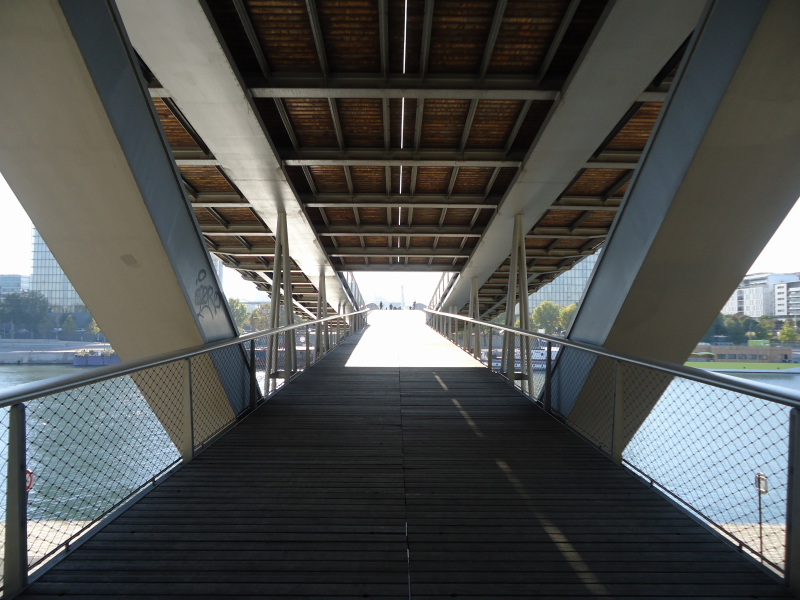

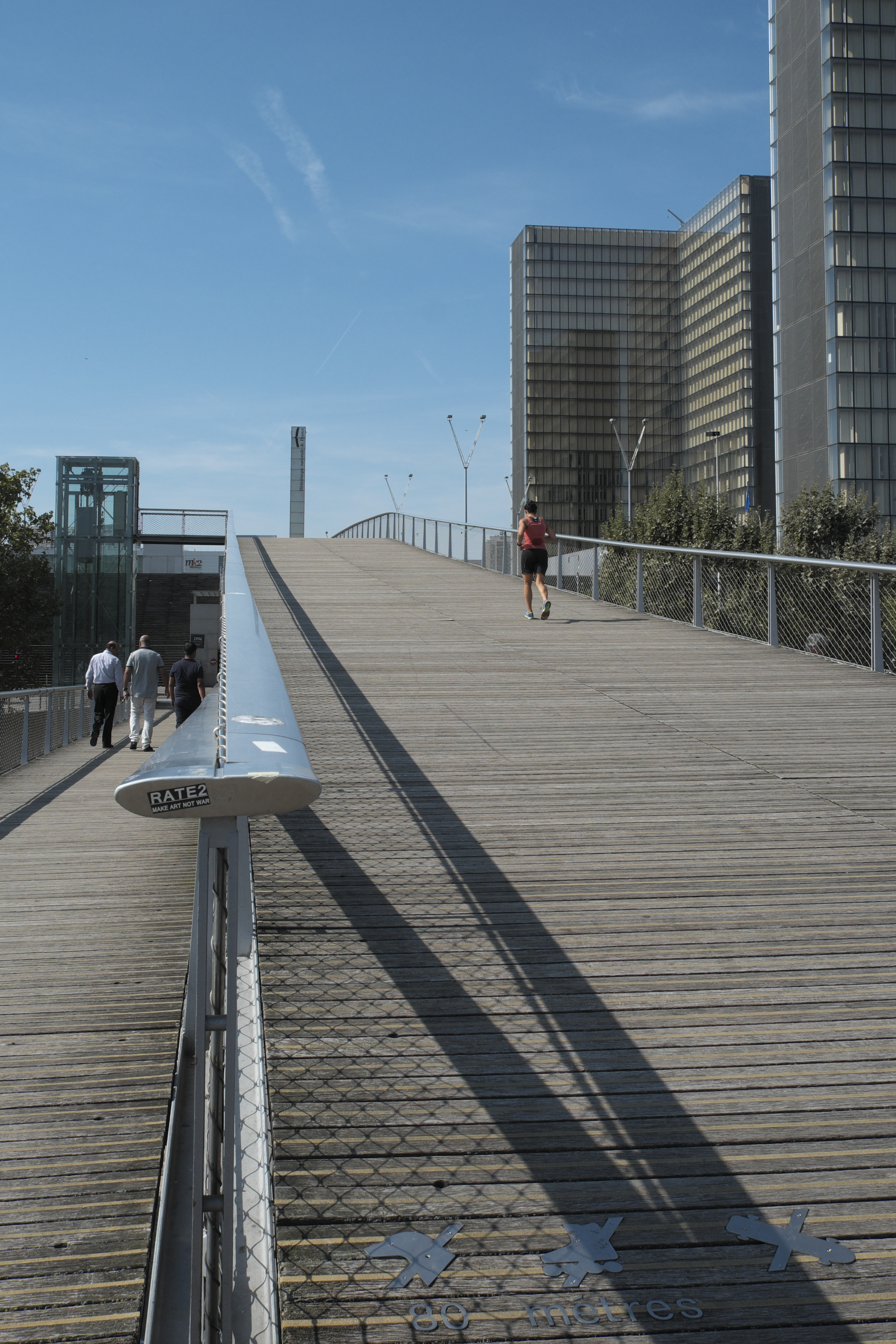

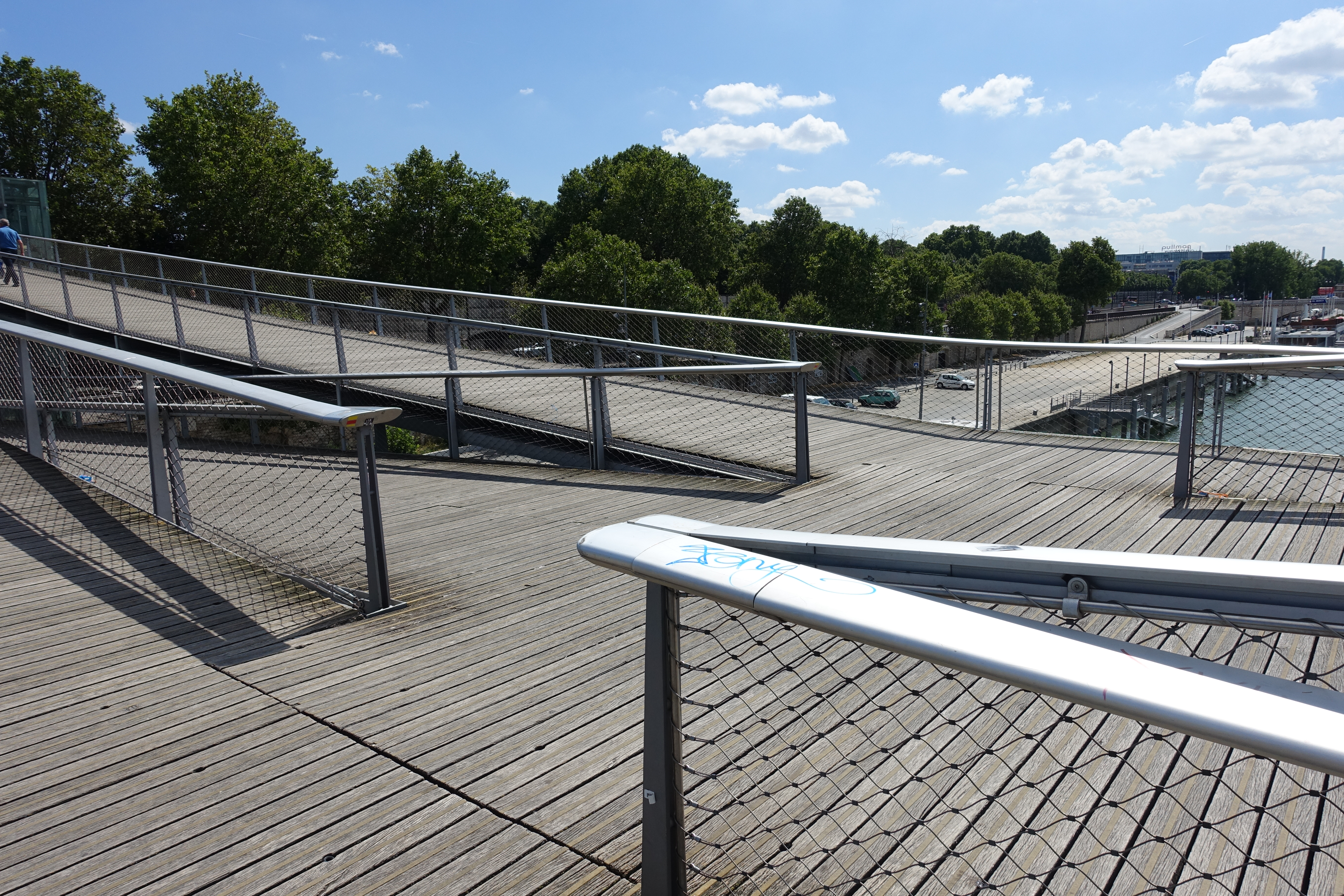

== See also ==
- List of crossings of the River Seine

== Bibliography ==
- Feichtinger Architectes, Passerelle Simone de Beauvoir, Paris, AAM Editions 2007, ISBN 978-2-87143-175-6
