= Pont Charles-de-Gaulle =

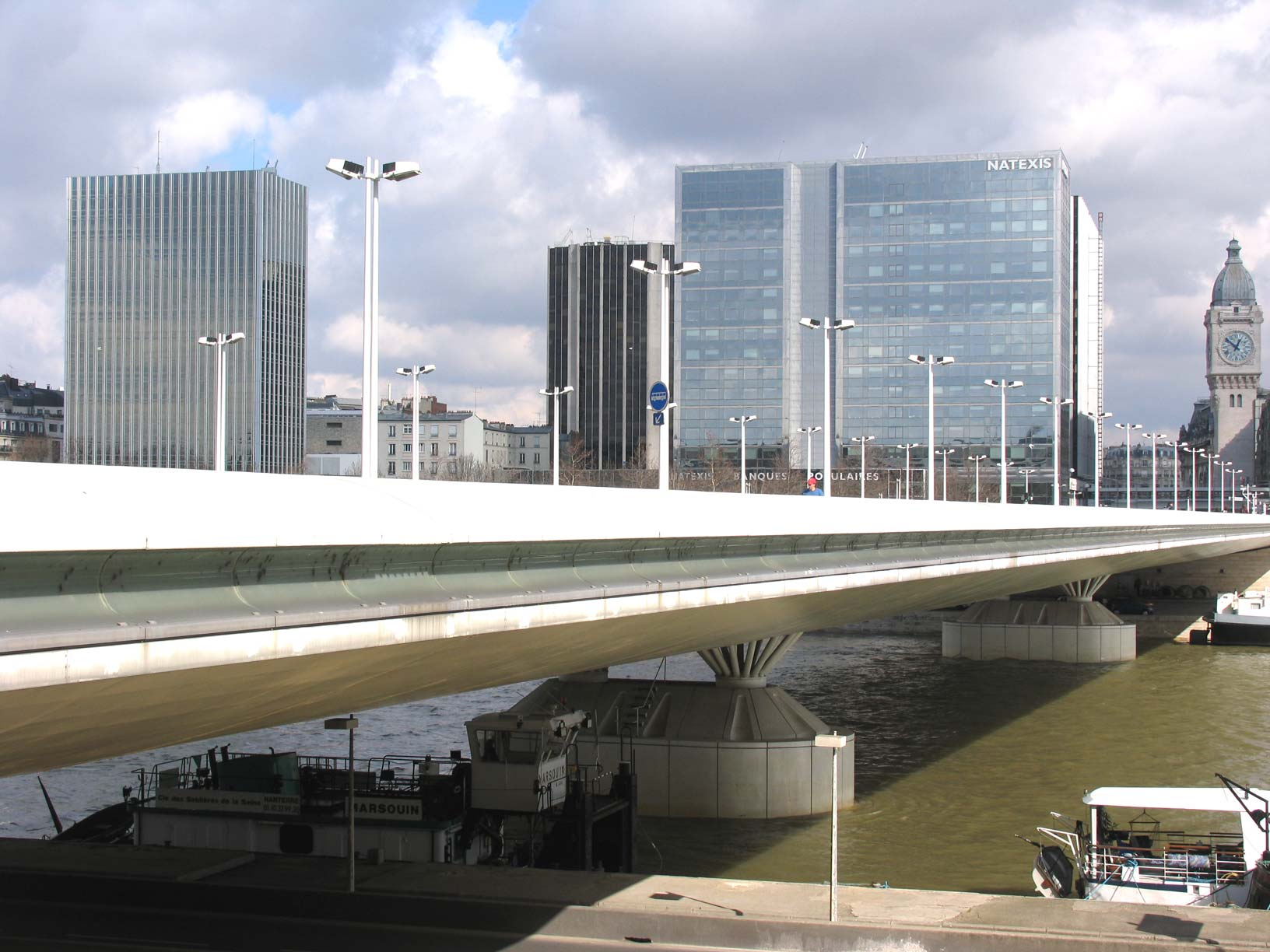
- Charles de Gaulle Bridge
- Coordinates: 48°50′35″N 02°22′12″E
- Carries: Pedestrians, Vehicles and Cycles
- Crosses: Seine
- Locale: Paris, France
- Official name: Pont Charles-de-Gaulle
- Maintained by: Civil Service
- Next upstream: Pont de Bercy
- Next downstream: Viaduc d'Austerlitz

Characteristics
- Design: Girder Bridge
- Total length: 207.75 m (681 ft)
- Width: 31.6 m (104 ft)

History
- Opened: 1996

Location
- Interactive map of Pont Charles-de-Gaulle

The Pont Charles-de-Gaulle (French pronunciation: [pɔ̃ ʃaʁl də ɡol], Charles-de-Gaulle Bridge) is a steel-reinforced concrete girder bridge straddling the river Seine in the eastern part of Paris. It is a one-way bridge carrying road traffic from the 13th arrondissement to the 12th arrondissement. Another one-way bridge further downstream, Pont d'Austerlitz, carries traffic in the opposite direction.

== History ==
In 1986, the Council of Paris (Conseil de Paris) decided to construct a new bridge between the Pont de Bercy and the Pont d'Austerlitz in southeast Paris, to imitate the design of the Pont d'Austerlitz. The aims of this project were three in number: (1) to ease the traffic on the Pont d'Austerlitz, the most heavily trafficked bridge in the capital; (2) to connect the new Bibliothèque nationale de France (also known as the François Mitterrand Library) to the district of Bercy on the Right Bank of the Seine; and (3) to establish a direct link between the Gare de Lyon and the Gare d'Austerlitz.

A Europe-wide competition was held in 1987 to determine the best project design. At the conclusion of the competition, the concept set forth by Louis Arretche and Roman Karasinski was chosen for the bridge. The rationale for this choice was that it did not detract from the aesthetic exterior of the Viaduc d'Austerlitz, a structure further downstream, and that it discreetly preserved the existing view of the river.

== Bridge structure ==
The bridge has a single steel deck measuring 270 m long and 35 m wide, and the shape of which resembles an aircraft wing. It is supported by two concrete piers. Linking each pier to the deck are two conical steel frames shaped like upside-down tents.

The bridge roadway (not including footpaths and cycle lanes) is 18 m wide and carries four lanes of northeast-bound traffic from the Left Bank to the Right Bank. Two cycle lanes to the upstream side of the bridge and two footpaths, one on each side of it, permit unmotorized traffic to cross.

== Access ==
Location on the Seine

Located near the Metro station: Gare d'Austerlitz.

== See also ==
- List of crossings of the River Seine
