= Pont de Tolbiac =

Bridge in Paris, France

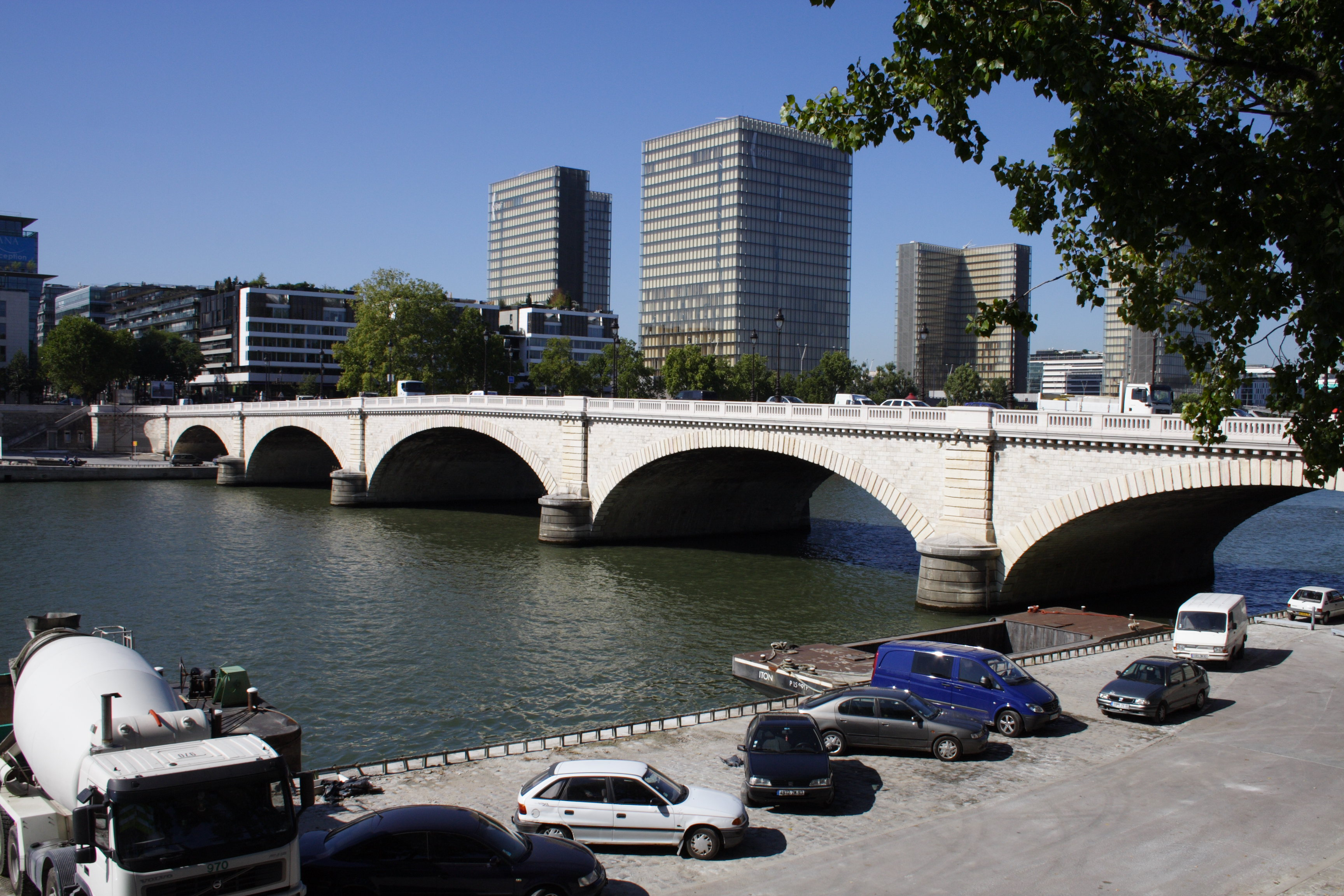
- Tolbiac Bridge
- Coordinates: 48°49′58″N 02°22′51″E
- Crosses: Seine
- Locale: Paris, France
- Next upstream: Pont National
- Next downstream: Passerelle; Simone-de-Beauvoir

Characteristics
- Design: arch bridge
- Total length: 168 metres (551 ft)
- Width: 20 metres (66 ft)

History
- Construction start: 1879
- Construction end: 1882
- Opened: 1882

Location
- Interactive map of Pont de Tolbiac

The pont de Tolbiac (French pronunciation: [pɔ̃ də tɔlbjak]) is a bridge across the Seine in Paris built between 1879 and 1882 by H.P. Bernard, and J.D.A. Pérouse. It crosses from the 12th to the 13th arrondissement, linking quai de Bercy to rue Neuve Tolbiac. Its nearest Paris Metro station is Cour Saint-Émilion.

== History ==
Location on the Seine

The pont de Tolbiac was built in a wave of urbanisation of eastern Paris in the second half of the 19th century. The decision to build it was made in 1877 by a vote of the municipal council, to create an intermediate crossing in the long space between the existing Pont National and Pont de Bercy. The city financed the works, which began in 1879. It was hit by a downed British plane in 1943. In the 1990s, it became the location for techno raves.

== Architecture ==
The total length of 168 metres (551 ft), five elliptical arches, 28m, 35m and 32m openings.

== See also ==
- List of crossings of the River Seine
