= Choisy-le-Roi bridge =

Choisy-le-Roi bridge Pont de Choisy
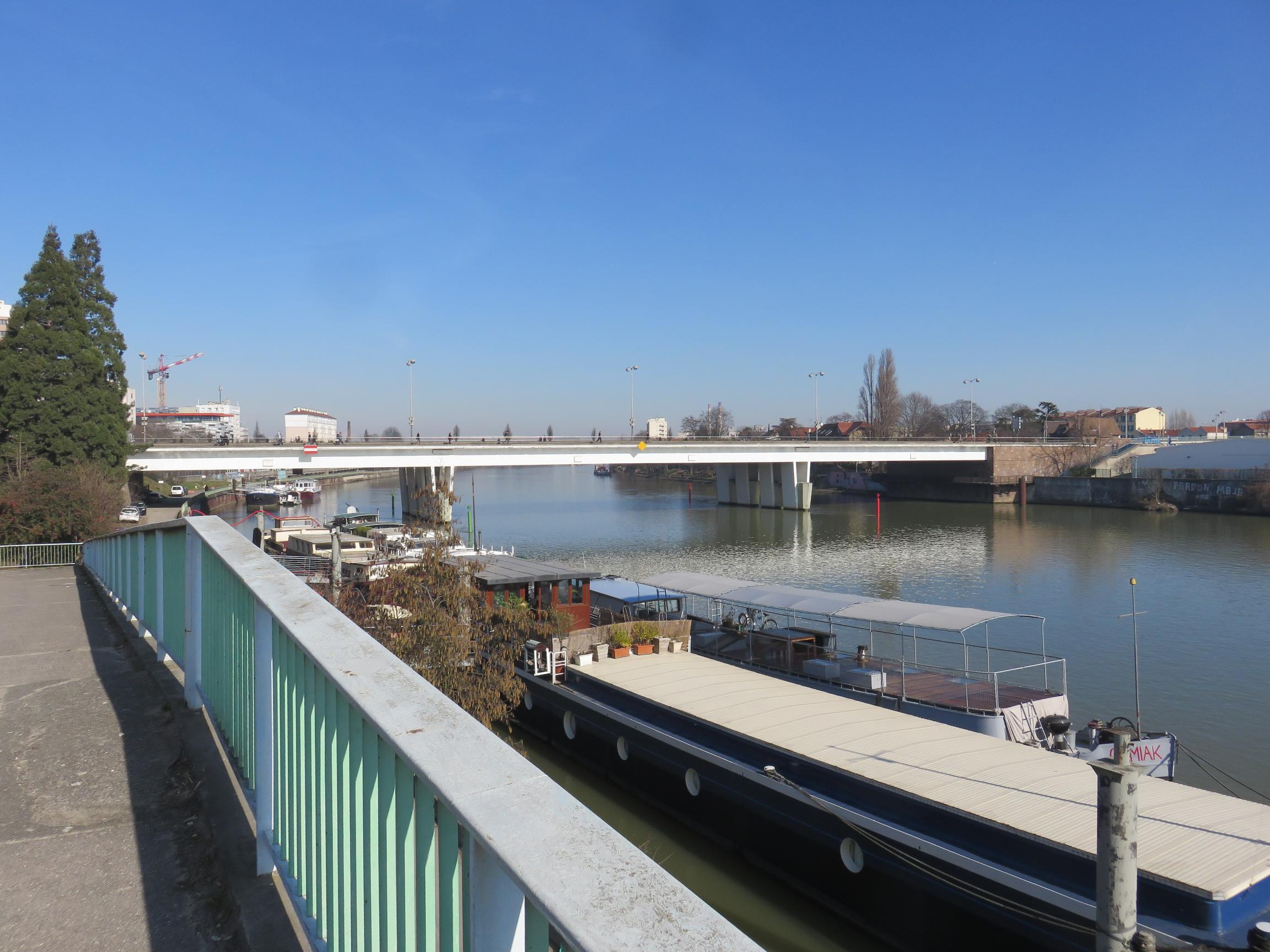
- Coordinates: 48°45′59″N 2°24′44″E
- Crosses: Seine
- Locale: Choisy-le-Roi

Characteristics
- Total length: 131 m (430 ft)
- Longest span: 55 m (180 ft)
- No. of lanes: 4

The Choisy-le-Roi bridge (French: Pont de Choisy) cross the Seine at Choisy-le-Roi. It is located near the Choisy-le-Roi station, on the route of the former RN 186 and the Trans-Val-de-Marne (TVM).

== History ==
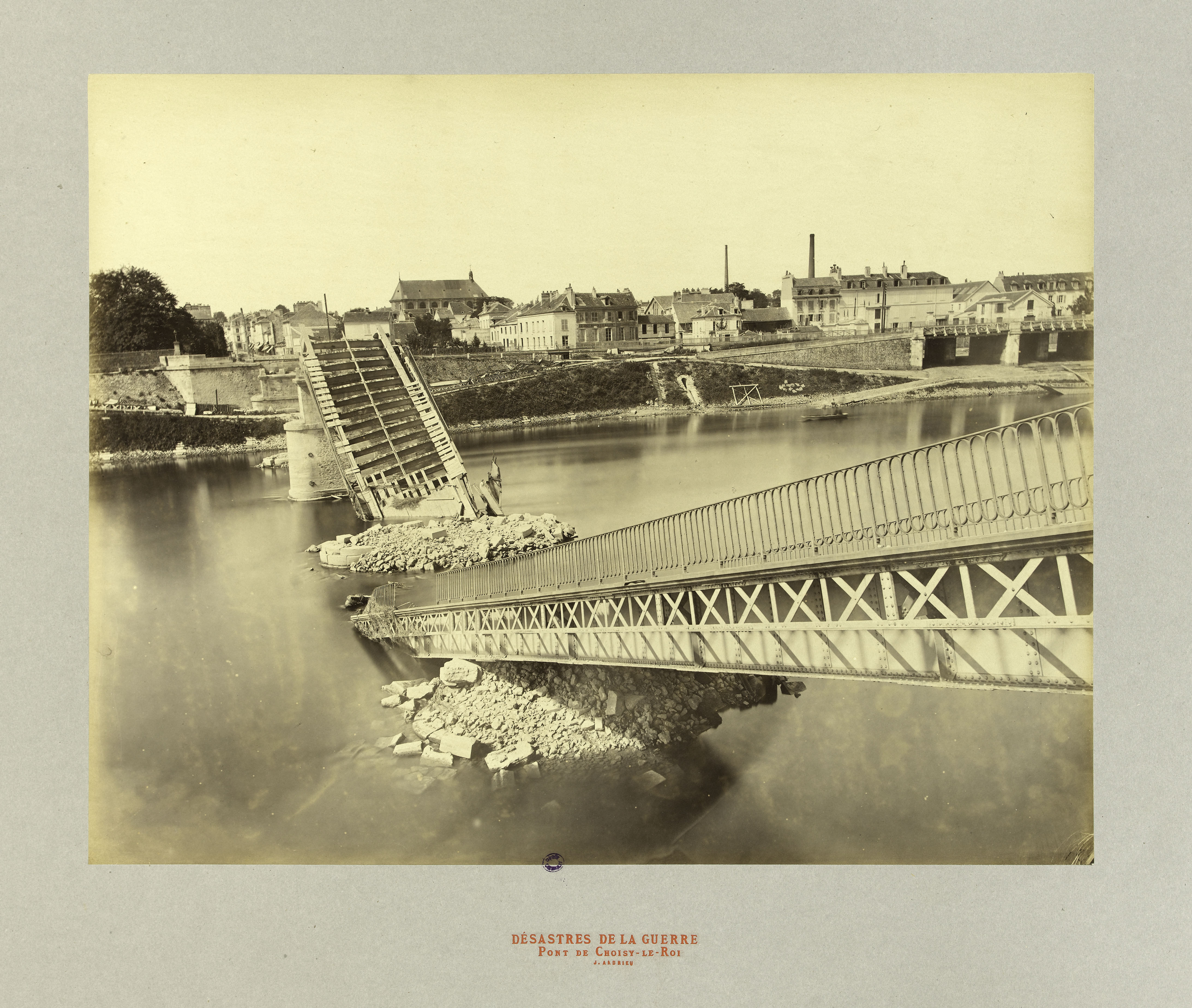
The Choisy-le-Roi bridge during the Paris Commune, photograph by Jean Andrieu, 1871

A first bridge was built in 1809 by Davia. It was destroyed during the war of 1870, then rebuilt.

The current box girder bridge was built by the Campenon-Bernard company between August 1962 and August 1965. It was designed by Albert Grégoire, chief architect of civil buildings and national palaces, and its construction was entrusted to Jean Muller and Jacques Mathivat under the direction of Jean Chaudesaigues.

The bridge was built in prestressed concrete by symmetrical cantilevering using prefabricated voussoirs with mating joints bonded in place with epoxy resin when the prestressing cables were tensioned. This is the first application of this construction method in France.

The bridge is 131 m long in three spans of 38 m, 55 m and 38 m. It consists of two parallel decks 14 m wide. Each deck is placed on piers composed of flexible walls which allow the voussoir to be embedded on the pier while allowing longitudinal movement due to creep and shrinkage and temperature variations.

Between the end of 2017 and the beginning of 2019, work was carried out to widen the bridge, notably allowing the installation of a cycle bridge.
