= Viaduc d'Austerlitz =

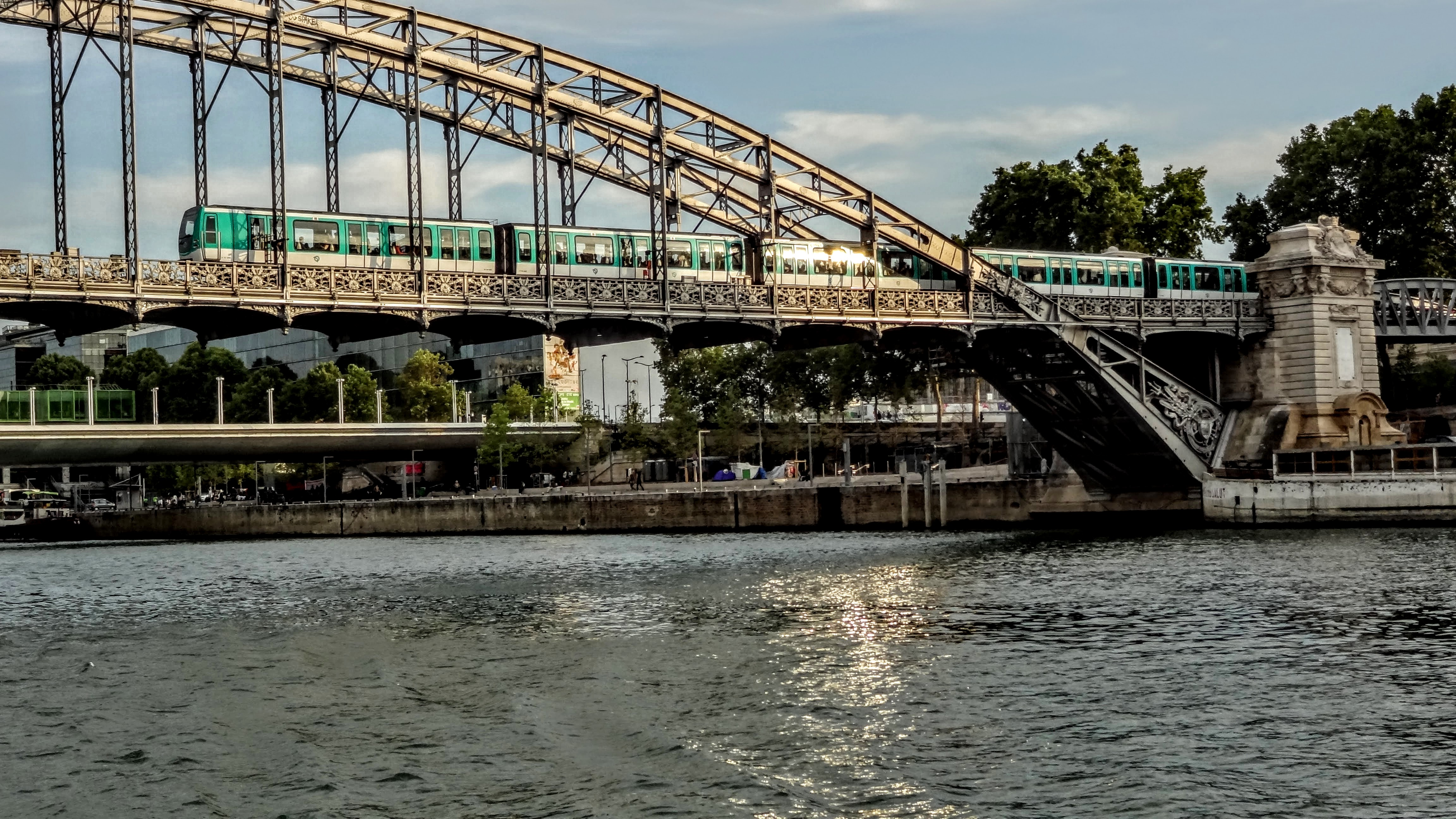
- MF 01 running on the bridge
- Coordinates: 48°50′37″N 02°22′04″E
- Carries: Paris Métro
- Crosses: Seine
- Locale: Paris, France
- Maintained by: Transit Authority of Paris
- Next upstream: Pont Charles-de-Gaulle
- Next downstream: Pont d'Austerlitz

Characteristics
- Design: Arch bridge, suspended deck
- Longest span: 140 metres

History
- Opened: 1904

Location
- Interactive map of Viaduc d'Austerlitz

Viaduc d'Austerlitz (English: Austerlitz Viaduct) is a single-deck, steel arch, rail bridge that crosses the Seine in Paris. It is used solely by Line 5 of the Paris Métro. It links Gare d'Austerlitz on the Rive Gauche to Quai de la Rapée on the other side of the river.

== History ==
Location on the Seine

Due to restrictions posed by navigational traffic, it was implausible to place a pier in the middle of the river. Therefore, in 1903, engineer Louis Biette, with the help of Fulgence Bienvenüe, conceptualized a metallic bridge that crossed the river in a single span.

It was designed by the architect Jean-Camille Formigé, who also designed the Pont de Bir-Hakeim, the greenhouses of Auteuil, and the park below the Basilica of Sacré-Coeur, and restored the Roman amphitheater in Arles and the Roman theater in Orange. Formigé decorated the steel arcs with marine-themed reliefs, including dolphins, seashells and seaweeds. Parts of the steel footings are etched with figures of the Parisian coat of arms, which symbolizes steadfastness.

Tasked with the bridge construction, the Levallois-Perret construction firm (Societé de Construction de Levallois-Perret) proposed a bridge with a span reaching 140 metres (460 ft), which was a record out of all the Parisian bridges at the time. Nowadays, this is only surpassed by Pont Charles-de-Gaulle. The viaduct consists of two reversed steel parabolic arcs joined together at three locations—two near the river banks and one exactly on the top of the arcs—and a single suspended deck about 8.5 m in width and hovering 11 m above water. As the deck is too close to the water, the arcs had to be elevated above the deck and affixed at each end to a giant stone abutment, 22 m x 18 m in dimension.

The approach to the bridge from the left bank (Gare d'Austerlitz) posed no particular issue to the construction project but it wasn't practical to remove the existing structures on the right bank to clear way for the bridge exit. Therefore, to circumvent this problem, instead of a straight exit leading out from the main bridge (like the one on the left bank), a curved structure was erected with riveted girders parallel to the rails. The helicoid ramp, which has a radius of approximately 75 m and a 40‰ gradient, bends in until the rails point downstream. The rails then disappear beneath la Place Mazas and re-emerge at the other end.

The construction of the viaduct began in 1903 and was completed by the following year. In 1936, the bridge body was consolidated to allow it to carry more load.

== Access ==
Located near the Metro station: Quai de la Rapée.

== See also ==
- List of crossings of the River Seine

== Bibliography ==
- Plum, Gilles (2014). Paris architectures de la Belle Époque. Éditions Parigramme. ISBN 978-2-84096-800-9.
- Cohen, J., Above Paris - The Aerial Survey of Roger Henrard (Dominique Carré éditeur, 2006 & Paris-Musées, 2006)
