= Pont National =

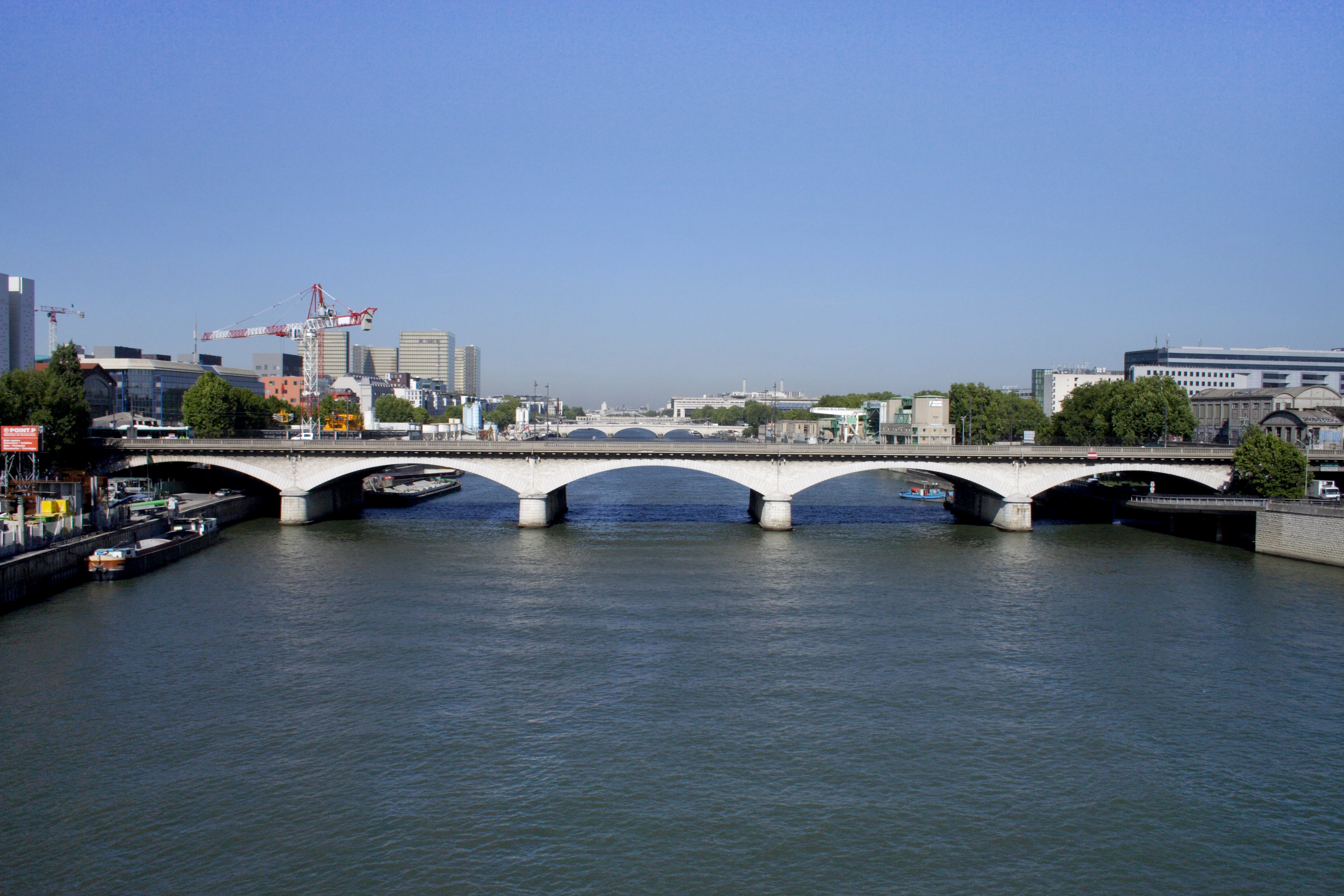
- National Bridge
- Coordinates: 48°49′42″N 02°23′16″E
- Crosses: Seine
- Locale: Paris, France
- Next upstream: Pont amont
- Next downstream: Pont de Tolbiac

Characteristics
- Design: arch bridge
- Total length: 188.5 metres (618 ft)
- Width: 34 metres (112 ft)

History
- Construction start: 1852
- Construction end: 1853
- Opened: 1853

Location
- Interactive map of Pont National

The pont National (French pronunciation: [pɔ̃ nɑsjɔnal]; named pont Napoléon-III from its construction until 1870) is a road and rail bridge across the Seine in Paris, to the east of the 12th and 13th arrondissements. With a total length of 188.5 metres (618 ft), it is made up of 5 masonry arches. Its rail part carries the Petite Ceinture, now disused, and its road part links boulevard Poniatowski to boulevard Masséna. Its nearest Paris Métro stations are Porte de Charenton and Cour Saint-Émilion.

== History ==
Location on the Seine

It was built between 1852 and 1853 as a railway bridge (to allow the Petite Ceinture line to cross the river) and to link the "enceintes" on the two sides of the river. Its architects were E. Couche, Petit, Gaspard, and Netter. Its width was doubled with an addition on the upstream side in 1936.

== See also ==
- List of crossings of the River Seine
