= Pont amont =

Upriver Bridge
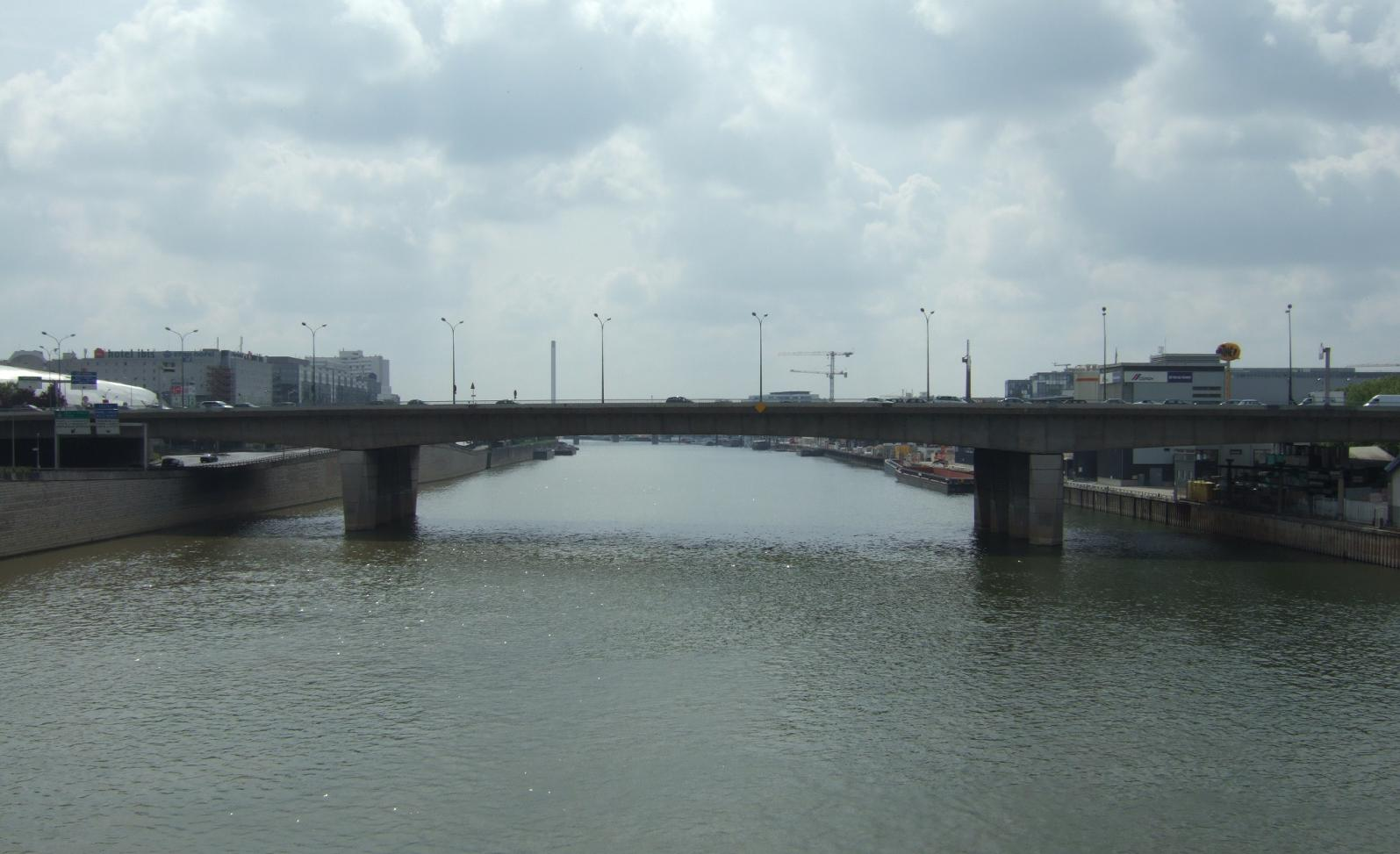
- Pont Amont
- Coordinates: 48°49′36″N 02°23′20″E
- Carries: Motor vehicles
- Crosses: The Seine River
- Locale: Paris, France
- Official name: None
- Next downstream: Pont National

Characteristics
- Design: Truss Bridge
- Material: Reinforced concrete
- Total length: 270m (886 feet)
- Width: 42 m (138 feet)
- Clearance below: 4.5 m (15 feet)

History
- Construction start: 1967
- Construction end: 1969

The Pont Amont (French pronunciation: [pɔ̃ amɔ̃], upriver bridge) is a bridge in Paris which carries the Boulevard Périphérique (Paris' inner ring road) over the Seine River. Entirely dedicated to motor traffic, it is the first bridge to be seen when following the Seine downstream into Paris. The bridge links the 12th and 13th arrondissements, near the Quai d'Ivry and the Quai de Bercy.

The bridge being 270 metres (890 ft) long, it is the second longest bridge in Paris, after its downstream counterpart, the Pont Aval, which also carries the Périphérique. Inaugurated in 1969, it has not been given an official name : its current designation (Pont Amont) is, much like for the Pont Aval, completely unofficial.

== See also ==
Location on the Seine

- List of crossings of the River Seine
