= Champagne-sur-Seine =

- Commune
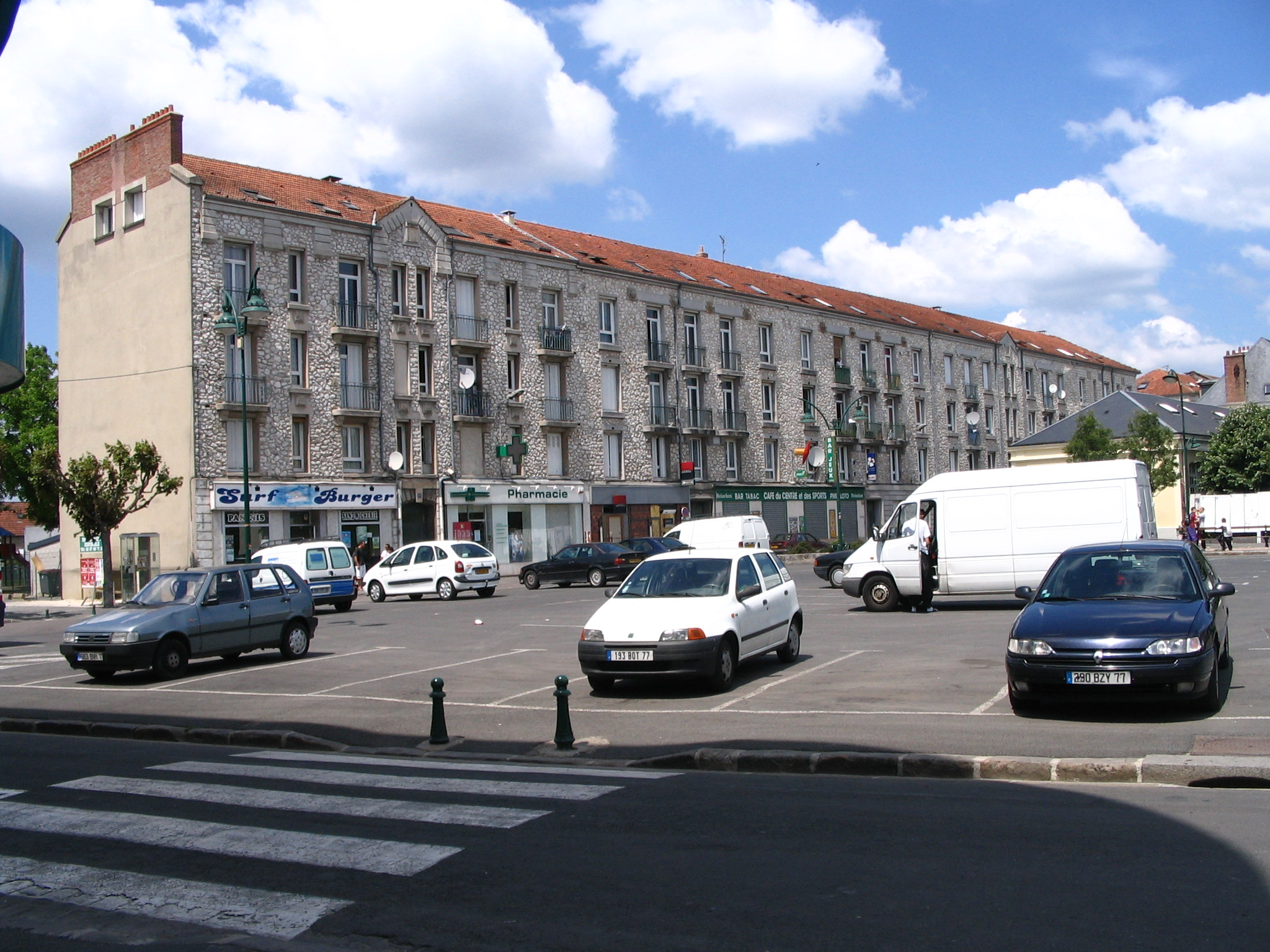
- The main square in Champagne-sur-Seine

- Coat of arms
- Location of Champagne-sur-Seine
- Location within France Location within Île-de-France (region)
- Coordinates: 48°23′44″N 2°47′45″E
- Country: France
- Region: Île-de-France
- Department: Seine-et-Marne
- Arrondissement: Fontainebleau
- Canton: Montereau-Fault-Yonne
- Intercommunality: CC Moret Seine et Loing

Government
  - Mayor (2024–2026): Didier Keriger
- Area^{1}: 7.28 km^{2} (2.81 sq mi)
- Highest elevation: 111 m (364 ft)
- Lowest elevation: 42 m (138 ft)
- Population (2023): 6,497
  - Density: 892/km^{2} (2,310/sq mi)
- Time zone: UTC+01:00 (CET)
  - Summer (DST): UTC+02:00 (CEST)
- INSEE/Postal code: 77079 /77430
- ^{1} French Land Register data, which excludes lakes, ponds, glaciers > 1 km^{2} (0.386 sq mi or 247 acres) and river estuaries.

Champagne-sur-Seine (French: [ʃɑ̃paɲ syʁ sɛn]; lit. 'Champagne-on-Seine') is a commune in the Seine-et-Marne department in the Île-de-France region in north-central France.

== Demographics ==
The inhabitants are called Champenois in French.

Historical population
Year	Pop.	±% p.a.
1968	5,298	—
1975	5,543	+0.65%
1982	5,406	−0.36%
1990	6,092	+1.50%
1999	6,594	+0.88%
2007	6,499	−0.18%
2012	6,381	−0.37%
2017	6,233	−0.47%
2023	6,497	+0.69%
Source: INSEE

== See also ==
- Communes of the Seine-et-Marne department
