= Passerelle Debilly =

Bridge in Paris, France

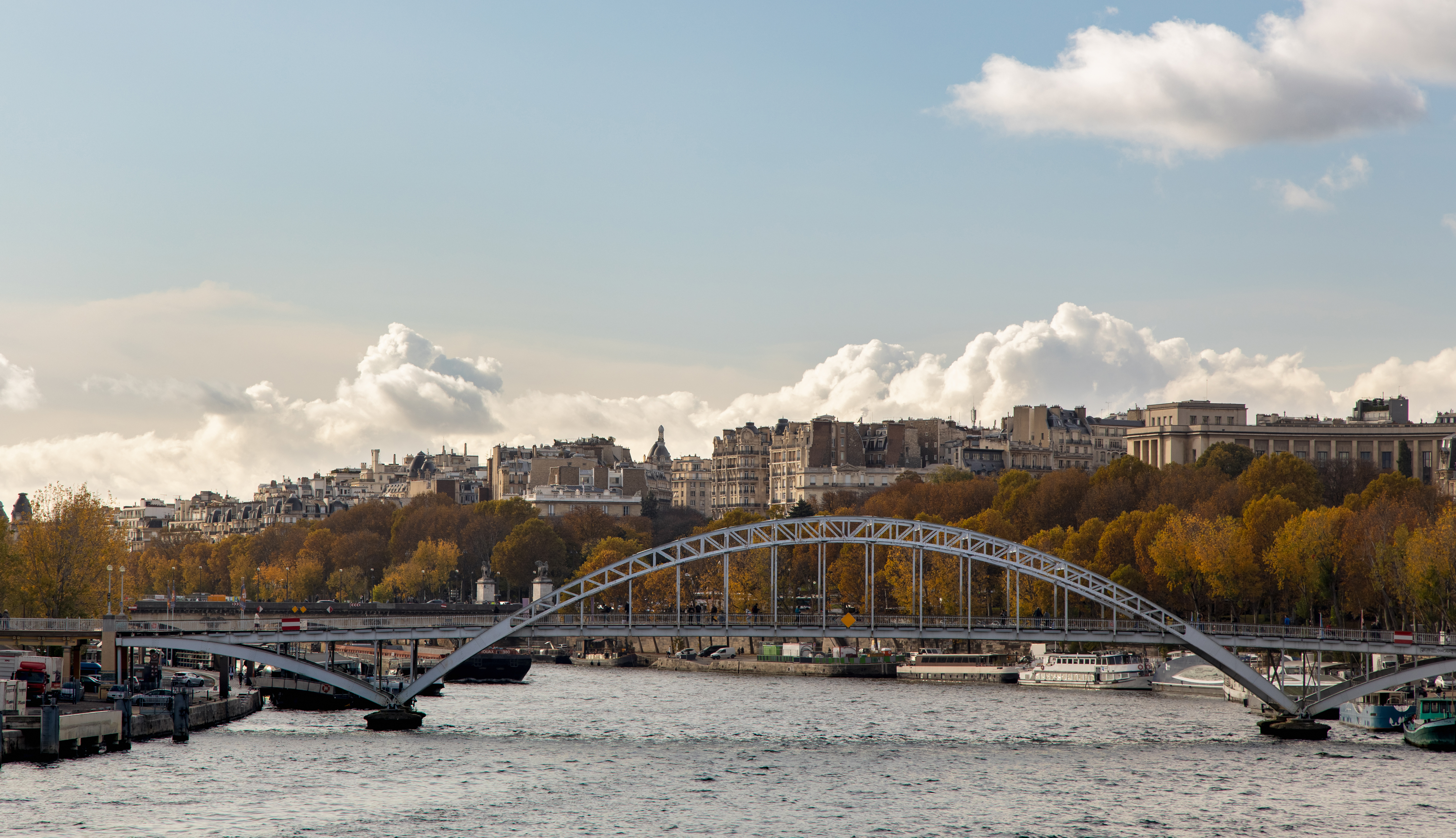
- Coordinates: 48°51′45.56″N 02°17′48.68″E
- Carries: Pedestrians
- Crosses: Seine
- Locale: Paris, France
- Official name: Passerelle Debilly
- Maintained by: Civil Service
- Next upstream: Pont de l'Alma
- Next downstream: Pont d'Iéna

Characteristics
- Design: Through arch bridge
- Total length: 125 m (410 ft)
- Width: 8 m (26 ft)

History
- Opened: 1900

Location
- Interactive map of Passerelle Debilly

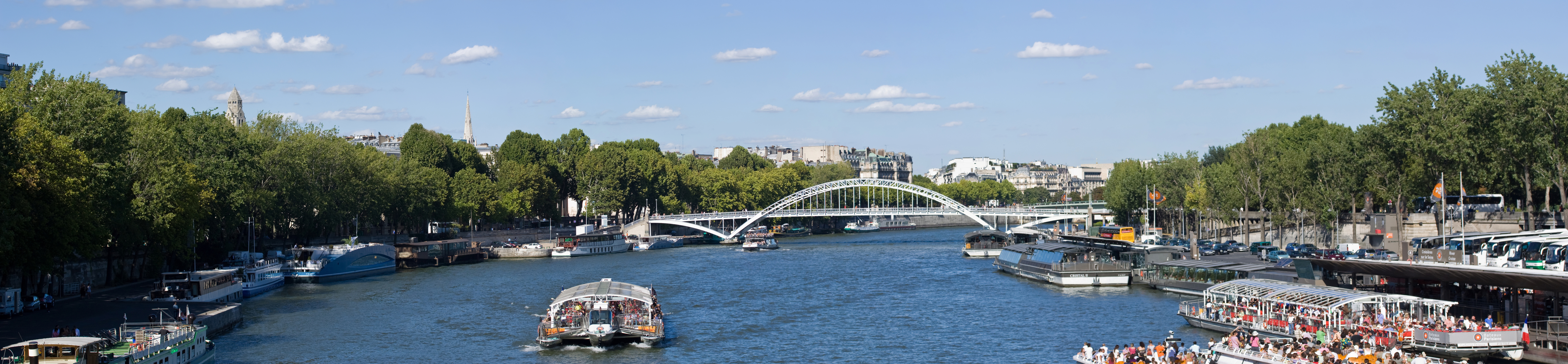
Passerelle Debilly from Pont d'Iéna

The Passerelle Debilly (French pronunciation: [pasʁɛl dəbili], 'Debilly Footbridge') is a through arch bridge in Paris spanning the Seine. It is a footbridge that connects the quai de New York to the quai Branly, close to the Eiffel Tower.

== History ==
In order to accommodate visitor traffic to the 1900 World's Fair across the Seine, the General Commissioner of the Exposition, Alfred Picard, approved the construction of a provisional footbridge opposite the Avenue Albert de Mun, to join the Army and Navy Halls to the exhibit recreating old Paris. Its architect, Jean Résal, also designed the Pont Alexandre III and the Viaduc d'Austerlitz.

The Debilly footbridge had, as well, a succession of provisional names. It was initially called passerelle de l'Exposition Militaire or passerelle de Magdebourg, only later passerelle Debilly, after General Jean Louis Debilly of the French First Empire who was killed in the Battle of Jena in 1806. The bridge became a permanent fixture from its original provisional status under the management of the City of Paris in 1906 after it was relocated opposite to the rue de la Manutention.

The footbridge is built on a metallic framework resting on two stone piers at the riverbanks, and decorated with dark green ceramic tiles arranged in a fashion that suggests the impression of waves. Along with the Eiffel Tower, this is the second metallic structure that stands as an attestation to the engineering achievements of its epoch. Nevertheless, in 1941, the Debilly footbridge was threatened with disappearance when the president of the architectural society characterized it as a forgotten accessory of a past event. As a contemporary of the Pont Alexandre III and the Austerlitz Viaduct, the Passerelle Debilly was eventually included in the supplementary registry of historical monuments in 1966.

The bridge was repainted in 1991 and its cladding resurfaced with hard tropical wood in 1997.

=== German diplomat ===
In 1989, a German diplomat working for the Secret Service of the Democratic Republic of Germany was found dead on this footbridge, several days after the Fall of the Berlin Wall. As it turned out, the footbridge was used as a secret gathering place for the secret service agents of East Germany during the Cold War. It is one of the reasons that filmmaker Brian De Palma shoot a scene of his thriller Femme Fatale on that footbridge in 2002.

== Access ==
Location on the Seine

The nearest metro station is Iéna, to the north west of the bridge, hence by foot heading east via Avenue du Président Wilson then south via Rue de la Manutention.

== Gallery ==
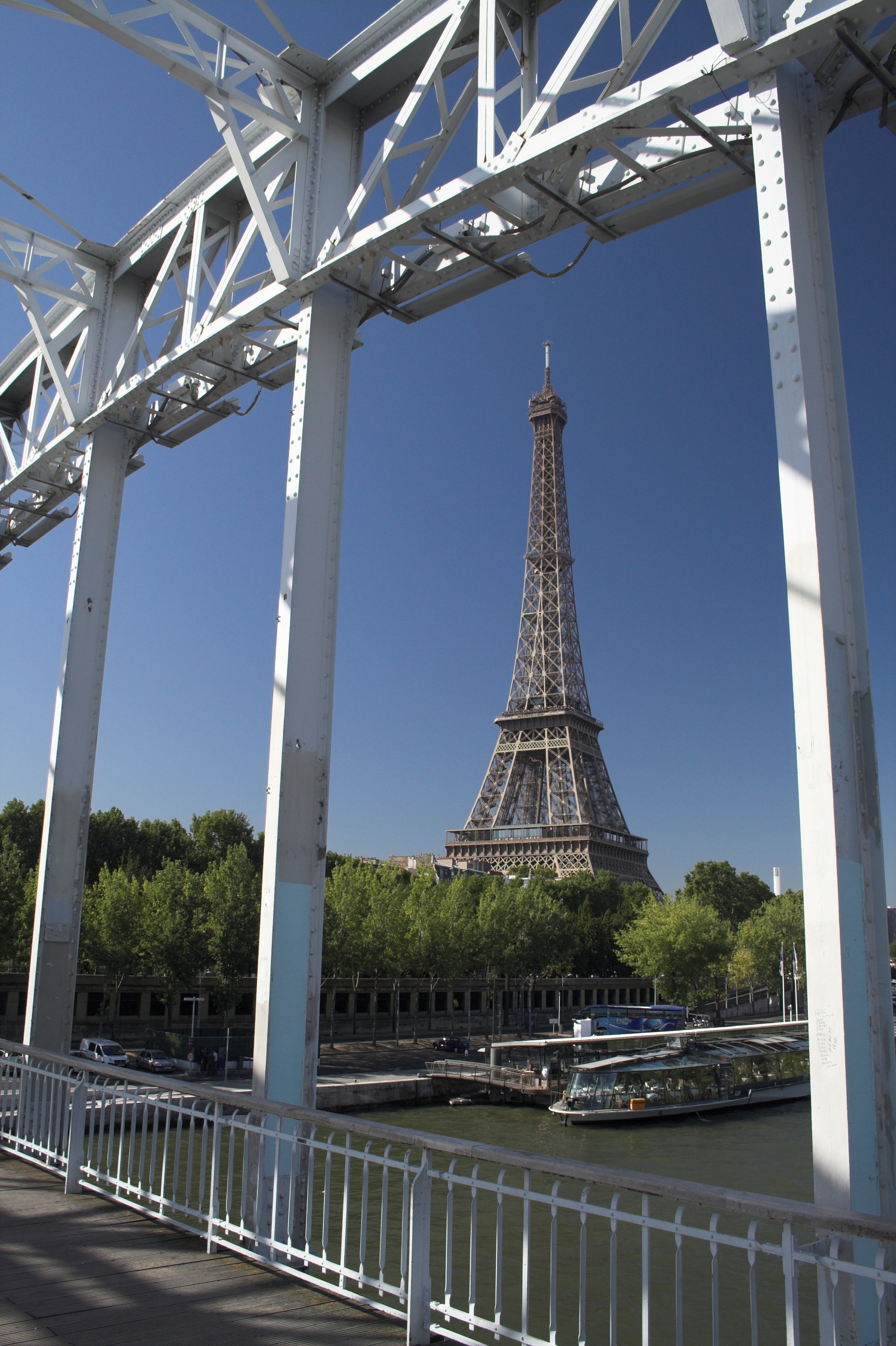
Eiffel Tower viewed from Passerelle Debilly

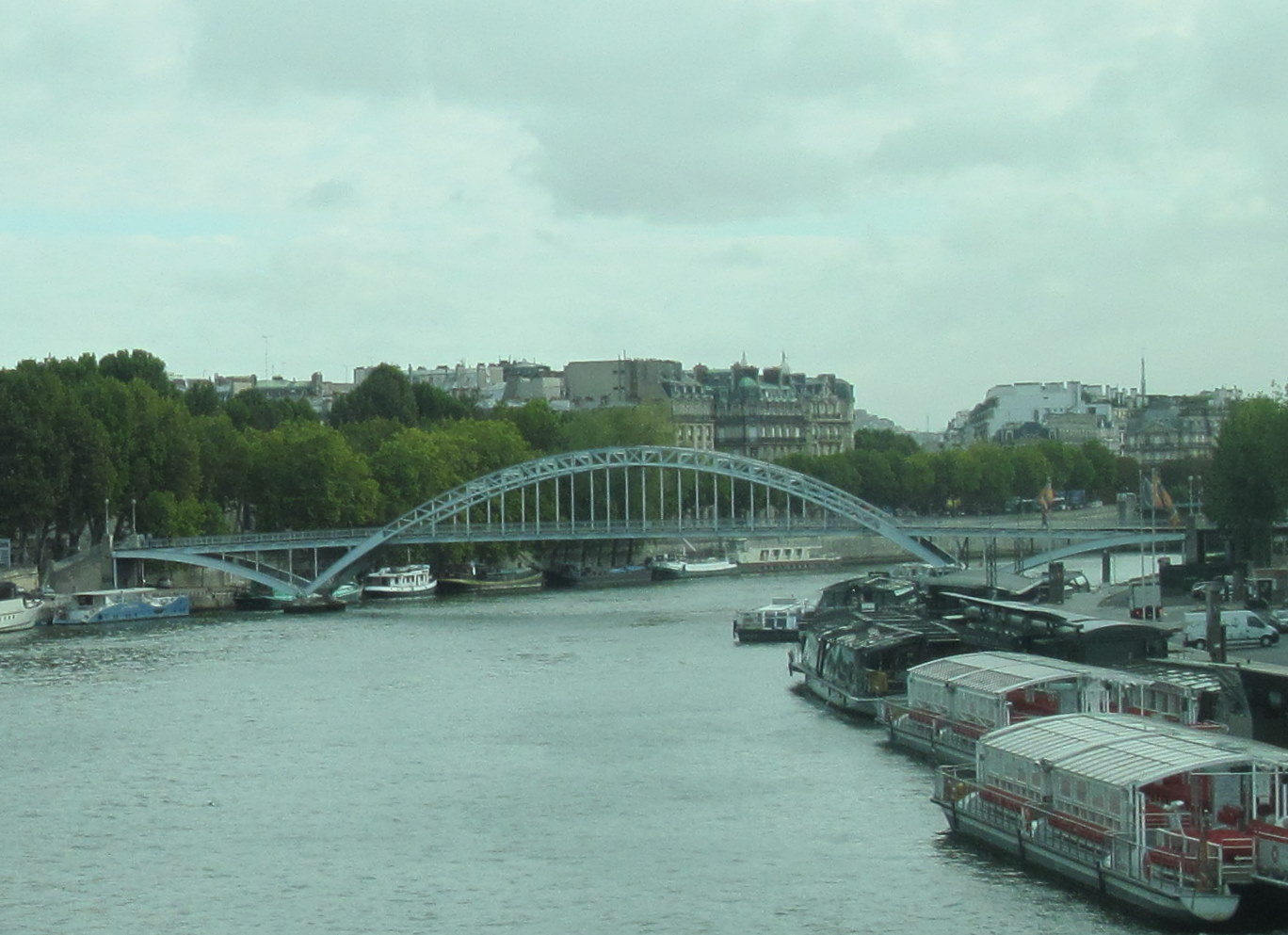
Passerelle Debilly from Iena

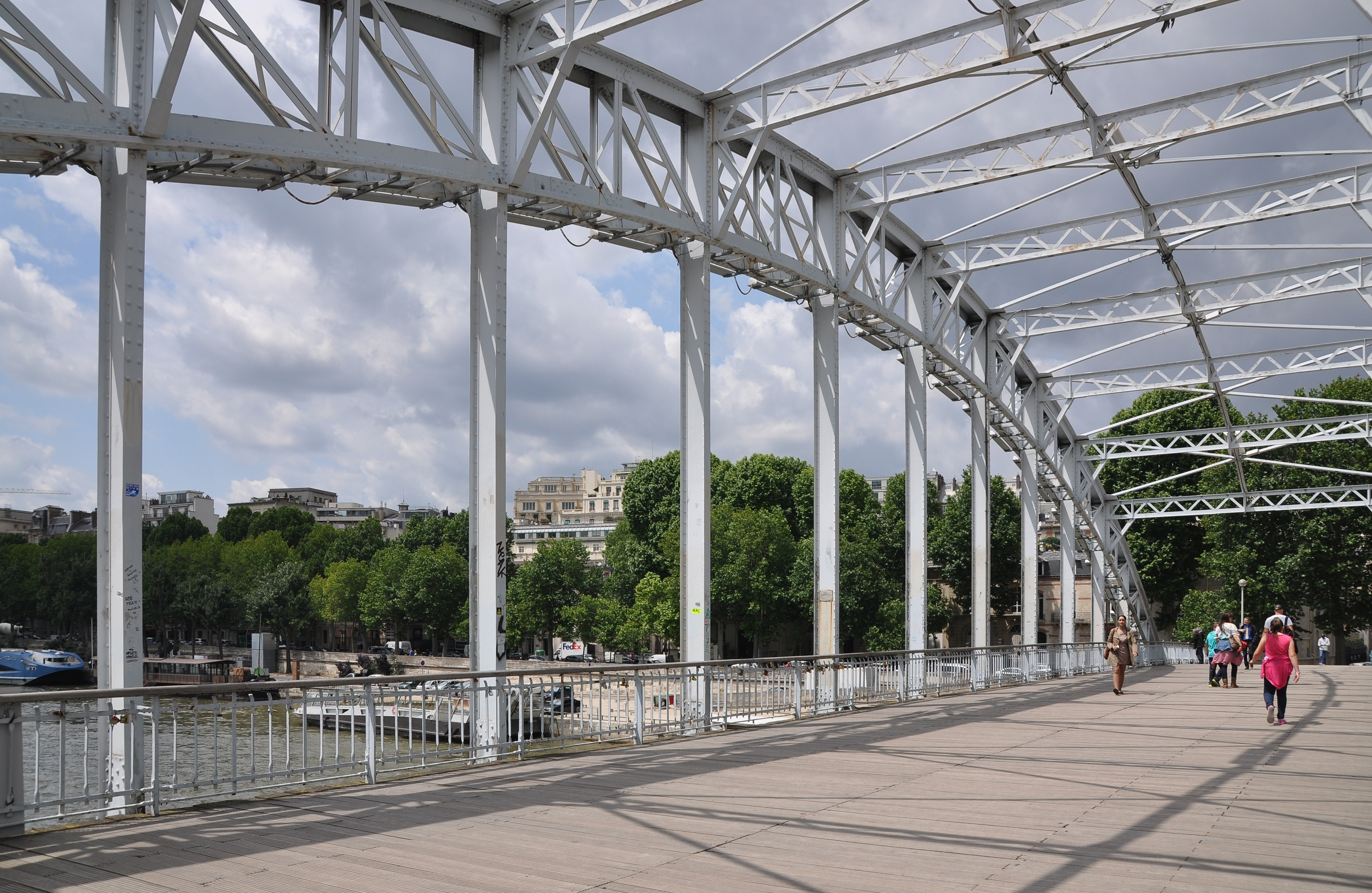
The interior of Passerelle Debilly

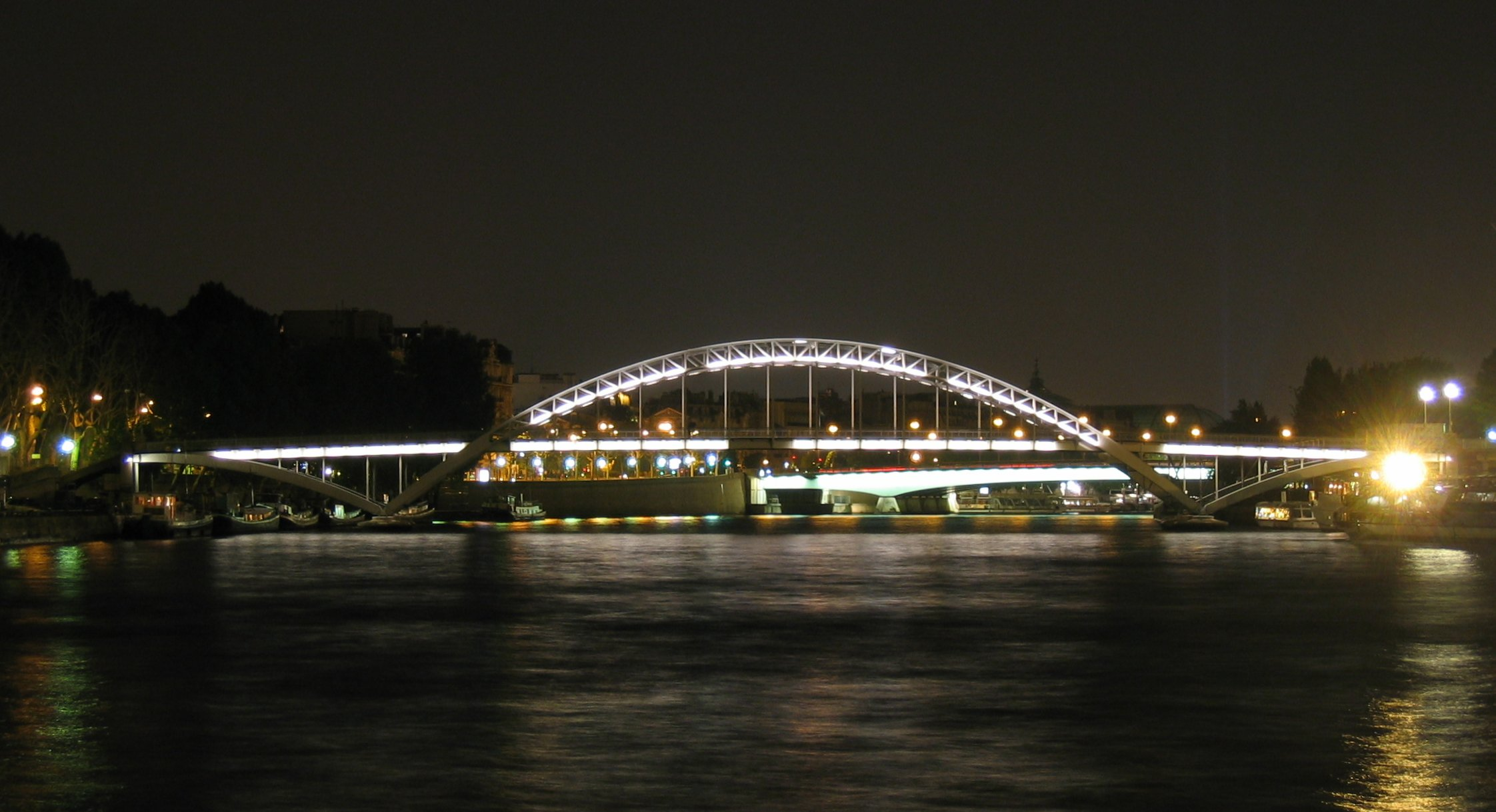
Passerelle Debilly at night

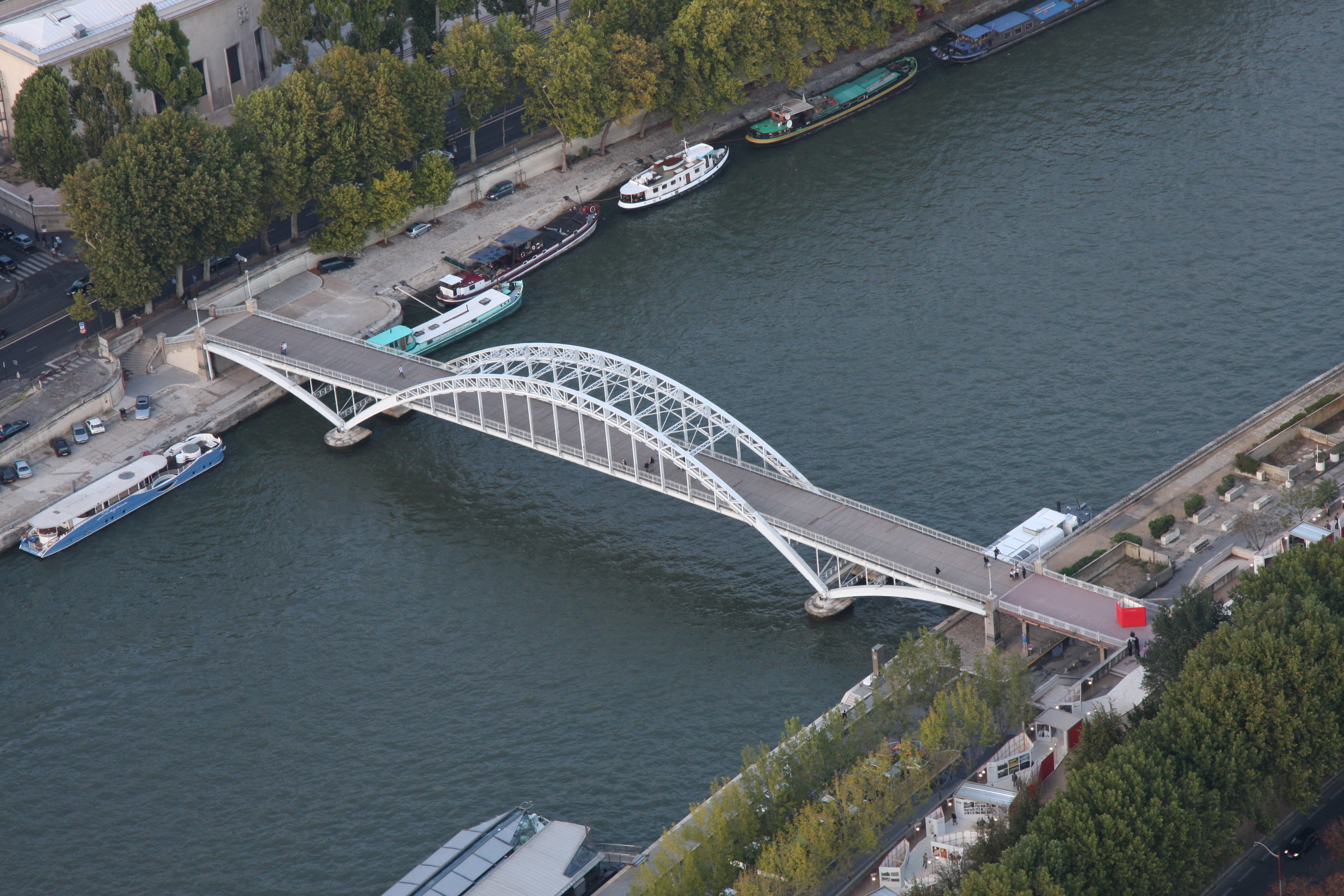
Debilly Footbridge from Eiffel Tower

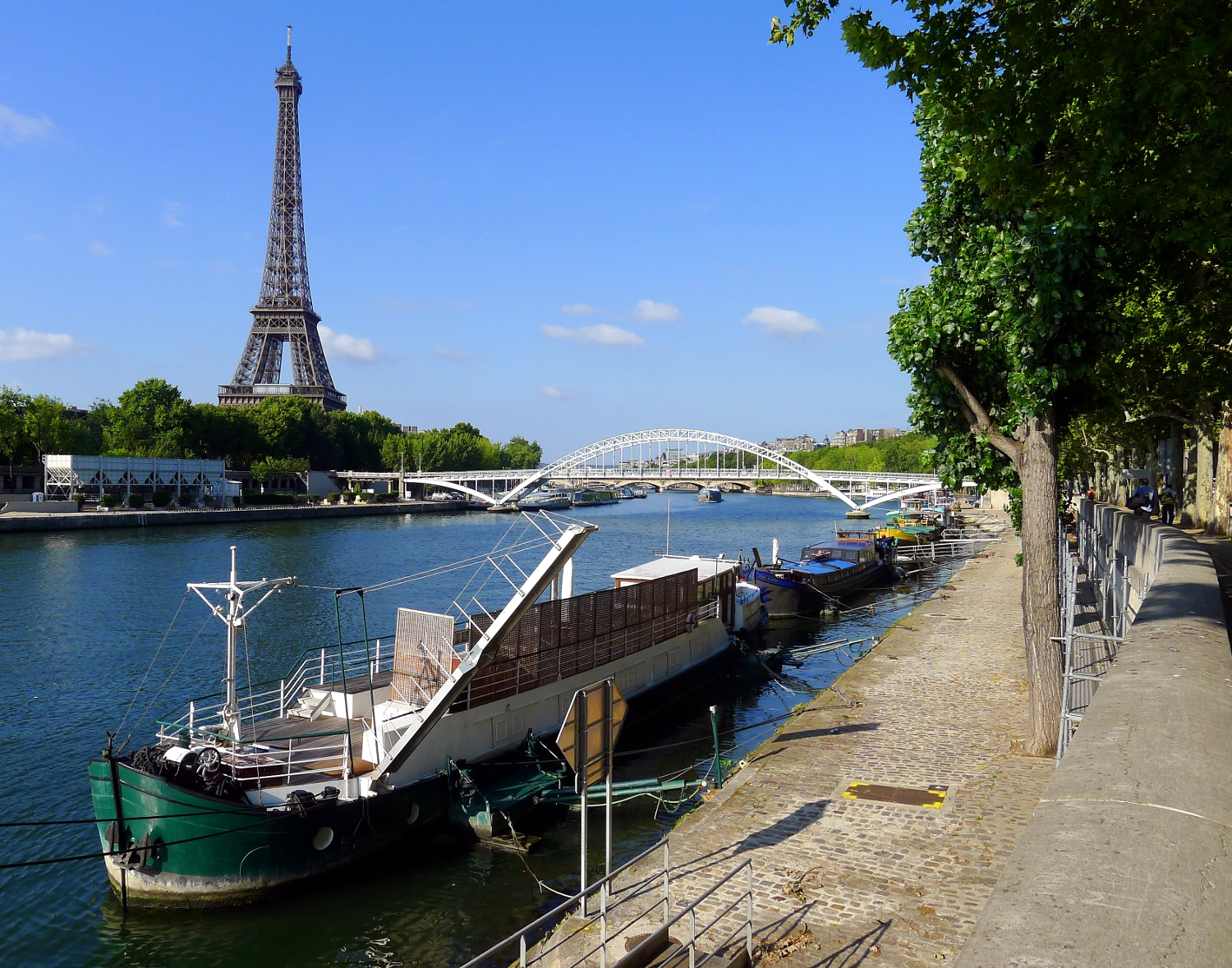
From Port Debilly.
