= Pont de Bercy =

Bridge in Paris, France

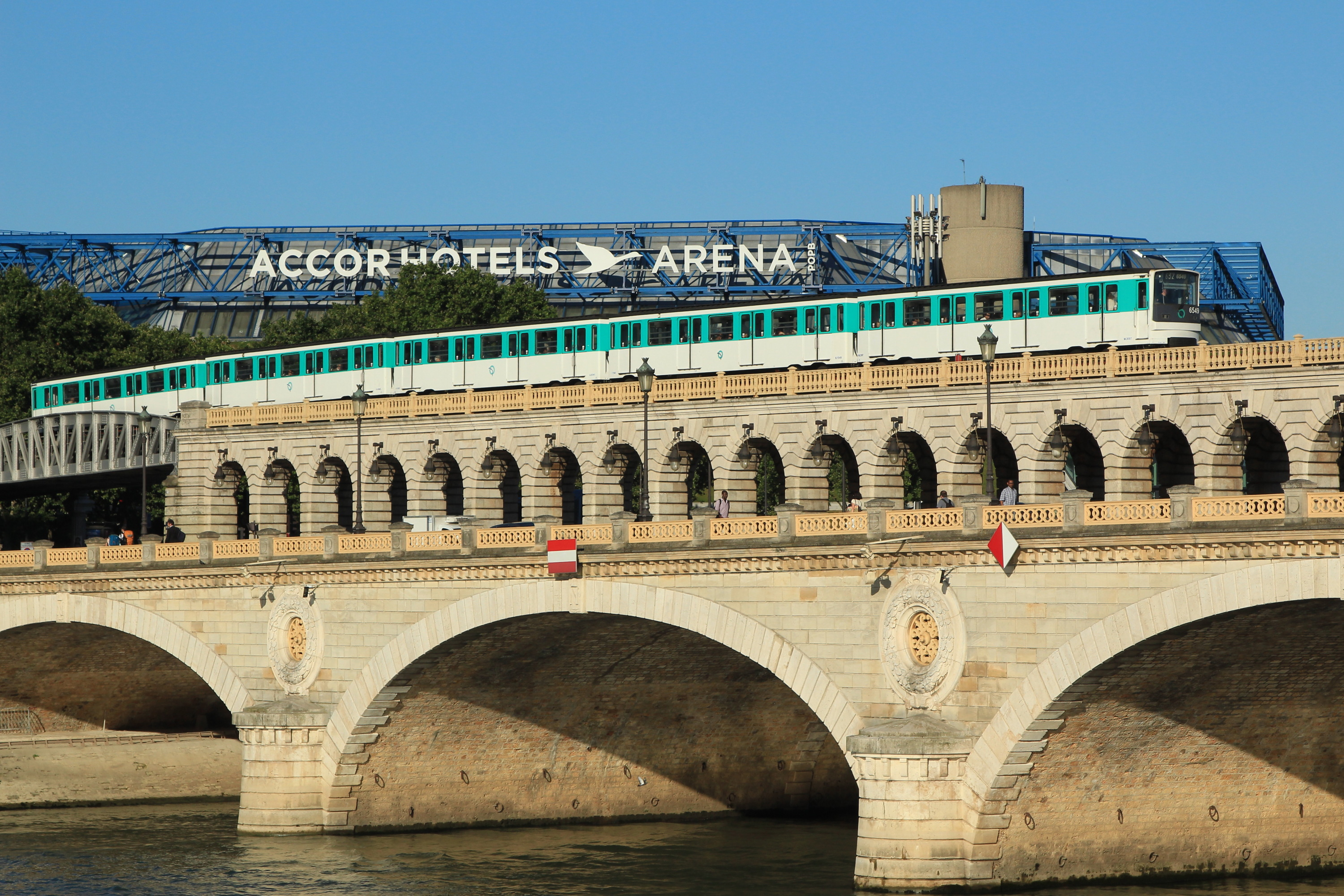
- Line 6 train on the Pont de Bercy
- Coordinates: 48°50′17″N 2°22′30″E
- Carries: Motor vehicles, Paris Métro Line 6
- Crosses: Seine
- Locale: Paris, France
- Next upstream: Passerelle Simone-de-Beauvoir
- Next downstream: Pont Charles-de-Gaulle

Characteristics
- Design: Stone and Reinforced Concrete
- Total length: 175 m (574 ft)
- Width: 40 m (130 ft)

History
- Construction start: 1863–1864; 1904; 1989–1991

Statistics
- Toll: Free both ways

Location
- Interactive map of Pont de Bercy

The Pont de Bercy (French pronunciation: [pɔ̃ də bɛʁsi], Bridge of Bercy) is a bridge over the Seine in Paris. It links the 12th and 13th arrondissement of Paris by extending the Boulevard de Bercy and Boulevard Vincent-Auriol. In addition to the roadway, the bridge also carries Line 6 of the Paris Métro, between Quai de la Gare station and Bercy station.

== History ==
Location on the Seine

The Pont de Bercy was built at the site of another bridge, a suspension bridge opened in 1832 to replace a ferry that had become overcrowded and thus exceeded its tonnage limit. The former bridge had a toll: one sou (5 centimes) for pedestrians, 3 sous per two-wheeled cabriolet (including persons transported) and 5 sous per car with four wheels attached to two horses. Between 1863 and 1864, it was replaced by a stronger stone structure.

In 1904, the bridge was enlarged by 5.5 metres (18 feet) to support Line 6 of the Paris Métro. In 1986, the decision was made to further enlarge the bridge in order to create three additional lanes for traffic. The winning bid proposed doubling the bridge by adding extensions perfectly symmetrical to the underground viaduct. Although identical in all respects to the original, the new addition is built of reinforced concrete and covered with a stone dressing. The work started in 1989 and the bridge was opened in 1992, effectively adding 16 metres (52 feet) for a total width of 35 metres (115 feet).

== In popular culture ==
The Pont de Bercy is referenced in the well-known song "Sous le ciel de Paris" (Under the sky of Paris) sung by Yves Montand, Edith Piaf and many others. The song mentions a philosopher sitting on the bridge, and two musicians playing there for a few onlookers.

== See also ==
- Pont de Bir-Hakeim
- List of crossings of the Seine
