= Rive Droite =

Part of Paris on the north bank of the Seine

The arrondissements of Paris, with the river Seine bisecting the city. The Rive Droite is the northern part.

The Rive Droite (French: [ʁiv dʁwat]; French for 'Right Bank') is most commonly associated with the river Seine in central Paris. Here, the river flows roughly westwards, cutting the city into two parts. When facing downstream, the northern bank is to the right, whereas the southern bank (or Rive Gauche) is to the left.

The Rive Droite's most famous street is the Champs-Élysées, with others of prominence being the Rue de la Paix, Rue de Rivoli, Avenue de l'Opéra and Avenue Montaigne. The President of France resides on the Rive Droite, at the Élysée Palace. Notable landmarks include the Louvre, Place de la République and Arc de Triomphe.

== See also ==
- Arrondissements of Paris
- Rive Gauche
- Bank (geography)
