= Pont Louis-Philippe =

Bridge in Paris, France

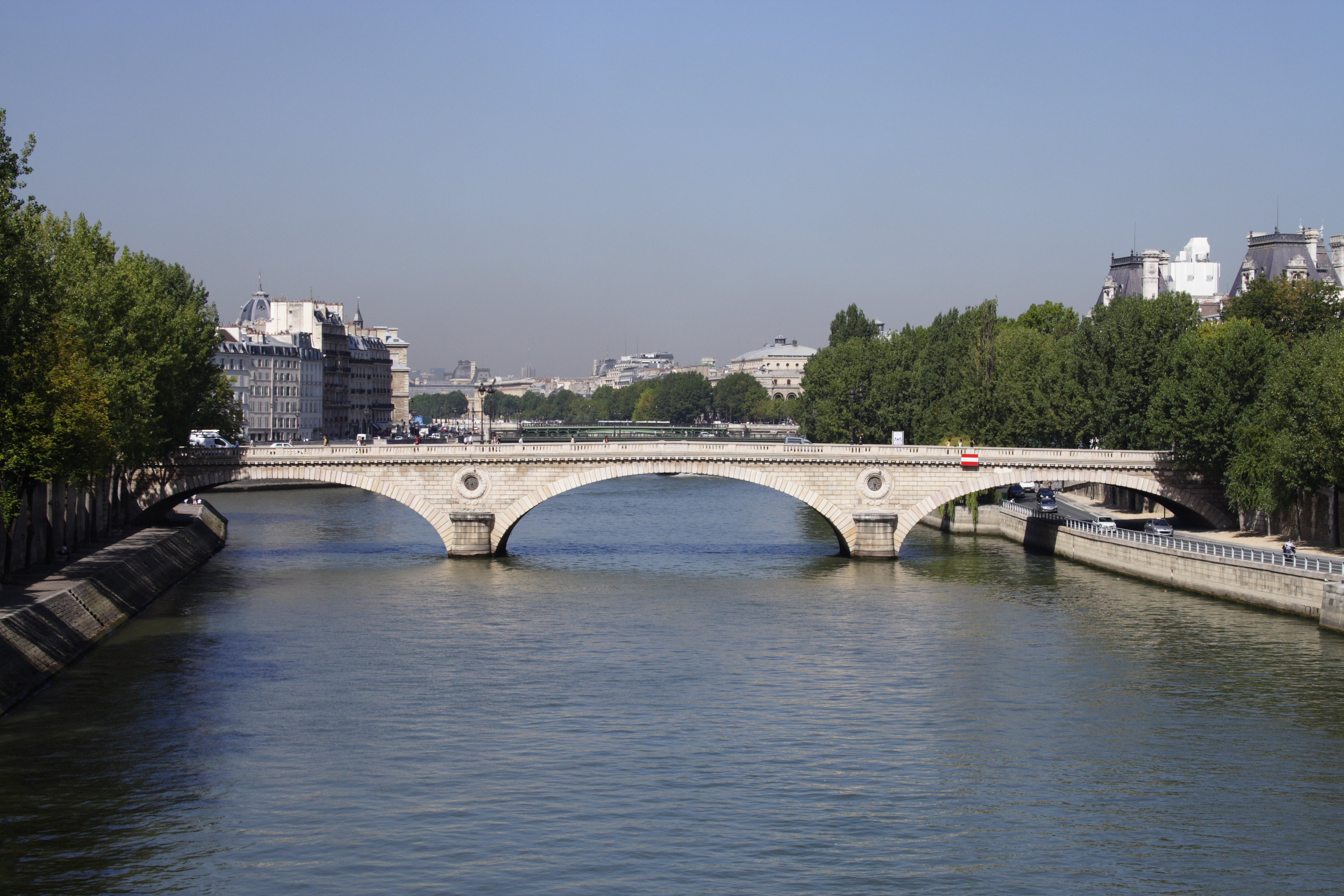
- Pont Louis-Philippe
- Coordinates: 48°51′14″N 02°21′16″E
- Carries: Motor vehicles, pedestrians, and bicycles
- Crosses: the River Seine
- Locale: Paris, France
- Official name: Pont Louis-Philippe
- Next upstream: Pont Marie
- Next downstream: Pont Saint-Louis; Pont d'Arcole

Characteristics
- Design: Arch Bridge
- Total length: 100 metres (330 ft)
- Width: 15.2 metres (50 ft)

History
- Construction start: 1860
- Construction end: 1862

Location
- Interactive map of Pont Louis-Philippe

The Pont Louis-Philippe (French pronunciation: [pɔ̃ lwi filip]) is a bridge across the River Seine in Paris. It is located in the 4th arrondissement, and it links the Quai de Bourbon on the Île Saint-Louis with the Saint-Gervais neighborhood on the right bank.

== History ==
On 29 July 1833, to celebrate his accession to the throne following the "Trois Glorieuses" (the three glorious days of the July Revolution), Louis-Philippe laid the first stone for a previously nameless suspension bridge, located on the extension of the Rue du Pont Louis Philippe. Built by Marc Seguin and his brothers, it crossed the Seine to the Île Saint-Louis. It was opened to traffic one year later, on 26 July 1834. After the French Revolution of 1848 (during which the bridge and its tollhouses were burnt down), it was restored and renamed "Pont de la Réforme", a name it held until 1852.

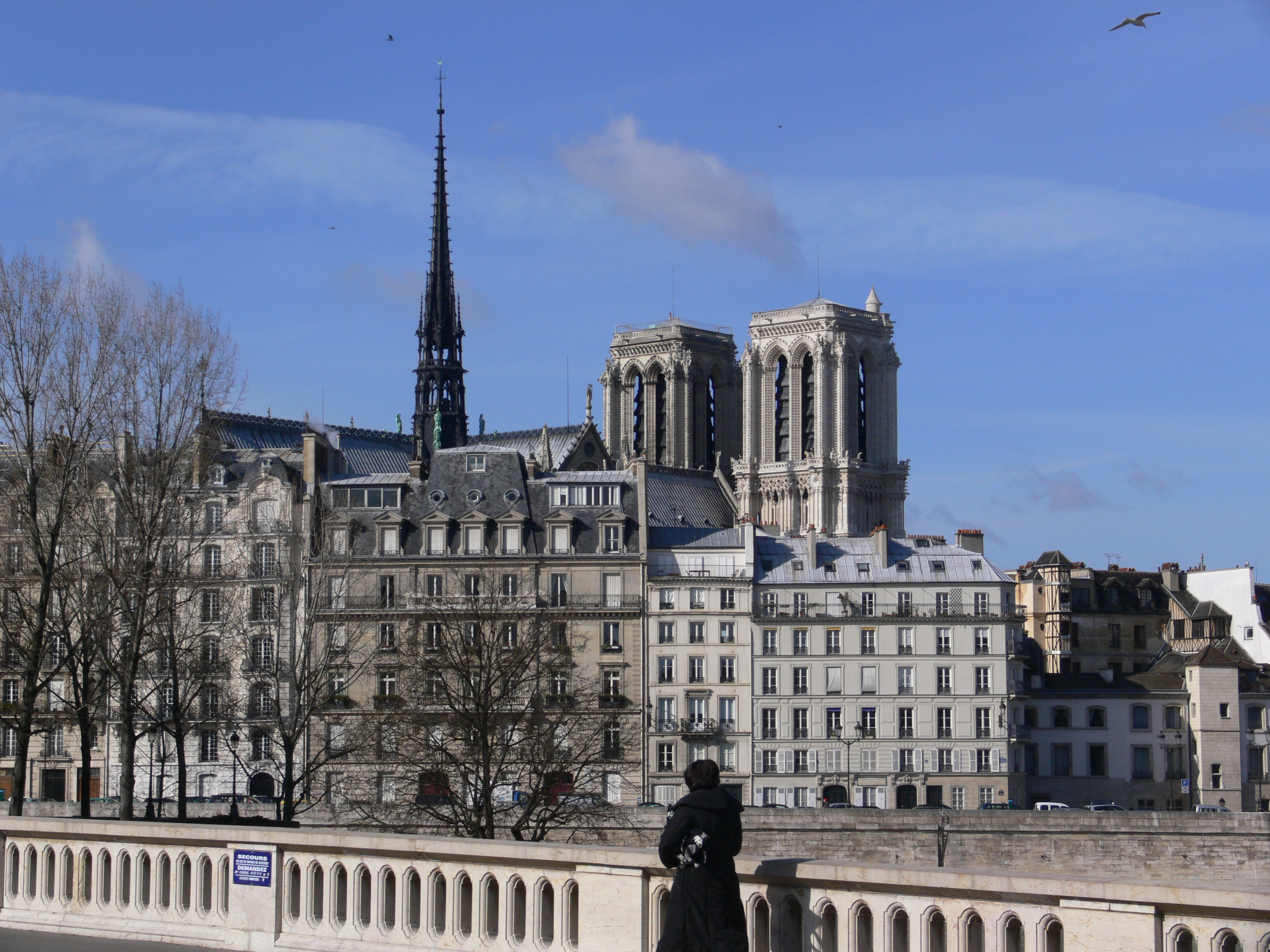
View of Notre Dame from the Pont Louis-Philippe

In the face of increased traffic (the tollhouses had not been restored), it was demolished to be replaced by the present structure in 1860. This new structure, an arch bridge, was built by the engineers, Edmond-Jules Féline-Romany and Jules Savarin, between August 1860 and April 1862, a little further upstream than its predecessor. The Pont Louis-Philippe was inaugurated in April 1862. The spandrels above the four-metre-wide piers in the Seine are decorated with stone laurel wreaths surrounding metallic rosettes.

The only modification since then (unlike its much-modified contemporary, the Pont de Bercy) was the replacement of the stone guardrails (badly damaged by pollution) with replica railings in 1995.

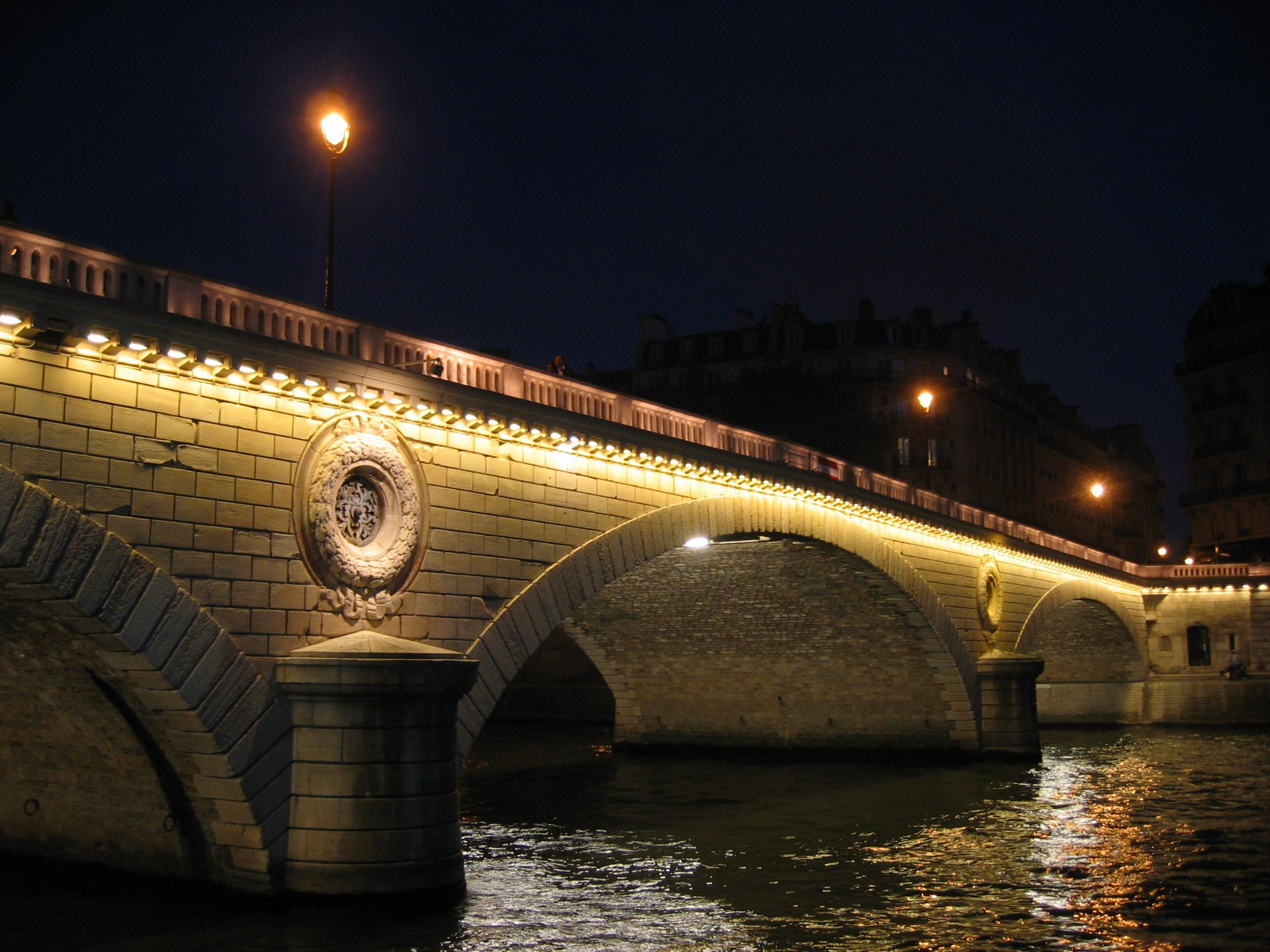
The bridge at night

== Metro station ==
Location on the Seine

The Pont Louis-Philippe is located near the Paris Metro station Pont Marie. It is served by line 7.

== Bibliography ==
- Felix and Louis Lazare, Dictionnaire historique des rues et monuments of Paris in 1855 with plans for 48 neighborhoods, Maisonneuve & Larose, 796 p. (ISBN 2-86877-184-X).
