= Pont Marie =

Bridge in Paris, France

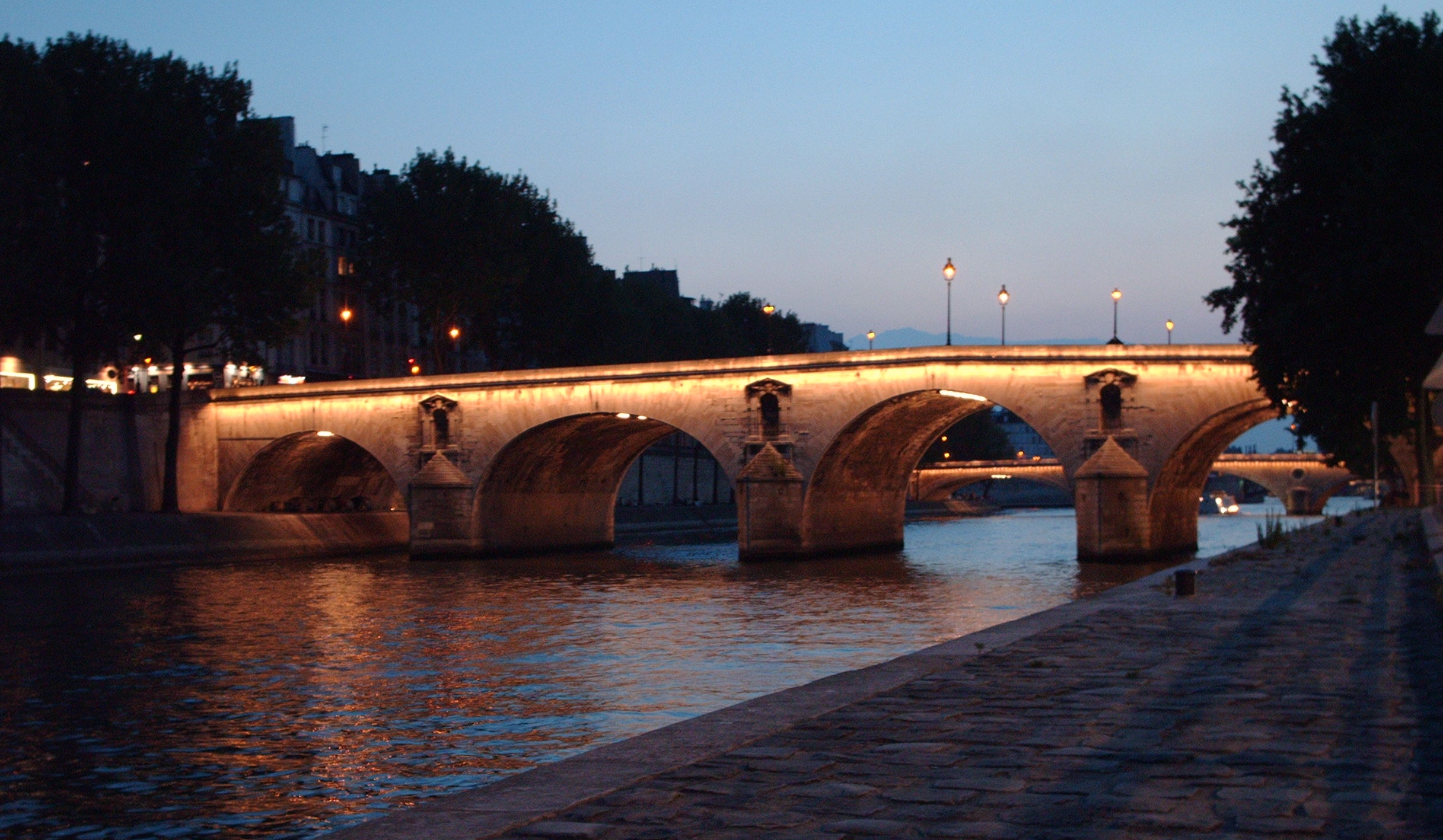
- Nighttime lighting of the Pont Marie.
- Coordinates: 48°51′10.10″N 02°21′26.80″E
- Carries: Motor vehicles, pedestrians, and bicycles
- Crosses: Seine
- Locale: Paris, France
- Official name: Pont Marie
- Next upstream: Pont Sully
- Next downstream: Pont Louis-Philippe

Characteristics
- Design: Arch Bridge
- Material: Stone
- Total length: 92 m (302 ft)
- Width: 22 m (72 ft)
- Clearance below: ?

History
- Designer: Rémy Collin, Jean Delgrange, Christophe Marie
- Construction start: 1614
- Construction end: 1635
- Opened: 1635

Statistics
- Toll: Free both ways

Location
- Interactive map of Pont Marie

The Pont Marie (French pronunciation: [pɔ̃ maʁi]) is a bridge which crosses the Seine in Paris, France.

The bridge links the Île Saint-Louis to the quai de l'Hôtel de Ville and is one of three bridges designed to allow traffic flow between the Île Saint-Louis and the Left and Right banks of Paris. The Pont Marie links the Right Bank and is the counterpart of the Pont de la Tournelle which is built along the same line but serves to connect the Île Saint-Louis with the Left Bank.

== History ==
The Pont Marie derives its name from the engineer Christophe Marie, who proposed its construction beginning in 1605 in order to augment and assist in the urbanisation of the île Saint-Louis. However the bridge was not actually approved for building by the king until 1614, at which point Louis XIII laid the first stone as part of a formal bridge building ceremony. Following approval, the Pont Marie's construction was spread out over 20 years, from 1614 to 1635. Thus, the bridge is one of the oldest bridges in Paris.

In 1635 the bridge was opened to circulation. Following its construction, there were proposals to build houses along the bridge's span. These proposals were countered by Christophe Marie, however approximately fifty were built regardless by carpenter Claude Dublet.

On 1 March 1658 a flood occurred, which caused the destruction of twenty houses that were built atop the structure and the deaths of about sixty people as well as the loss of two arches near to the île Saint-Louis side of the bridge. In 1660 a wooden bridge was rebuilt on the same spot, this time with a toll-booth which was designed to raise funds for the complete, stone renovation of the structure. This reconstruction was completed in 1670. In 1740, the remainder of the buildings atop the Pont Marie were removed and in 1769 all building atop the bridge was forbidden. In 1788, houses were barred from construction atop bridges throughout the city.

Since the 18th century, the structure has seen little change aside from the flattening of its rise which did not alter the appearance.

Each of the five arches of the Pont Marie is unique in that the niches in the abutments have never been filled with statues.

Some years ago, excursion boat companies operating in Paris began to claim that the Pont Marie is a "lovers' bridge" beneath which it is an "old tradition" to kiss the person next to oneself and make a wish (several variants on this theme exist). However, there is no historical basis for such a "tradition," even though it is now repeated without verification in an increasing number of tourist guides.

== Access ==
Location on the Seine

Located near the Métro station: Pont Marie.

== See also ==
- List of crossings of the River Seine
