= David Downie =

American novelist

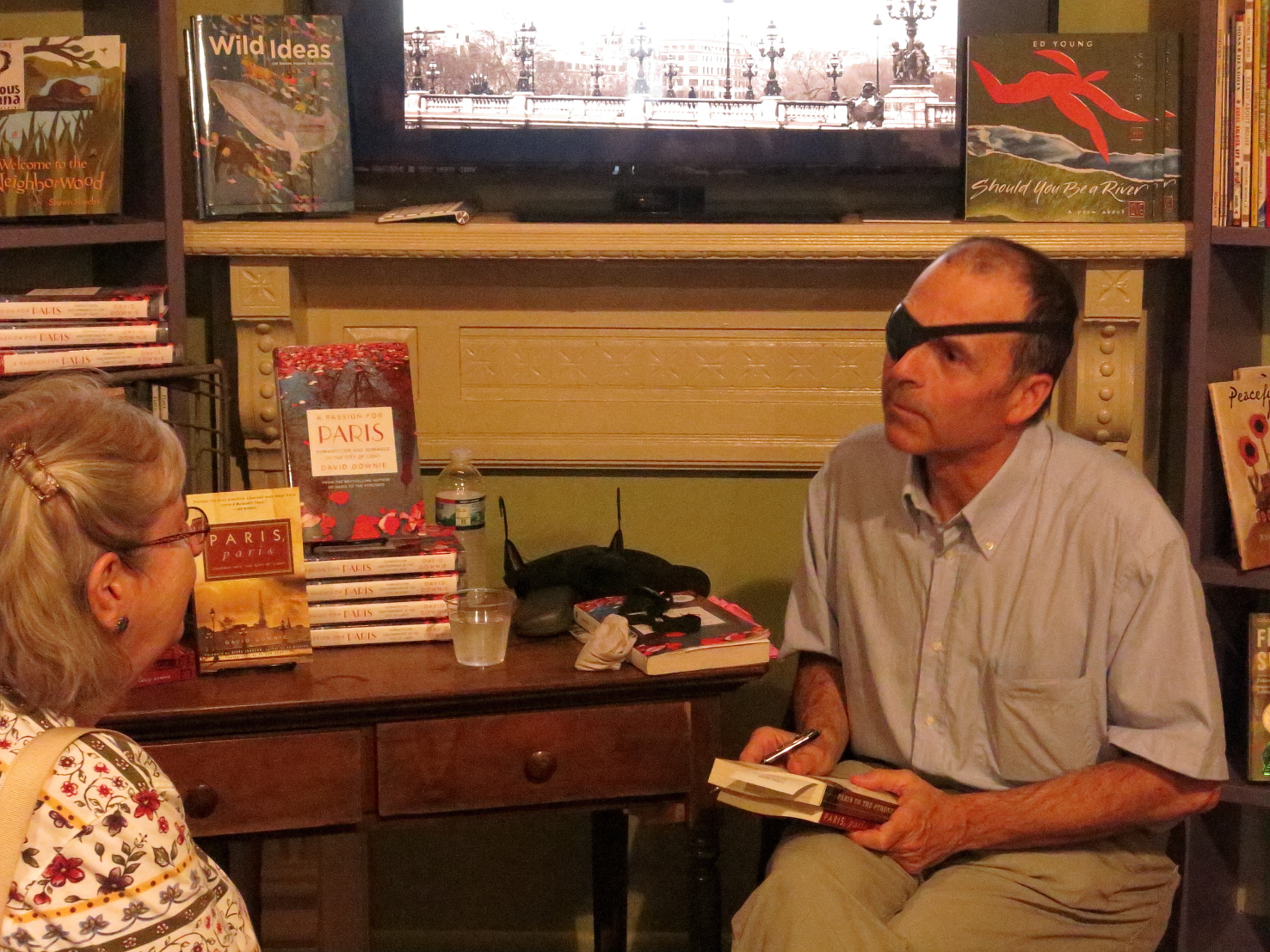
David Downie at Curious Iguana Bookstore, Frederick, Maryland

David D. Downie (born in San Francisco in 1958) is a multilingual Paris-based American nonfiction author, crime novelist and journalist who writes most often about culture, food and travel.

== Biography ==
Downie's family background is revealed in his memoir Shadows of Rome. His father, Charles E. Downie Jr., a Californian from Garden Grove, previously a journalist on the San Francisco Chronicle, served as a G.I. during the Second World War, fighting in the Italian campaign and reaching the Gothic Line. His Italian mother, Romana Anzi, an artist trained at the Fine Arts Academy in Rome and a runner for the Italian Resistance, thus became a G.I. bride. The couple lived for five years in Rome, where Charles wrote for the Rome edition of Stars and Stripes until it closed in 1945, then became a founder member of the editorial team at the Rome Daily American, unaware that it was funded by the C. I. A.: he was thus an unwitting participant in Operations Mockingbird and Gladio. Discovering some of this in 1950, he resigned, took his family to San Francisco and returned to the Chronicle. Romana renounced her Italian citizenship so as not to imperil her husband's job in the xenophobic McCarthy era. She lived as an eccentric, pantheist art teacher in San Francisco and the Bay Area. Thanks to her and to his "formidable" grandmother, who eventually migrated to California to be with her daughter but never learned English, David, youngest of six children, can claim Italian literally as both second language and mother tongue.

Downie was "weaned on crime novels and thrillers" and grew up reading Victor Hugo and Dante in old illustrated editions. His love for Rome, his mother's native city, arose from living there briefly in the mid-1960s: his mother, lonely and unhappy in San Francisco after his grandmother's death, took her children with her to Italy, where, preying successively on various relatives, they lived in Rome, on the shore of Lake Garda, at Verona and Padua until at last his father persuaded them all to return to the Bay Area.

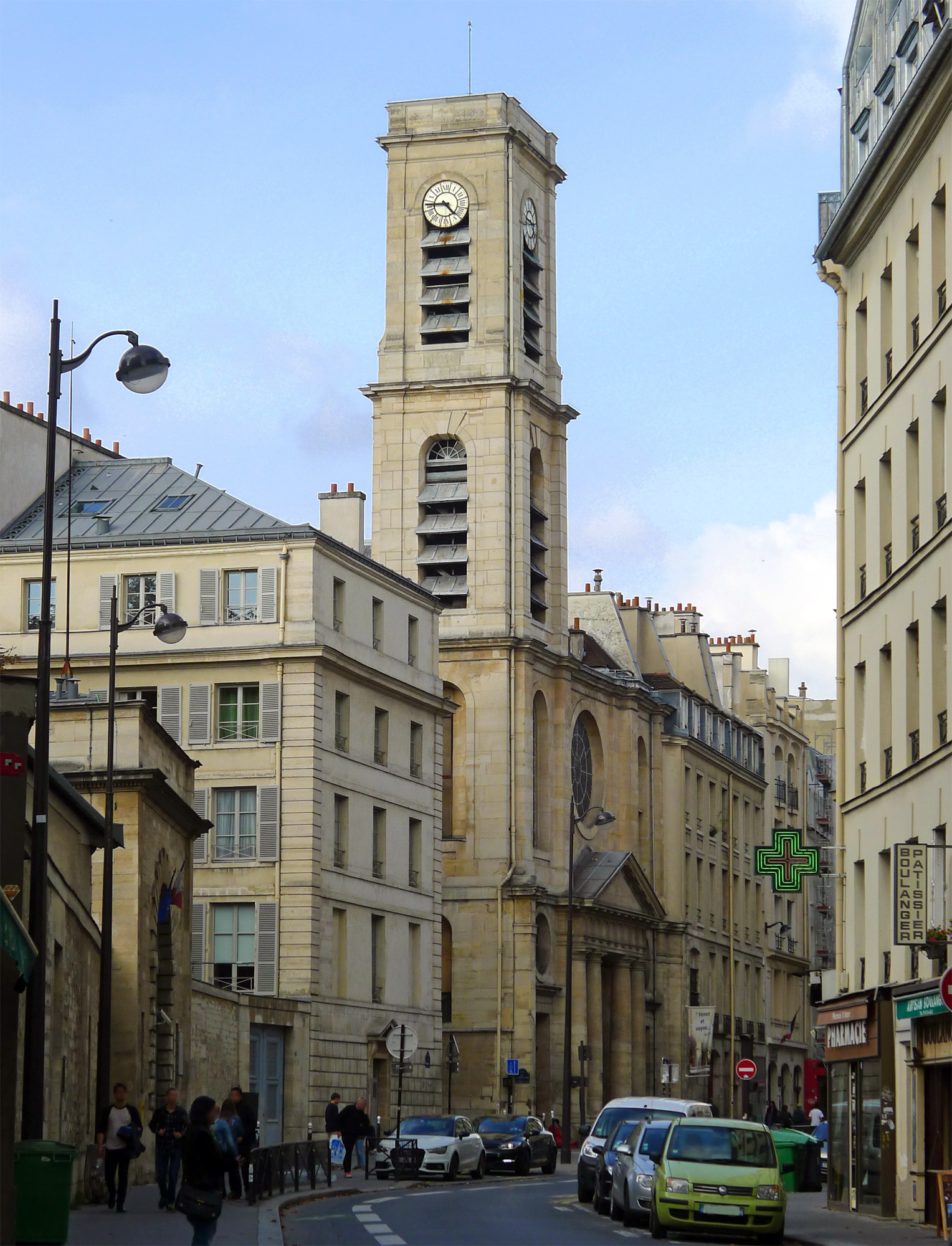
The church of Saint-Jacques-du-Haut-Pas on the Rue Saint-Jacques, where pilgrims setting out from Paris begin their walk to Compostela

In Berkeley in the late 1960s the reunited Downies "settled into a 1920s mock-Tudor house high upon the rolling hills, our family home for the next quarter century", where, quoting this time Downie's own understatement, "a lively time was had by all". His early and enduring enthusiasm for Paris springs from waiting tables at a Bay Area French restaurant, from volunteering as an usher at the San Francisco Opera where he saw Puccini's La Bohême, and from a first visit to the city in 1976.

A graduate of the University of California, Berkeley, Downie took a master's degree in Italian from Brown University in Providence, Rhode Island, where he was a Kenyon Scholar and University Fellow. He worked in the early 1980s as a translator, interpreter and press officer in Milan. Fiction that he wrote at this period received "very flattering rejection letters" from The New Yorker, but he was already beginning to publish nonfiction in magazines and newspapers. After what he calls a "roller-coaster marriage" to an Italian artist, he returned to Paris in 1986, and soon afterwards married the photographer Alison Harris. Now spending part of each year in Italy and part in France, for more than thirty years he has lived by his writing.

Together with Alison Harris he walked across much of central France following sections of the Way of Saint James, the greatest medieval European pilgrimage route. Appropriately for a "skeptic born and raised by skeptics ... a survivor both of the Haight-Ashbury and Berkeley’s Telegraph Avenue", this was more of an "anti-pilgrimage" from which he created a memoir, published in 2013. "After twenty years of living and working in France," he wrote, "I simply felt the need to make my own mental map of the country by walking across it step by measured step", beginning at Vézelay and passing through Bibracte and Cluny on ancient pathways. According to classicist and art historian Andrew Riggsby, in Paris to the Pyrenees Downie turned a story of self-discovery into an exploration of time and place. In this image of France "layers of the past are stacked and patched and run together: Caesar and his legions confronting Vercingétorix ... Roland and Charlemagne ... Viollet-le-Duc’s theme-park-ish restorations ... the Resistance to the Nazis, and even the travels of an earlier, more gluttonous, and less reflective David Downie". Anthony Sattin, another writer who combines travel with history, considers that in Downie's case the act of walking with the photographer Alison, the pleasures of the countryside, "the lighting out for the territory when one is a certain age", give this book its reason. The walk ("which he completed on foot between the titular locations", according to Gilbert Taylor's risky claim in Booklist) was in reality anything but complete when Downie, "an amiable companion, questioning and willing, and flawed", found that "a damaged back and aching knees force[d] him to stop just outside Mâcon", a long way from the Pyrenees and much further still from Compostela.

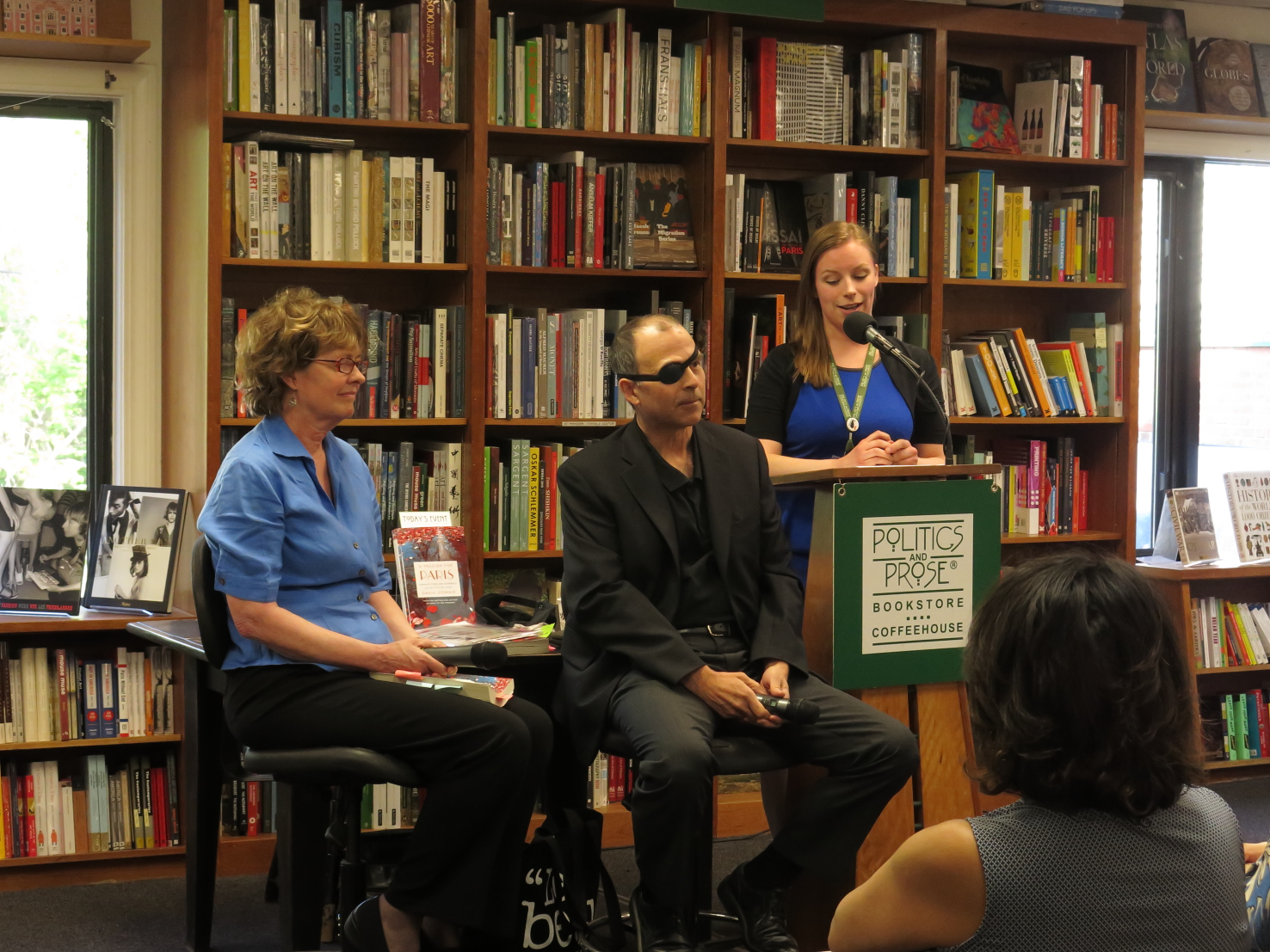
David Downie at Politics & Prose Bookstore, Washington, D. C.

His writing reflects an abiding interest in French and Italian culture and in the history and reality of food. For his first food book, Cooking the Roman Way, "when I had doubts about classic Roman recipes ... I asked my mother," he admitted. "She taught me the basics of cooking as soon as I grew tall enough to stir the pot of bubbling garofolato (beef stew)" for Tuesday dinner, whose leftovers would become pasta sauce for the Wednesday spaghetti feed. The uninhibited conviviality of Roman meals was what made the eating experience so pleasant, he advised the reader: this conviviality was "the hidden ingredient in all the recipes". "Perhaps Downie takes food a bit too seriously," Miranda Seymour reflected in praising A Taste of Paris in the New York Times Book Review. She quotes him as he savours a Parisian supper: "How delicious my appealingly plated but very old-fashioned roast pork loin with mustard sauce à l'ancienne. How polite and professional the service. How affordable the more than potable Château Haut-Musset Lalande-de-Pomerol." Downie scarcely disputes it. Earlier, preparing for the Way of Saint James, he had admitted to "a quarter century of high living as a travel and food writer", to "the recipes I'd tested, the buttery croissants and fluffy mousses I'd savored", to Calvados, cognac, and even "Inspector Maigret's Vieille Prune, a lethal eau de vie distilled from plums".

== Fiction ==
His first crime novel, La tour de l'immonde, about violence and murder in central Paris and its banlieue, was published in French in 1997 in the fiction collection Le Poulpe. Aiming to sell the English-language version he took the text to New York. An editor at Vintage Books, finding it "too French", was sufficiently intrigued to ask for something new: this in turn was rejected as "too French ... very strange, nice writing, but not for us". The new work, after further rewriting, became Downie's second novel, Paris: City of Night, a thriller involving a putative terrorist plot to destroy parts of Paris. It appeared in 2009. The story came to him, he has explained, "because I woke up one morning blind in one eye. I have posterior ischemic optic neuritis. The color drained from my right eye as the optic nerve died ... Understanding light and the functioning of the eye ... became an obsession". Hence Paris: City of Night began as a murder mystery about a historical character from the world of photography.

A third novel, The Gardener of Eden, was published by Pegasus Books in 2019. It is set in his native California, under a "new crypto-fascist government", in a small town that is now an economic desert, its salmon fishery and lumber industries were sacrificed to clearcutting and environmental plunder". This story of literary suspense is built on "deeply disturbing observations of contemporary American culture".

Downie's fascination with left/right politics is an undercurrent in his series of "Daria Vinci Investigations". In the first, Red Riviera (published 2021), Commissioner Vinci of the Italian crime investigation service DIGOS unravels the gruesome murder of a 92-year-old Italian-American former CIA operative. The heroine, a karate expert and "plagued by the constant need to question received wisdom" like the author, is supported by two contrasting characters, her sidekick Osvaldo Morbido and her 92-year-old godfather Willem Bremach, but she is almost defeated by the Neo-Fascist local questor (chief of police). Vinci "prove[s] she would risk anything to solve a case, even masquerading as a corpse in a refrigerated morgue drawer, or jumping from a hovering helicopter piloted by a treacherous former lover in the middle of a lightning storm". Genoa and the surrounding Cinque Terre are compellingly evoked, and Downie claims to have predicted, in an episode involving seabed exploration, the location of a Roman shipwreck that would actually be discovered a year later in the Gulf of Portofino.

The second Daria Vinci novel, Roman Roulette, appeared in 2022. Daria, now at work in Rome, investigates the apparently self-inflicted death in the Catacombs, directly beneath the headquarters of the American Institute in Rome, of a freelance author hired to write the institute's history. The death had taken place at a moment when, not far above, Daria was attending a benefit concert for the institute. Conveniently Bremach and Morbido are at hand again; in Rome, once again, there is a questor who wants her off the case.

Right-wing politics in the United States becomes an insistent theme in Downie's Clear, Cool, Sweet Water (2026), though the novel is set entirely in Europe. The disappearance of Robert, an ageing U.S. expatriate, long settled in eastern France, appears at first to result from ambitious hiking in a forested, swampy landscape. Instead he has travelled incognito to Italy, attempting to re-attract his estranged wife, Laure, while dodging his murderous nephew, the ferrety-faced hacker Luke, who is armed with a drone as well as firearms (a reviewer sees "dark shadows of Ukraine and Iran"). The enmity results from Robert's quarrel with his brother, Luke's father, who now leads an evangelical church in California with extreme conservative leanings. Laure, Robert and Luke are followed in alternate chapters towards a climax in Monterosso al Mare in Liguria: Robert and Laure are reunited at the spot where they first fell in love, while Luke is trapped by Italian bureaucracy, the only force able to stand against the powers that threaten the world. The book's title is the opening line of a famous sonnet by Petrarch: "Chiare, fresche e dolci acque".

== Nonfiction ==
Commenting on Downie's nonfiction Michael Ondaatje has called him "the master of educated curiosity". His first non-fiction book in English, Enchanted Liguria appeared in 1997. It was translated the following year in Italy under the title La Liguria incantata. His book Paris, Paris (first edition 2005) explores the sites of Paris, from the Ile Saint-Louis to Les Halles and the parks of Montsouris and Buttes Chaumont. Paris, Paris includes insights on Georges Pompidou, François Mitterrand and Coco Chanel. The book was reissued in April 2011 as part of the Armchair Traveler series at Broadway Books (Random House), now including a new chapter (titled "Hit the Road Jacques") on the Way of Saint James in Paris. Meanwhile, he had been invited to translate Jean-Christophe Napias's Quiet Corners of Paris (The Little Bookroom, 2007), which in turn led him to write Quiet Corners of Rome for the same publisher: this appeared in 2011.

His work is full of historical insights, although, as Margaret Quamme carefully warned librarians when recommending A Taste of Paris (2017), he "may not be temperamentally suited for writing a strictly chronological history". When researching A Passion for Paris: Romanticism and Romance in the City of Light (2015) he was walking in the footsteps of Baudelaire, Flaubert, Balzac, Hemingway and Gertrude Stein. In this exploration of Paris in the 19th century heyday of Romanticism, less-known figures aroused his special enthusiasm: Félix Nadar, pioneer photographer and impractical dreamer, and Henri Murger, sickly author of Scènes de la vie de Bohème which was transformed into Puccini's La Bohême. Downie's knowledge of the city and its artists seemed to grant him a mystical gift of access: doors left ajar and carriage gates left open. He recalled that Le Marais was once both royal and bohemian, and dominated by Victor Hugo; that the Montmartre of the Romantics was a grassy hill, with goat herds and real windmills, and its artists’ studios were vast, light and cheap.

His illustrated book on the contemporary cuisine of Rome, Cooking the Roman Way, was listed among the top ten cookbooks of 2002 by the Chicago Tribune, The Boston Globe and San Francisco Chronicle. The book is full of anecdotes about the names, hidden meanings and origins of Italian foods; useful notes explain the difference between farro and spelt and the nature and use of the quinto quarto ("fifth quarter") of butchered animals. Among his food- and wine-related books are three volumes in the Terroir Guides series, published by The Little Bookroom, and dedicated to the food and wine of the Italian Riviera (and Genoa), Rome and Burgundy.

"The fall is the best time to eat in France," Downie reported in autumn 2017 as A Taste of Paris was published, "everyone knows that. It's when everything comes in. It's the harvest season." As he recognised, French food awareness has an elitist side: "The reason Paris has great food in modern times is because of money ... All the best stuff gets rushed to Paris because this is the best market. There are rich families and demanding eaters here." A Taste of Paris begins with the food of Roman Paris, continues through the Middle Ages and Renaissance, "enlarges on the gourmand seventeenth and eighteenth centuries" to reach the present day, but "each historical episode is at the same time an exploration of some Parisian neighbourhood" from its origins to its modern food landmarks.

== Journalism and autobiography ==
Downie's articles have appeared in about 50 publications, print and online, including the Los Angeles Times, San Francisco Chronicle, Bon Appétit, Gourmet, Gastronomica, The Art of Eating, Australian Financial Review, Salon.com, Epicurious.com and Concierge.com. He has acted as Paris correspondent, contributing editor or European editor for a number of publications, including Appellation, Art & Antiques and Departures. His writing has also appeared in anthologies, among them The Collected Traveler volumes on Paris, Southwest France and Central Italy.

His memoir Shadows of Rome (Seine, Tiber & Bay, 2025) relies on his own memory and on that of his parents and grandparents, admittedly not always reliable. He has spent time "investigating the story of my mother's eccentric parents and brothers ... and many other quirky members of the Downie and Anzi tribes". Major figures are his father, "a dispassionate American", his mother, "an extroverted Roman teen", her father Alessandro Anzi who "deserves a book on his own", and, not least, the "gallery of friends and family she collected in California".

== Works ==
Books

- 1995 : Un'altra Parigi, nove passeggiate insolite nella Ville Lumière (with Ulderico Munzi)
- 1995 : The Irreverent Guide to Amsterdam
- 1997 : Enchanted Liguria: A Celebration of the Culture, Lifestyle and Food of the Italian Riviera (Rizzoli International)
  - Italian translation, 1998: La Liguria incantata: Cultura, stile di vita, cucina della Riviera ligure. Translated by Camilla Orlando (SAGEP, Genoa. ISBN 978-88-7058-699-2)
- 1997 : La tour de l'immonde (La Baleine)
- 2002 : Cooking the Roman Way: Authentic recipes from the home cooks and trattorias of Rome (HarperCollins). Photography by Alison Harris
- 2005 : Paris, Paris: Journey into the City of Light (Transatlantic Press; new edition, 2011, Broadway Books)
- 2008 : Food Wine The Italian Riviera & Genoa (The Little Bookroom)
- 2009 : Food Wine Rome (The Little Bookroom)
- 2009 : Paris, City of Night (MEP, Inc)
- 2010 : Food Wine Burgundy (The Little Bookroom)
- 2011 : Quiet Corners of Rome (The Little Bookroom)
- 2013 : Paris to the Pyrenees: A Skeptic Pilgrim Walks the way of Saint James (Pegasus Books)
- 2015 : A Passion for Paris: Romanticism and Romance in the City of Light (St. Martin's Press)
- 2017 : A Taste of Paris: A History of the Parisian Love Affair with Food (St. Martin's Press)
- 2019 : The Gardener of Eden (Pegasus Books)
- 2021 : Red Riviera: a Daria Vinci investigation (Alan Squire Publishing)
- 2022 : Roman Roulette: a Daria Vinci investigation (Alan Squire Publishing)
- 2022 : Four of Clubs: Murder in the High Sierra (Seine, Tiber & Bay)
- 2023 : The Paris, Paris Timeline (Seine, Tiber & Bay)
- 2025 : Shadows of Rome: a memoir (Seine, Tiber & Bay)
- 2026 : Clear, Cool, Sweet Water (Seine, Tiber & Bay)

As translator

- 2007 : Jean-Christophe Napias, Quiet Corners of Paris (The Little Bookroom)

Selected articles

- 1999 : "Renzo Piano, Agent Provocateur" in San Francisco Chronicle: SFGate (16 May)
- 2003 : "A Roman Anchovy's Tale" in Gastronomica vol. 3 pp. 25–28 JSTOR
- 2003 : "Buried Treasure" in Los Angeles Times (8 June)
- 2010 : "Letter from Rome: The view from the Janus Hill, or how some Romans think of Rome" at Gadling (4 August)
- 2011 : "Chartres Keeps Its Spiritual Allure" in San Francisco Chronicle: SFGate (10 July)
- 2011 : "Walking on the Wild Side of Paris" at Gadling (22 November)
- 2012 : "In the Shadow of Cinque Terre: discovering the treasures of La Spezia" at Gadling (28 December)
- 2013 : "David's Discoveries: The beetle-loving calligrapher of Paris" at Gadling (30 June)
