= Pont de Sully =

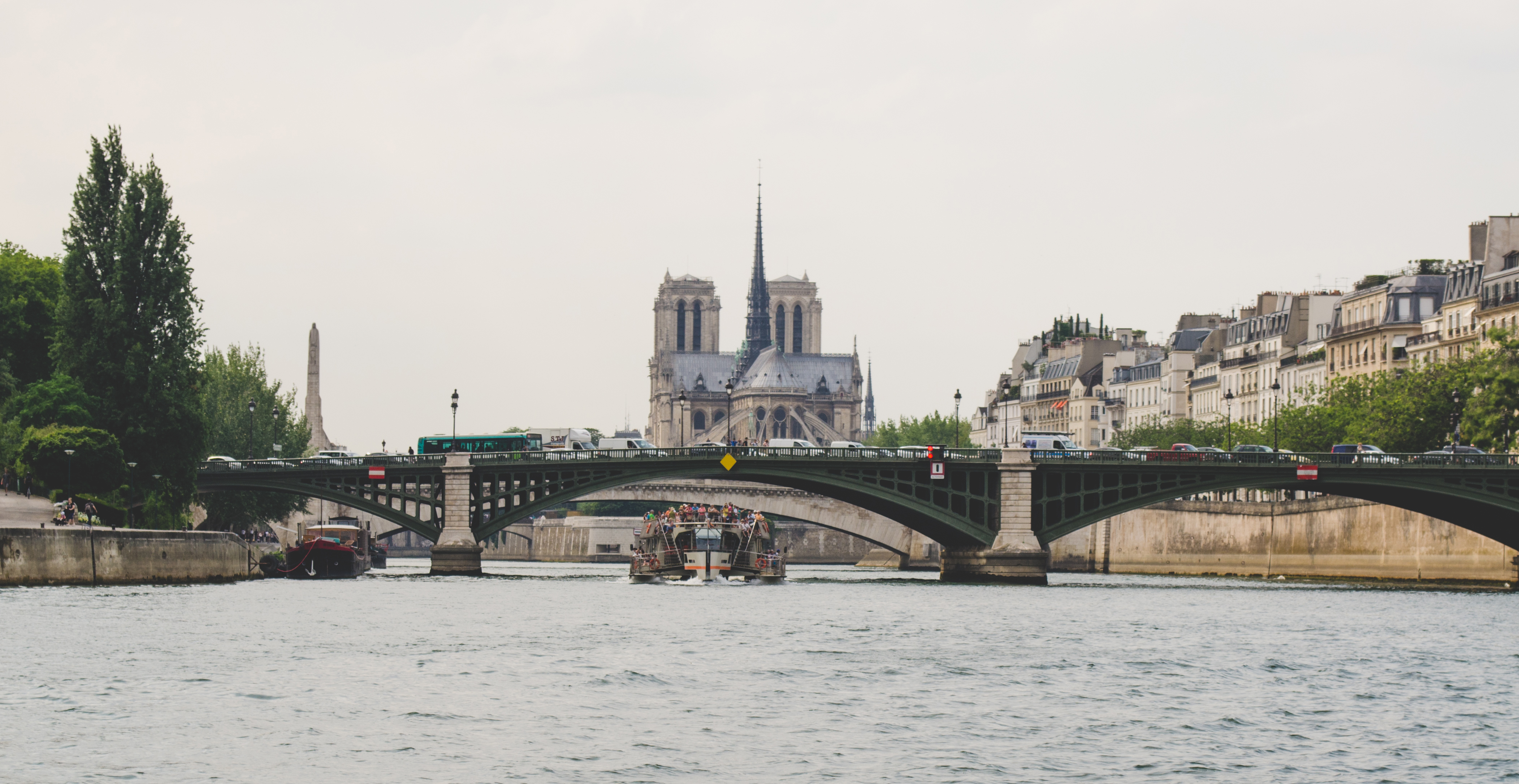
- Southern part of the Pont de Sully from the east with the Cathedral of Notre Dame in the background
- Coordinates: 48°51′00″N 2°21′33″E
- Crosses: Seine
- Locale: Paris, France
- Next upstream: Pont d'Austerlitz
- Next downstream: Pont de la Tournelle; Pont Marie

The Pont de Sully (or Pont Sully; French pronunciation: [pɔ̃ də syli]) is a bridge across the Seine in Paris, France.

In reality two separate bridges, carrying the Boulevard Henri IV, meet on the eastern tip of the Île Saint-Louis in the 4th arrondissement of Paris. The northern part links the island to the rest of the 4th arrondissement on the Right Bank, while the southern part links the island to the Boulevard Saint-Germain in the 5th arrondissement of Paris on the Left Bank. The nearest Metro station is Sully – Morland, located on the Right Bank.

== History ==
Location on the Seine

The current bridge replaced two pedestrian suspension bridges, which had been lost. One, the Passerelle Damiette, linked the island to the Right Bank, and the other, the Passerelle de Constantine, linked the island to the Left Bank. The construction of the pedestrian bridges was authorized by an act of 18 June 1836, in favor of M. de Beaumont, the projector, who would recoup his expenses, valued at 380.000 fr., by collecting tolls. They were constructed by the engineer Surville and opened in January 1838. The Passerelle Damiette was destroyed in the 1848 Revolution, while the Passerelle de Constantine collapsed in 1872 owing to corrosion in its cables.

The current bridge was constructed in 1876, as part of Haussmann's renovation of Paris; it opened on 25 August 1877. It is named in honour of Maximilien de Béthune, duke of Sully (1560–1641) and minister to Henry IV. It was designed by the engineers Paul Vaudrey and Gustave Brosselin. They set it at an angle of about 45 degrees to the river banks, which means that it gives a splendid view over the quais of the Île Saint-Louis and Notre-Dame. The southern part consists of three cast iron arches, while the northern part, over the narrower arm of the river, consists of a central 42-metre arch in cast iron and two 15-metre arches in masonry.

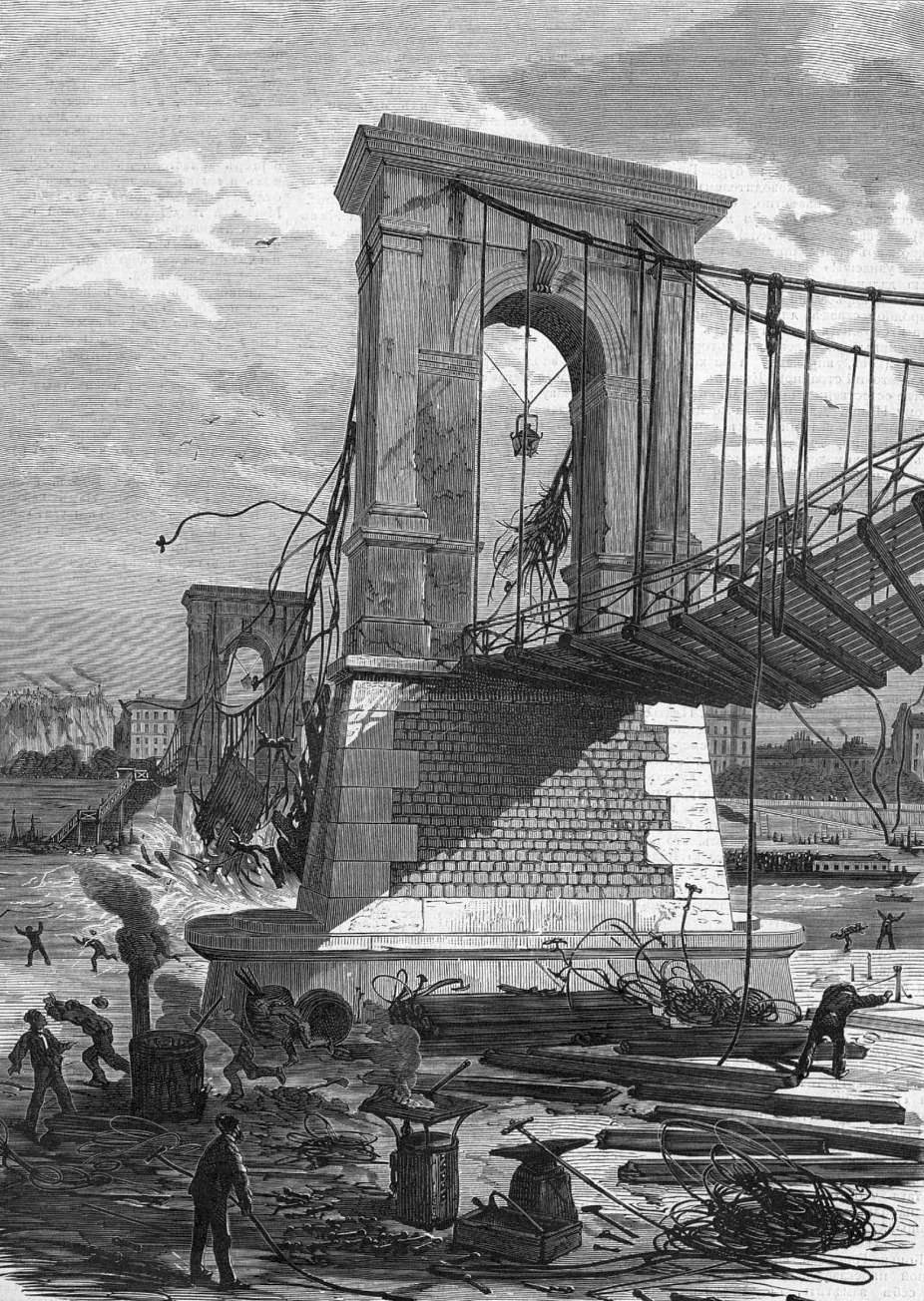
The collapse of the pedestrian bridge, 1872

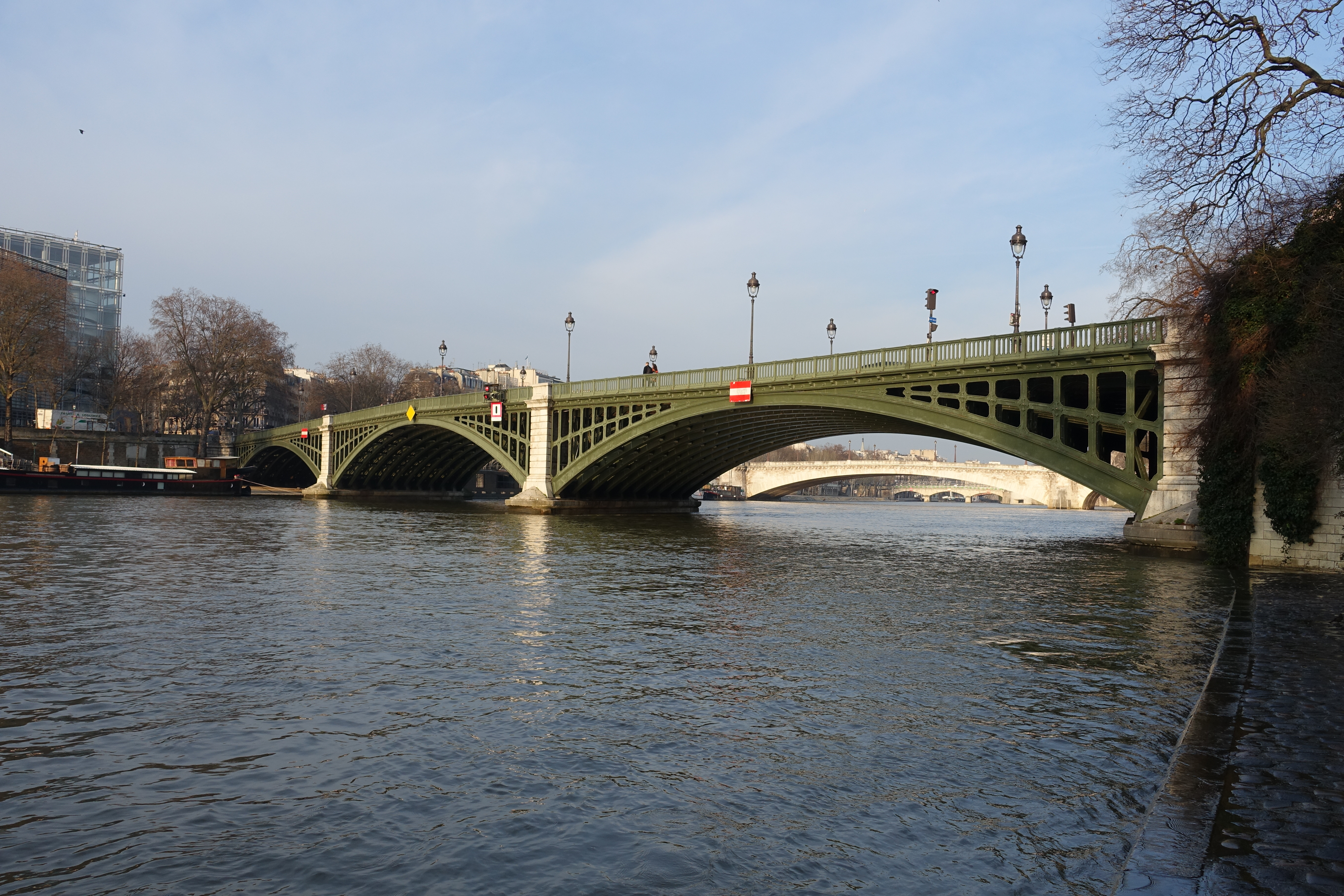
The southern part from the west

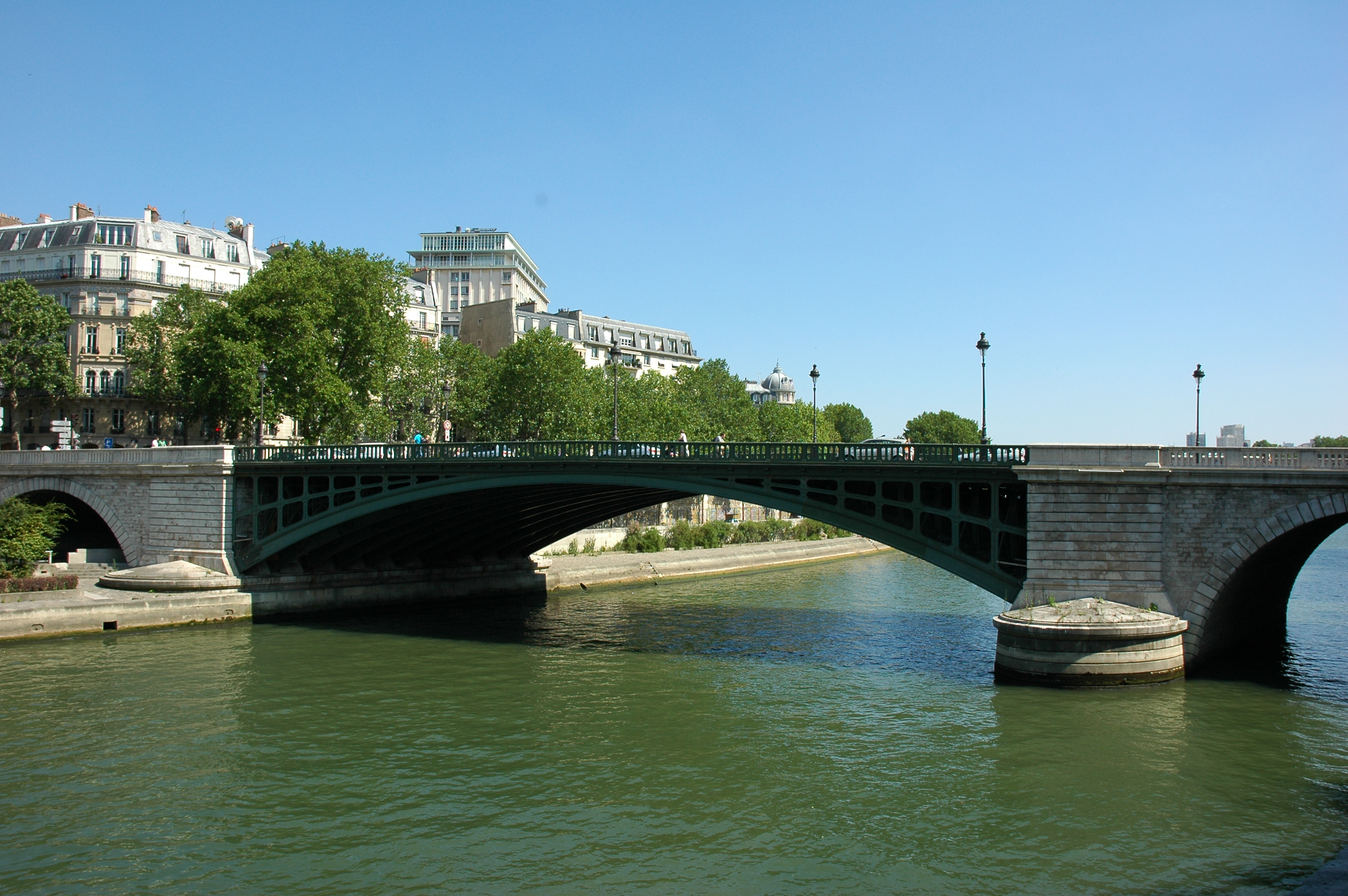
The northern part from the west

== See also ==
- List of crossings of the River Seine
