= Île Saint-Louis =

Island in the river Seine, Paris, France

Coordinates: 48°51′06″N 2°21′23″E

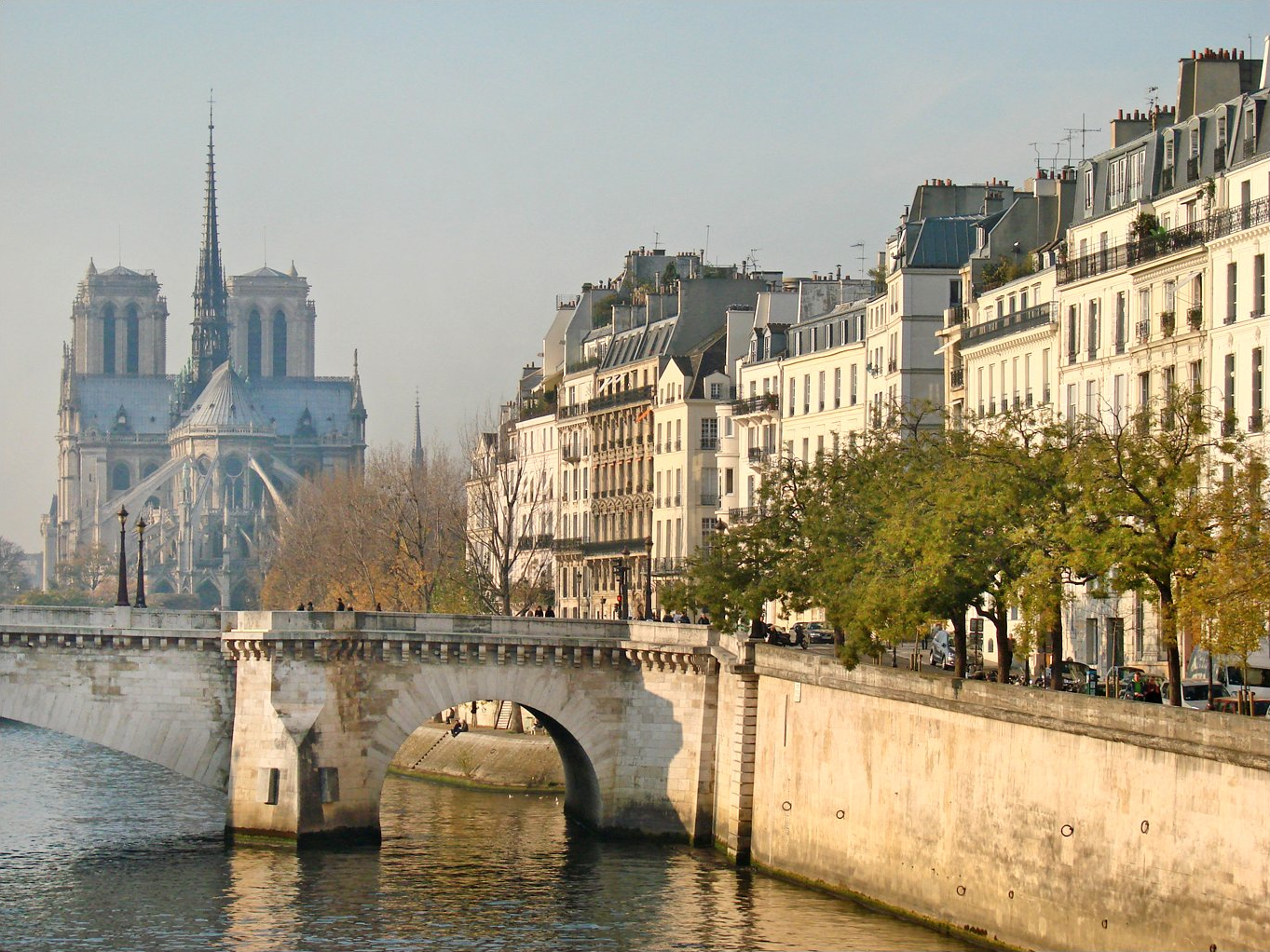

- Location within Paris

Île Saint-Louis (French: [il sɛ̃ lwi]), eleven hectares (27 acres) in size, is one of two natural islands in the Seine river, in Paris, France (the other natural island is the Île de la Cité, where Notre-Dame de Paris is located). Île Saint-Louis is connected to the rest of Paris by four bridges to both banks of the river and to the Île de la Cité by the Pont Saint-Louis.

The island is located within the 4th arrondissement of Paris and has a population of 4,453.

== History ==
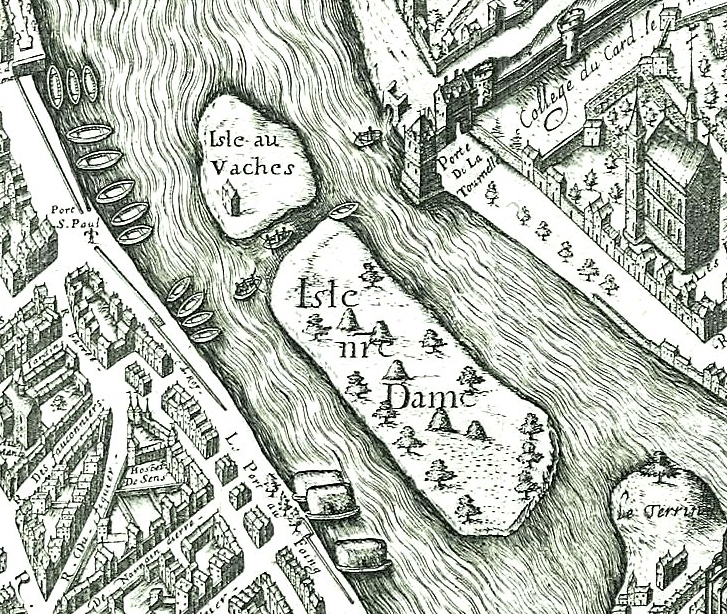
Île aux Vaches and Île Notre-Dame in Vassalieu Plan (1609)

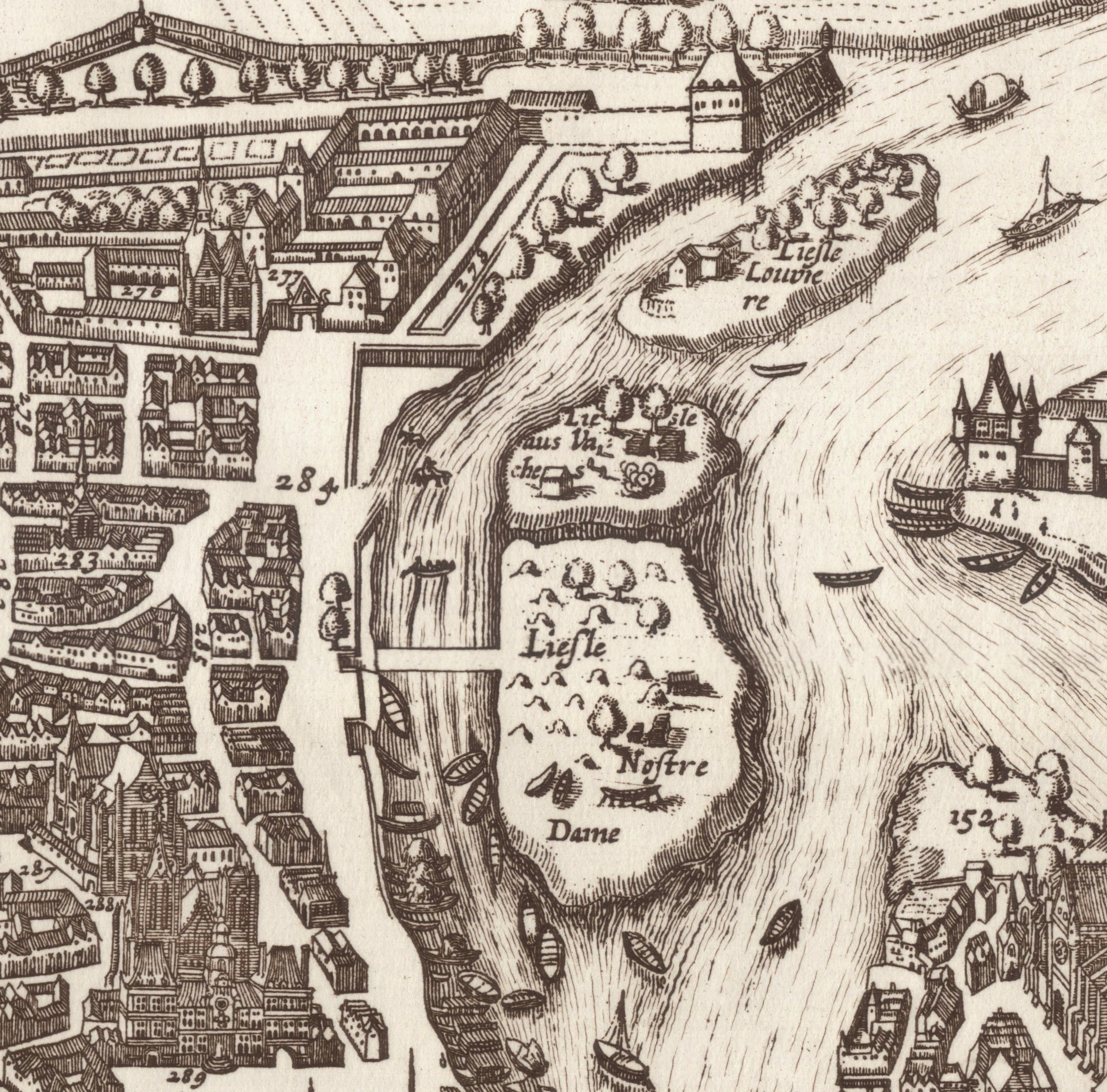
The islands Île aux Vaches and Île Notre-Dame in 1618

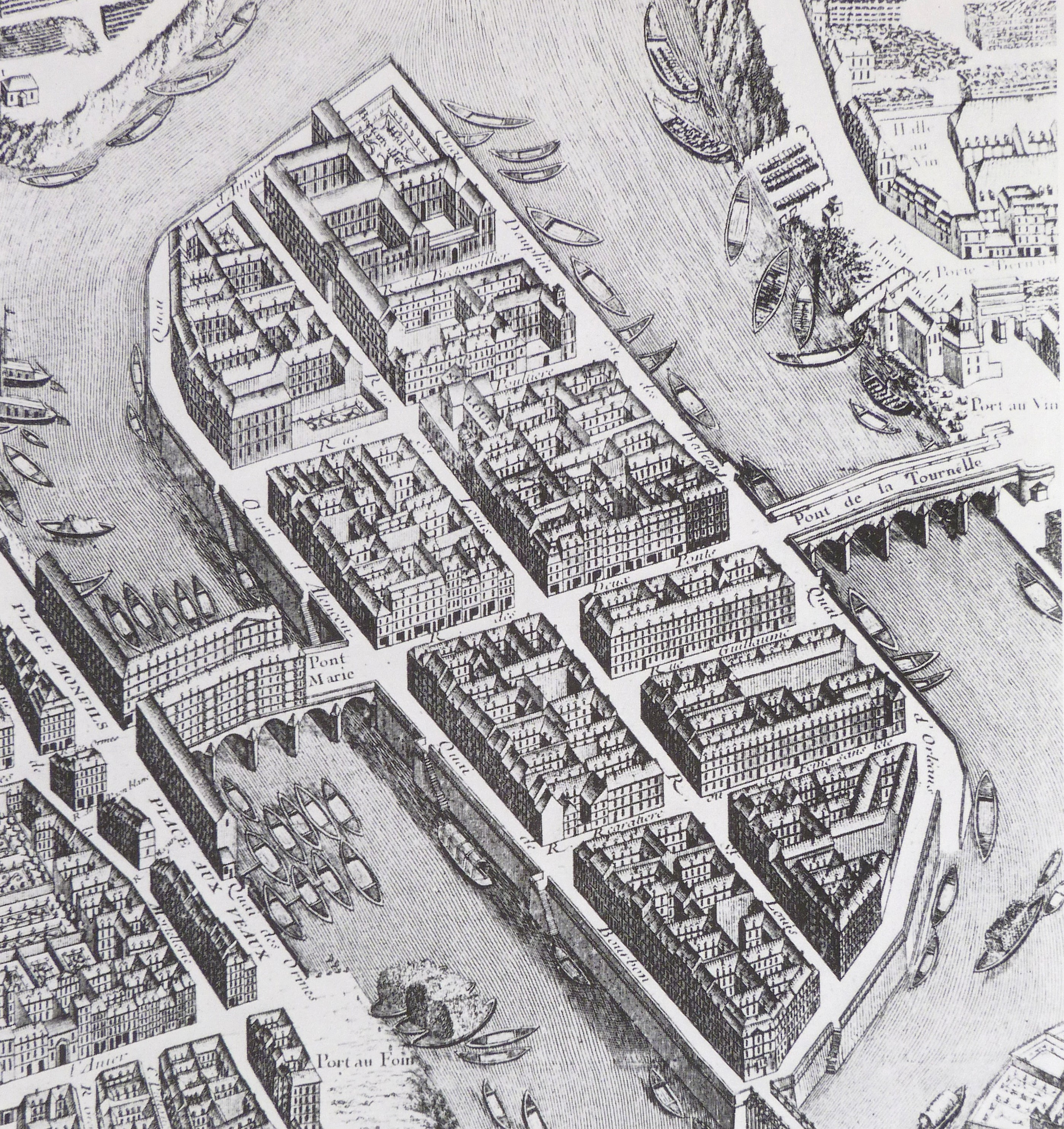
Île Saint-Louis in Turgot Map (1739)

The island was first known as the Île Notre-Dame, and was used mostly for grazing cattle, fishing, drying laundry, and occasionally for fighting duels. In 1360 it was cut in half by a canal, at about the current Rue Poulettiere, in order to bring it into the protection of the new wall around the city built by King Charles V, The slightly smaller eastern portion was named the Ile des Vaches (Island of Cows) (not to be confused with another island of the same name farther downstream). That portion was used for storing wood and building boats.

It was originally owned by the chapter of Notre-Dame cathedral. The island was destined for real estate development under King Henry IV, but the king's assassination in 1610 delayed the project. It was revived 1616 by the developers Christophe Marie, Poulettiere Le Regrettier. The canal dividing the island was filled, plots laid out and imposing residences built. The urbanisation of the island was rapid; within fifty years it was entirely occupied. The Pont Marie, which connects the island with the right bank, is named for Christophe Marie, one of the real estate developers of the island. Beginning in 1614, he was chief builder for Marie de' Medici, the widow of Henry IV and regent of the young King, Louis XIII. She instructed him to fill in the canal which divided the two parts of the island, and to build solid stone banks entirely around the island. The first part of the project was a new bridge, the Pont Louis XIII; the first stone was laid by the young king himself, then age 13. Various problems delayed the work on the bridge, which was not finished until 1635. The bridge has five arches, each of different sizes. Niches were built for statues between the arches, but, due to the difficulties of the regime, no statues were ever put in place.

Marie de' Medici promised a long series of benefits, including tennis courts and laundry boats for washing clothing and linen, to those who purchased lots and built houses on the island. She succeeded in attracting magistrates and financiers, but few aristocrats, who preferred the Marais quarter, which had larger plots of land and places for gardens. She also met resistance from the Chapter of Notre Dame, which owned considerable property on the island. Their resistance eventually drove the developer Christophe Marie into bankruptcy. In the end, the houses of the wealthy occupied waterside properties, while the interior was occupied by merchants and artisans.

The island did not take the name of Saint-Louis until 1725. Louis IX, who was made a saint only thirty years after his death in 1270, was believed to have sometimes held court and rendered justice on the island.

During the French Revolution, the island was briefly renamed "Ile de la Fraternité".

== Plan ==
Map of Île Saint-Louis

== Description ==
=== Quai d'Anjou ===
The Quai d'Anjou on the north side of the island, was named for Gaston, Duke of Orléans, the brother of Louis XIII. It was developed by Christophe Marie beginning in 1614. One prominent building is the house of Louis Le Vau, chief architect of the King (3 quai d'Anjou). Another prominent resident of the Quai was Abel-Francois Poisson (5 quai D'Anjou) the Marquis of Marigny and brother of Madame de Pompadour, superintendent of royal buildings for Louis XV. Later residents of the quai included the painter Honoré Daumier, (9 quai d'Anjou) who had a lithography workshop on the top floor. The poet Charles Baudelaire occupied a small apartment on the top floor in the courtyard at 17 Quai d'Anjou from 1843 to 1846.

=== Quai de Bourbon ===
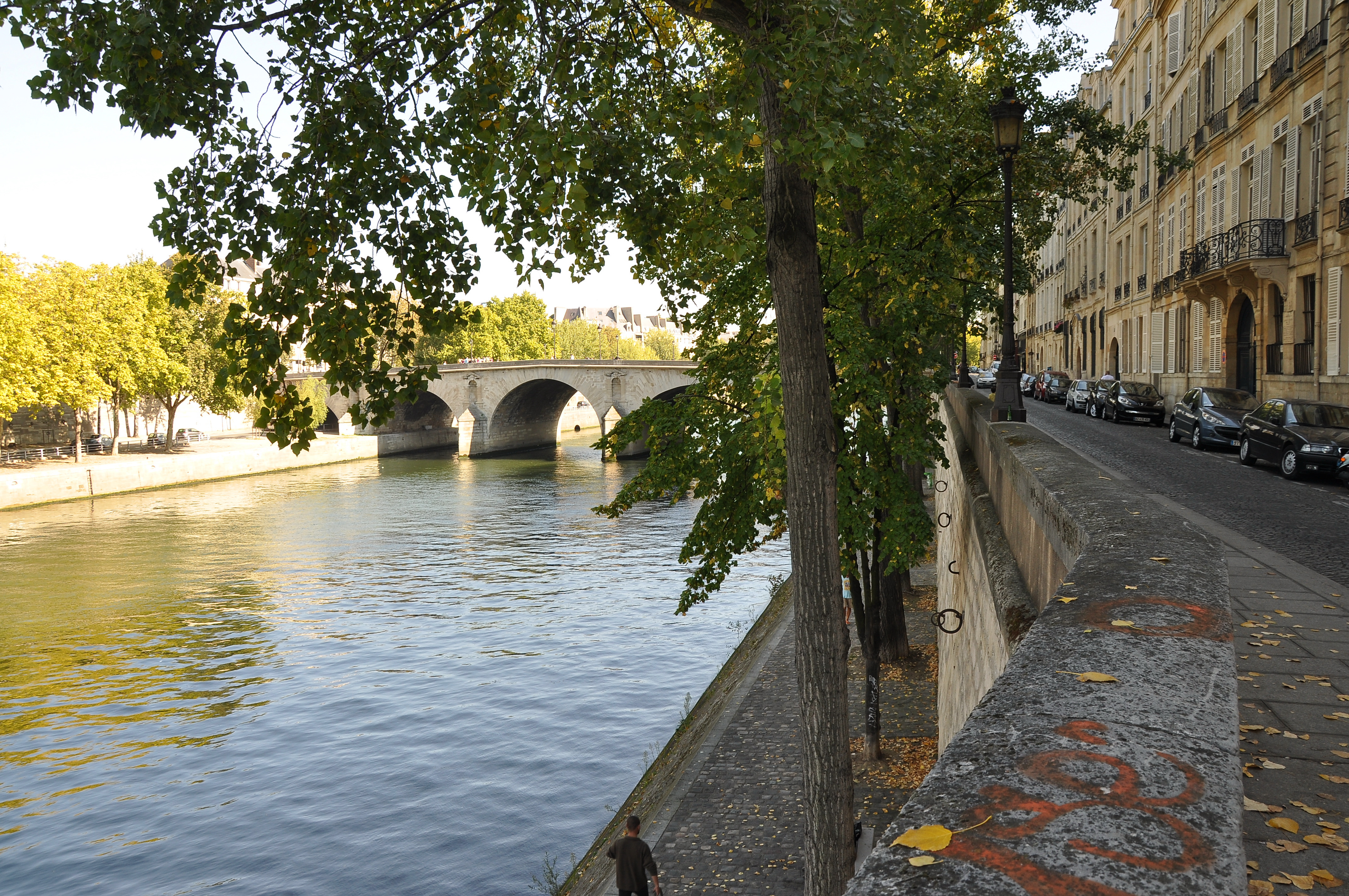
Bank of the Quai de Bourbon and Pont Marie

The Quai de Bourbon was named for the royal family and has a series of very elegant townhouses constructed in the early 17th century. It was briefly the Quai de la Republique after the Revolution, but took back its original name in 1814. The house at 1 quai de Bourbon was occupied by Philippe de Champagne, a favorite artist of Cardinal Richelieu. The sculptor Camille Claudel lived at number 19 between 1899 and 1923, and had her workshop overlooking the courtyard, and remained here until she was sent to an insane asylum for thirty years.

The Pont Saint-Louis is the only bridge connecting the two islands, and is 60 metres (200 ft) long. The first bridge, of wood, was built in 1634. The current bridge, the ninth, was opened in 1970.

=== Quai de Bethune ===
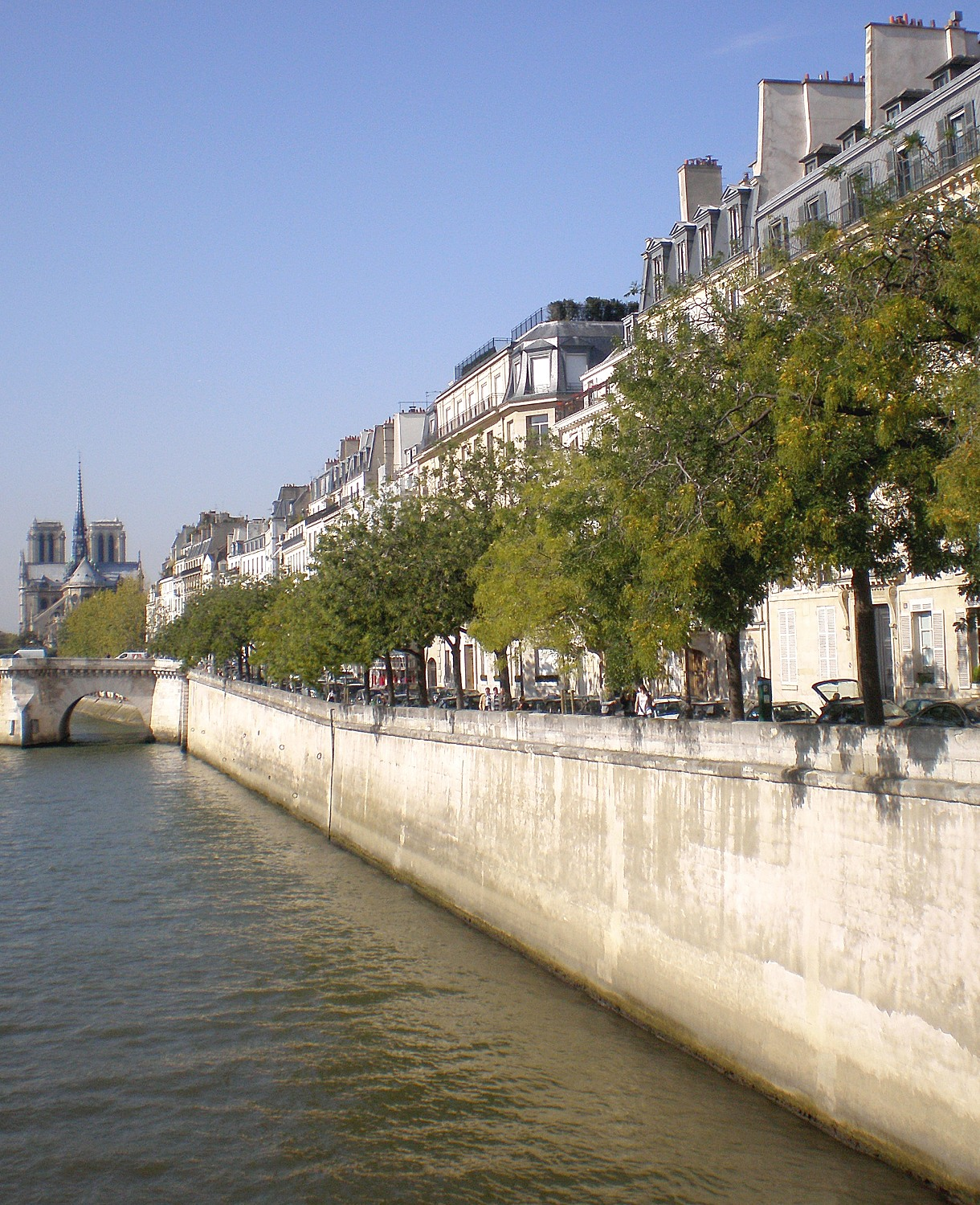
Quai de Bethune

The Quai de Bethune runs along the southeast side of the island. It was built shortly after the assassination of Henry IV, and is named for the late king's prime minister, Maximilien de Bethune, the Duke of Sully. The Pont de Sully bridge at the southeast end of the island also carries his name.

The quai was originally informally called the "Quai des Balcons" because the architect, Louis LeVau, promoted the idea that all of the buildings should have balconies, taking advantage of the southern exposure of the buildings. Residents of this quai over the years included the American cosmetics manufacturer Helena Rubenstein (24 quai de Bethune), who constructed the very few modern buildings on the island at 24 Quai de Bethune between 1934 and 1938. The carved masks of lions on the wooden door is the only vestige of the 17th-century house. French president Georges Pompidou had his personal residence at 24 Quai de Bethune, in addition to his official residence. The French comedian Louis de Funès lived for a short time at the same address. Other celebrated residents of the quai included the Nobel Prize-winning physicist Marie Curie, who lived at number 36 from 1912 until her death in 1934.

=== Quai d'Orleans ===
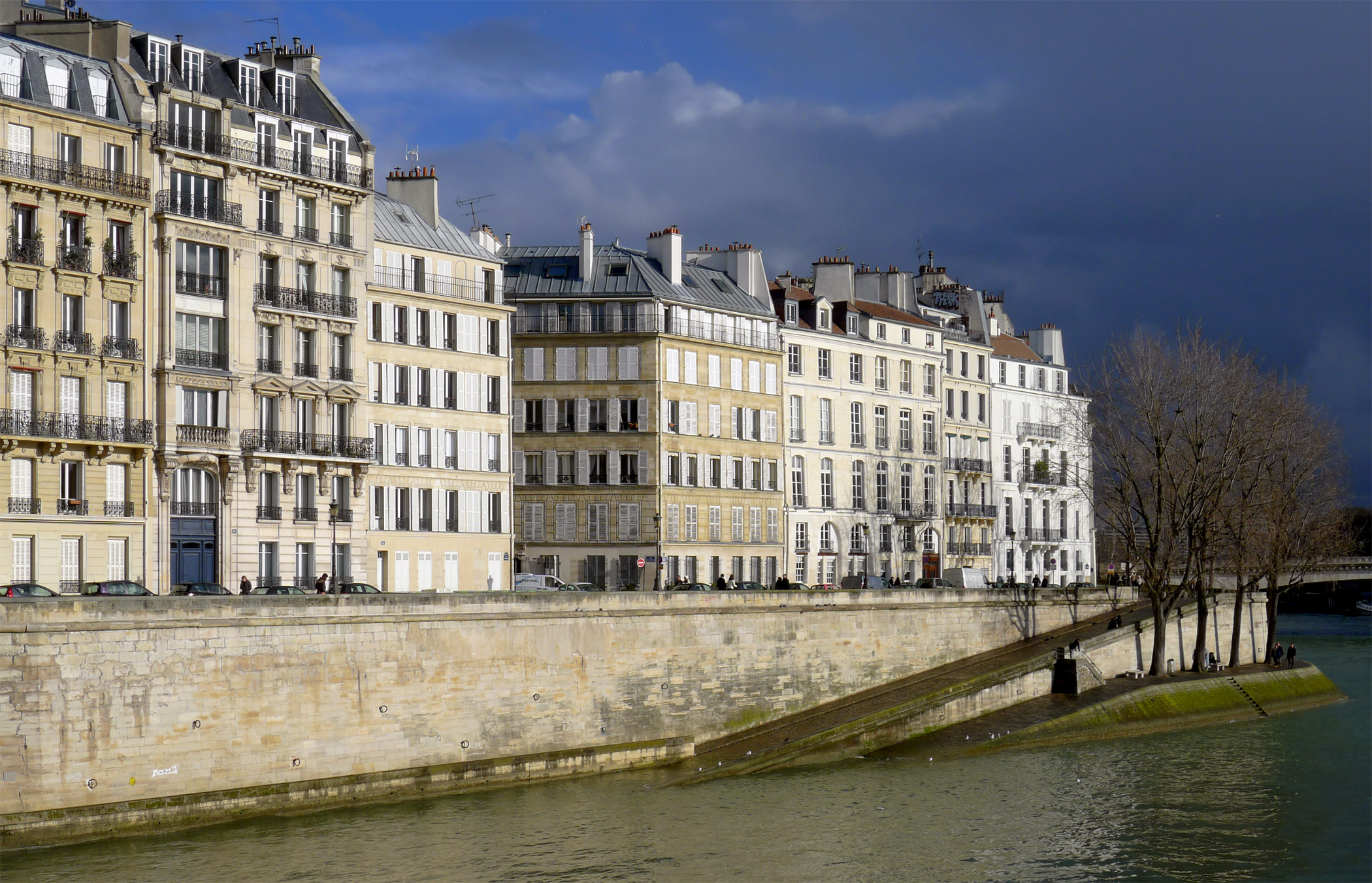
Quai d'Orleans

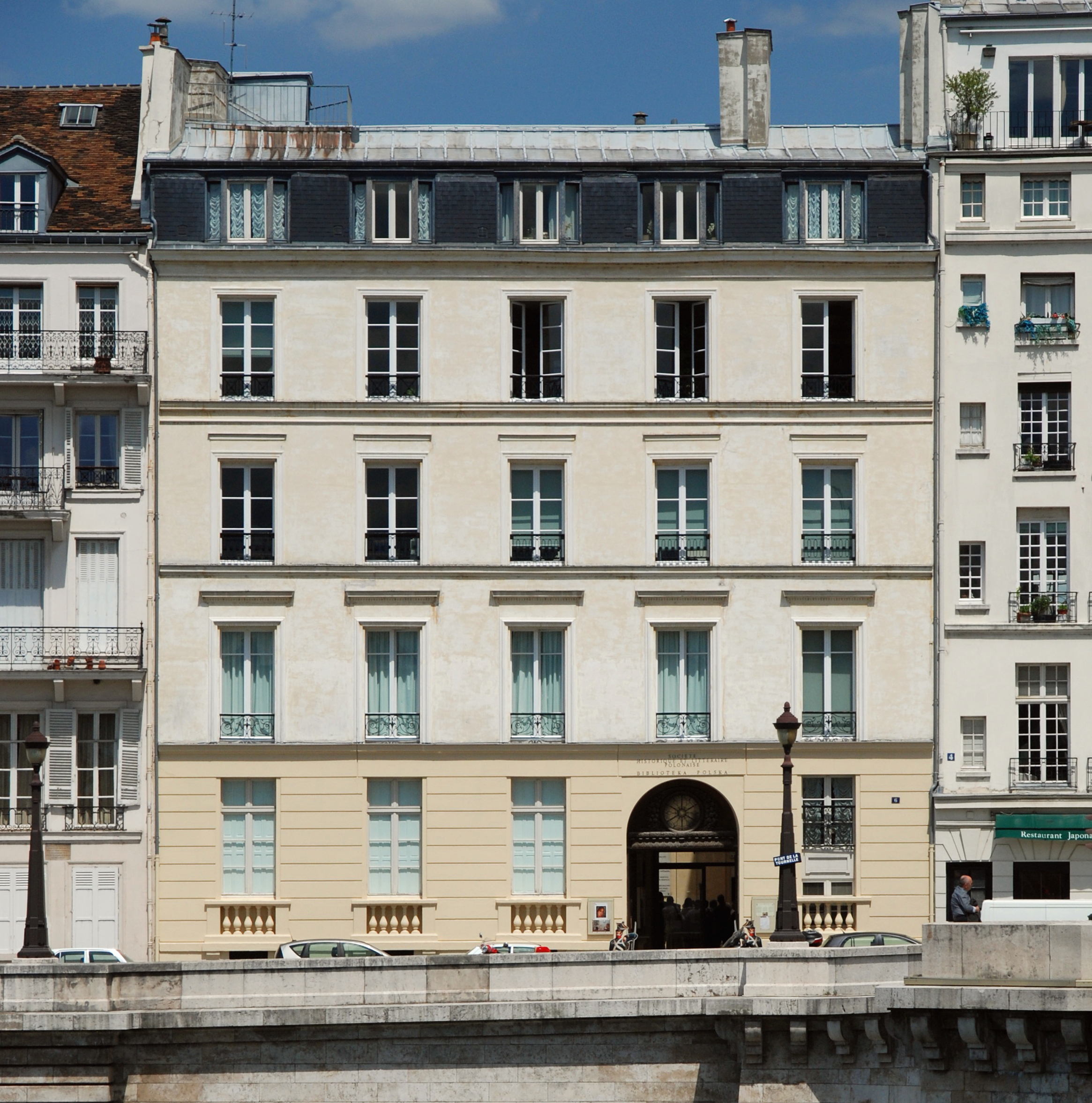
Town house at 6 Quai d'Orleans, the Polish library since 1834

The Quai d'Orleans continues the Quai de Bethune to the west. Like the Quai d'Anjou, it is named for Gaston d'Orleans, the younger brother of Louis XIII. During the French Revolution, it was renamed the Quai d'Egalite until 1806. It joins the Quai de Bourbon at the Saint-Louis bridge, close to the western point of the island. Its notable buildings include the Polish Library (number 6 quai d'Orleans), originally built for Antoine Moreau, the secretary of Louis XIII. It became the Polish Library in 1838. This part of the island had other notable Polish connections; the Polish prince Czartoryski lived nearby on the side of Quai Anjou, and entertained Chopin, while Marie Curie lived nearby on the Quai Bethune. A notable fictional resident was Charles Swann, protagonist of the novel of Marcel Proust Remembrance of Things Past.

The responsibility for the development of the Île Saint-Louis in the 17th century was given to Christophe Marie, general builder for Public Works. In exchange for his pro bono work, he was granted a license to build elegant residences. Along with the nobles, aristocrats, wealthy businessmen and politicians came here to live away from the noise of the inner city. Marie went into partnership with two builders, Lugles Poulletier and François Le Regrattier, and chose Louis Le Vau as architect. In 1614 the ditch between the two islets was filled in; and townhouses were constructed between 1620 and 1650. The island project, an architectural revolution, used a carefully drafted urban plan for the first time in Paris. The urban planning was revolutionary, especially for Paris; it was only under Napoleon III, over 200 years later, that urban planning was implemented citywide. The option to build by just following the topography of the land was no longer available. The new streets were built straight and perpendicular to a central axis. So that the risk of fires was reduced, stone and slate replaced wood, plaster and thatched roofs.

For the first time, dwellings were orientated towards the outside, rather than towards an inner courtyard, with windows and balconies looking out to river views. Courtyards were narrow, with the usual gardens almost nonexistent. The majority of the façades were rather sober, providing charm to the neighborhood. Only a few façades were decorated with heads or faces (mascrons). Only a few of the balconies were adorned with ornate ironwork. The few monumental doors that horse-drawn coaches rushed through hinted at the wealth of the owners. Along with Faubourg Saint-Germain and Le Marais, Île Saint-Louis was one of the most affluent neighborhoods in 17th and 18th century Paris. The Pont Saint-Louis entertainers (i.e., jazz bands, jugglers and mimes) perform on a small bridge that connects Île Saint-Louis with Île de la Cité.

=== Rue Saint-Louis-en-l'Île and the Hôtel Lambert ===
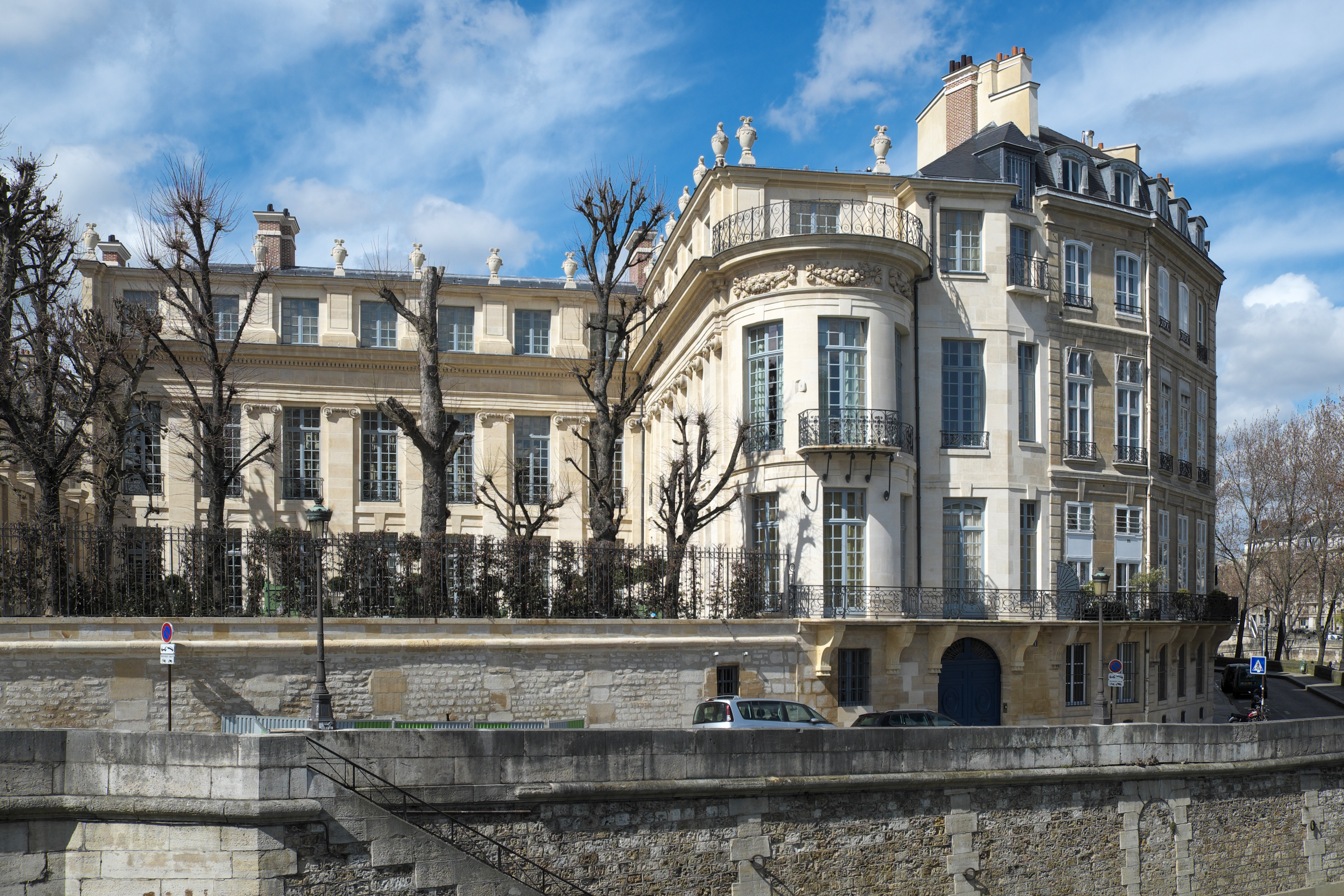
Hôtel Lambert (1640)

The Rue Saint-Louis-en-l'Île is the main commercial street of the island. It is located in the center of the island, going east to west from one end to the other. Despite its commercial character, it still retains many early residential buildings, the most notable of which is Hôtel Lambert, located at the Quai Anjou on the eastern end of the island. This large town house, with a rotunda overlooking the Seine, was constructed beginning in 1640 by the royal architect, Louis Le Vau.

Due to the proximity of the site to the river it was not possible to follow the traditional model of a courtyard in the front and a garden in the back, so Le Vau built the garden and courtyard side by side, with the garden raised to the level of the first floor, or noble floor. The first interior painted decoration was done by Eustache Le Sueur; some of his original panels are now on display in the Louvre. The Hercules Gallery was designed by Charles Le Brun, whose future work for Louis XIV included the Hall of Mirrors in the Palace of Versailles.

Over the years the house had a remarkable series of occupants. In the 18th century, it was purchased by the Marquis de Chatelet, whose wife, Émilie de Breteuil, was for fifteen years the mistress of Voltaire. It became the home of the Polish Prince and patriot Adam Czartoryski in 1843, and welcomed famous writers and musicians, including Balzac, George Sand, Hector Berlioz, Franz Liszt and Frederic Chopin. In the 20th century, it was the home of actress Michèle Morgan, then, in 1975, the art collector Baron Guy de Rothschild, and after his death in 2007, Abdallah Al Thani, brother of the Emir of Qatar. It was seriously damaged by a fire in 2013 but restored.

=== Church of Saint-Louis-en-l'Île ===
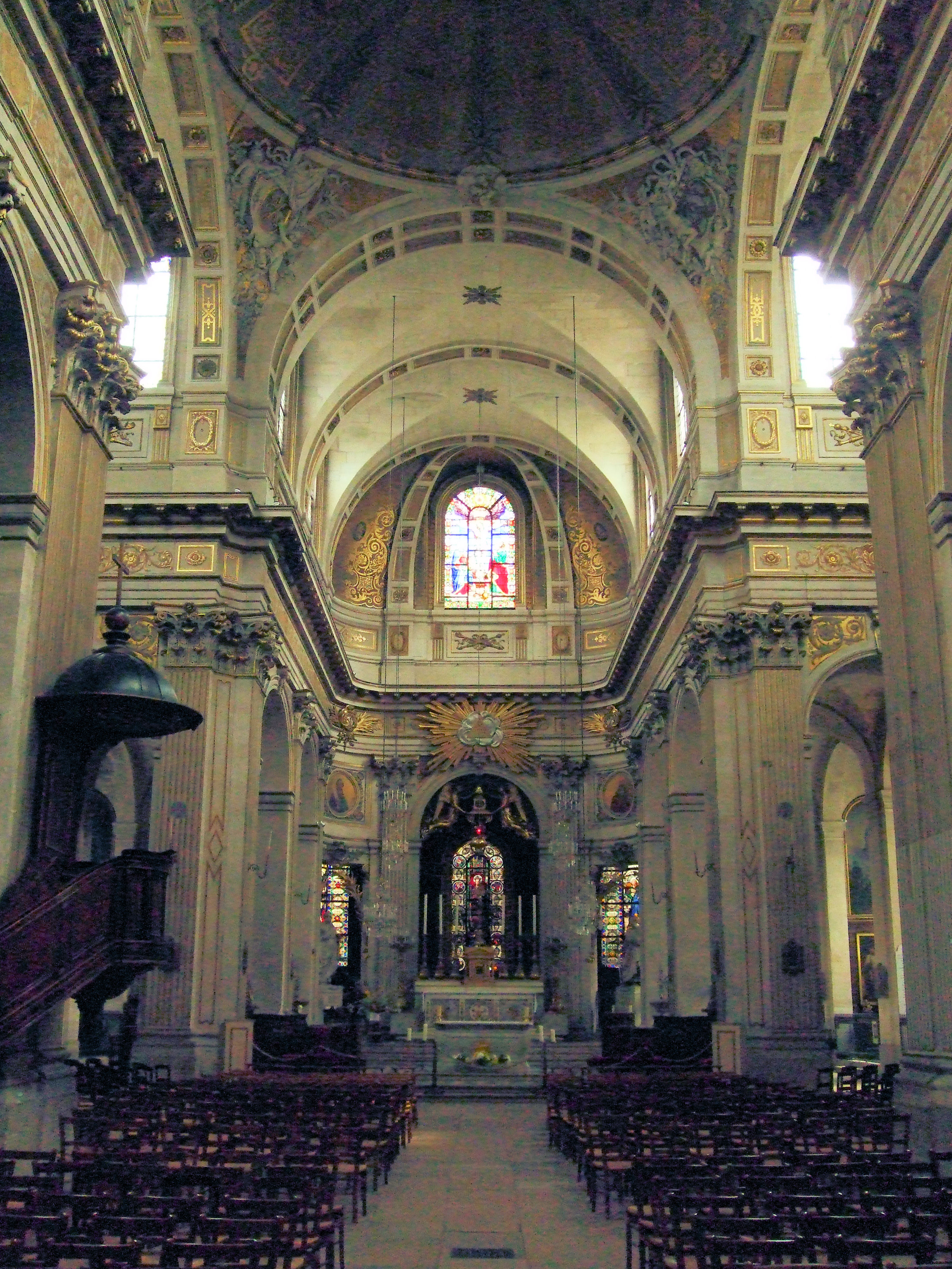
Nave of Saint-Louis-en-l'Ile

The Church of Saint-Louis-en-l'Île, at 19 bis rue Saint-Louis-en-l'Ile, is the only church on the island. It was designed by the architect François Le Vau younger brother of the better-known royal architect Louis Le Vau. It was the only building he designed. The first stone was placed on 1 October 1664 by the Archbishop of Paris, but work was delayed by a shortage of funds and it was not completed until 14 July 1726.

The church lacks the traditional west front which had featured in the plans. Due to the delay in the construction, houses were built next to the church, taking the space. The original bell tower was destroyed by a storm in 1740, and was replaced by a new openwork tower. An unusual feature of the tower is the clock, which hangs over the street like a shop sign.

The interior is a good example of French Baroque architecture, with a central dome or cupola and an abundance of gold and white, a style borrowed from Italy. Pope Pius VII celebrated mass in the building in 1805, during his trip to Paris for the Coronation of Napoleon Bonaparte. The church interior was badly damaged during the French Revolution, but the damage was largely hidden in 1805 by hanging tapestries over the damaged walls. The church has a particularly fine organ, installed in 2005, and the church is frequently used as a venue for concerts.

=== Square Barye ===
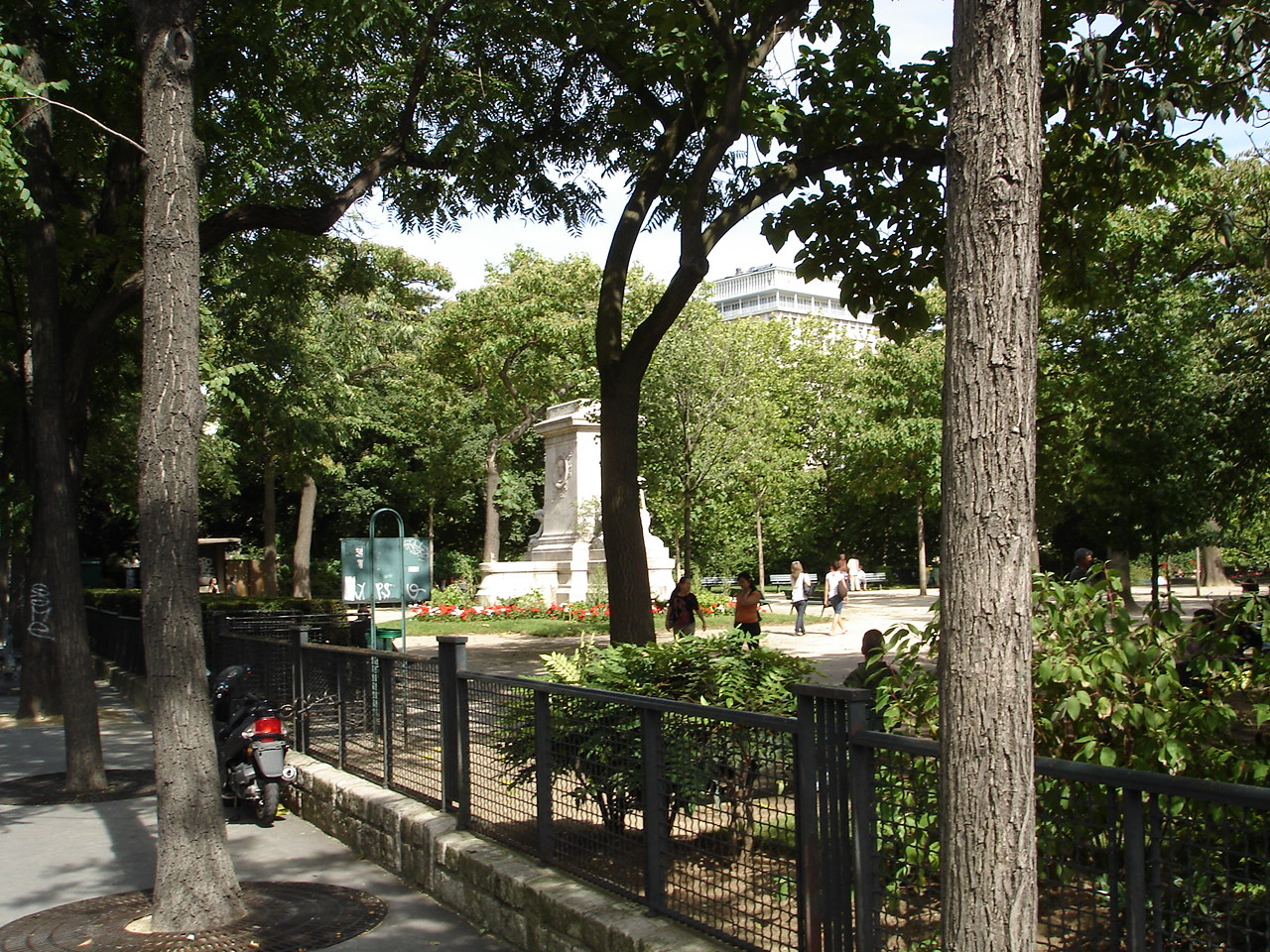
Gardens of Square Barye

Square Barye, on the southeast point of the island, is shaped like a prow of a ship pointing into the Seine. It was originally the site of a convent. It occupies 3,000 square metres (32,000 sq ft), and is a popular park and garden. It takes its name from the 19th-century French sculptor Antoine-Louis Barye, who specialized in sculpture of animals. His work is prominently displayed in the square in front of the Musée d'Orsay.

The most prominent art work in the square is a sculpture of Barye depicting the combat between a mythological centaur and a lapith, made in 1894, and placed on a disproportionally large pedestal. The statue was removed and melted down for its bronze during World War II, but was replaced in 2011 with a copy financed by a Taiwanese donor.

== Bridges that connect to the Île ==
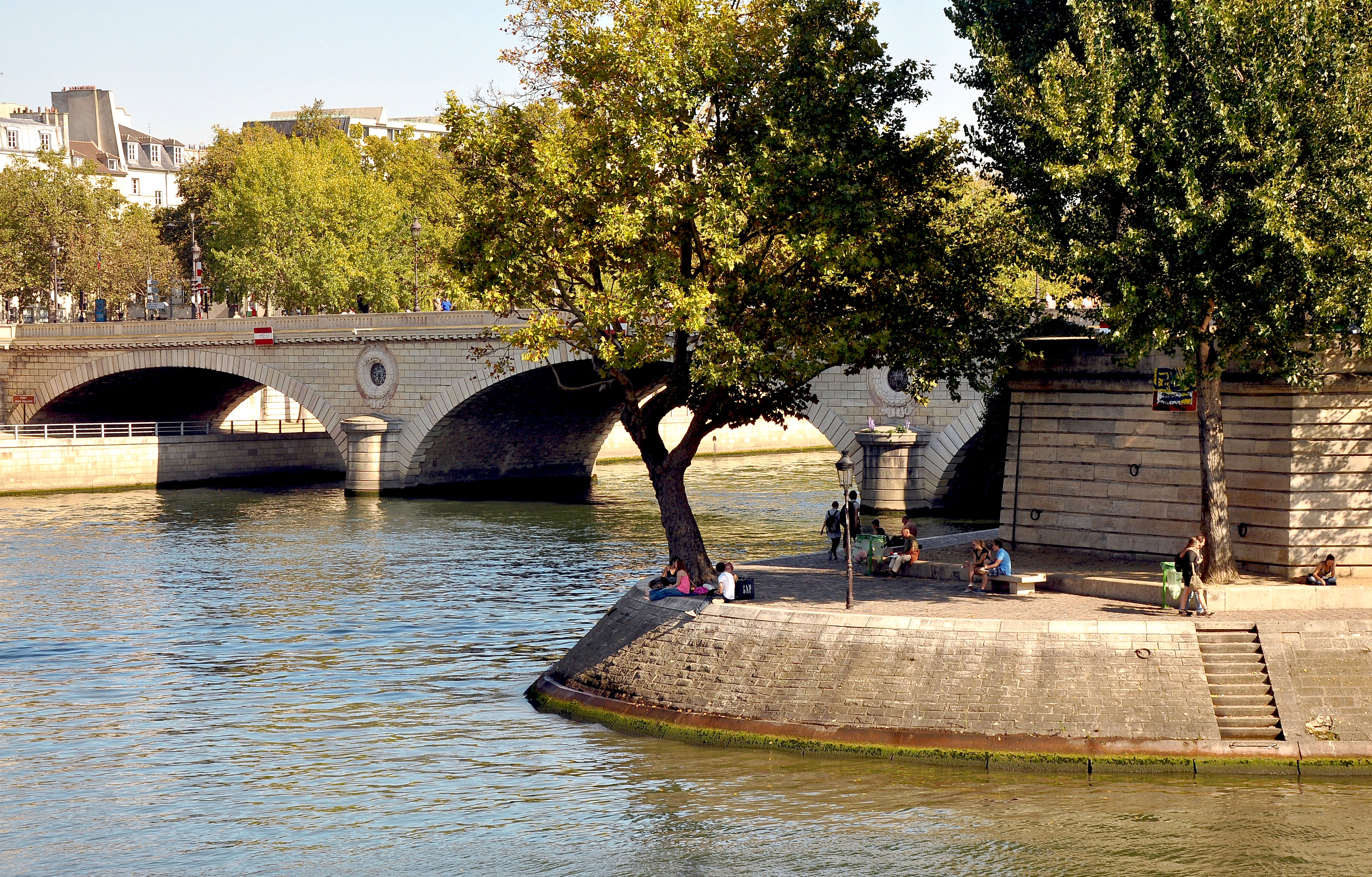
West point of Île Saint-Louis and the Pont Louis-Philippe

- Pont Saint-Louis from the Île de la Cité;
- Pont de la Tournelle from the Rive Gauche;
- Pont Louis-Philippe from the Rive Droite;
- Pont Marie from the Rive Droite;
- Pont Sully from the Rive Droite and the Rive Gauche.
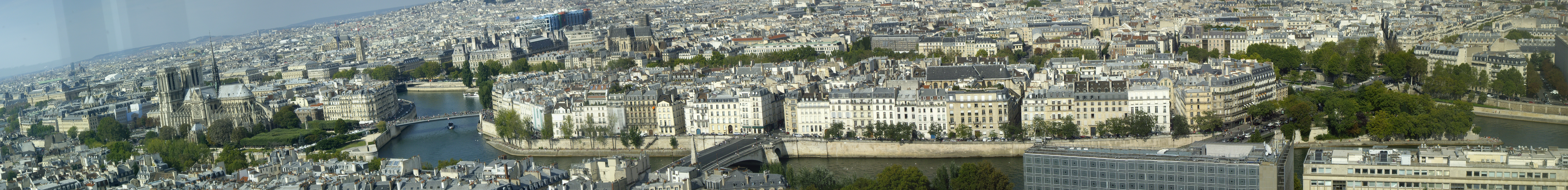
Île Saint Louis seen from the Tour Zamansky on the Rive Gauche. To the left is the Île de la Cité, with Notre Dame de Paris.

== See also ==
- Glaces Berthillon

== Bibliography ==
- Fierro, Alfred (1996). Histoire et dictionnaire de Paris. Robert Laffont. ISBN 2-221--07862-4.
- Lecompte, Francis (2013). Notre-Dame, Île de la Cité et Île Saint-Louis (in English and French). Massin. ISBN 978-2-7072-0835-4.
- Poisson, Michel (2009). 1000 Immeubles et Monuments de Paris. Parigramme. ISBN 978-2-84096-539-8.
- Downie, David (2005), Paris, Paris: Journey into the City of Light, Fort Bragg: Transatlantic Press, ISBN 0-9769251-0-9: "Island in the Seine", pp. 10–17
- DeJean, Joan. "'Enchanted Island': The Ile Saint-Louis" in her How Paris Became Paris: The Invention of the Modern City. New York: Bloomsbury, 2014. ISBN 978-1-60819-591-6. Chapter 3, pp. 62–76.
