= Berthillon =

French manufacturer and retailer of ice cream

Coordinates: 48.851694°N 2.356694°E

- Industry: manufacture of ice creams and sorbets
- Incorporated: France
- Founded: 1954
- Founder: Raymond Berthillon
- Headquarters: Île Saint-Louis, Paris, France

Berthillon is a French manufacturer and retailer of luxury ice cream and sorbet, with its primary store on the Île Saint-Louis, in Paris, France. The company is owned and operated by the Chauvin family, descendants of Raymond Berthillon, who from 1954 operated a café and hotel called "Le Bourgogne".

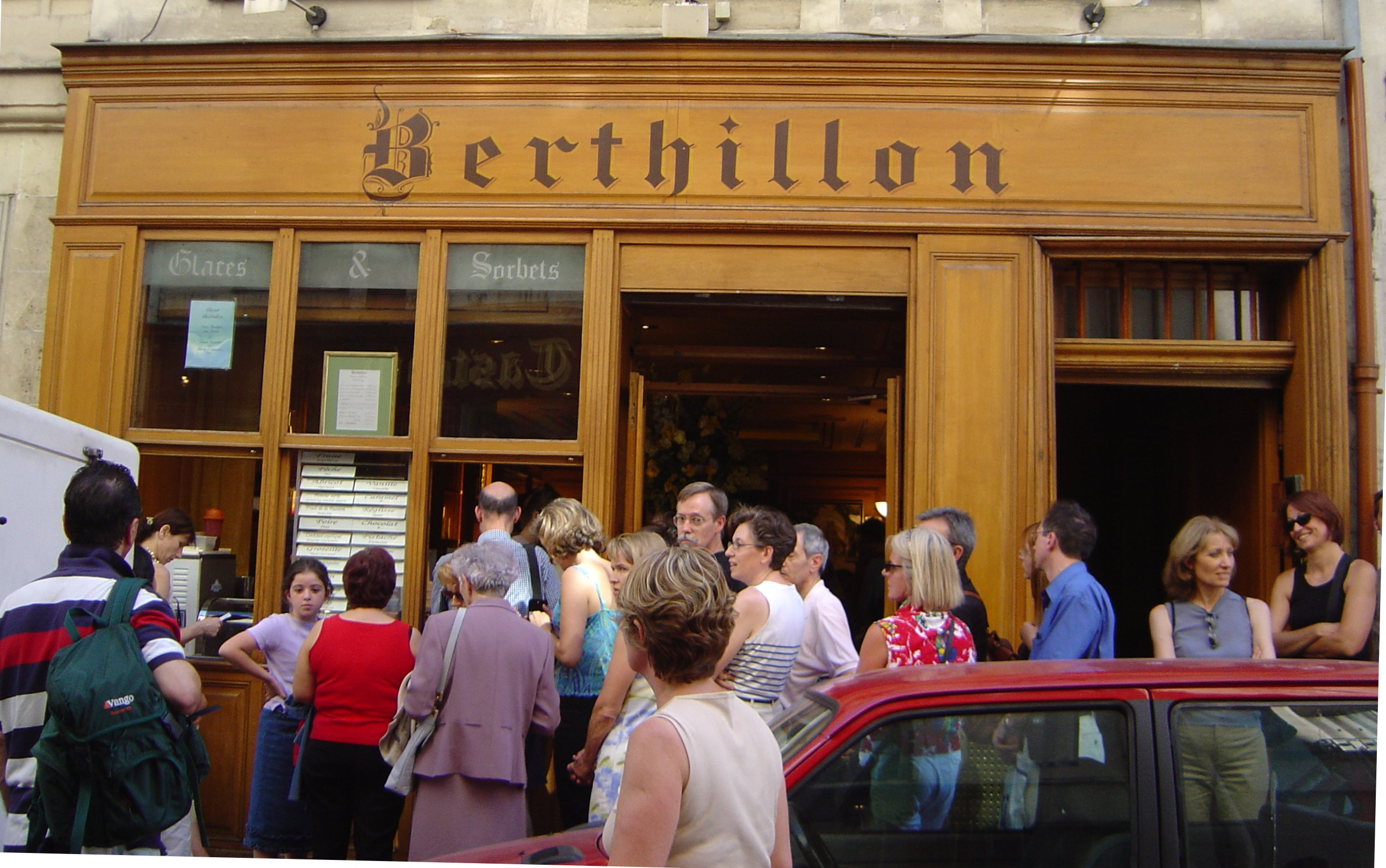
Storefront in Paris

The ice cream shop gained wider recognition in 1961 after it was featured in the French restaurant guide Gault Millau, which described it as "an astonishing ice cream shop hidden in a bistro on the Ile Saint-Louis" The business is noted for its use of fresh ingredients and for maintaining the recipe of its sorbet as a trade secret.

Berthillon is probably the only ice cream maker that closes in summer, for five weeks in July and August.

Raymond Berthillon, founder of Berthillon, died on 9 August 2014.
