= Pont Saint-Louis =

Bridge in Paris, France

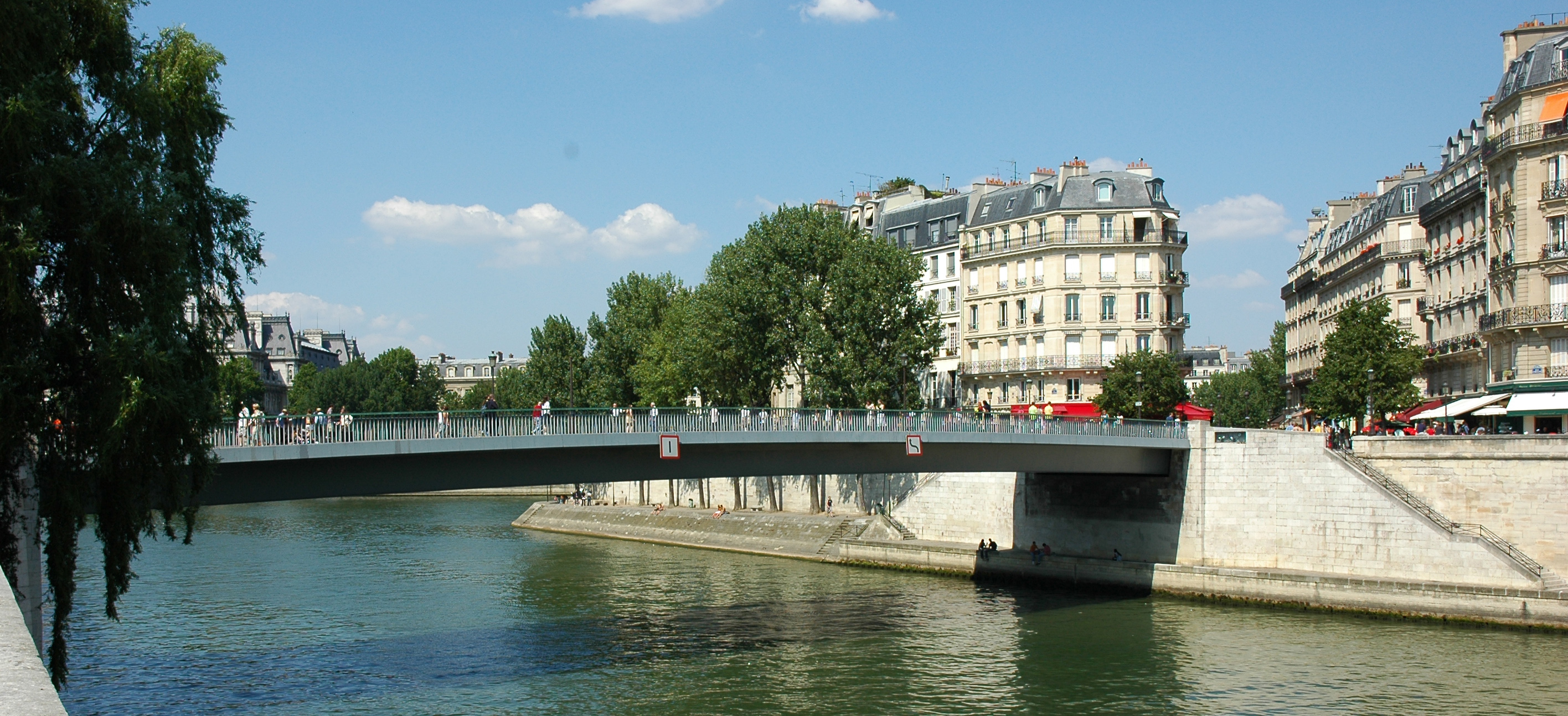
- Coordinates: 48°51′10″N 02°21′10″E
- Locale: Paris, France
- Next upstream: Pont de la Tournelle
- Next downstream: Pont d'Arcole

Characteristics
- Total length: 67 m
- Width: 16 m

History
- Construction start: 1969
- Construction end: 1970

The pont Saint-Louis (French pronunciation: [pɔ̃ sɛ̃ lwi]) is a pedestrian bridge across the River Seine in the 4th arrondissement of Paris. It links the Île de la Cité with the Île Saint-Louis. It is served by the Cité stop of the Paris Metro.

== History ==
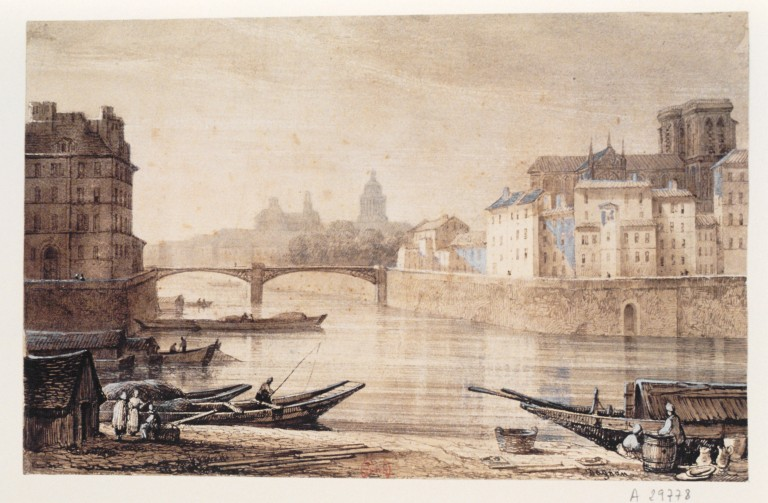
The bridge in the 19th century

Location on the Seine

The present bridge is the seventh to link the two islands since 1630. The pont Saint-Landry (1630–1634) was the first of these.

In 1717 a wooden bridge was rebuilt, with seven arches, and named the "Pont Rouge", due to the colour in which it was painted. It was destroyed in 1795. In 1804, under the direction of the engineer Dumoustier, a new two-arch bridge was built, 70 m long and 10 m wide, and mainly in oak. It was demolished in 1811, and a suspension bridge replaced it in 1842. Twenty years later, this was replaced by a metallic bridge, with a single arch with a 64 m opening. In 1939, this one was demolished. In 1941, it was replaced by a passerelle resembling an iron cage. In 1968, the present bridge was begun, and inaugurated in 1970.
