= Pont de la Tournelle =

Parisian bridge over the Seine

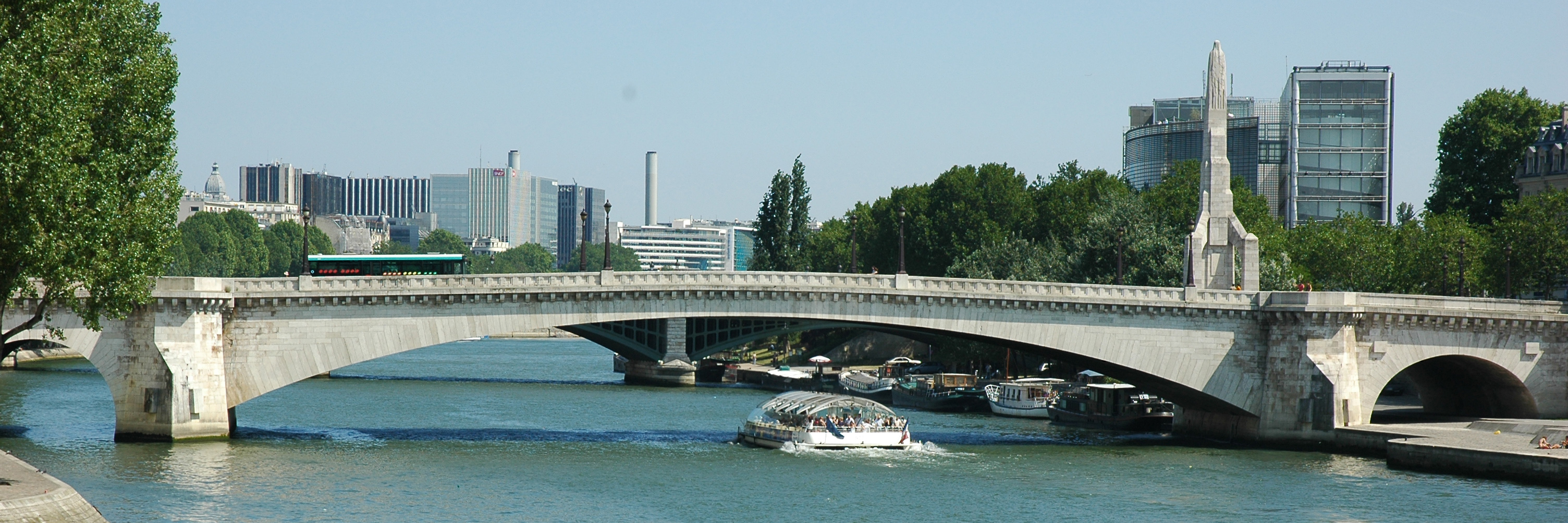
- Pont de la Tournelle
- Coordinates: 48°51′02.50″N 02°21′20.00″E
- Crosses: Seine
- Locale: Paris, France
- Official name: Pont de la Tournelle
- Maintained by: Civil Service
- Next upstream: Pont de Sully
- Next downstream: Pont Saint-Louis; Pont de l'Archevêché

Characteristics
- Design: Arch bridge
- Total length: 122 m (400 ft)
- Width: 23 m (75 ft)
- Clearance above: 7 m (central arch)

History
- Opened: 1928 (current structure)

Location
- Interactive map of Pont de la Tournelle

The Pont de la Tournelle (French pronunciation: [pɔ̃ də la tuʁnɛl], Tournelle Bridge), is an arch bridge spanning the river Seine in Paris.

== History ==
The location of the Pont de la Tournelle is the site of successive structures.

The first, a wooden bridge, was built in 1620. This bridge connected the Eastern bank of the Seine (le quai Saint-Bernard) to l'île Saint-Louis. It was subsequently washed away by ice in 1637, and again on 21 January 1651. A stone bridge was erected in its place in 1654. It was demolished in 1918 and replaced by the current bridge in 1928, after it suffered several natural disasters, especially the flood of 1910.

The Pont de la Tournelle was intentionally built lacking symmetry, in order to emphasize the shapeless landscape in the part of the Seine that it bestrides. Consisting of a grand central arch that links the riverbanks via two smaller arches, one on each side, it's decorated on the Eastern bank with a pylon built on the left pier's cutwater, and a statue of Saint Geneviève, the patron saint of Paris, atop of the pylon, designed by Polish-French monumental sculptor Paul Landowski.

The term "Tournelle" traces its origin to a square turret (French: tourelle) constructed at the end of the 12th Century on the fortress of Phillipe Auguste.

Numerous scenes of Highlander: The Series were filmed along the Quai de la Tournelle near and underneath Pont de la Tournelle between 1992 and 1998.

Location on the Seine

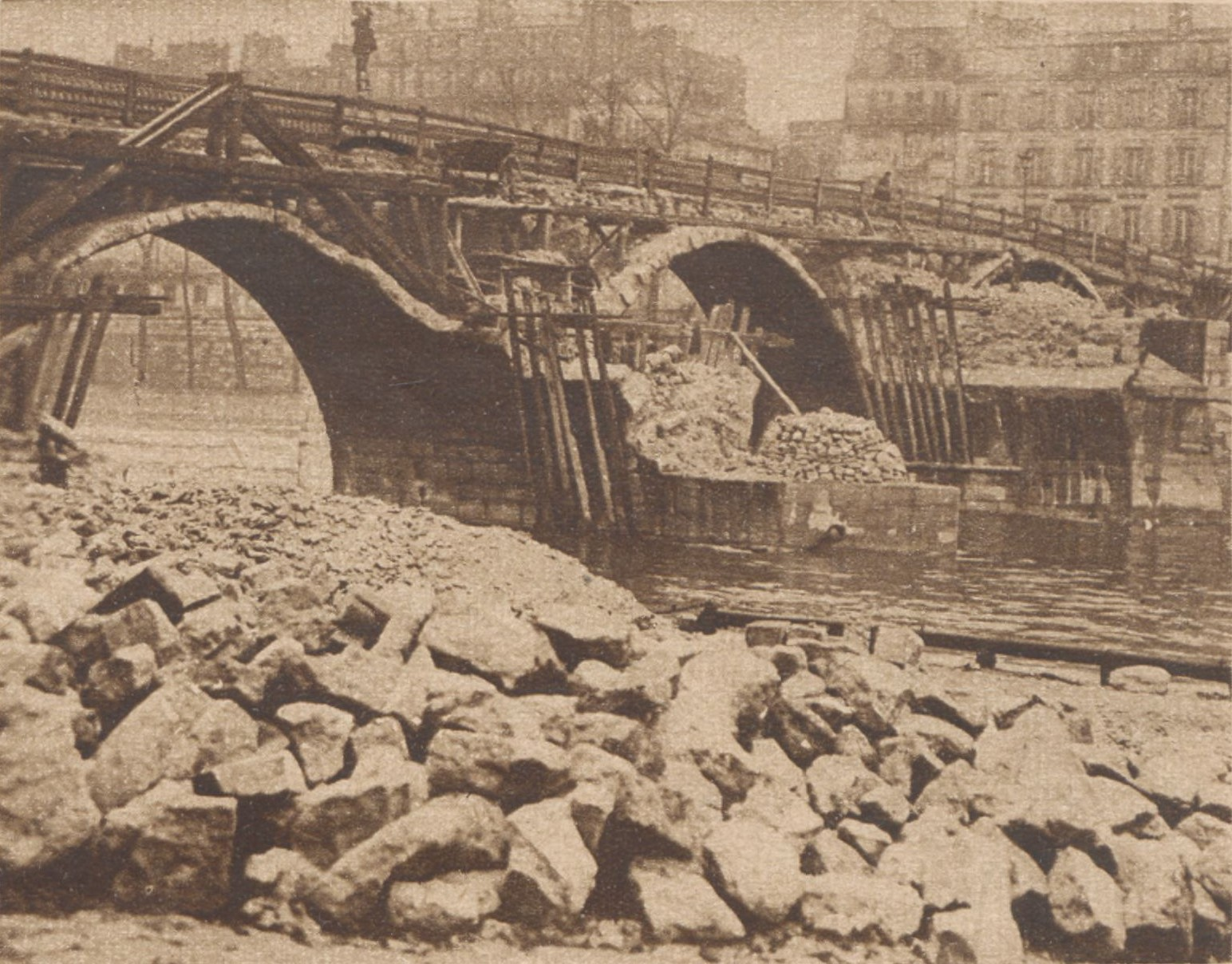
Demolition of the Pont de la Tournelle (published in Le Miroir (magazine)

== Access ==
Located near the Metro station: Pont Marie.

== See also ==
- List of crossings of the River Seine
