= Voguéo =

Former water taxi service in Paris, France

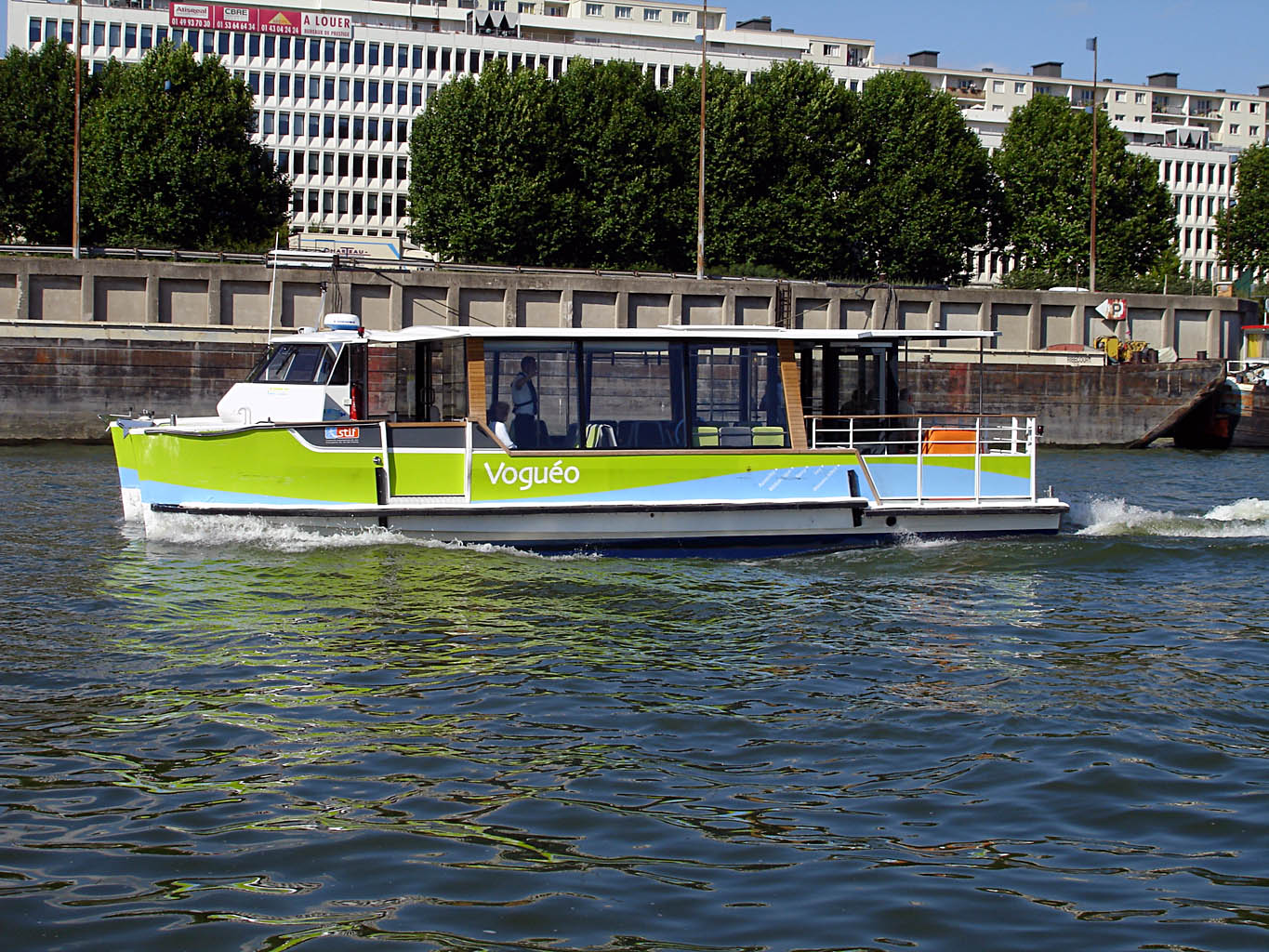
- Locale: Île-de-France
- Waterway: Seine, Marne
- Transit type: Water taxi
- Owner: STIF
- Operator: Batobus
- Began operation: 28 June 2008
- Ended operation: 5 June 2011
- System length: 4.63 km (2.88 mi)
- No. of vessels: 4 catamarans
- No. of terminals: 8
- Website: www.vogueo.fr

Voguéo was a water taxi service operated on the rivers Seine and the Marne in the Île-de-France (the area around Paris).

The Syndicat des transports d'Île-de-France (STIF) adopted the service in 2007. It started on 28 June 2008 between the Gare d'Austerlitz in the 13th arrondissement of Paris and the École Vétérinaire de Maisons-Alfort Métro station. Between the two termini the journey took 38 minutes, and the following year this was reduced to 28.

Unlike the tourist river services in Paris (such as the bateaux-mouches), this new route was different. It was designed for commuters, not tourists, and financed by the STIF, which meant it could be integrated into the existing fare system for the Île-de-France (see the section on fares and financing, below). For the occasional traveller, a one-time ticket was sold on board. The route revived passenger river transport on the Seine, since it disappeared in 1934 from competition with the rail network. Service was provided by the Compagnie des Batobus with catamarans specially built by Fountaine-Pajot.

On 5 June 2011 this "experimental service" closed, although there was due to be a fuller service starting "some time in 2013" which has not materialised.

== History ==
A video of the Voguéo at its terminus, Charenton-le-Pont.

=== Timeline ===
- 1837: First appearance of steamboats, operated by the Compagnie des Bateaux à Vapeur de Paris à Saint-Cloud
- 1866: Reorganisation of passenger riverboat services and formation of the Compagnie des Bateaux-Omnibus
- 1917: Termination of the river routes because of low passenger numbers
- 1921: Creation of a route operated by the Société des transports en commun de la région parisienne (STCRP)
- 5 May 1934: Termination of river services on the Seine
- 11 July 2007: The STIF launches an experimental water taxi on the eastern reach of the Seine
- October 2007: Operations are contracted to the Compagnie des Batobus for two and a half years, four catamarans are ordered from Fountaine-Pajot
- End of November 2007: The Voguéo name and logo are unveiled
- 11 April 2008: The first boat is launched on the Seine
- 28 June 2008: Opening of the first five-stop route
- 1 June 2009: Increase of service frequency
- 5 June 2011: Closure of the experimental service

=== Paris water taxis ===
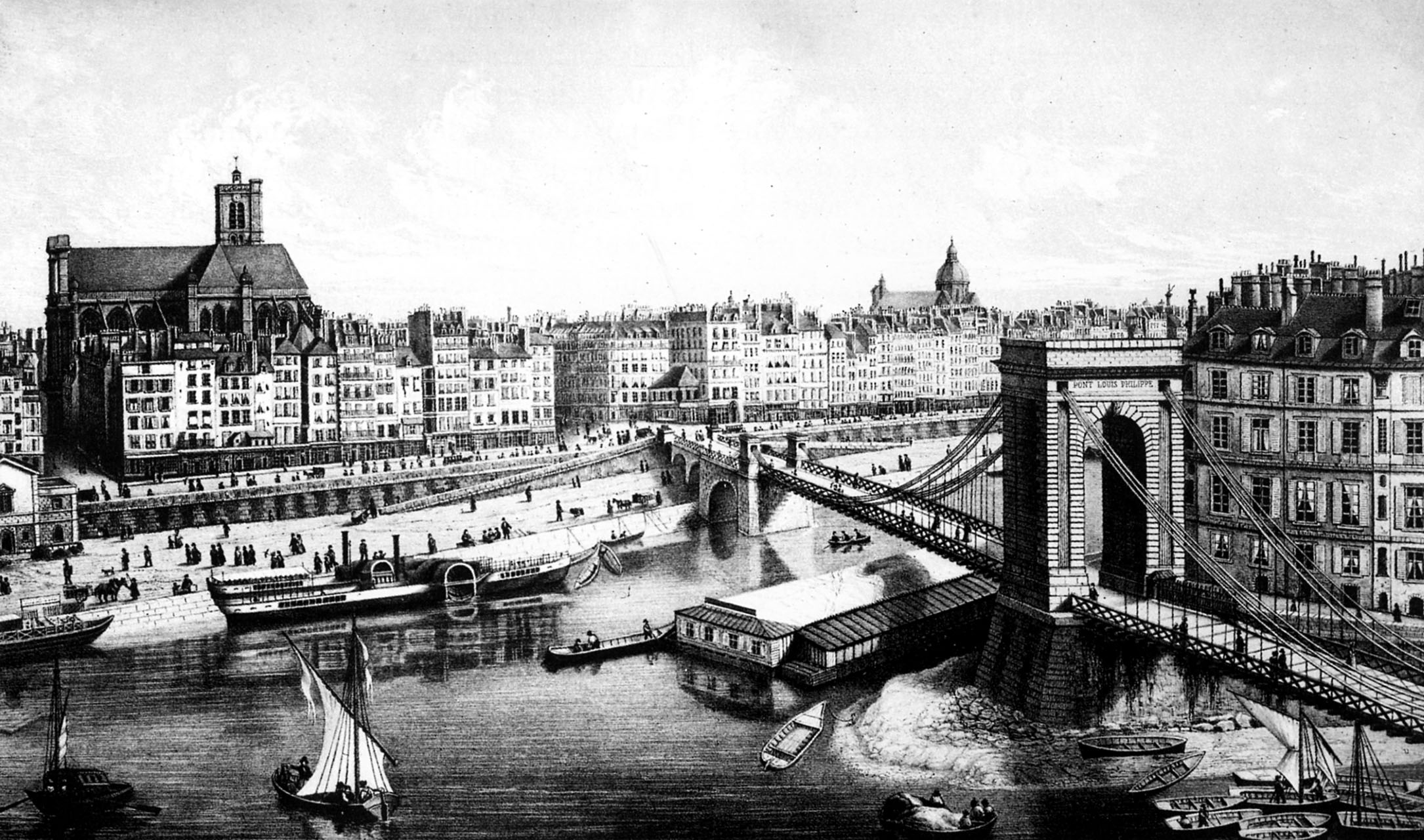
Steam-driven paddle steamers on the Seine near the Pont Louis-Philippe, around 1840

Water taxis on the Seine operated for many years, but were rapidly made redundant at the start of the 20th century with the development of rail transport. Some were local to the inner city like the Paris Métro, while others reached out to the suburbs like the railways, such as the Vincennes line. Until 1828, with the creation of horse-drawn buses, (Note: Excepting the brief life of Blaise Pascal's Carrosses à cinq sols between 1662 and 1677.) passenger river traffic was the only mode of public transport in the Île-de-France.

Until the 19th century, horse-drawn boats and galiots served a steady stream of passengers on the river. Until the canal excavations around the river and the creation of locks downstream to Rouen under the reign of Louis-Philippe I, most of the traffic travelled upstream from Paris. At the end of the 17th century, and in the 18th, boats relayed goods to Montereau and Sens, in Yonne. Others served as passenger transport from the Pont Royal in Paris to the villages of Passy, Auteuil, Meudon, Sèvres and Saint-Cloud, downstream, and were particularly frequent on Sundays and holidays after the opening of the public Parc de Saint-Cloud by Queen Marie Antoinette, and the establishment of a funfair in September. An order of 23 March 1735 fixed the fares for river journeys: two French sols for Chaillot and Passy, four for Sèvres and Saint-Cloud, and up to two sols for each stop beyond. It took two hours to travel from Paris to Saint-Cloud.

From 1837, river barges were steadily replaced by steamboats with free connections with the many bus lines, such as the Compagnie des Bateaux à Vapeur de Paris à Saint-Cloud. Under the Second French Empire, the river navigation was reorganised, and reinforced for the 1867 Éxposition Universelle, which took place on the Champ de Mars, Paris.

The Compagnie des Bateaux-Omnibus was established in 1866. It provided river transport between Charenton and Suresnes with a fleet of paddle steamers, similar to those used since 1864 on the river Saône in Lyon and built in the Lyon district of La Mouche, from which the name Bateau Mouche comes. The service had a strong reputation with the public, and the Préfecture set the fares, timetables and frequencies.

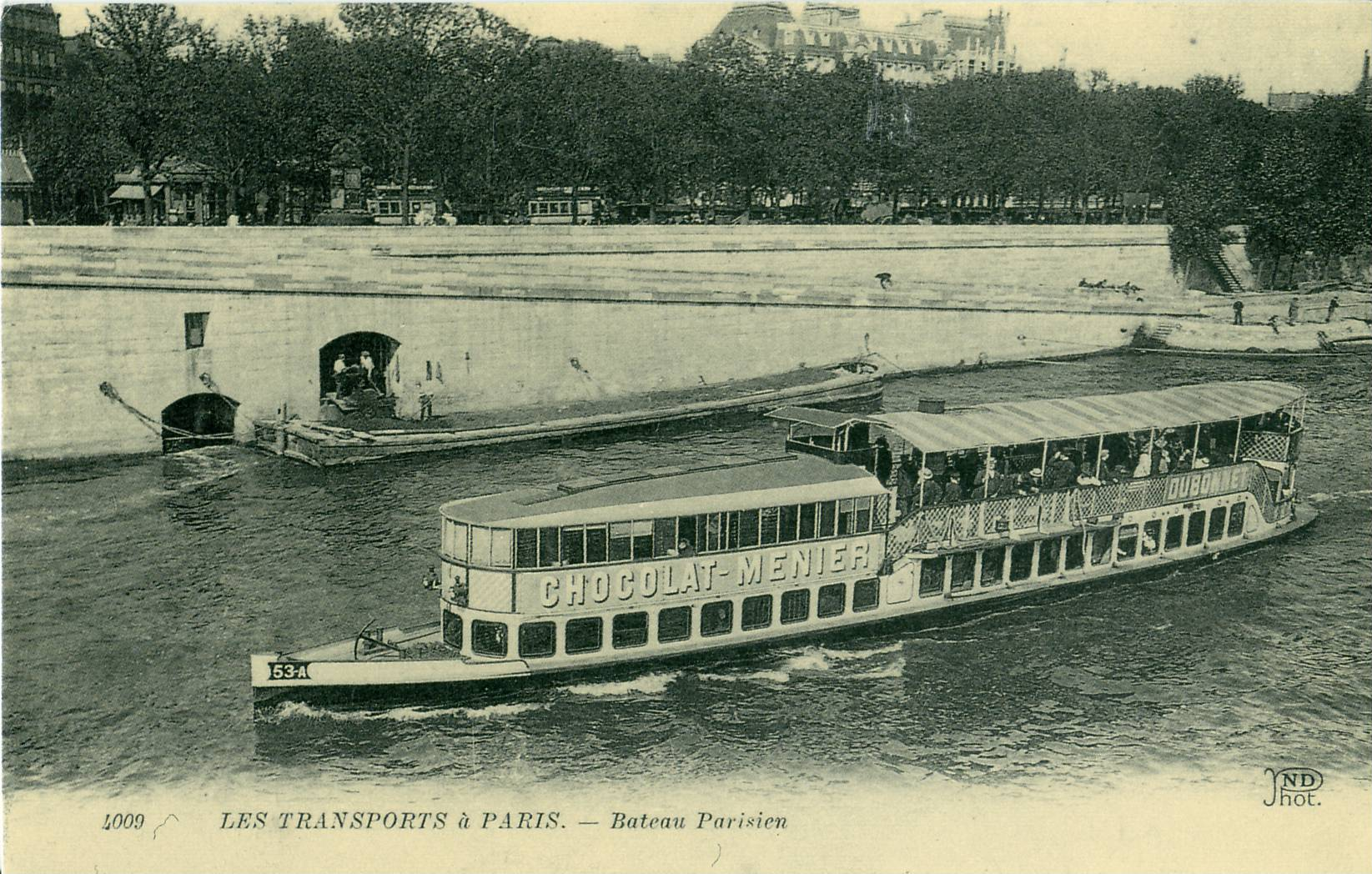
A steamboat of the Compagnies des Bateaux Parisiens, some time before 1917

Several companies swiftly followed: in 1876 the Compagnie des Hirondelles Parisiennes operated eighteen pontoons, twelve of them in Paris. In response, the Compagnie des Bateaux-Omnibus reduced its fares and increased the number of boats in service. But the fierce competition turned out to be disastrous, and in 1878, the two companies ran operations jointly. A third player appeared in 1885, the Compagnie des Bateaux Express, which operated fast boats with lower fares on the Marne between Lagny-sur-Marne and Charenton, and another line from Charenton to Suresnes. In 1886, the several companies merged under the name Compagnie générale des bateaux parisiens.

This company ran three lines: Tuileries–Suresnes, Charenton–Auteuil and Austerlitz-–Auteuil. A fourth opened in 1895 between the Louvre and Ablon-sur-Seine. The Charenton–Auteuil line was the busiest, with a flat fare of 20 centimes, more on Sundays and holidays. Traffic was immense, with 25 million annual journeys (around 70 thousand a day) between 1886 and 1900, over a route totalling 39 km (24 mi) from Charenton-le-Pont to Suresnes totalling 47 stops. Service was provided by a fleet of 107 boats. River traffic reached its zenith during the Exposition Universelle of 1900 with 42 million passengers, but after 1900 the service quickly declined with the evolution of the electric tramways and the opening of the Paris Métro dealt a fatal blow. In 1913, there were 13 million passengers, but traffic collapsed during the First World War, and service finished in 1917 from a lack of passengers.

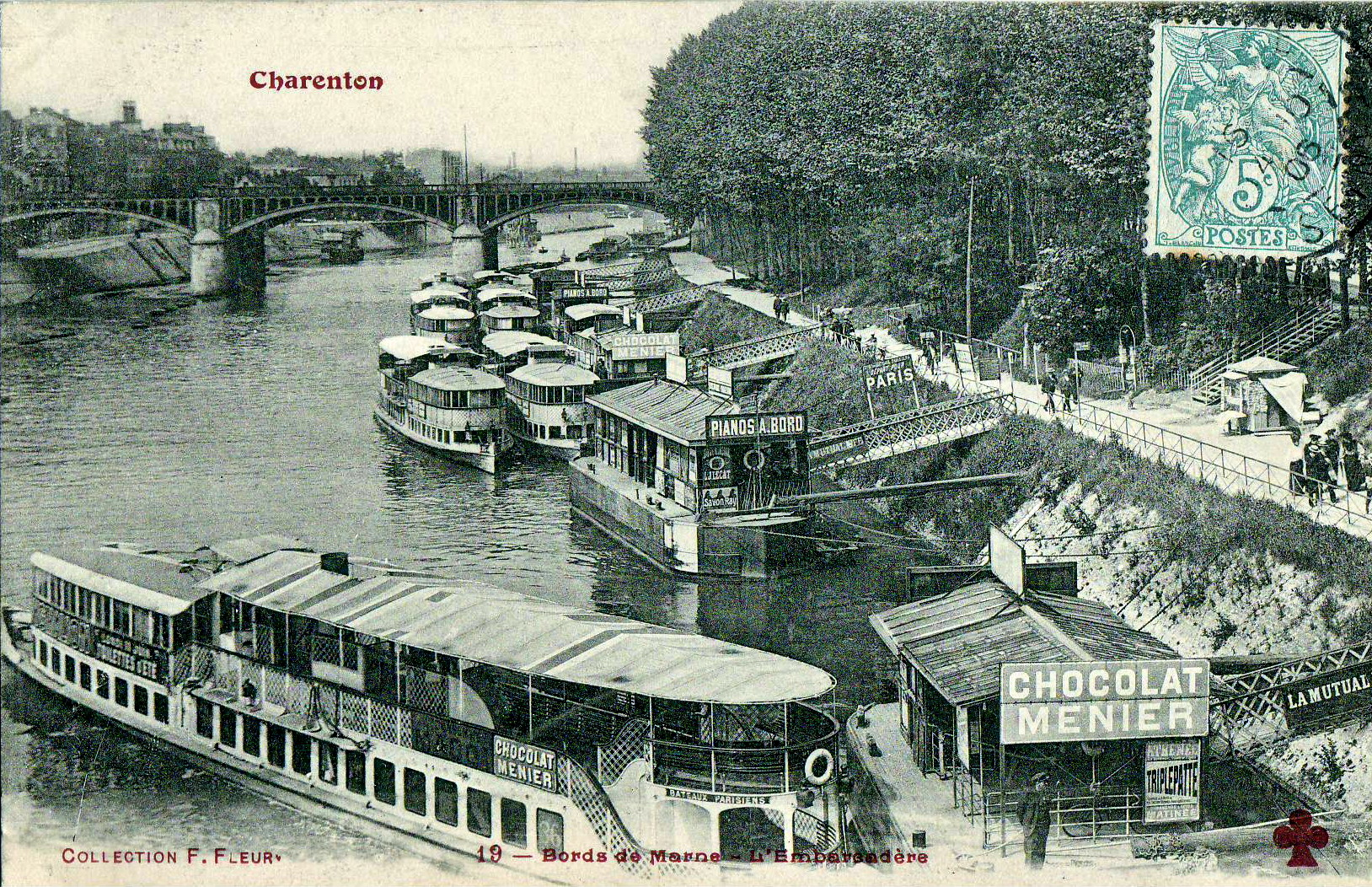
The Bateaux Parisiens's pier at Charenton-le-Pont. Several of the company's boats surround the quay.

In 1921 the STCRP, the predecessor of the RATP, won the concession for Parisian riverboats. On 4 May, a line opened between Maisons-Alfort and the Louvre, then extended to Auteuil, but the traffic numbers anticipated by the Conseil général of the Seine department, of around seven million passengers a year, turned out to be less than two million. Changes in the fares and routes, aiming to make them more attractive, gave some relief for a while: in 1923, passenger numbers were nearly 5 million. But the decline then continued, and steepened with competition from the quicker railways, and so in 1926 it was decided to suspend winter services, from 1 November to 1 March. In 1933, traffic was less than 1.3 million passengers.

River connections finished on 5 May 1934 by a decision of the Conseil géneral, blaming passenger numbers. Since then the Seine, in Paris, saw only merchant traffic, and a few pleasure boats, until the 1950s, when the first private tourist service opened, with old units restored and adapted.

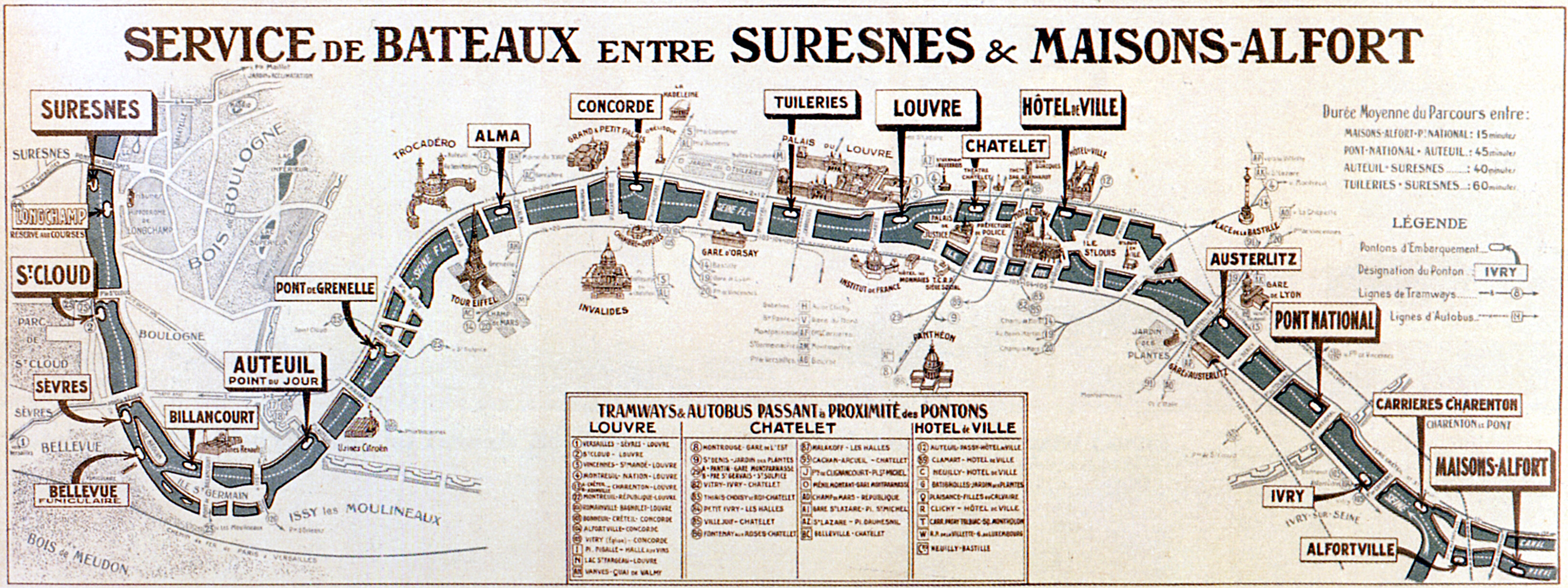
Route map between Suresnes and Maisons-Alfort around 1900. This river service disappeared in 1917, but with Voguéo has partly resumed, between Maisons-Alfort and Austerlitz.

=== Birth of the Voguéo ===
Before 2008, boat services were run only by the Bateau mouche companies, who catered more for tourists than commuters. Not being a public service, the fares were not restricted by the regional Syndicat des transports d'Île-de-France (Paris region transport commission), and were much higher than other public transport fares, the highest in the region. The bateaux-mouches also did not accept public transport tickets such as the Paris T or the Carte Orange.

The only ostensibly public service was the Batobus, but this was not convenient from where commuters actually lived, and would not accept the common commuter tickets, its prices were designed for tourists. Prices were too high for Parisiens: the Batobus service introduced an annual season ticket priced at €55, but the daily price stayed at €12. Also, its hours of operation was not suited to commuters, in the morning it started at 10am in the tourist season, and in the winter, the last boat left at 4pm.

In response, from July 2007 a regular service was inaugurated along the Paris canals, the Canal Saint-Martin and the Canal Saint-Denis, for commuters who worked in the Parc du Millénaire (on the border of the 19th Arrondissement and Aubervilliers), a center for newspaper and other media workers. This was all set up by Icade, the owner of two such presses and also amusement parks. The canal boats were 14.5 metres (48 ft) long, made by Alternatives Énergies by a company titled Vedettes de Paris, who later merged with Transdev. Beyond all expectations, it got 400 passengers a day.

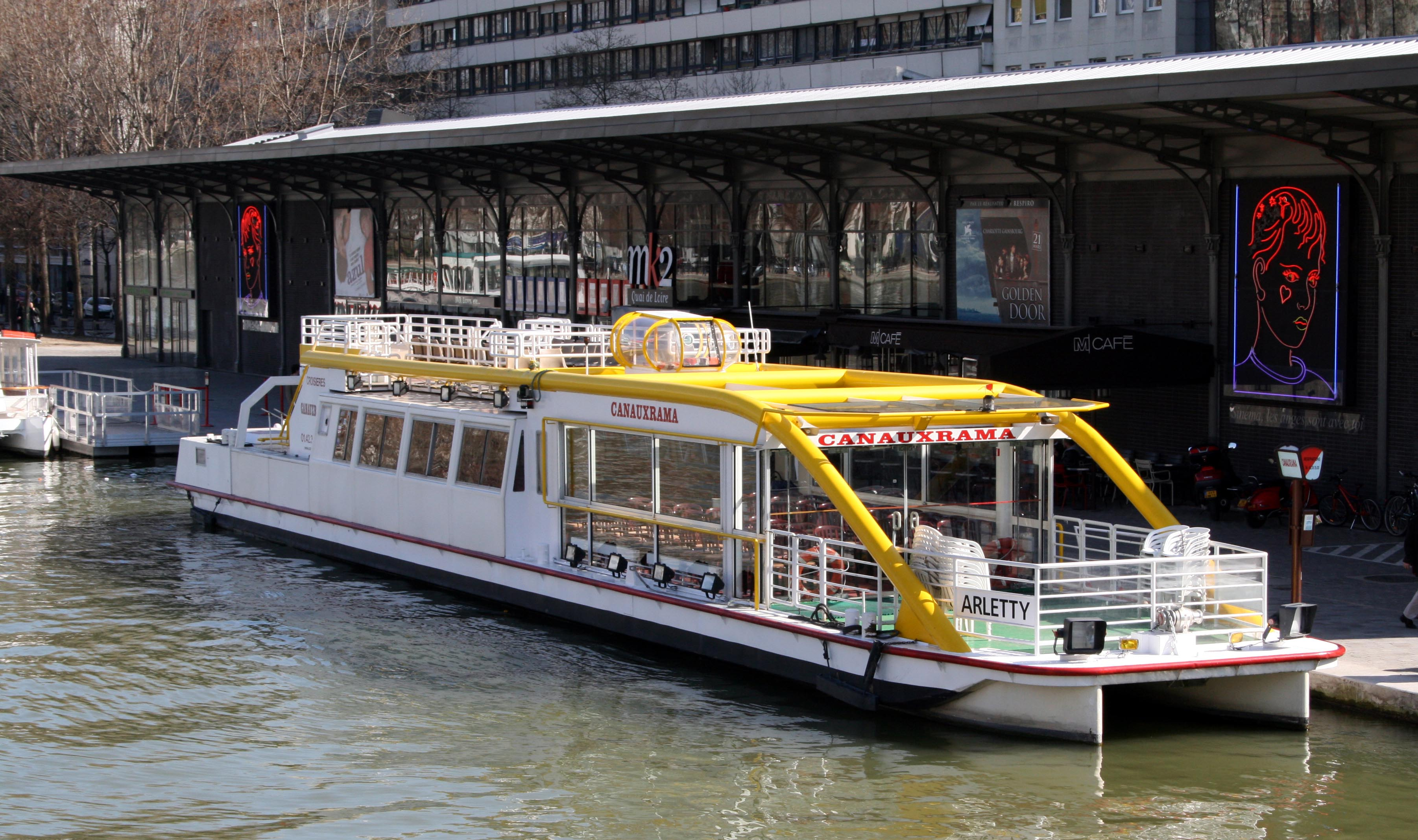
The boat Arletty in front of the MK2 Quai de Loire / Quai de Seine.

Even so, the cinema multiplex at MK2 Quai de Loire / Quai de Seine had a small halt stop to let their clients alight, crossing the Bassin de la Villette to the other side of the canal.

But the need for public transport, as opposed to tourist transport, became ever more apparent, and the SCIF proposed a new system for the purpose. A referendum of Parisiens voted against it in 2006, but it was pushed through: traveling by river was now the fashion.

In 2000, the Mayor of London had put in riverboats for commuters along the Thames, connecting with the London Underground. The boats were quicker than the Tube, and were an immediate success. They accepted the London Oyster cards and other through ticketing cards for commuters. In France, Nantes took up the baton in 2003 with its Navibus service, with a pleasure-boat, which was also immediately successful. So the Parisien authorities started to think whether such systems would also work there.

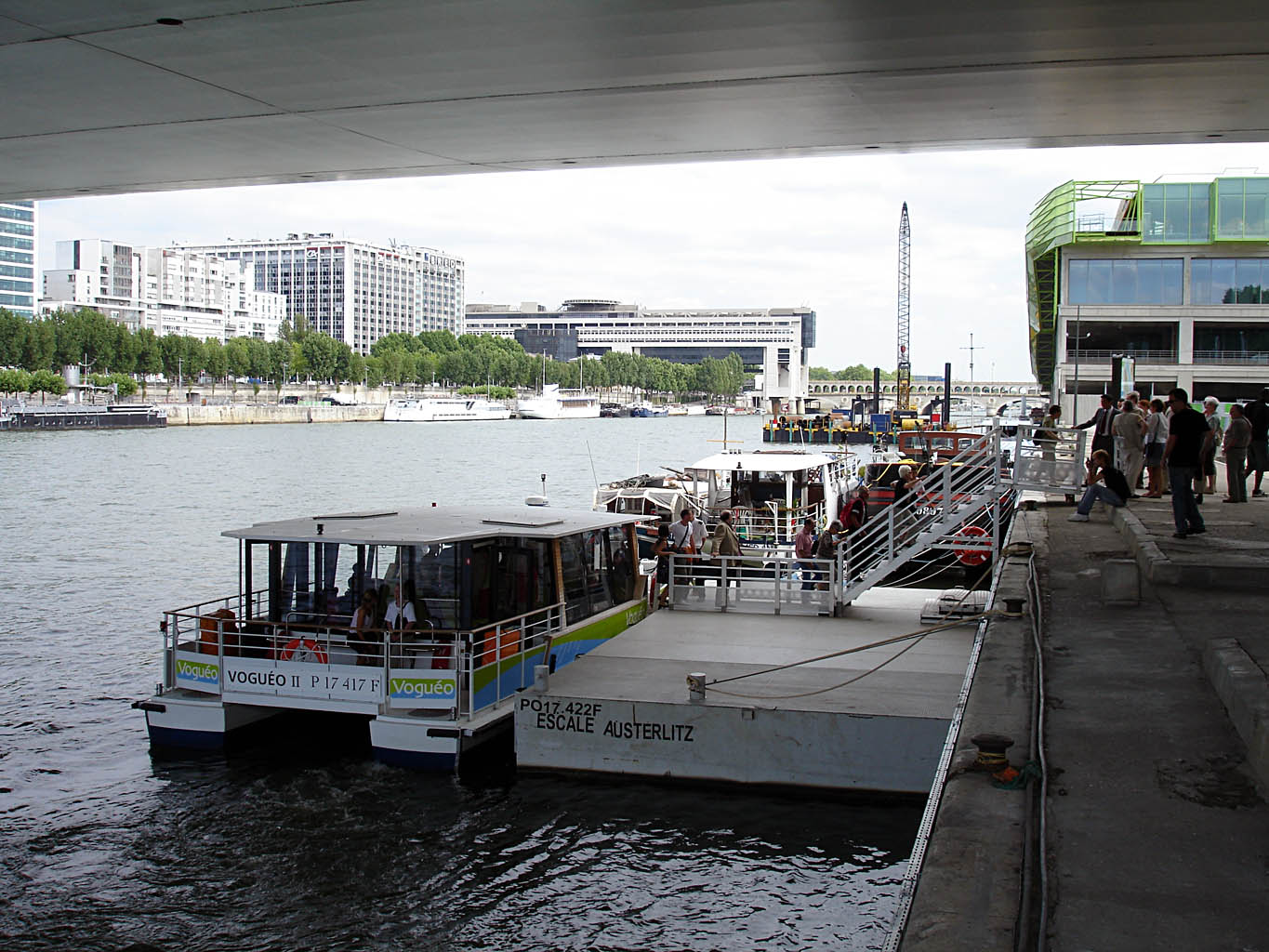
The Austerlitz Stairs at the Pont Charles-de-Gaulle, winter 2008.

The report of the STIF of 11 July 2007 called officially for an experimental riverboat system along the Seine, integrated into the Metro and other transport networks. In October, this service started, with the contract awarded to Batobus for two and a half years. Four catamarans were ordered from the boatbuilder Fountaine-Pajot. On 22 November 2007 the project got its official name, Voguéo.

So at the end of December, the service was on its way. Four catamarans had been ordered, to enter service in January 2008, and the operations base had been set up at Charenton-le-Pont. In March, the STIF approved the boats' January design, by Franck Darnet Design. On 7 April, the operational base was in place, and the first experimental trip was made four days later, to test the wake. In May and June 2008, the piers and signage were put in place, and at the end of June a week's final trials ran without passengers before the service opened at the end of that month.

On Saturday, 28 June 2008 the boats entered service, with five stops between the Gare de Austerlitz and the École Vétérinaire de Maisons-Alfort (Paris Métro).

On the inauguration day, it got a resounding opening welcome from the public, with long queues at every pier waiting for the first boat, leaving at 4 p.m. Between the following Saturday (from 4 p.m.) to the Sunday (at 8 p.m.) it transported 1,923 passengers, roughly 30 per boat. Each month the passenger numbers were looked over and tweaks to the service made (travel times, connections, prices and so on), with questionnaires to the customers about comfort, tidiness, timeliness and so on. The STIF had guaranteed to have at least 800 available places per hour along the route, and agreed to standards of punctuality, especially during the morning rush hour.

This experiment, lasting two years and seven months until New Year's Eve of 2010, allowed evaluation of the likely customer demand, tweaks to the service timetables, and a more ambitious and frequent daily service during the following year.

During the first three months of the experiment, the Voguéo had 76,000 passengers, about a thousand a day, with plenty of room for them all, but only a punctuality rate of about 64%. Prices were reduced to €1 to drum up trade.

After about a year of the experiment, the Voguéo came under scrutiny as to its pricing and customer satisfaction: surveys showed a 95% satisfaction rate, and it was awarded a certificate of satisfaction from the French standards organisation AFNOR. All in all, the service was perhaps a little too infrequent and unreliable, especially during the winter, both commuters being put off by the wind and rain, and the boats themselves being slower and less comfortable.

== Route and piers ==
=== Route ===
Geographically accurate route

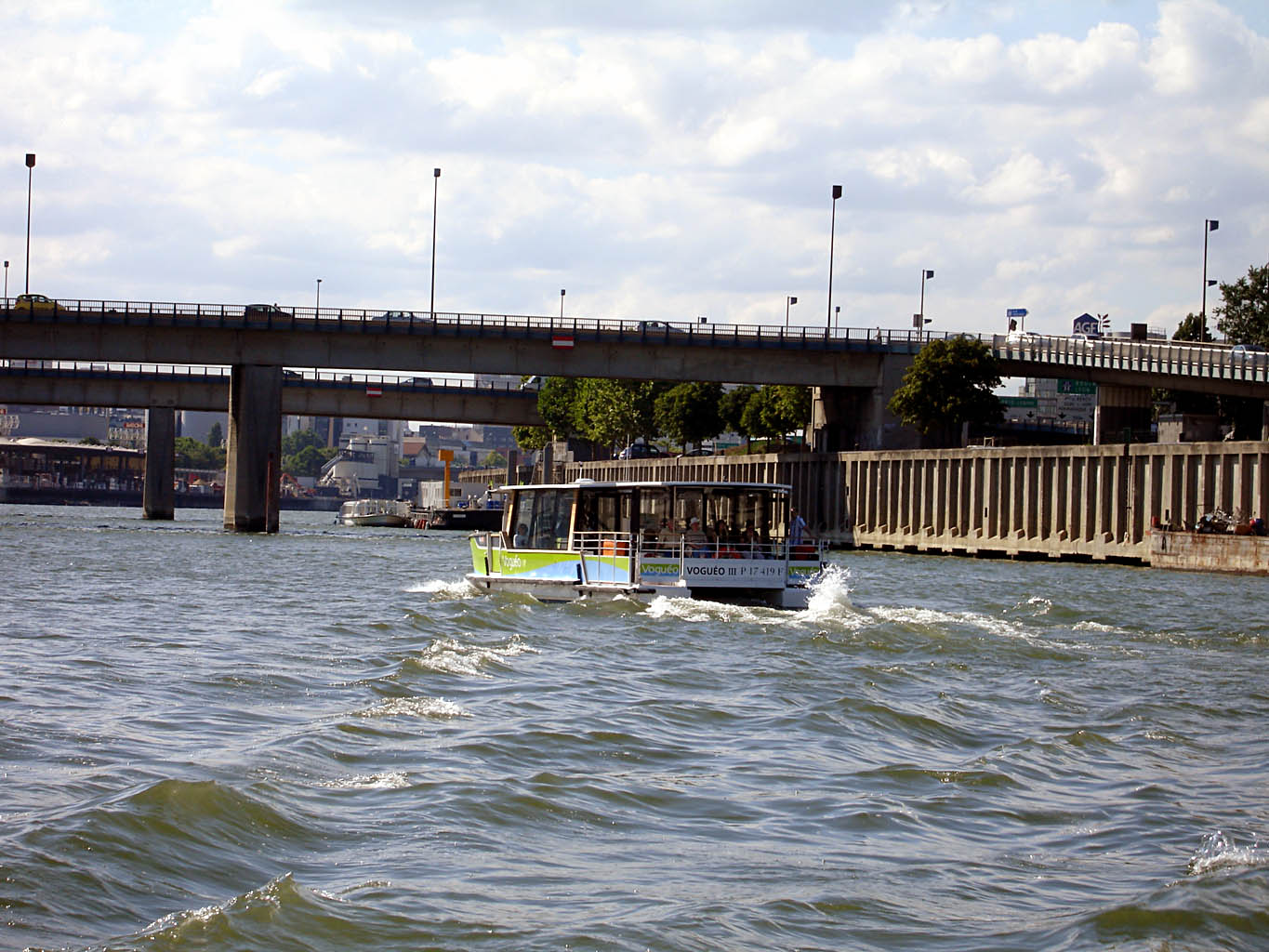
The Catamaran stops at the Nelson Mandela Bridges towards its Paris destination.

The Voguéo departed from the Quai d'Austerlitz on the left bank of the Seine, just upstream from the Pont Charles-de-Gaulle, taking a south-easterly course along the Seine. It passed beneath the Pont de Bercy which carries the Paris Métro Line 6, and then under the Passerelle Simone-de-Beauvoir, reaching its first stop at the Bibliothèque François Mitterrand near the Bibliothèque nationale de France within ten minutes.

Continuing its south-easterly route, the boat passed the Pont de Tolbiac, the Pont National, and the upstream bridge of the Boulevard Périphérique, leaving the city of Paris and entering the Val-de-Marne department. After 15 minutes of travel from its base, it reached the second stop at the twin Nelson Mandela Bridges which connect the communes of Ivry-sur-Seine and Charenton-le-Pont via the D154 autoroute. Passing the confluence of the Seine and Marne, Voguéo reached its terminus at the École vétérinaire de Maisons-Alfort in Charenton-le-Pont after a thirty-minute ride.

Going in the opposite direction, the boat stopped at the Parc de Bercy, on the right bank of the Seine, offering easy access to the BnF library. The ferry took thirteen minutes from Maisons-Alfort to Ivry - Pont Mandela, but took only ten minutes for the remaining leg, benefiting from the river's current.

=== Piers ===
Map of the route.

Starting at the northwest terminus, the line:

					Pier	Zone	Communes served	Interchange (Note: It is better to read the map with the interchanges with other public transit systems, to see how they interlink.)
		o			Gare d'Austerlitz	Zone 1	5th arr. 13th arr.	TER Centre; Main line trains
⇃			o		Parc de Bercy	Zone 1	12th arr.
	o			↾	Bibliothèque F. Mitterrand	Zone 1	13th arr.	Paris Metro Paris Metro Line 14 RER RER C
		o			Ivry Pont Mandela	Zone 2	Ivry-sur-Seine
		o			École Vétérinaire de Maisons-Alfort	Zone 3	Maisons-Alfort	Paris Metro Paris Metro Line 8

=== Pier facilities ===
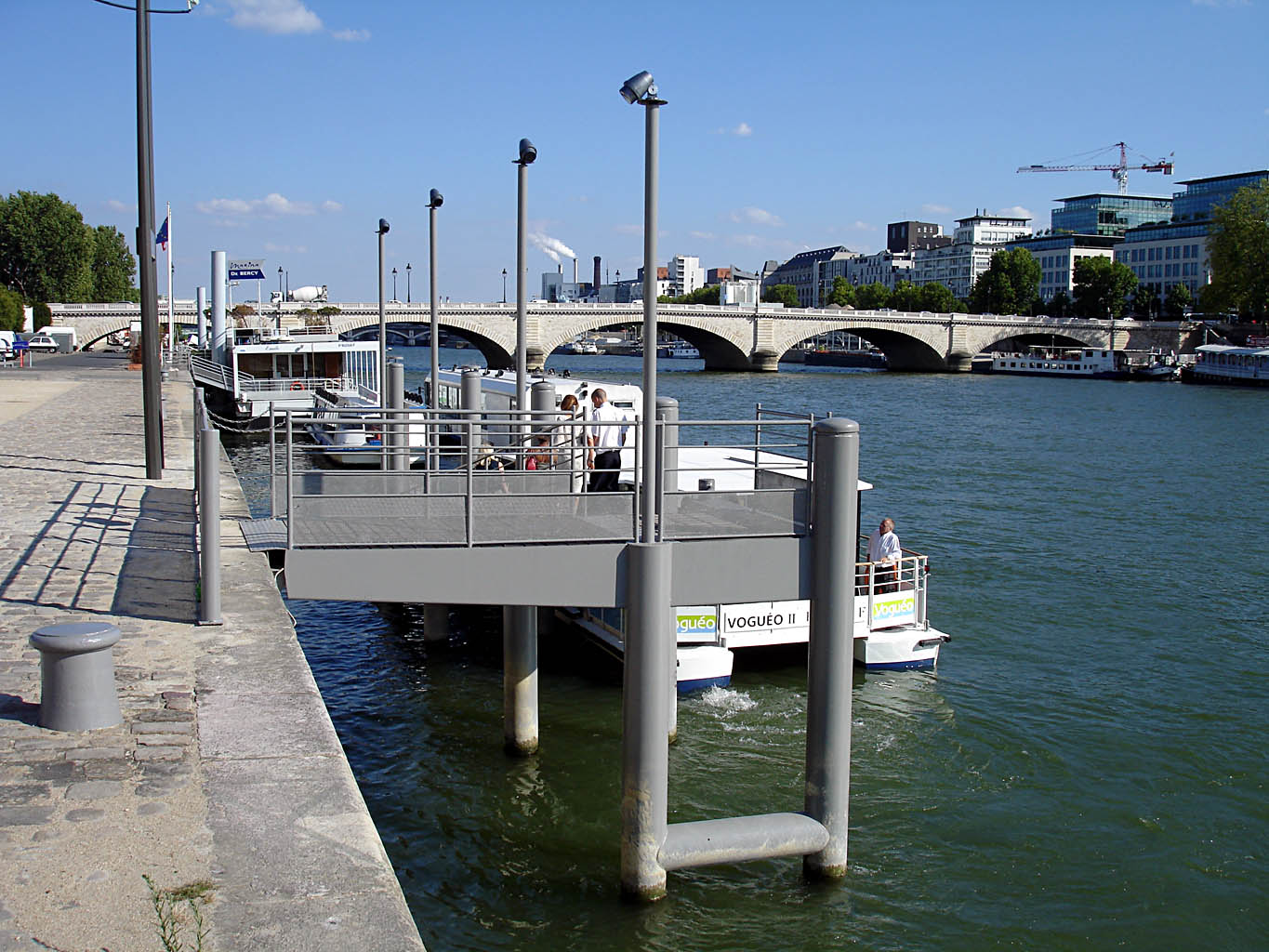
The embarkation pier at Bercy.

The piers were built by Abribus, and a signalling system was designed for their specific use.

Pier signage is lit, which serves both for passengers and to give the pilot notice of the headway. In the event of any failure, it lights in another colour to warn the pilot of the fault. The system gives the running times and waiting times for the next boat. These signs are not only at the piers but around and about.

== Use ==
=== Service ===
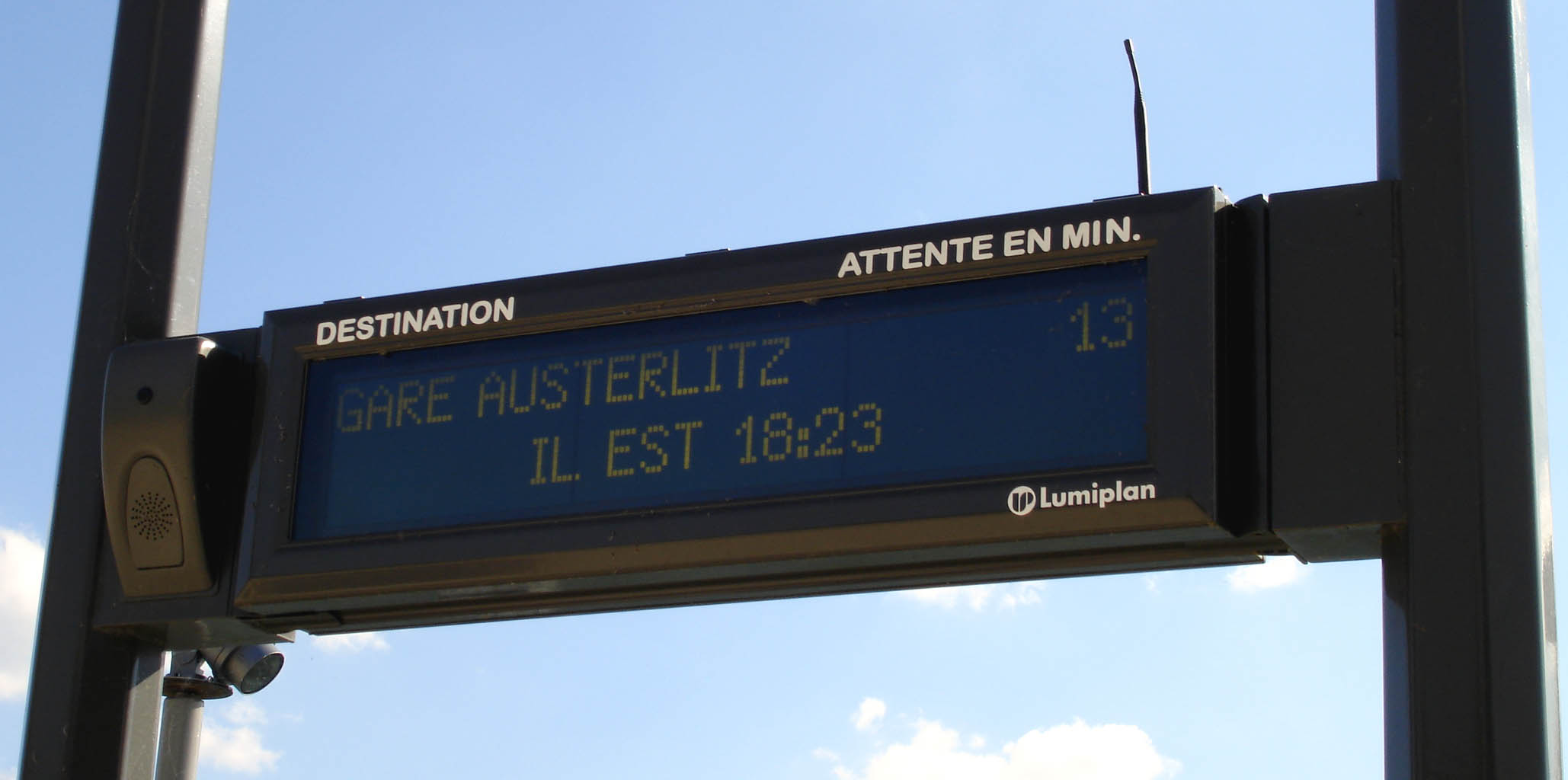
An illumintated sign announcing times, duration and destination, this one at the de Bercy pier.

During its experiment, the Voguéo ran every twenty minutes between 7 a.m. and 8.30 p.m., twenty-five minutes during off-peak daytimes, and half-hourly at the weekends.

In May 2009, after much tweaking with the timetables, the STIF decided to increase the frequency to 15 minutes during peak times and 20 minutes at other times, 30 during daytime weekends.

When it started, its time from start to finish (from Austerlitz to Maisons-Alfort) was 38 minutes one way and 33 the other, but after tweaking the timings, it came down to respectively 28 and 25 minutes, the difference mostly coming from the ferries not having to double-back at Maisons-Alfort.

But after all, the journey time was limited by the Rules of the River on the Paris Seine: 12 kilometres (7.5 mi) in Paris and 18 kilometres (11 mi) on its outskirts.

The chosen route went through the western Paris suburbs,, connecting with the RATP bus services 20–99 and Paris Métro lines 5, 8, 10 and 14, and also the suburban line RER C.

=== Infrastructure ===
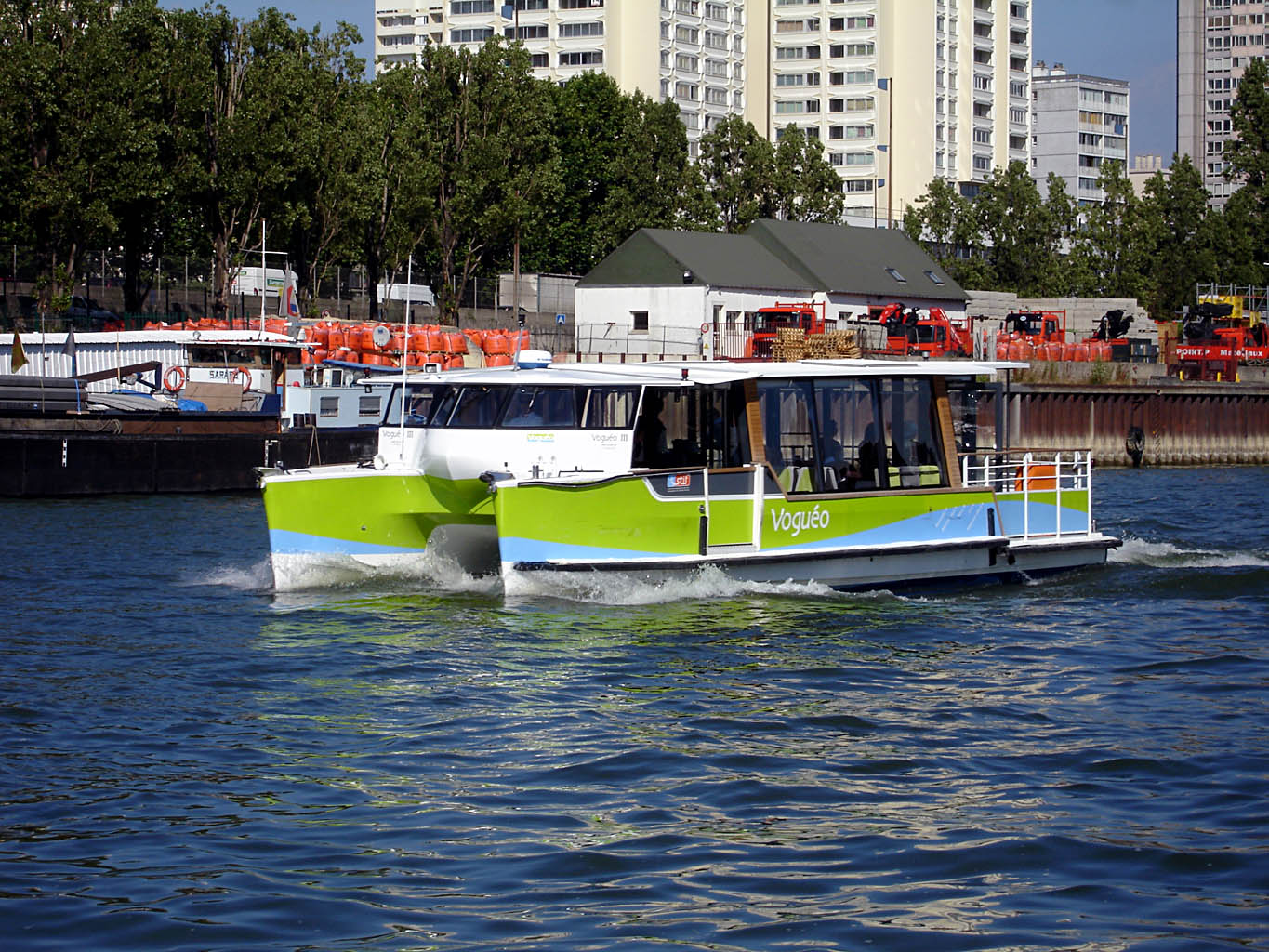
The catamaran Voguéo III at Charenton-le-Pont

The STIF ordered four catamarans to serve the route, designed by the Yacht Concept company, although they were delivered six months late. These were named Voguéo I, Voguéo II, Voguéo III, and Voguéo IV.

They were built at La Rochelle in the naval shipyards of Fountaine-Pajot, the world leader in ferry catamarans.

The boats kept to the IRIS 37 design, with modifications demanded by STIF, in particular enlargement of the bay windows, changes to the seating and the stern open back. The two naval architects Michel Joubert and Franck Darnet, designed these boats, being 12.30 by 5.20 m (40.4 by 17.1 ft) and sitting 1.20 m (47 in) in the water. These boats could take 75 personnel, 35 in each of the two aisles, the captain and his mate. The boats had doors under the covered, heated, bow station.

The boats were made from composite material so as not to rust, and had a displacement weight of 9.3 t (9.2 long tons; 10.3 short tons). They were powered by two 110 hp (82 kW) diesel engines, but were speed limited to 30 km/h (19 mph). At 2000 r.p.m. the engines would consume 7 L (1.5 imp gal; 1.8 US gal) an hour, and 13 L (2.9 imp gal; 3.4 US gal) at 2500 r.p.m. At 12 km/h (7.5 mph) they were noise rated to 65 dB, and at 18 km/h (11 mph) to 72 dB.

The first boat took its maiden voyage from the Charenton-le-Pont pier on 10 April 2008 for trials, and was due to enter full service on 1 June 2008, although this was postponed until 28 June 2008.

=== Facilities ===
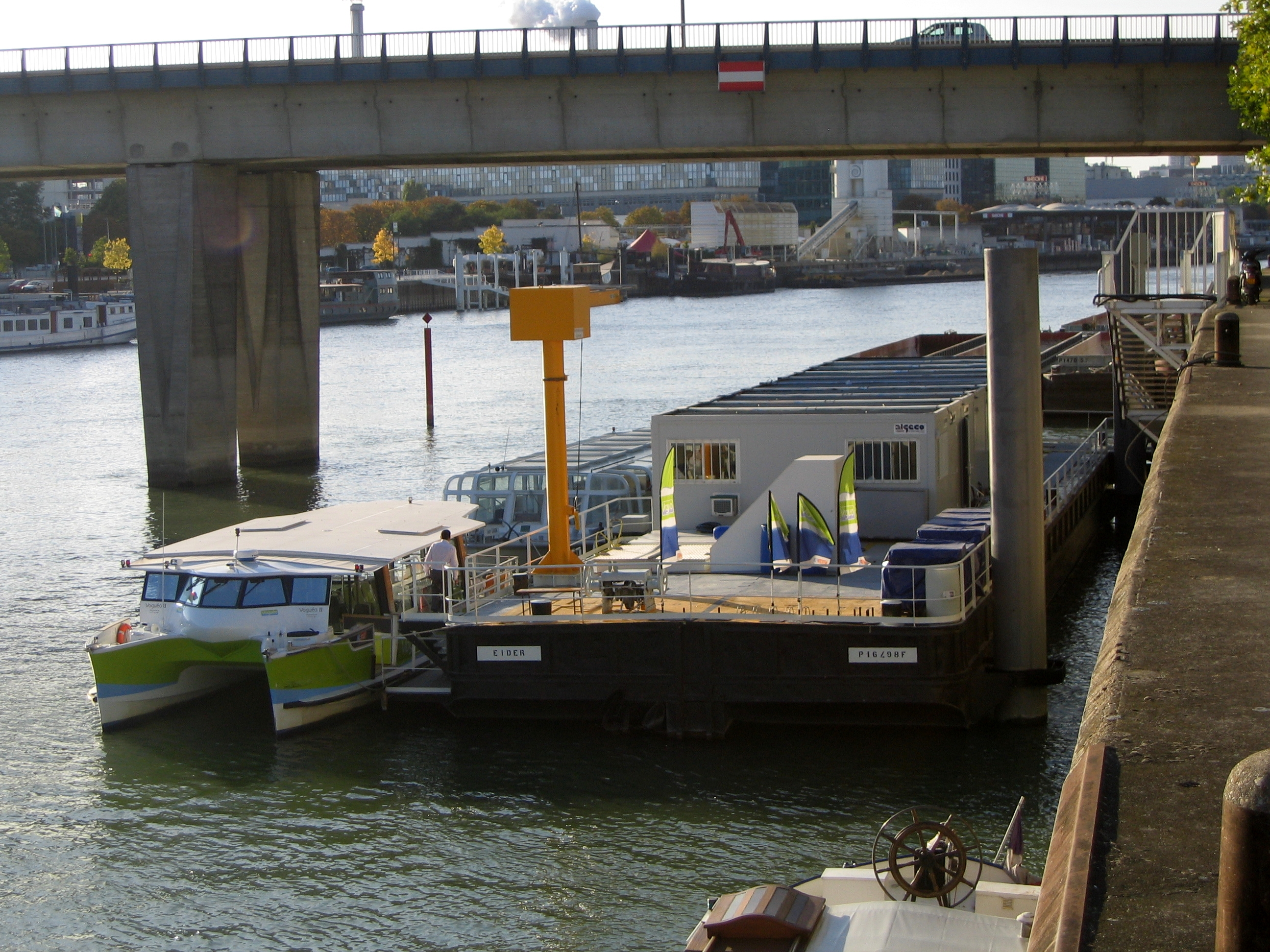
The service base at Charenton-le-Pont.

The fleet of four catamarans had their operational and maintenance base at Charenton-le-Pont, between the two Nelson Mandela Bridges. This depot also served as the command and control centre for the service.

=== Franchise ===
The service was franchised by the STIF to the Compagnie des Batobus ("Batobus") which in 2008 had 38 employees, 28 on the boats themselves and six at the operational base. The Voguéo recruited 14 pilots and 14 second mates; the pilots being seconded from the Batobus company, and the second mates recruited externally, from press ads. The teams were all put together between November 2007 and February 2008. The second mates looked after wake safety, cleanliness, customer information, and ticket sales. (Note: The second mates' monthly wage, on a fixed-term contract, was €1,677 per month according to www.parisjob.com on 23 May 2008)

=== Fares ===
Parisiens could use a wide variety of tickets valid for Paris zones 1, 2 and 3, including the Carte orange, the Carte Imagine'R, the Carte Améthyste and the Carte Solidarité Transport.

A single journey ticket cost €3 and could be purchased on board.

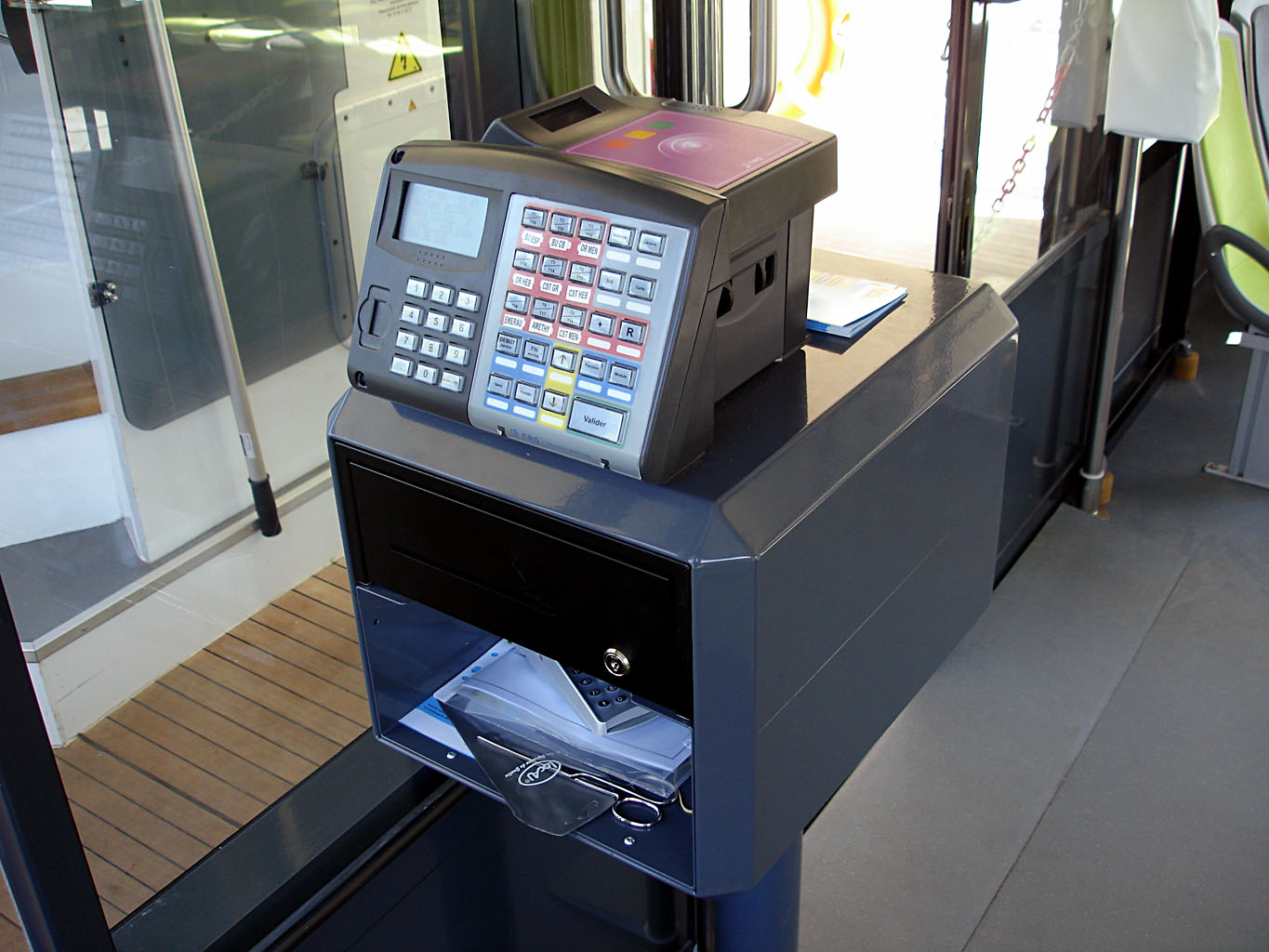
The second mate's ticket sales position on board

The fact that the terminus at Maisons-Alfort was in Zone 3 came under much criticism from regular commuters: the nearest Métro station was in Zone 2 and could be used on a standard ticket, whereas the Vogu$eo cost €3 a trip. This anomaly perhaps reduced the custom on the Voguéo.

All the same, the Voguéo paid its bills, and in June 2008, to make it more attractive, the STIF reduced ticket prices to €1 and made the Voguéo route into Zones 1 and 2 only.

All this cost €10.5m in investment, with a projected annual running cost of €4.6m before taxes. All of this was underwritten by the Compagnie des Batobus, but because the ticket prices were set by the STIF there as no way it could make a profit or cover its costs. The STIF paid the difference, to the Île-de-France regional council, and several other local bodies, who had set the terms and conditions for a cross-river ferry service, which it never really was designed to be.

== The future ==
The Voguéo experiment was deemed a success, but even before it had started extensions were proposed as far as Vitry-sur-Seine to the south and Suresnes to the west, with the Autorité de la concurrence making reports and requests to the STIF.

The Communauté d'agglomération Plaine-Commune also proposed another service, to run from Seine-Saint-Denis to La Défense (Hauts-de-Seine). The local council, on 28 January 2008, asked the STIF to start a study of the many different ways this may be possible, on the model of the Voguéo, between Suresnes and Clichy and the towns southwards of it, via La Défense. This new route would reduce the congestion on the Paris Métro Line 13.

== See also ==
- Syndicat des transports d'Île-de-France (STIF)
- Navibus, water taxis developed at Nantes
- Namourette, water taxis developed at Namur
- London River Services

== Sources ==
- Le Patrimoine de la RATP [Heritage of the RATP] (in French). Flohic. 1996. ISBN 2-84234-007-8.
- Gaillard, Marc (1991). Du Madeleine-Bastille à Meteor, histoire des transports parisiens [From Madeleine-Bastille to Meteor, a history of Paris transport] (in French). Martelle. ISBN 978-2-87890-013-2.
