= Boat tour =

Short tourist trip in a small boat

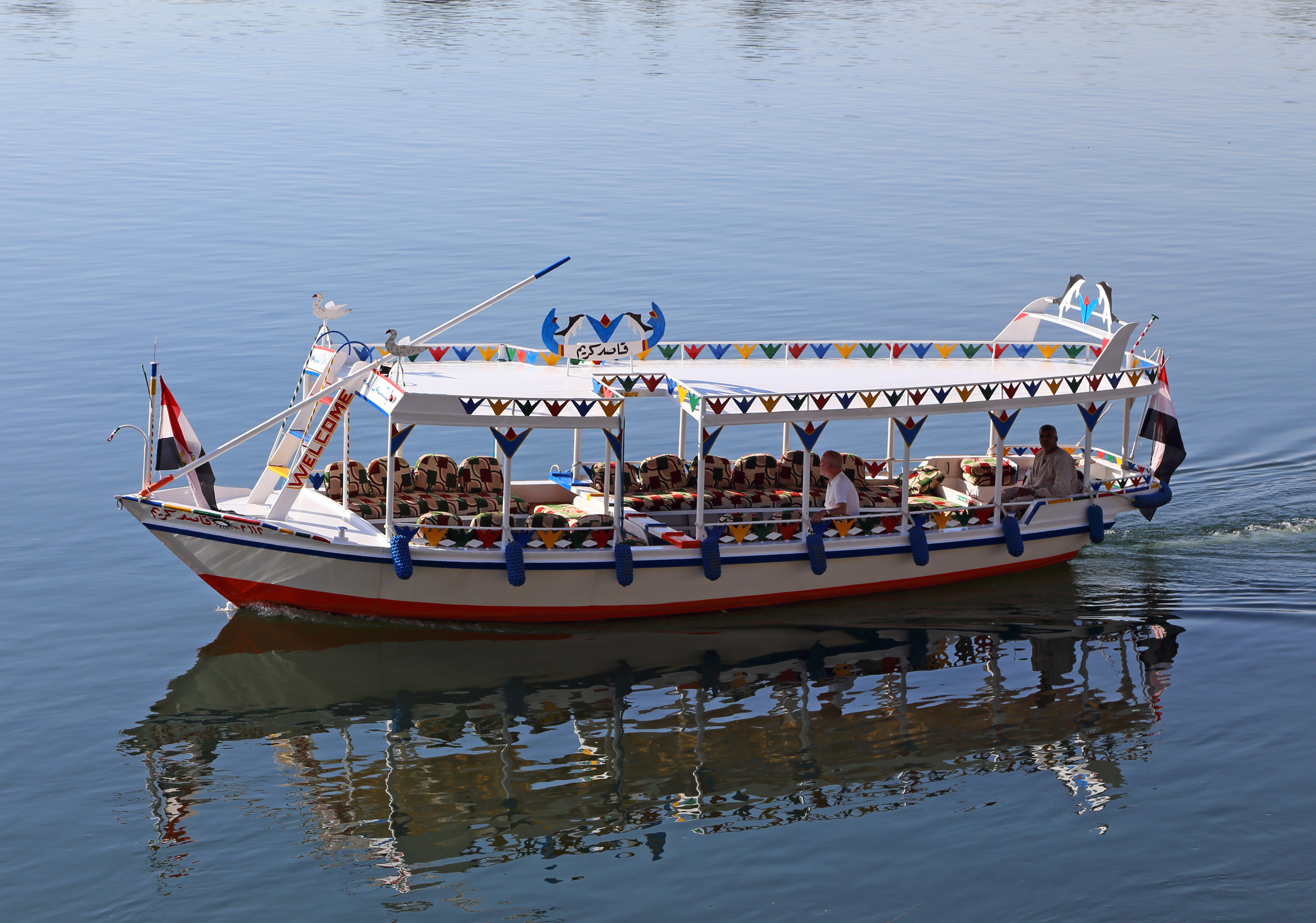
Boat tour on the River Nile near Luxor in Egypt

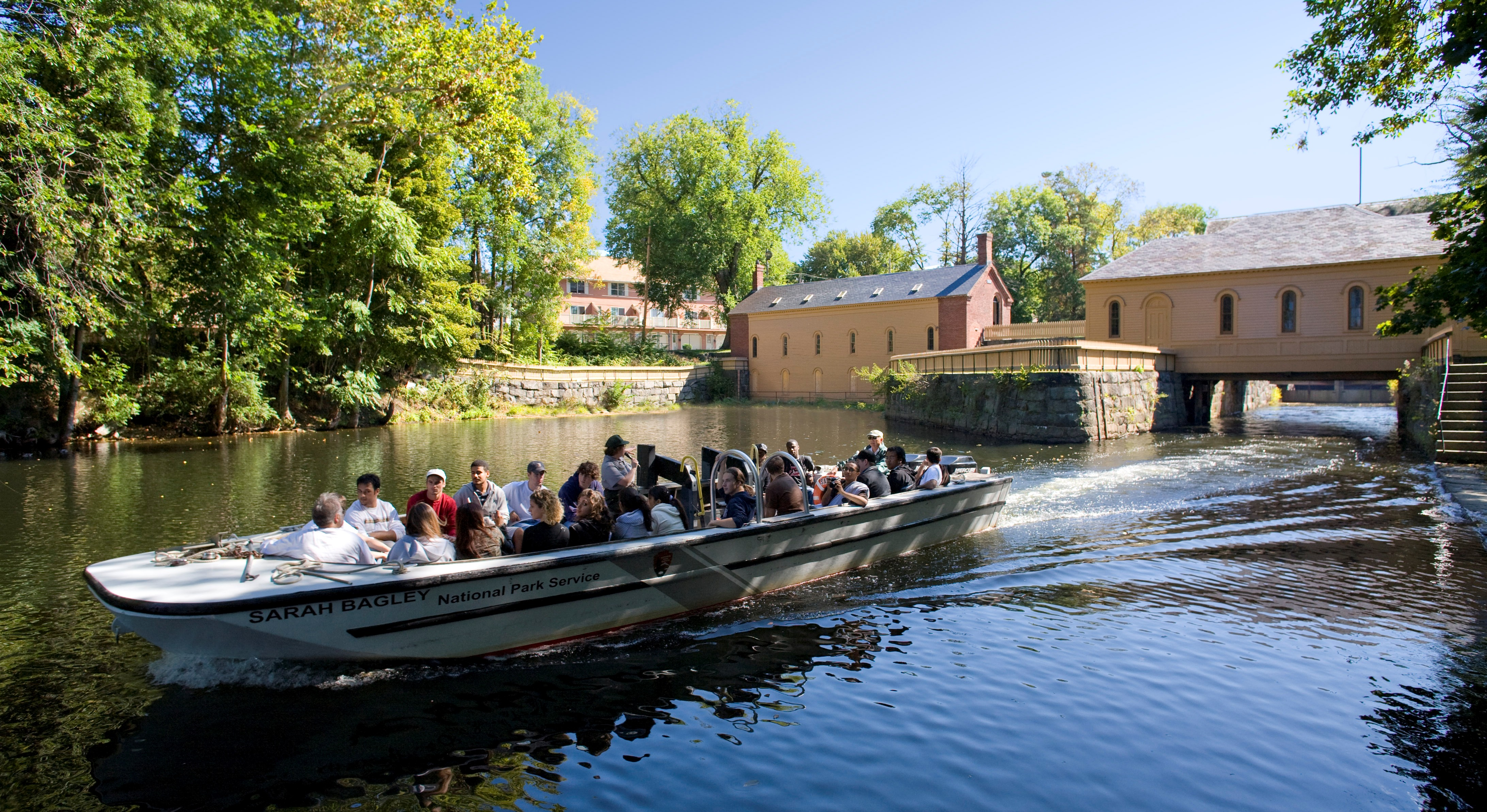
Lowell National Historical Park boat tour in the city of Lowell, Massachusetts, United States

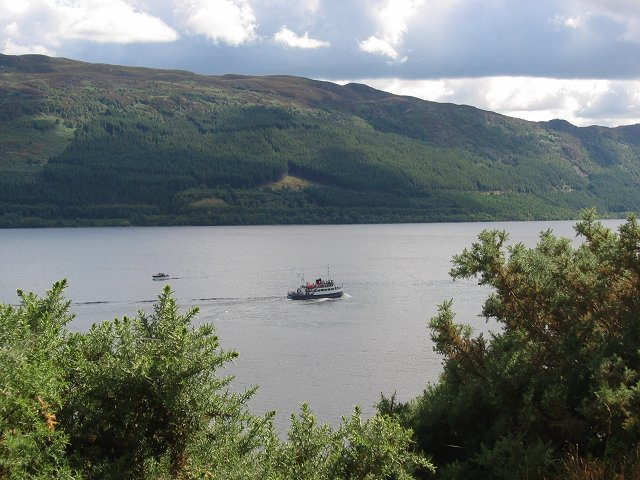
Boat tour on Loch Ness in Scotland

A boat tour is a short trip in a relatively small boat taken for touristic reasons, typically starting and ending in the same place, and normally of a duration less than a day. This contrasts with river cruising, yacht cruising, and ocean cruising, in larger boats or cruise ships, for any number of days, with accommodation in cabins.

For boat tours, usually a sightseeing boat is used, but sometimes adapted amphibious vehicles or purpose-built amphibious buses. Boat tours are often on rivers and lakes, but can be on canals as well. Sustainability is an increasing issue, since there can be an impact on the environment.

Boat tours also play a significant role in Emergency response and Military operations, moving beyond their purely leisure and sightseeing function.

== Examples ==
Example boat tours include:

- Bateaux Mouches on the River Seine in Paris, France
- Chao Phraya Express Boat on the Chao Phraya River in Thailand
- Jaws theme park boat tour, Florida, USA
- Maid of the Mist at the Niagara Falls, Canada/United States

== See also ==
- Cruising (maritime)
- Ethan Allen boating accident
- River cruise
- Tour boat
