= Dufour Yachts =

French sailboat manufacturer

- Founded: 1964 as Le Stratifié Industriel
- Founder: Michael Dufour
- Headquarters: La Rochelle, France
- Products: Sailboats
- Owner: Fountaine Pajot
- Number of employees: 420
- Website: www.dufour-yachts.com

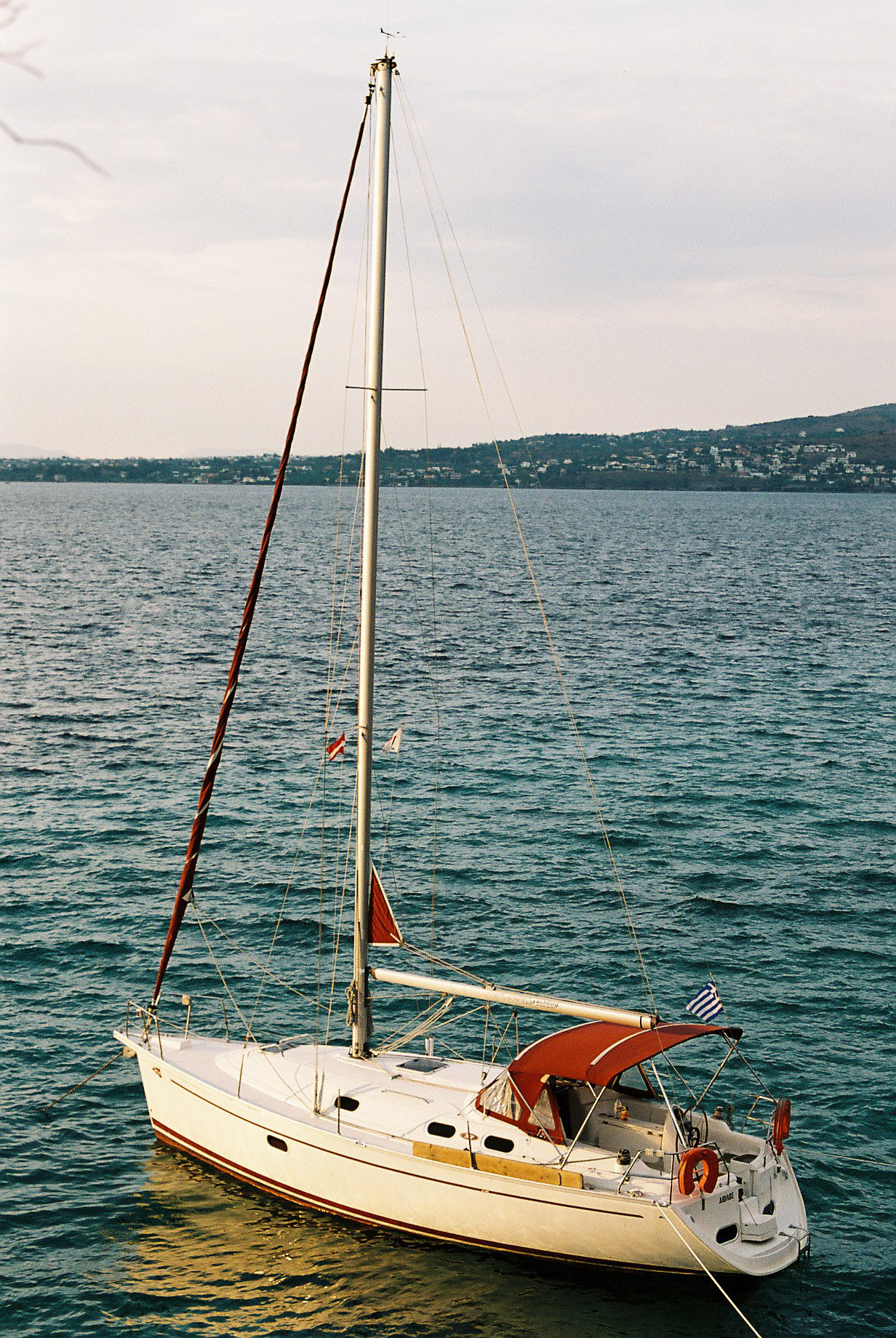
Dufour Gib'Sea 37

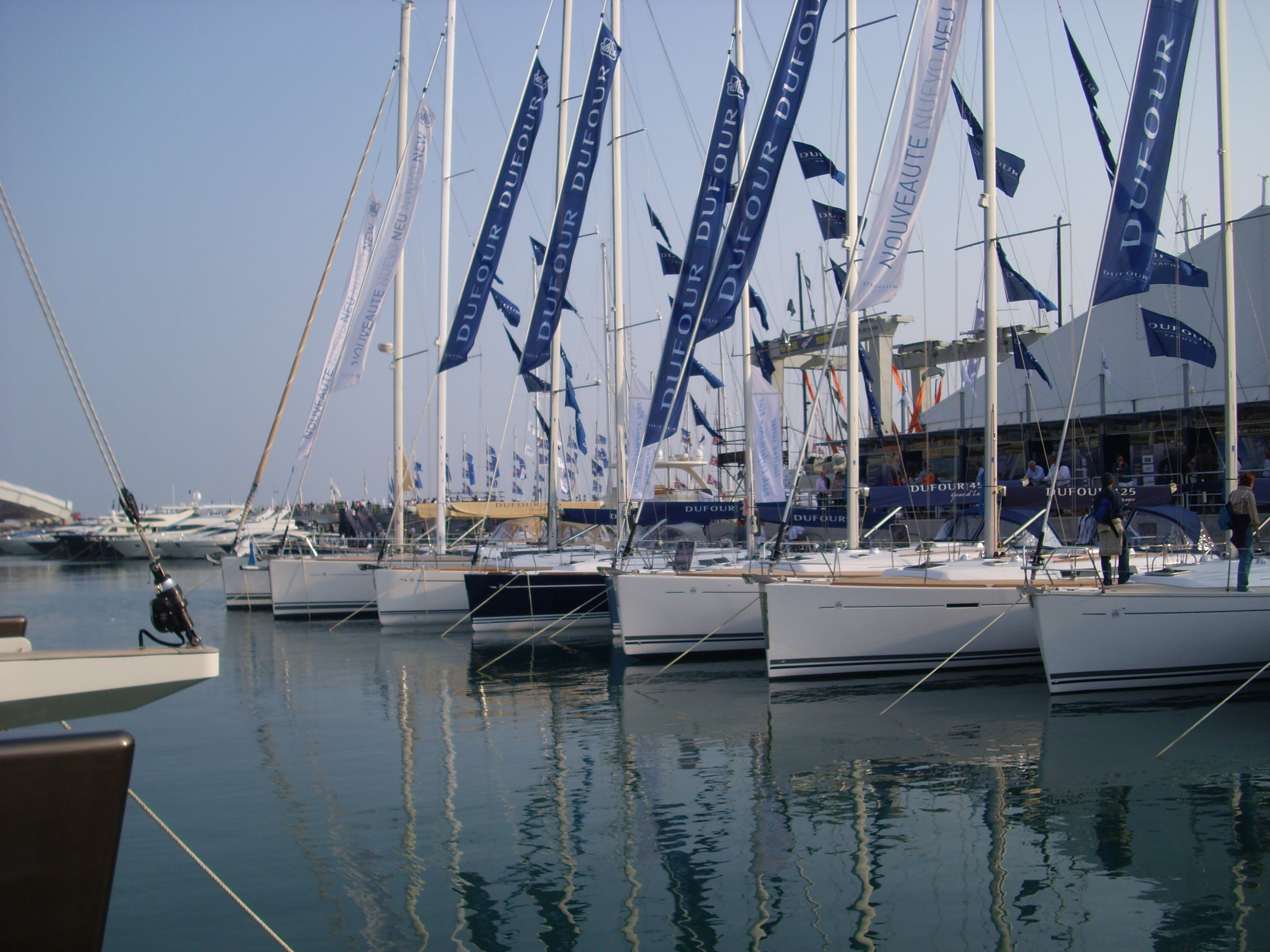
Dufour Yachts at the 2007 Genoa International Boat Show

Dufour Yachts is a French sailboat manufacturer which was founded in 1964 by naval architect and engineer Michel Dufour.

It was purchased by Fountaine Pajot in 2018, and Dufour remains a separate brand.

== Current models ==
From the list of models on Dufour Yachts's website, as of February 2021.

- Dufour 310
- Dufour 360
- Dufour 390
- Dufour 412
- Dufour 430
- Dufour 470
- Dufour 530
- Dufour 56
- Dufour 61

== Earlier models ==
- Dufour Arpège
- Dufour T6
- Dufour T7
- Dufour Sortilege 41
- Dufour Sylphe
- Dufour 1200
- Dufour 1800
- Dufour 2800
- Dufour 12000
- Dufour 3800
- Dufour 4800
- Dufour 24
- Dufour 25
- Dufour 27
- Dufour 29
- Dufour 31
- Dufour 34
- Dufour 35
- Dufour 34 Performance
- Dufour 39 German Frers
- Dufour 40e
- Dufour 44 Performance
- Dufour 45e
- Dufour Classic 30
- Dufour Classic 32
- Dufour Classic 35
- Dufour Classic 36
- Dufour Classic 38
- Dufour Classic 41
- Dufour Classic 43
- Dufour Classic 45
- Dufour Classic 50
- Dufour 40 Performance
- Dufour 34e
- Dufour 325 Grand Large
- Dufour 335 Grand Large
- Dufour 365 Grand Large
- Dufour 36 Performance
- Dufour 375 Grand Large
- Dufour 380 Grand Large
- Dufour 385 Grand Large
- Dufour 405 Grand Large
- Dufour 410 Grand Large
- Dufour 445 Grand Large
- Dufour 450 Grand Large
- Dufour 425 Grand Large
- Dufour 455 Grand Large
- Dufour 485 Grand Large
- Dufour 500 Grand Large
- Dufour 512 Grand Large
- Dufour 525 Grand Large
- Dufour 560 Grand Large
- Dufour 382 Grand Large
- Dufour 460 Grand Large
- Dufour 520 Grand Large
- Dufour 63 Exclusive
