= Fountaine-Pajot =

French maritime construction company

- Type: Limited Company
- Traded as: Euronext Growth
- Industry: construction of pleasure boats
- Founded: 1976
- Founder: Jean-François Fountaine; Marc Pajot
- Headquarters: Aigrefeuille-d'Aunis, France
- Products: Catamarans
- Revenue: 78,979,600 euro (2017)
- Net income: 6,323,700 euro (2017)
- Number of employees: 430
- Website: fountaine-pajot.com

Fountaine-Pajot is a major French maritime construction company specialising in pleasure craft. The company was founded in 1976 by Jean François Fountaine and Yves Pajot, in the town of Aigrefeuille-d'Aunis, in Charente-Maritime. It also now has a factory at La Rochelle.

== The Fountaine-Pajot business ==
Fountaine-Pajot has become a world renowned cruising catamaran manufacturer. The company started on an industrial estate in Aigrefeuille d'Aunis, and today is the town's largest employer, with some 250 employees; the group as a whole having about 430.

The company started to make public transport catamarans in 1983. Since then, the company has built 21 models and delivered 1,668 catamarans.

Nowadays the company makes between 150 and 180 catamarans a year, both sail and power craft.

In 2018, the company bought Dufour Yachts, a manufacturer of monohull sailing vessels.

== Innovation ==
Seeking to keep abreast of the competition, the company has a research and development department which aims to develop new processes and designs. Fountaine-Pajot developed a new process of making boat hulls by injection moulding.

Fontaine-Pajot made the catamarans for the experimental water taxi service along the River Seine, the Voguéo.

== Models ==
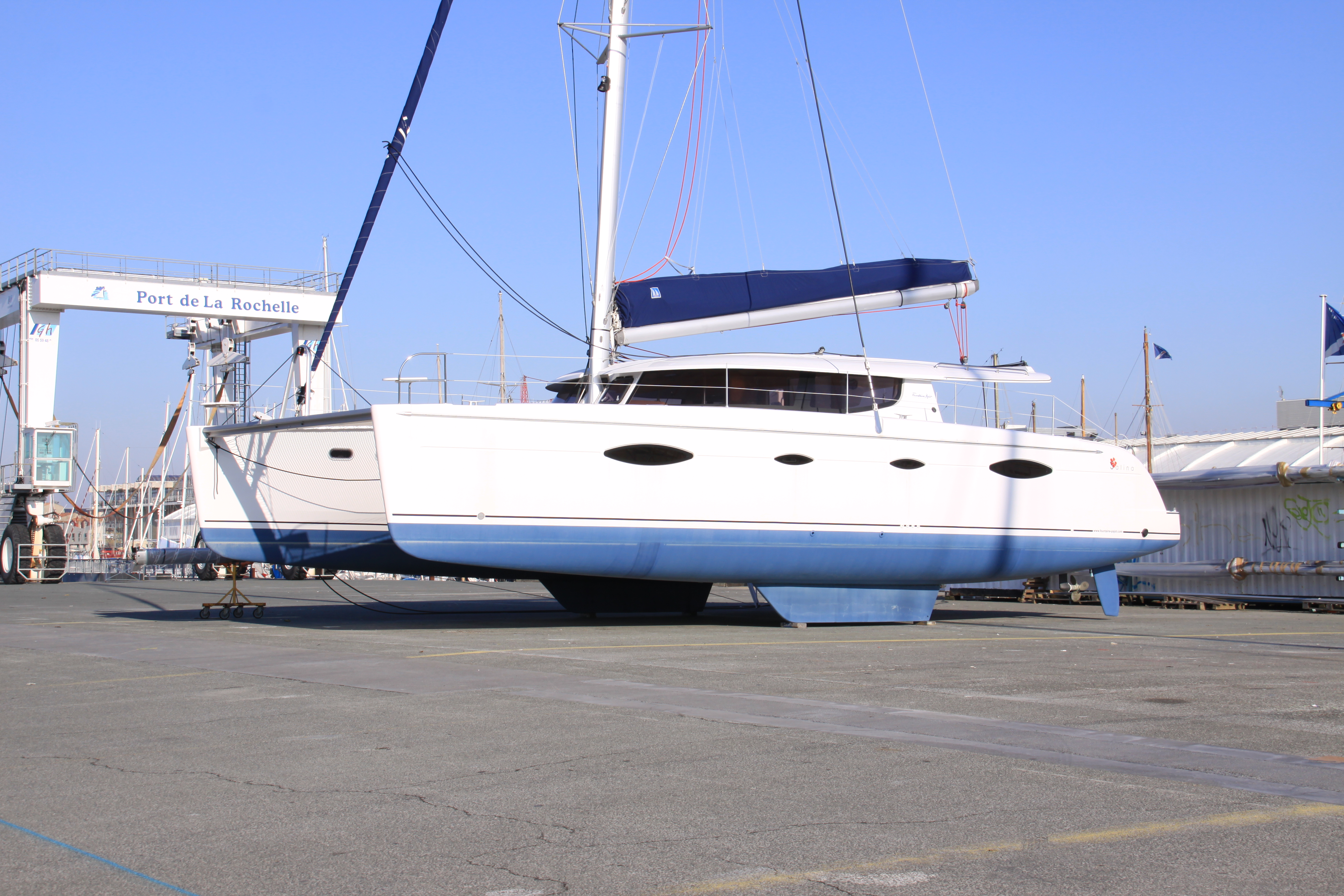
Salina 48

=== less than 40 feet ===
- Corneel 26 (1985)
- Maldives 32 (1988) (with pop-up saloon roof)
- Greenland 34 (1998) (motor yacht)
- Tobago 35 (1993)
- Highland 35 (2005) (motor yacht)
- Mahe 36 (2006)
- Louisiane 37 (1983)
- Antigua 37 (1990)
- Maryland 37 () (Yatch a moteur)
- MY37 37 () (Yatch à moteur)
- MY4.S 37 () (Yatch à moteur)
- Athena 38 (1994)
- Fidji 39 (1988)

=== 40 feet ===
- Casamance 43 (1985)
- Venezia 42 (1992)
- Bahia 46 (1997)
- Belize 43 (2000)
- Lavezzi 40 (2003)
- Cumberland 44 (2004) (motor yacht)
- Summerland 40 (2007) (motor yacht)
- Summerland 40 LC () (Yatch à moteur)
- MY40 40 () (Yatch à moteur)
- Lipari 41 (2009)
- Orana 44 (2007)
- Salina 48 (2010)
- Helia 44 (2012)
- Cumberland 47 (2013) (motor yacht)
- Lucia 40 (2016)
- Saona 47 (2017)
- Isla 40 (2020)
- Astrea 42
- Elba 45 (2020)
- Tanna 47 (2022)
- FP41 (2025)
- FP44 (2025)
- FP48 (2026)

=== 50 feet ===
- Marquises 53 (1991)
- Marquises 56 (1992)
- Queensland 55 (2010) (motor yacht)
- Sanya 57 (2010)
- Ipanema 58 (2014)
- Saba 50 (2015)
- FP51 (2026)
- FP55 (2026)

=== 60 feet or more ===
- Eleuthera 60 (2003)
- Galathea 65 (2008)
- Victoria 67 (2013)
- Taiti 80 (1996)
- Alegria 67 (2018)

== See also ==
- List of multihulls
- Aigrefeuille-d'Aunis
