= Dufour 24 =

1970s French recreational keelboat

Development
- Designer: Michel Dufour
- Location: France
- Year: 1975
- No. built: 720
- Builder: Dufour Yachts
- Name: Dufour 24

Boat
- Displacement: 3,000 lb (1,361 kg)
- Draft: 3.80 ft (1.16 m)

Hull
- Type: monohull
- Construction: fiberglass
- LOA: 24.10 ft (7.35 m)
- LWL: 19.58 ft (5.97 m)
- Beam: 8.20 ft (2.50 m)
- Engine: Volvo MD6A diesel engine or outboard motor

Hull appendages
- Keel: fin keel
- Ballast: 1,170 lb (531 kg)
- Rudder: transom-mounted rudder

Rig
- Rig type: Bermuda rig
- I foretriangle height: 25.30 ft (7.71 m)
- J foretriangle base: 8.40 ft (2.56 m)
- P mainsail luff: 23.60 ft (7.19 m)
- E mainsail foot: 9.20 ft (2.80 m)

Sails
- Sailplan: fractional rigged sloop
- Mainsail area: 108.56 sq ft (10.086 m^{2})
- Jib/genoa area: 106.26 sq ft (9.872 m^{2})
- Total sail area: 214.82 sq ft (19.957 m^{2})

Racing
- PHRF: 240

The Dufour 24 is a recreational keelboat built by Dufour Yachts in France from 1975 to 1979, with 720 boats completed.

Designed by Michel Dufour, the fiberglass hull has a raked stem, a nearly plumb transom, a transom-hung rudder controlled by a tiller and a fixed fin keel or optional shoal draft keel.

It has a fractional sloop rig.

The boat has a draft of 3.80 ft (1.16 m) with the standard keel and 2.42 ft (0.74 m) with the optional shoal draft keel.

The design has sleeping accommodation for four people, with a double "V"-berth in the bow cabin and two straight settee quarter berths in the main cabin. The galley is located on both sides of the companionway ladder and is equipped with a stove and a sink. There are no provisions for a head. The boat has no companionway hatch and instead has a raised domed entrance. Cabin headroom is 64 in (160 cm).

The design has a PHRF racing average handicap of 240 and a hull speed of 5.9 kn (10.9 km/h).
