= Alegria 67 =

Sailboat class

Development
- Designer: Berret-Racoupeau Yacht Design
- Location: France
- Year: 2018
- Builder: Fountaine-Pajot
- Role: Cruiser

Boat
- Displacement: 77,162 lb (35,000 kg)
- Draft: 5.58 ft (1.70 m)

Hull
- Type: catamaran
- Construction: fibreglass
- LOA: 66.80 ft (20.36 m)
- Beam: 32.28 ft (9.84 m)
- Engine: twin 110 hp (82 kW) diesel engines

Hull appendages
- Keel: skeg keel
- Ballast: none
- Rudder: twin internally-mounted spade-type rudders

Rig
- Rig type: Bermuda rig, with a staysail

Sails
- Sailplan: fractional rigged sloop
- Mainsail area: 1,399 sq ft (130.0 m^{2})
- Gennaker area: 1,076 sq ft (100.0 m^{2})
- Upwind sail area: 2,476 sq ft (230.0 m^{2})

The Alegria 67 is a French sailing catamaran that was designed by Berret-Racoupeau Yacht Design as a cruiser and first built in 2018.

== Production ==
The design is built by Fountaine-Pajot in France. First produced in 2018, it remains in production.

By 2019 more than 40 boats had been ordered by customers.

== Design ==
The Alegria 67 is a recreational sailboat, built predominantly of fibreglass, with wood trim. The hull is a vacuum infusion PVC polyester fibreglass sandwich, while the deck is a vacuum infusion balsa polyester fibreglass sandwich. It has a fractional sloop rig, with a staysail, a square-topped mainsail, aluminum spars, a deck-stepped mast, wire standing rigging and a two sets of swept spreaders. The twin hulls have reveres raked stems, reverse transoms, twin internally mounted spade-type rudders controlled by a dual wheels and a fixed skeg keels. It has a light displacement (empty weight) of 77,162 lb (35,000 kg) and carries no ballast.

The boat has a draft of 5.58 ft (1.70 m) with the standard skeg keels.

The boat is fitted with dual diesel engines of 110 hp (82 kW), or optionally 150 hp (112 kW), with bow thrusters for docking and manoeuvring. The fuel tank holds 317 U.S. gallons (1,200 L; 264 imp gal) and the fresh water tank has a capacity of 304 U.S. gallons (1,150 L; 253 imp gal).

The design has numerous possible layouts for private owner or charter use, which allow a maximum sleeping accommodation for 16 people in eight cabins with double berths, with one private head with a shower per cabin. The galley may be located on the main deck or below decks in place of one cabin. The design has a front deck, outdoor Jacuzzi and a flying bridge on the top level.

== Operational history ==
The design has won several awards, including Best Multihull Sailing Yacht in Asia at the Christofle Yacht Style Awards Ceremony in Thailand, organized by Yacht Style Magazine in January 2019; the 2019 Asia Boating Award and the Best Sailing Multihull at the Singapore Yacht Show in April 2019 and the Best Multihull of the Year 2019 in the 50 feet and over category at the International Multihull Boat Show in La Grande-Motte, France in April 2019.

In a March 2019 review for The International Yachting Media, Marco Pinetti noted the sailing qualities, ability to sail close to the wind, the ease of handling due to the electric winches, the hydraulically raised tender platform on the transom and the surprising inclusion of a Jacuzzi tub. In the sailing tests he noted that the jib required electrically roller furling to allow the boat to tack. He concluded that it is "a really extraordinary catamaran. Fast under sail and meticulously designed to fully enjoy the sea, she can only be considered as practically perfect.

A review in Katamarans praised the flying bridge on the top level but noted that it would create windage. It also noted that while the boat can be owner-sailed shorthanded, a professional crew would be the norm. The risk of significant depreciation on a new catamaran selling for €2M was also noted, stating "there are some very nice second hand boats out there for less money".

== See also ==
- List of sailing boat types
- List of multihulls
