= Batobus =

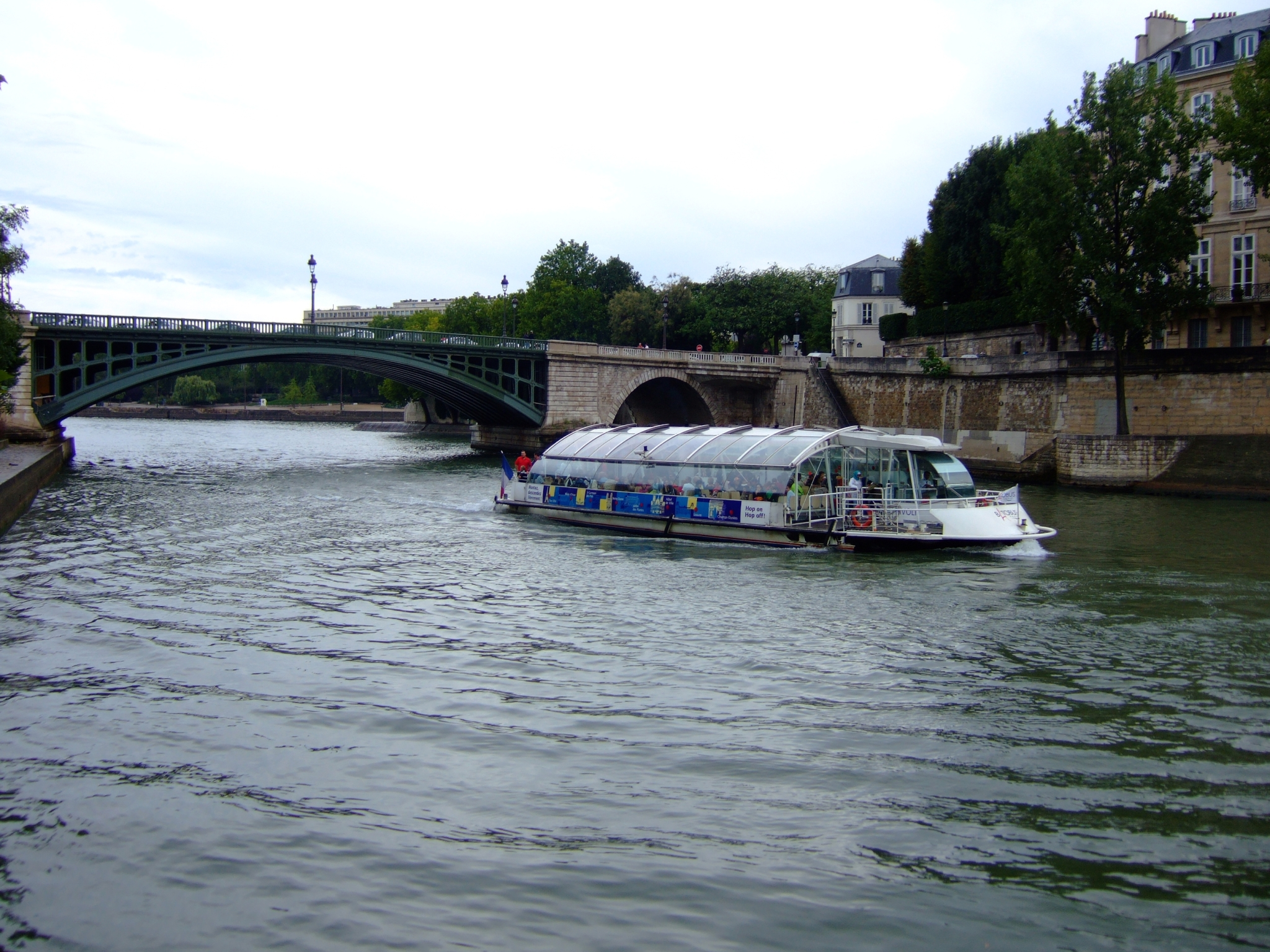
The batobus Rivoli, on its way past the Pont de Sully.

The Batobus is a boat service along the River Seine in the Paris region, with nine stops. The name is a trademark of Bateaux Parisiens. In 2006 –2007, it carried 843,000 passengers.

== History ==
The service was created by the Secretary of State for Transport in 1989, as part of the bicentennial celebrations of the French Revolution. The Paris Port Authority (Port autonome de Paris), took a biding monopoly contract. Between 1989 and 1996, the service had about 100,000 passengers annually.

In 1997, the contract was renewed for eleven years, for the tourist season, under the commercial name of "Batobus". Six stops were planned, four on the left bank of the Seine (the Rive Gauche), and two on the right bank (the Rive Droite). In the end two more were added, at the Jardin des Plantes and the Eiffel Tower. In 2001–2002, it had as many as 500,000 passengers.

In 2005, after being steadily extended, the service came to run throughout the year. In 2007, the Syndicat des transports d'Île-de-France (STIF) bid to run the service, which Batobus won, to create a regular river boat service along the Seine. This service, named Voguéo, was tried out for thirty-one months, from 1 June 2008 to 31 December 2010.

== Service ==
The Batobus serves the following stops: Beaugrenelle/Île aux Cygnes, Eiffel Tower, Musée d'Orsay, Saint-Germain-des-Prés, Notre-Dame, Jardin des Plantes, Hôtel de Ville, Louvre, and Champs-Élysées.

The service runs from 10.30 a.m. until 16.30 p.m. from November to March (5 p.m. during the Christmas holidays) and from 10 a.m. to 7 p.m. from March to November. In July and August, the service was extended in the evenings until 9.30 p.m. In high season, the frequency was increased from 30 to 15 minutes.

The service has eight boats, running at 6 nautical miles per hour (11 km/h; 6.9 mph) at their fastest, the top speed being limited by the River Authority. Six trimarans, with two engines fore and aft, allowed 360° turns, essential to such a service. Boats could carry up to 200 passengers and a dozen bicycles. The boats had an open back, with space for bikes at the front. They had the names Vendôme, Odéon, Rivoli, Trocadéro, Bastille and Dauphine. The Dauphine was launched in July 2005. Two other river boats, with the carrying capacity of 150 passengers, were launched soon after, to complete the fleet.

The Batobus is a commercial service subject to commercial risk, but with controlled fares. Various fare formulae were proposed, for one-day, two-day or five-day tickets. In 2009, the fares changed from €12 to €17 regardless of how many days, with half price for children under sixteen. Even with the introduction of the Voguéo, the Batobus refused to directly accept the common Paris travel tickets or the Passe Navigo, but gave discounts for those holding most of the common Paris tickets on the Navigo card (the Intégrale, the Imagine'R, the Émeraude and Améthyste and so on) and for students. In 2009, there was also an annual €55 season ticket, €35 for children under sixteen.

Traffic continued to increase; 914,084 tickets were sold in 2007 –2008, for 1.6 million journeys (some tickets being used for more than one journey). Most passengers on the Batobus were tourists: passengers living in Paris got a reduced fare, but it was estimated this made up no more than 5% of the total traffic.

== Notes and references ==
=== See also ===
- Voguéo

=== Sources ===
- Le Patrimoine de la RATP. Flohic. 1996. ISBN 2-84234-007-8.
- Gaillard, Marc (1991). Du Madeleine-Bastille à Meteor, histoire des transports parisiens. Martelle.
