= Dufour 1800 =

Sailboat class

Development
- Designer: Laurent Cordelle and Michel Dufour
- Location: France
- Year: 1979
- No. built: about 200
- Builder: Dufour Yachts
- Name: Dufour 1800

Boat
- Displacement: 3,969 lb (1,800 kg)
- Draft: 4.25 ft (1.30 m) (fin keel)

Hull
- Type: Monohull
- Construction: Fiberglass
- LOA: 25.10 ft (7.65 m)
- LWL: 21.92 ft (6.68 m)
- Beam: 8.89 ft (2.71 m)
- Engine: Volvo Penta MD5A diesel engine 8 hp (6 kW)

Hull appendages
- Keel: fin keel
- Ballast: 1,653 lb (750 kg)
- Rudder: internally-mounted spade-type rudder

Rig
- Rig type: Bermuda rig
- I foretriangle height: 27.50 ft (8.38 m)
- J foretriangle base: 8.42 ft (2.57 m)
- P mainsail luff: 27.90 ft (8.50 m)
- E mainsail foot: 9.80 ft (2.99 m)

Sails
- Sailplan: Fractional rigged sloop
- Mainsail area: 136.71 sq ft (12.701 m^{2})
- Jib/genoa area: 115.78 sq ft (10.756 m^{2})
- Total sail area: 252.49 sq ft (23.457 m^{2})

Racing
- PHRF: 219 (average)

The Dufour 1800 is a French sailboat that was designed by Laurent Cordelle and Michel Dufour as a trailerable cruiser-racer and first built in 1979.

The Dufour 1800 is a development of the earlier Dufour 25.

The unusual designation does not indicate the boat length in imperial or metric, as is common, but instead the metric displacement of 1,800 kg (3,968 lb).

== Production ==
The design was built by Dufour Yachts in France between 1979 and 1982. About 200 examples were completed by the time production ended.

== Design ==
The Dufour 1800 is a recreational keelboat, built predominantly of fiberglass, with wood trim. It has a fractional sloop rig, aluminum spars, a raked stem, a reverse transom, an internally mounted spade-type rudder controlled by a tiller with an extension and a fixed fin keel or optional lifting keel. The fixed keel was supplied in three sizes: shallow draft, standard draft, and deep draft. The standard draft fin keel version displaces 3,969 lb (1,800 kg) and carries 1,653 lb (750 kg) of ballast.

The boat has a draft of 4.25 ft (1.30 m) with the standard draft fin keel.

The boat is fitted with a Swedish Volvo Penta MD5A diesel engine of 8 hp (6 kW) or an outboard motor in a well. The fuel tank holds 6 U.S. gallons (23 L; 5.0 imp gal) and the fresh water tank has a capacity of 25.1 U.S. gallons (95 L; 20.9 imp gal).

Accommodations include a forward "V"-berth with an opening hatch for ventilation and two cabin berths. The starboard berth foot is under the navigation table. The galley has a two-burner stove and a dinette table that can be stowed under the starboard cabin berth or can be moved to the cockpit for use. The head is located on both sides of the bow, just aft of the "V"-berth and includes a chemical toilet and a sink. A marine toilet was a factory option.

A single winch is mounted on the cabin roof for the halyards and two additional jib winches are mounted on the cockpit coaming. There is a mainsheet traveller and tracks for the jib blocks. A boom vang and adjustable backstay were standard equipment.

The design has a PHRF racing average handicap of 219 and a hull speed of 6.27 kn (11.61 km/h).

== Operational history ==
A used boat review in Yachting Monthly in 2009 described the design, "She is typical of the middle years of Dufour design: a full-bodied, high-volume hull topped by a square-looking coachroof ... The saloon feels a bit cramped, but the galley is adequate for extended cruising. A well-proportioned fractional rig gives sporty performance, and given a crisp, well-cut suit of sails, she makes a good entry-level club racer."

In a 2010 review Steve Henkel wrote, "the 1800, which sold mostly in Europe but developed a following in Canada and to some extent in the United States, came with a choice of standard keel ... deep keel, shallow keel, or lifting keel. An outboard well, in the cockpit on the boat’s centerline just forward of the rudder, provides good steering control under power. An inboard was also available. Best features: The cabin table, which when not in use is stored beneath the starboard berth, is unusually clever in that it mounts in any of three different positions: (1) fore and aft attached to the main bulkhead; (2) athwartships attached to the seat backs on either side; or (3) in the cockpit, mounted on the bottom washboard. Down below, a half-size chart table to port, supported by the rear bulkhead, is also handy. Worst features: None noted."

== See also ==
- List of sailing boat types
