= Carte Améthyste =

Parisian discount travel card for citizens

The Améthyste Ticket is a travel pass for elderly and disabled people (aged over 20). It provides unlimited public transport in Paris and Île-de-France on all services provided by the RATP (the regional public transport authority) and the SNCF (the state-owned national railway operator). It is valid for 1 year from the date of issue, and can be renewed.

== Eligibility ==
The Améthyste Ticket is provided to:

- Those over 65 years of age, or 60 who are recognised as unfit for work
- Those over 20 years of age who are assessed as being more than 80% disabled
- War veterans and their widows over 65 years of age
- Those deported or, interned or placed in concentration camps during the Second World War, and their French dependents over 60 years of age, subject to a means test
- Those that served in reserved occupations, and their widows, without being subject to a means test.
