= Nelson Mandela Bridges =

Bridges in France

Coordinates: 48°49′13″N 2°23′58″E

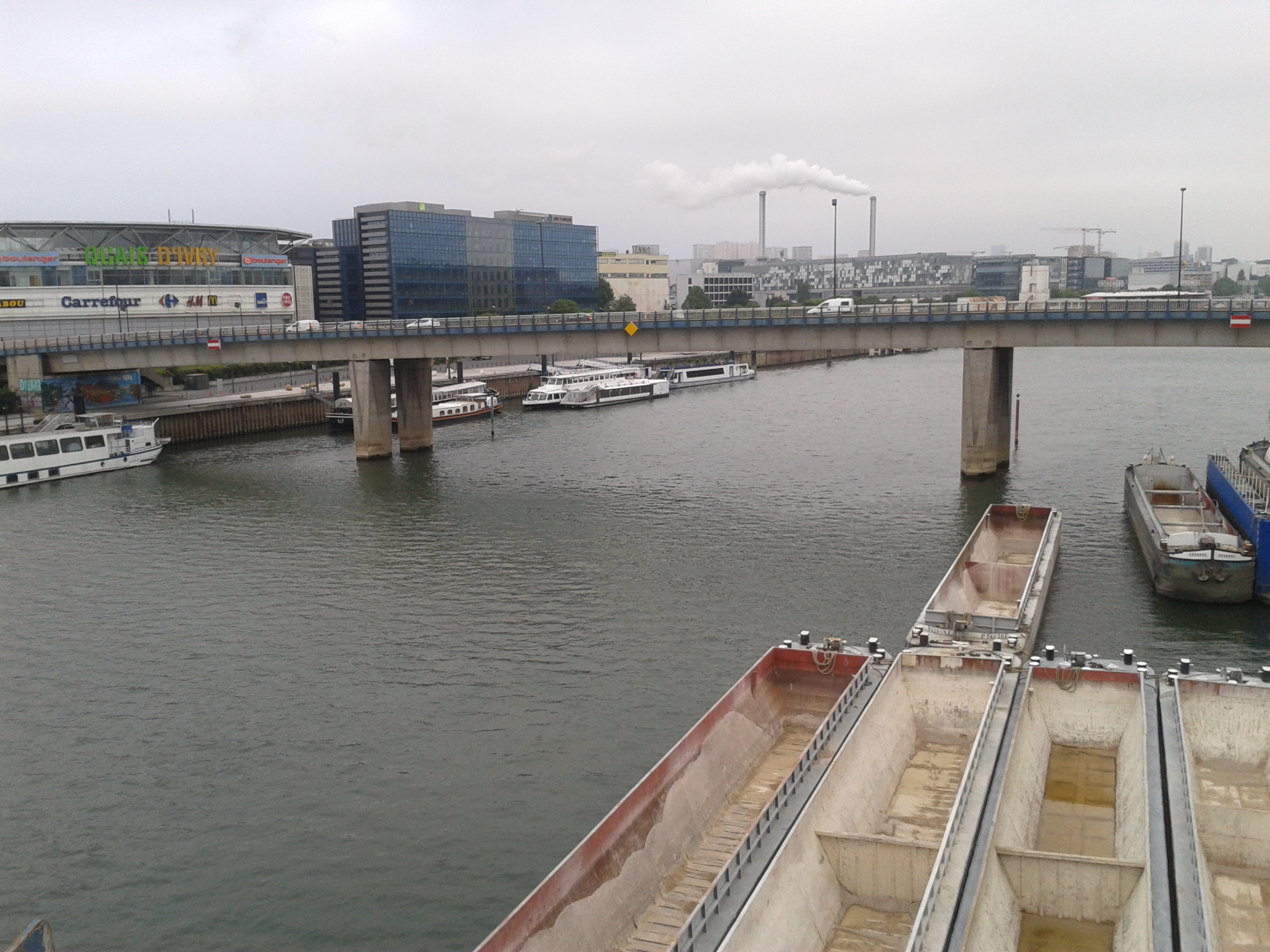
One of the Nelson Mandela Bridges in Charenton-le-Pont, Paris.

The Nelson Mandela Bridges (French: Ponts Nelson-Mandela) are two twin bridges in France, spanning the river Seine, between Ivry-sur-Seine and Charenton-le-Pont, where the Seine and the Marne have their confluence. Initially they were both called the "pont de Conflans" ("Confluence Bridge"), but were renamed for Nelson Mandela, the first democratically elected President of South Africa. They now form part of the D103 and the A4 autoroute.
