= Bateaux Mouches =

Open excursion boats operating on the river Seine in Paris, France

Coordinates: 48°51′50″N 2°18′21″E

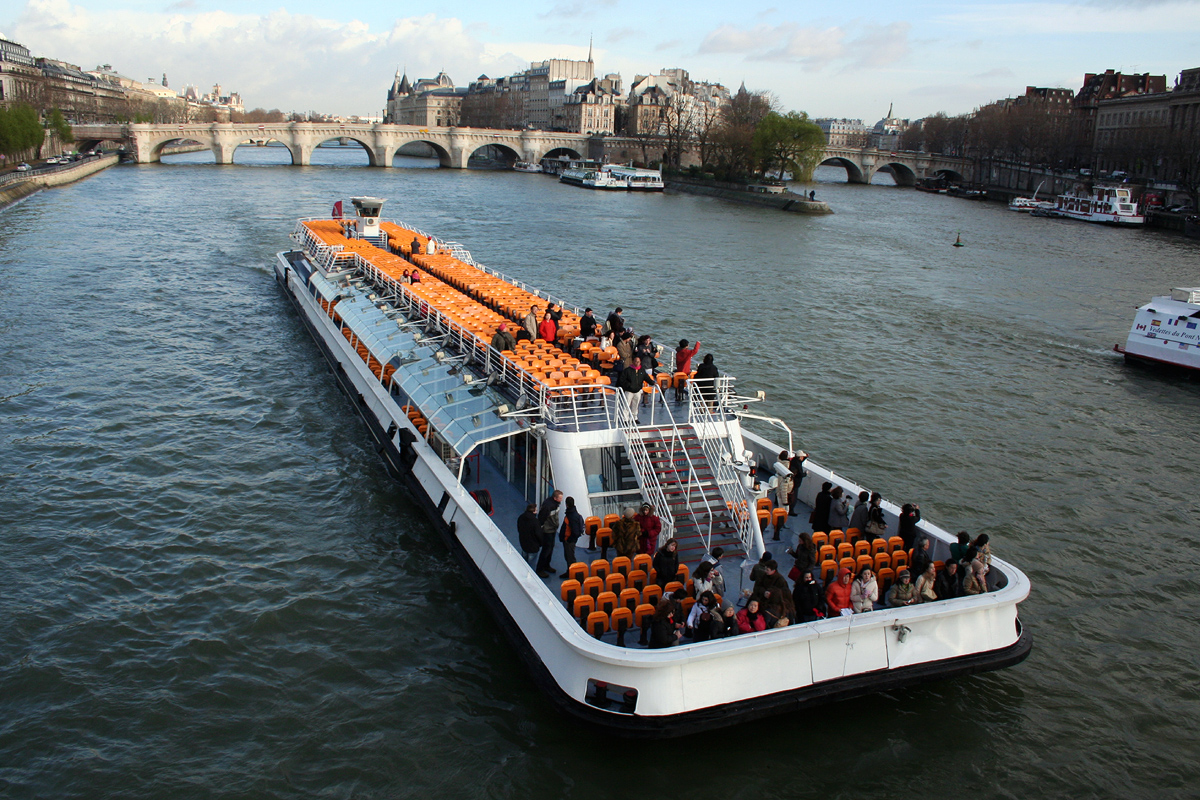
A Bateau Mouche on the Seine near Pont Neuf

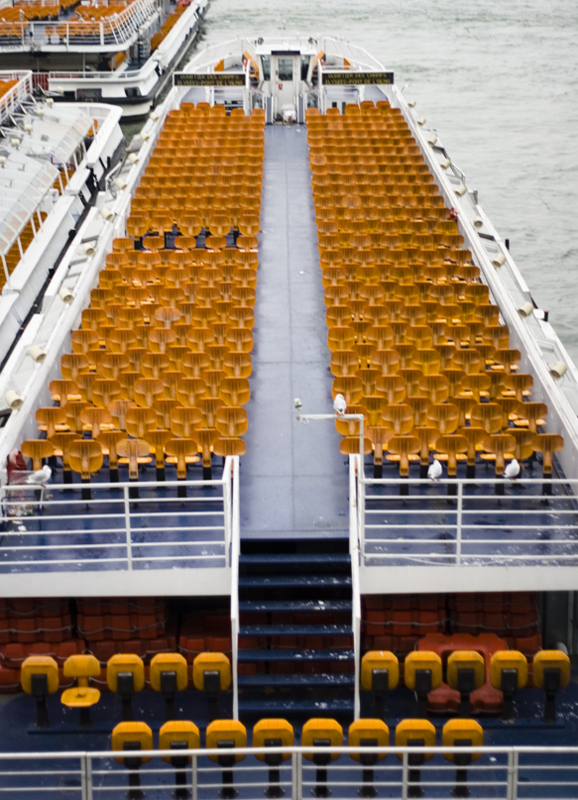
Bateau Mouche seats

Bateaux Mouches (French pronunciation: [bato muʃ]) are open, long, and often glass-covered excursion boats that provide visitors to Paris with a view of the center of the city from along the river Seine. They also operate on Parisian canals such as Canal Saint-Martin, which is partially subterranean.

== Trademark and history ==
The term Bateaux Mouches is a registered trademark of the Compagnie des Bateaux Mouches, a Paris-based sightseeing operator, founded by Jean Bruel (1917–2003); The phrase is also used generically to refer to sightseeing operating boats on the Seine in Paris. Bateaux Mouches translates literally as "fly boats" ("fly" meaning the insect); however, the name arose because they were originally manufactured in boatyards situated in the Mouche area of Lyon. They started with steamers at an Exhibition in 1867, but the Steamers stopped running in the slow down of the Great Depression.

The modern boats are popular tourist attractions in Paris. Boats often have an open upper deck and an enclosed lower deck; some have sliding canopies that can close to protect the open deck during inclement weather. Boats can accommodate up to 1000 passengers each. Most boat tours include a live or recorded commentary on the sights along the river. A typical cruise lasts about one hour. Many companies offer lunch and dinner cruises as well. Most boats are equipped with lights to illuminate landmarks in the evening.

Since the Seine is centrally situated in Paris, a boat tour covers a great deal of the city. Both the Left Bank (Rive Gauche) and the Right Bank (Rive Droite) are visible from the boat. Passengers can see, among other sites, the Eiffel Tower; Notre-Dame Cathedral; the Alexander III Bridge, the Pont Neuf; the Orsay Museum, and the Louvre Museum. Passengers can also see Les Invalides, Napoleon's burial site.

Boat tours in Paris have flourished since World War II, and today the Compagnie des Bateaux Mouches (still the oldest company operating boat tours) has significant competition. On busy days during high season, boats constantly move up and down the river.

The city also used the boats to ferry athletes during the 2024 Summer Olympics' opening ceremony's Parade of Nations down the Seine – the first Parade of Nations to not be held in a stadium.

== In Canada ==
A Canadian company runs a tour of the Saint Lawrence River around Montreal using a distinct type of tour boat, which is called the "Bateau-Mouche of the Old Port of Montréal".

In Kingston, Ontario, Canada, Kingston 1000 Island Cruises operates "Le Bateau Mouche II" for lunch and dinner cruises of the 1000 Islands, sailing a vessel referred to unofficially as the "Island Star".
