= Timeline of Paris =

Coordinates: 48°51′24″N 2°21′07″E

The following is a timeline of the history of the city of Paris, France.

== The Parisii and the Roman Lutetia ==
- 250-225 BCE
  - The Parisii, a Celtic tribe, found a town, called Lucotecia, on the Île de la Cité.
- 53 BCE
  - Julius Caesar addresses an assembly of leaders of the Gauls in Lucotecia, asking for their support.
- 52 BCE
  - The Parisii are defeated by the Roman general Titus Labienus at the Battle of Lutetia. A Gallo-Roman garrison town, called Lutetia, is founded on the left bank of the Seine.
- Between 14 and 37 CE
  - The sailors of Lutetia erect the Pillar of the Boatmen in honor of the Roman god Jupiter.
- Between 40 and 11 CE
  - Construction of the Forum of Lutetia
- Between 100 and 200 CE
  - Construction of the baths, the amphitheater and the theater of Lutetia
- 3rd century CE
  - Lutetia gradually becomes known as Civitas Parisiorum, the "City of the Parisii", then simply "Paris".
- c. 250 CE
  - Arrival of Christianity in Paris; execution by Romans of Bishop Saint Denis on Montmartre, the "Mountain of Martyrs".
- 275-276
  - The settlement on the left bank is ravaged by Germanic tribes.
- About 300 CE
  - A rampart is built around the Île de la Cité.
- 358 CE
  - The Roman commander Julian the Apostate resides in Paris during the winter, when not fighting the Germanic tribes.
- 360 CE
  - Julian is proclaimed Roman Emperor by his soldiers.
- 365-366
  - The Emperor Valentinian I resides briefly in Paris.
- 385
  - Saint Martin of Tours visits Paris, and according to tradition heals a leper at the north gate of the town.
- 451
  - Paris is threatened by the Huns. Saint Genevieve persuades the Parisians not to abandon the city, and the Huns attack Tours instead.
- 464
  - The city is blockaded by Childeric I, King of the Franks.

== The Middle Ages ==
=== Frankish Paris ===
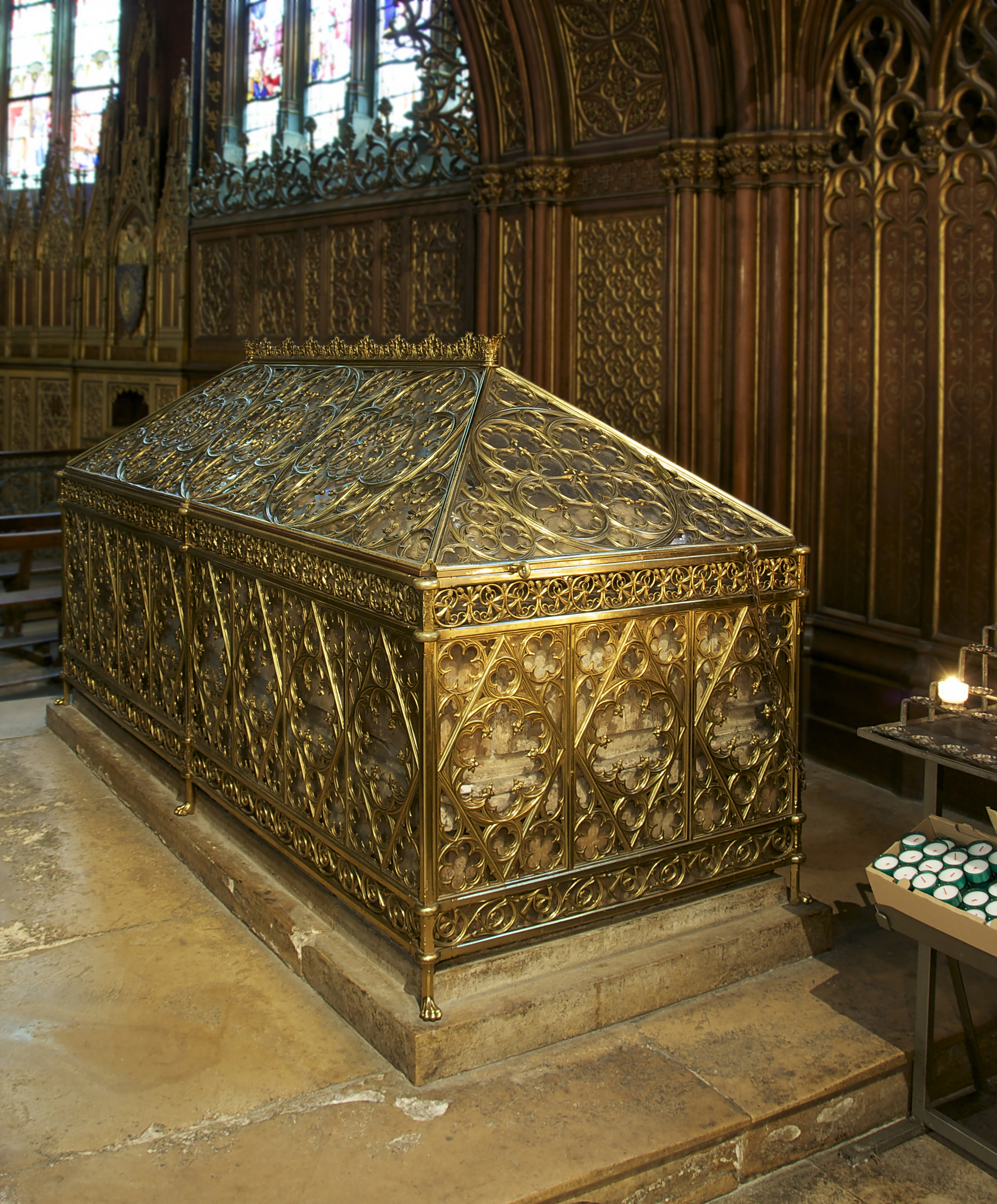
Tomb of Sainte Geneviève in the church of Saint-Étienne-du-Mont, near the Panthéon

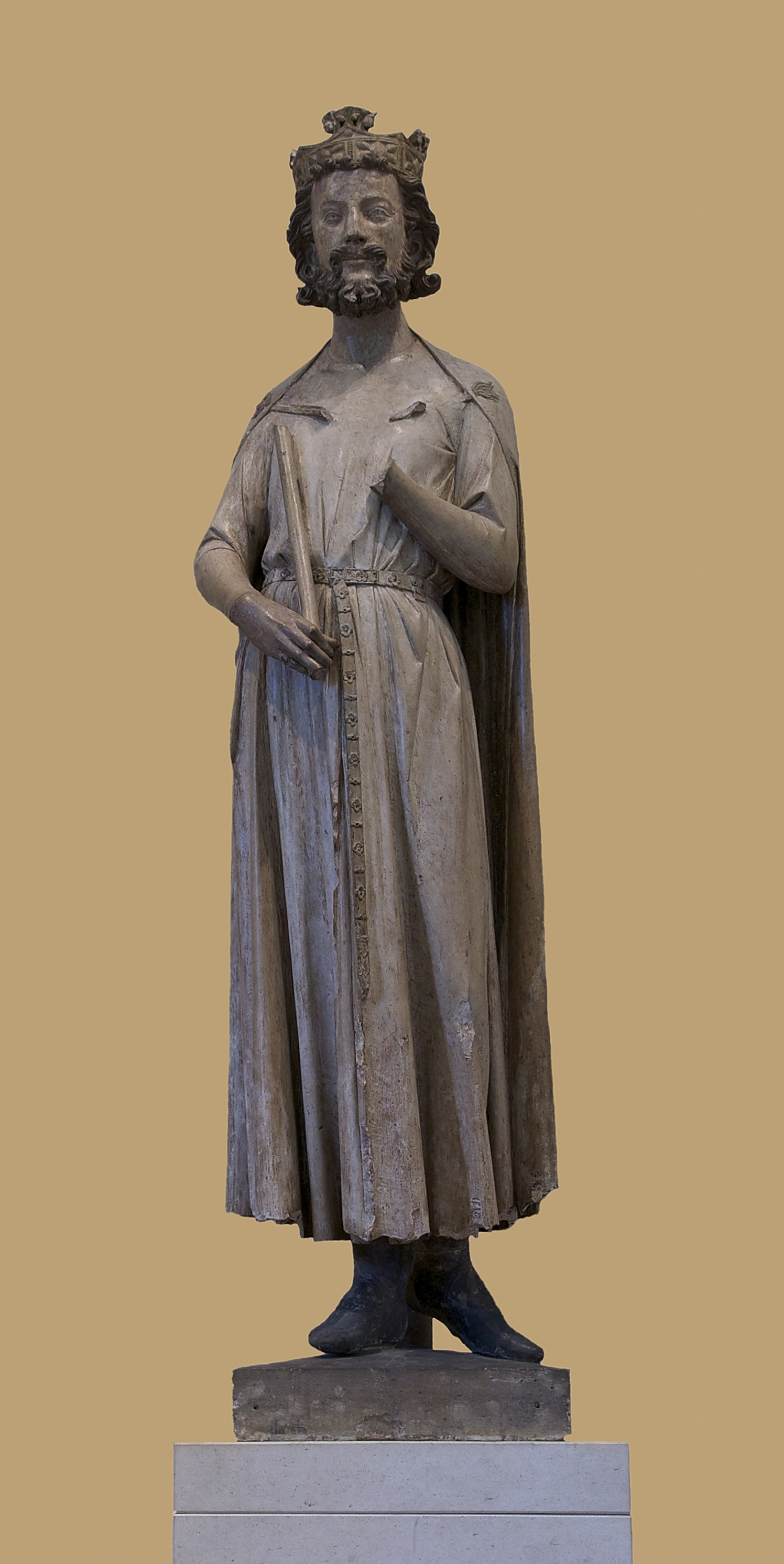
A 13th century statue of Childebert I, founder of the future Abbey of Saint-Germain-des-Prés (Louvre)

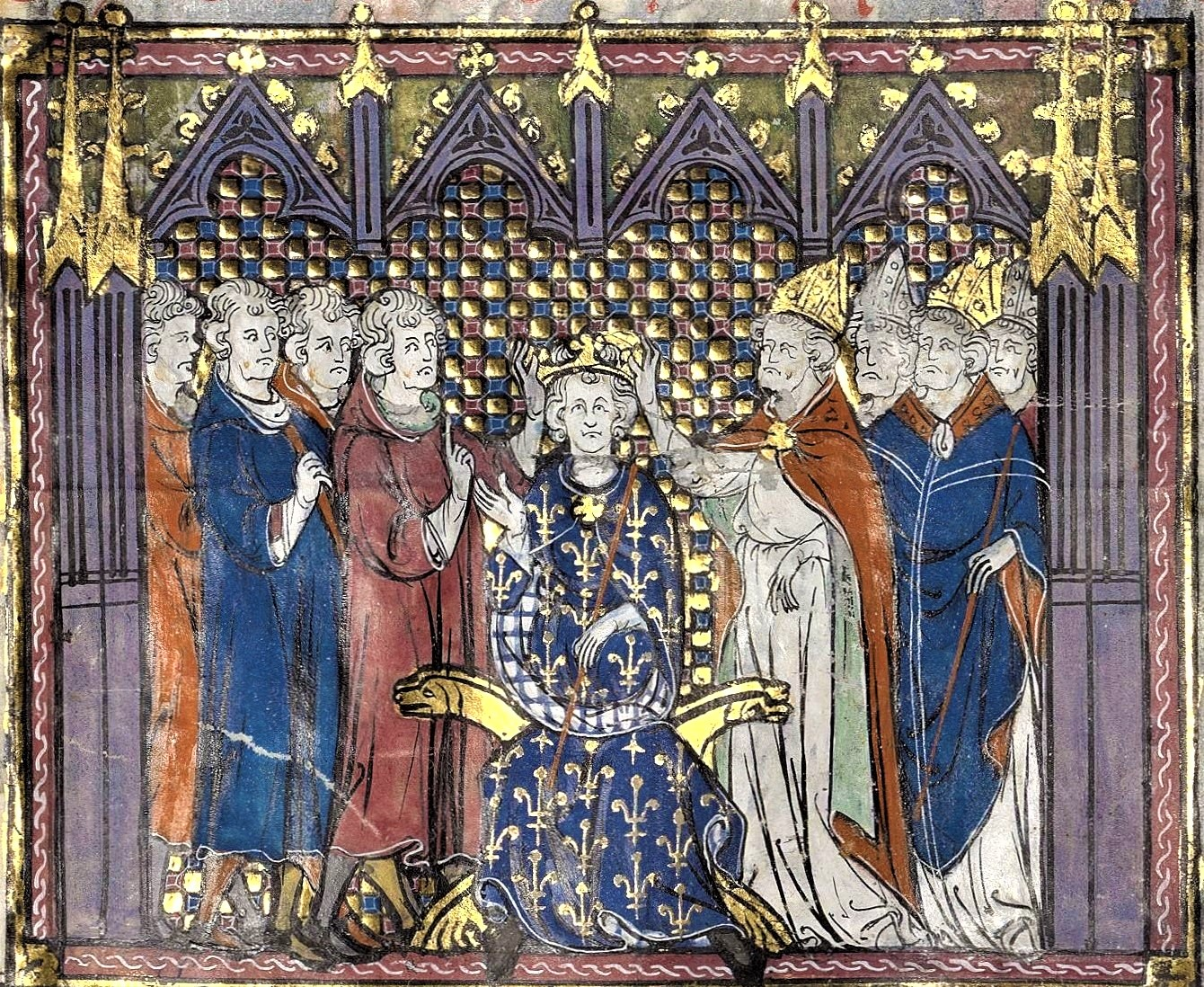
The coronation of Hugh Capet, the Count of Paris, as King of the Franks in 987. He died in Paris in 996 and was buried in the Basilica of Saint-Denis.(Illustration from the 14th century, in the National Library of France)

- 486
  - Clovis I, King of the Franks, negotiates with Saint Genevieve the submission of Paris to his authority.
- About 502
  - Burial of Saint Genevieve atop the hill on the left bank which now bears her name. A basilica, the Basilique des Saints Apôtres, is built on the site and consecrated on 24 December 520. It later becomes the site of the Basilica of Saint-Genevieve, which after the French Revolution becomes the Panthéon.
- 511
  - Clovis I, the king of the Franks, makes Paris his capital. (Some sources give the date 508)
- About 540–550
  - Construction of the Saint-Étienne cathedral, predecessor to Notre-Dame de Paris, begins.
- 543
  - Founding of the Basilica of Saint-Vincent, by Childebert I, the King of Paris. The Basilica becomes the burial place for the first French kings, beginning with Childebert.
- 576
  - Saint Germain, the Bishop of Paris, is buried at the Abbey of Saint-Vincent, which thereafter is known as the Abbey of Saint-Germain-des-Prés.
- 577
  - King Chilperic I has the Roman amphitheater repaired, and theatrical events are performed there.
- 585
  - A fire destroys most of the buildings on the Île de la Cité.
- 614
  - Council of Paris meets under King Chlothar II, who issues his Edict of Paris on 18 October.
- 639
  - King Dagobert I is buried in the abbey of Saint-Denis, which becomes the main necropolis for French kings.
- about 680
  - The city stops minting gold coins and replaces them with silver coins.
- 775
  - Consecration of the new Basilica of Saint-Denis, attended by the Emperor Charlemagne
- 820
  - Mention is made in documents of what is the oldest known street in Paris, rue Saint-Germain-l'Auxerrois (1st arrondissement).
- 845
  - Siege of Paris — The first attack on the city by the Vikings, who burn the city. King Charles the Bald gives them 7000 pounds of silver to go away.
- 846
  - Council of Meaux–Paris — The church council opened at Meaux because of the siege but ended in Paris in February 846.
- 856
  - 28 December – The Vikings return and burn the city again.
- 857
  - Vikings led by Björn Ironside almost destroy Paris, and burn all its churches, except those that pay a ransom: Saint-Étienne (now Notre-Dame cathedral), Saint-Denis and Saint-Germain-des-Prés.
- 861
  - The Vikings burn Paris and the Abbey of Saint-Germain-des-Prés. The Abbey is pillaged again in 869.
- 870
  - King Charles the Bald orders the construction of two bridges, the Grand Pont and the Petit Pont, ostensibly to block the passage of the Vikings up the Seine.
- 885
  - 24 November – Gozlin, the Bishop of Paris, repairs the city wall and reinforces the bridges; the city resists an attack by the Vikings.
- 886
  - 6 February – The Petit pont washes away, allowing the Vikings to lay siege to the city and pillage the surrounding region.
  - September – The Carolingian Emperor Charles the Fat pays the Vikings 700 pounds of silver to depart.
- 887-889
  - The Vikings attack Paris again in May 887 and June–July 888, but thanks to strengthened defenses the city is not captured.
- 978
  - October – Siege of Paris by the Holy Roman Emperor Otto II. The Parisians block the supplies of the invaders from going up the Seine. An army led by Hugh Capet arrives and the siege is finally lifted on 30 December.
- 988
  - Hugh Capet, elected King of the Franks in 987, resides in Paris for a time, and returns again in 989, 992 and 994–995.
- 996
  - Hugh Capet dies in Paris and is buried in the Basilica of Saint-Denis.

=== 11th century ===
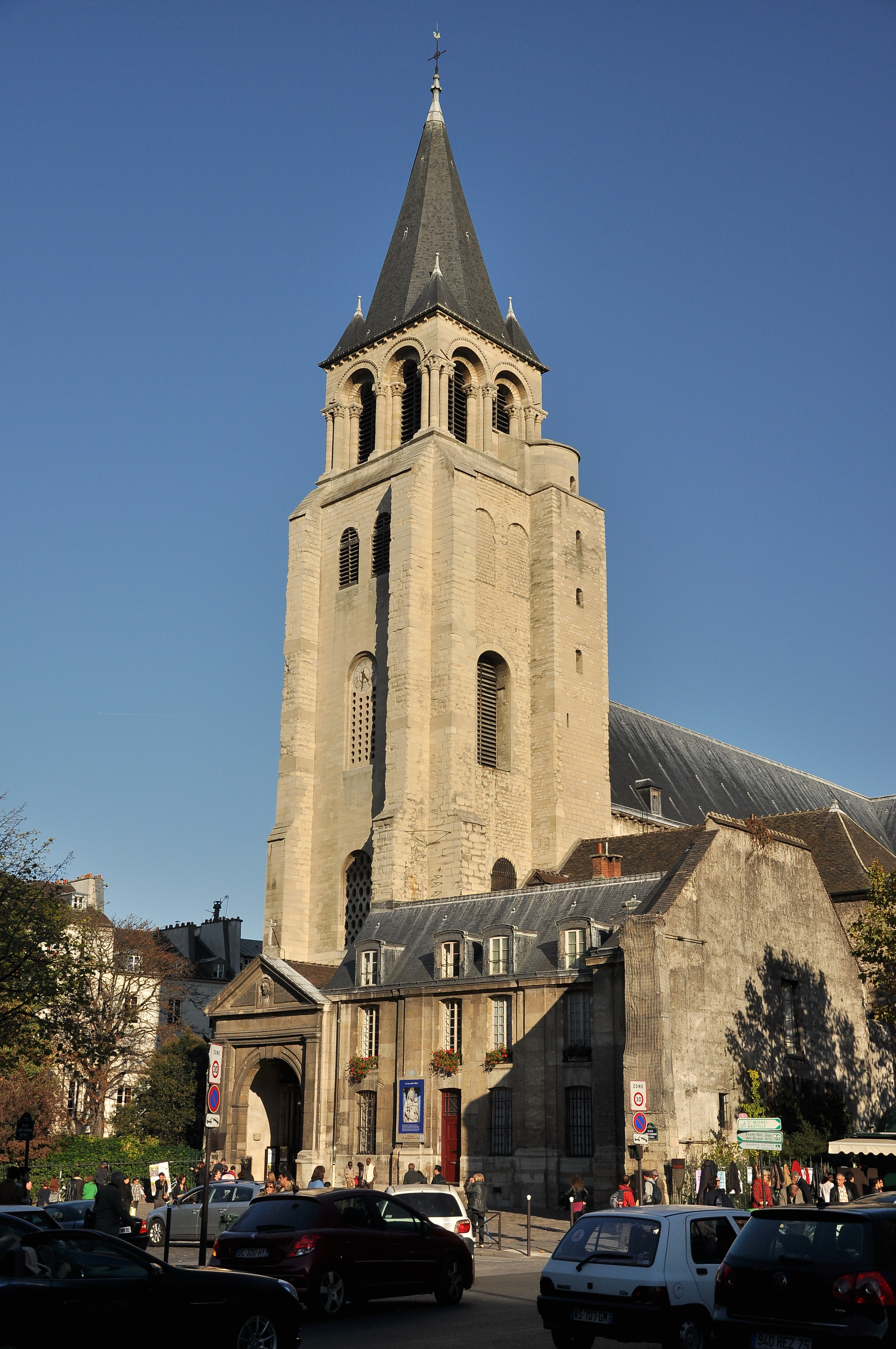
The church of the Abbey of Saint-Germain-des-Prés (nave built in 1014).

- c. 1014
  - Construction of a new nave of the church of the Abbey of Saint-Germain-des-Prés, begun by Abbot Morard.
- 1021
  - Students begin arriving in Paris to study at the episcopal school of Notre-Dame.
- 1060
  - Reconstruction of the Saint-Martin-des-Champs Priory. The church is consecrated in 1067.

=== 12th century ===
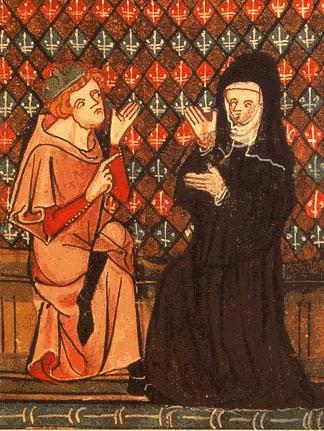
The monk and scholar Abélard and the nun Héloïse begin a legendary Paris romance in about 1116. Illustration of the couple in a manuscript of the Roman de la Rose (14th century)

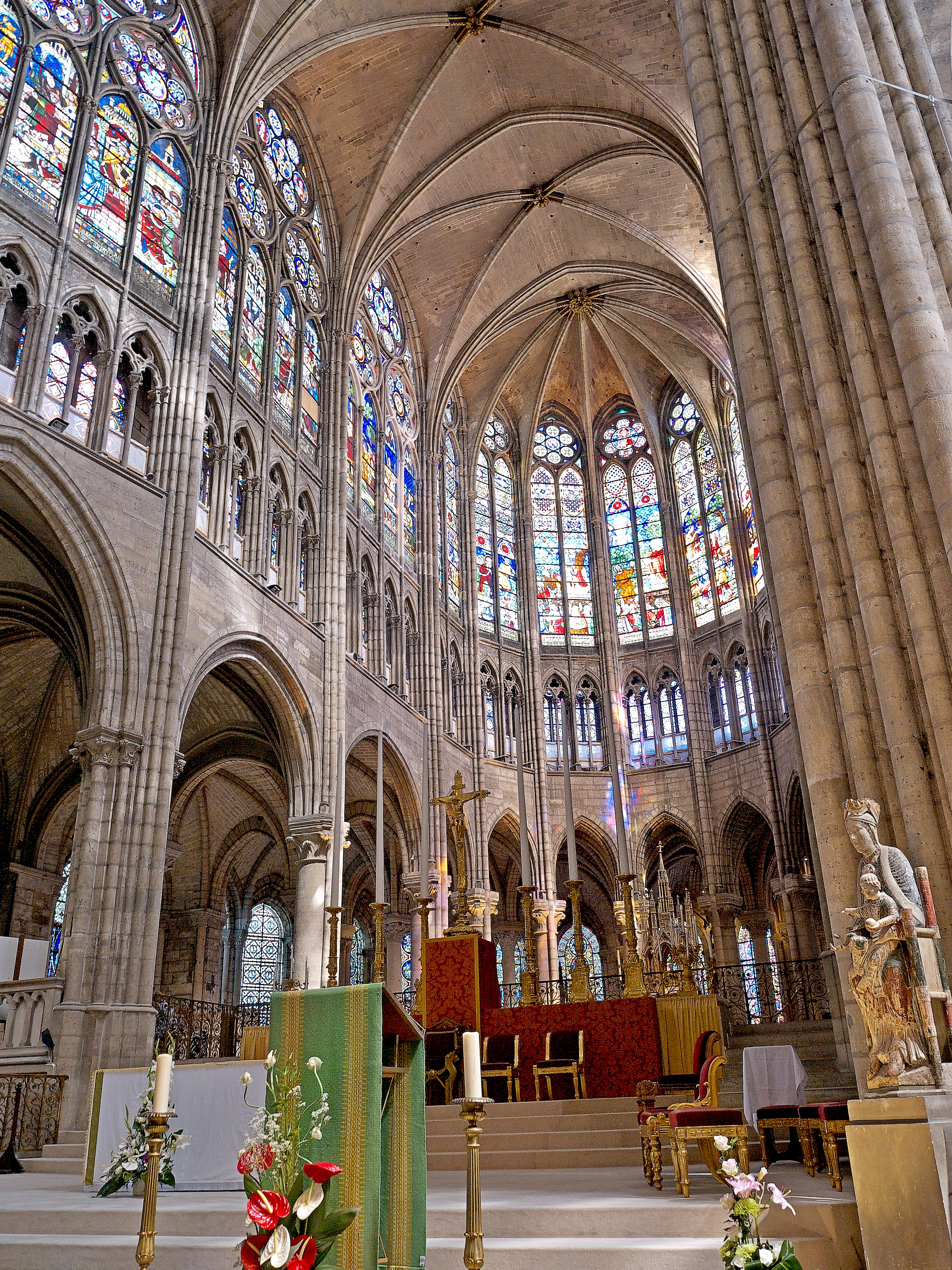
Choir of the Basilica of St-Denis, rebuilt by Suger in the new style of Gothic architecture, flooding the church with light.(Consecrated in 1144)

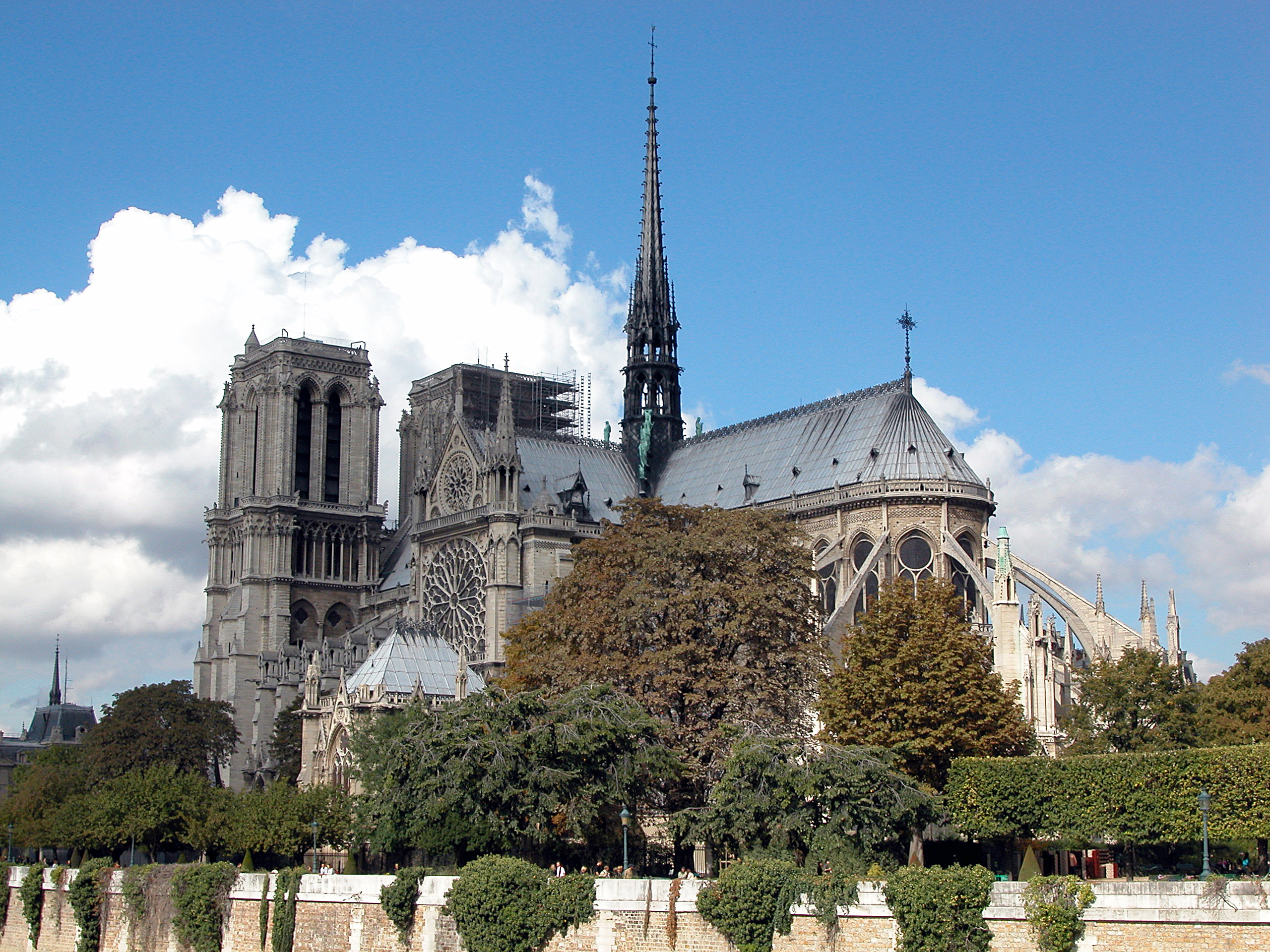
Cathedral of Notre Dame de Paris, begun 1163 and completed in 1345

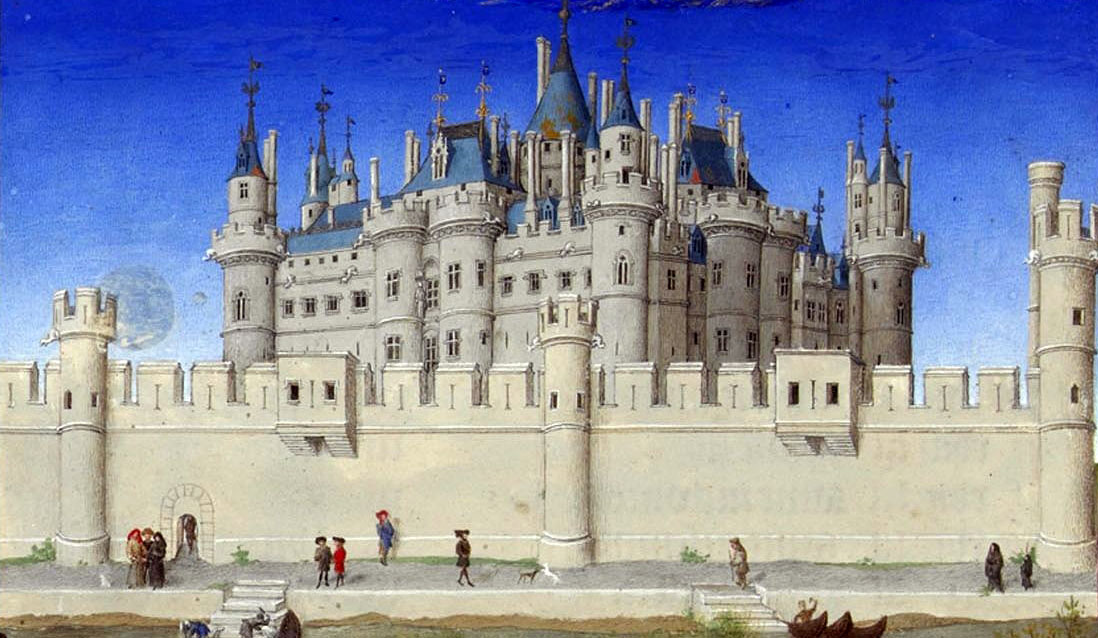
The Louvre begun in 1190, as it appeared in 1412–1416 in the Très Riches Heures du Duc de Berry (October)

- 1100s The Holy Innocents' Cemetery in Paris is established, becoming home to mass graves.
- 1100
  - The celebrated scholar Abélard begins teaching at the school of Notre-Dame.
- 1112
  - King Louis VI gives special privileges to the Basilica of Saint-Denis, raising the status of Paris over Orléans as the capital of the Capetian Kings.
- 1113
  - Construction begins of a new Grand Pont, later called the pont au Change, completed in 1116. The Petit Pont is also rebuilt.
- 1116
  - The scholar Abélard begins what becomes a legendary romance with the nun Héloïse in about 1116. In 1117 is punished for his relationship by castration. He retires to the monastery of Saint-Denis and then to Saint-Ayoul, but later returns to Paris and to Héloïse.
- c. 1120
  - Teachers and students begin taking up residence on the left bank, around the montagne Sainte-Geneviève, since the cloister of Notre-Dame is not large enough to house them all. This is the beginning of the Latin Quarter and the future University of Paris.
- 1131
  - 13 October – Death of Philippe, the eldest son of king Louis VI, who died the day after being thrown from his horse, which panicked when he encountered a pig. As a result, it is forbidden to let pigs go freely on the city streets.
- 1132
  - The Bishop of Paris punishes the teachers and students on the montagne Sainte-Geneviève for the growing number of conflicts between the students and the townspeople.
  - Abbot Suger begins the reconstruction of the Basilica of Saint-Denis in the new Gothic style. The new Basilica is consecrated on 11 June 1144, and becomes a model for cathedrals and churches across Europe.
- 1134
  - King Louis VI grants to the merchants of Paris the right to seize the property of their debtors and to form associations, the first steps toward a municipality.
- 1137
  - A new market is installed at Champeaux, which gradually replaces the market on the place de Grève and becomes the central market of Les Halles.
- 1139
  - Establishment of the Templars in the old Temple, near the church of Saint-Gervais.
- 1146
  - First mention in documents of the corporation of butchers in the city.
- 1147
  - The Templars occupy their new building in Paris, in the presence of king Louis VII and of the Pope. When he departs for the Crusades, the king leaves the royal treasury in the care of the Templars, and the regency with Abbot Suger of Saint-Denis.
  - 21 April – Pope Eugene III consecrates the new church of Saint-Pierre-de-Montmartre.
- 1163
  - 21 April – Consecration of the choir of the abbey church of Saint-Germain-des-Prés by Pope Alexander III.
  - Beginning of the reconstruction of the cathedral of Notre Dame de Paris in the Gothic style.
- 1170
  - King Louis VII confirms the privileges of the corporation of water merchants, whose water-bearers carry water from the Seine to residences.
- 1176
  - First mention in documents of the Fair of Saint-Germain. Half of the profits were reserved for King Louis VII.
- 1180
  - Founding of the collège des Dix-Huit by Messire Josse de Londres, an Englishman. This was the first college in Paris, established for eighteen poor clerical students in a room within the Hôtel-Dieu.
  - 5 February – King Philip Augustus (Philippe Auguste) arrests the leaders of the Jewish community, and requires them to pay 15,000 silver marcs.
- 1182
  - Philip Augustus expels the Jews from the Île de la Cité, and their synagogue is turned into a church. They are allowed to return in 1198, in return for paying heavy taxes.
  - 19 May – Consecration of the altar of the cathedral of Notre Dame.
- 1183
  - Two market buildings are constructed at the small hamlet Les Champeaux meaning ("little fields"), the beginning of Les Halles.
- 1186
  - Philip Augustus orders the paving of the major streets of the city with cobblestones (pavés).
- 1190
  - Philip Augustus departs for the Third Crusade. Six Paris merchants are assigned to act as a council of the regency in his absence, each with a key to the treasury. Before departing, he orders the construction of the first wall around the entire city. The wall on the right bank is finished in 1208, and on the left bank between 1209 and 1213. He also begins construction of the fortress of the Louvre on the right bank.
- 1197
  - March – A flood destroys all the bridges over the Seine; the King is forced to abandon his palace on the Île de la Citè and move to the hill of Sainte-Geneviève.

=== 13th century ===
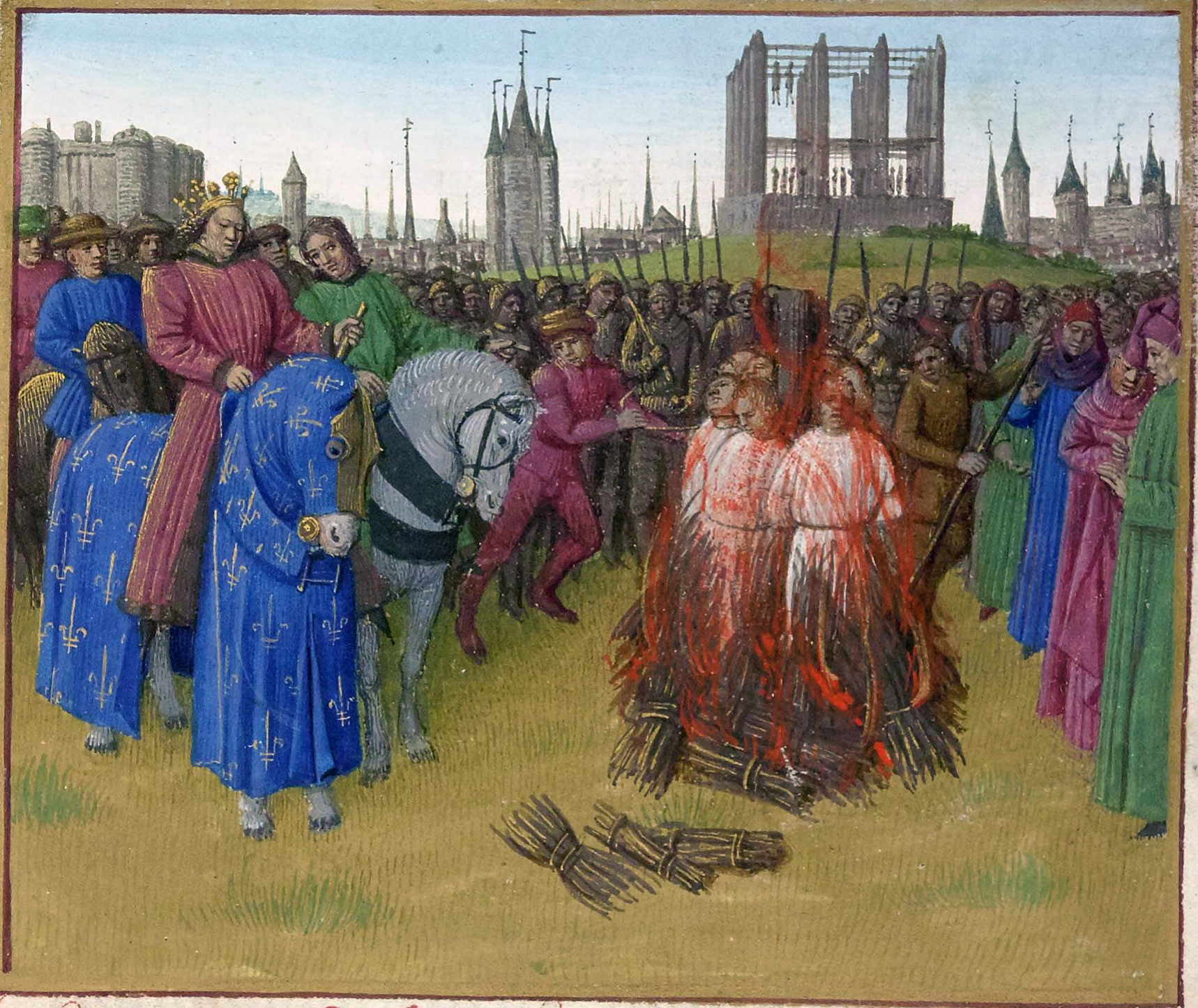
Burning of the followers of Amaury de Chartres, in the presence of King Philip Augustus. (1210) The tower of the Knights Templar and the gibbet of Montfaucon, where the bodies of executed prisoners were hung, can be seen in the background. Painting by Jean Fouquet in the 15th century.

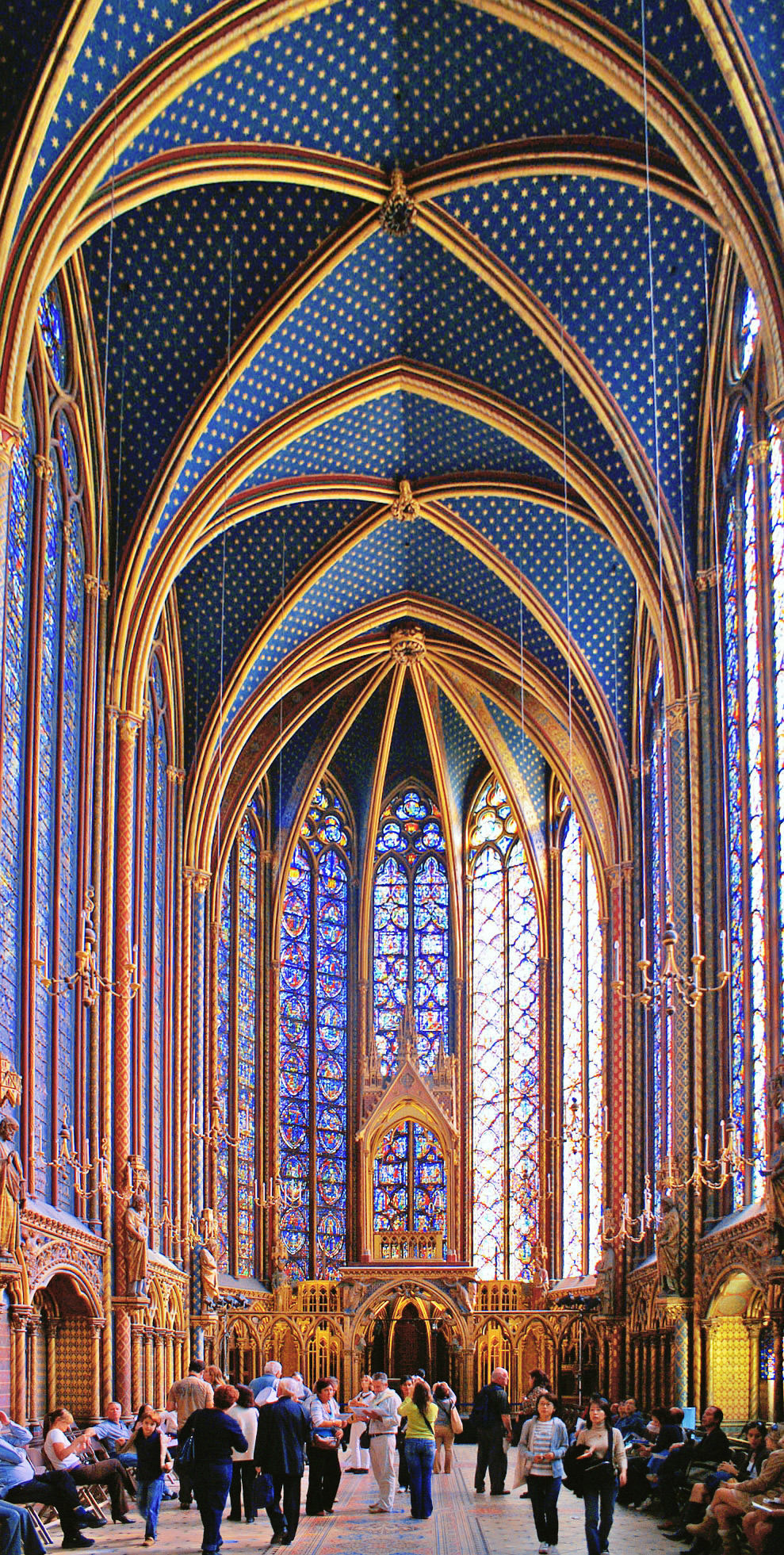
Sainte-Chapelle, the masterpiece of flamboyant Gothic architecture, consecrated in 1248.

- 1200
  - Battles between the sergeants of the Provost of Paris and students, which cause the death of five students. When the Paris students threaten to leave the city, Philip Augustus grants the students the right to be judged exclusively by the tribunal of the Bishop of Paris. This marks the beginning of the legal status of the University of Paris.
- 1202
  - Completion of the Louvre fortress.
  - The Abbot of Saint-Geneviève purchases the clos Garlande on the Left Bank and builds houses in the neighborhood for students.
- 1207
  - Pope Innocent III limits the number of chairs of theology at the university to eight, to maintain control over the university.
- 1209
  - The second college of the university is founded; the Collège des pauvres écoliers de Saint-Honoré, for thirteen students without funds.
- 1210
  - Pope Innocent III permits the teachers of the university to form a corporation, and in 1212 gives them a degree of independence from the authority of the Bishop of Paris.
  - Ten Amauriciens, students of the scholar Amaury de Chartres, are condemned for heresy and burned at the stake outside of Paris, beyond the rampart gate porte des Champeaux, for making too much of the works of Aristotle.
- 1215 – The University of Paris is chartered by Pope Innocent III.
- 1219
  - 16 November – Pope Innocent III prohibits the teaching of Roman, or civil law, at the university; only canon law can be taught.
  - December – Conflicts between the Bishop of Paris and the university, which is supported by the new Pope, Honorius III.
- 1229
  - 26 February – More street battles between students and the sergeants of the Provost of Paris. On 15 April the university temporarily leaves the city in protest, and some of the teachers depart for Oxford and Cambridge.
- 1230
  - Paris scriptoria producing illuminated manuscripts flourish. The style of the Paris school is copied throughout France.
- 1231
  - Draining of the marshes Le Marais begins.
- c. 1240
  - For the first time, the ringing of the bells of the churches of Paris is regulated by clocks, so that all sound at about the same time. The time of day becomes an important feature in regulating the work and life of the city.
- 1246
  - The University of Paris is granted financial and judicial autonomy, and its own seal.
  - Founding of the College and Priory of Saint-Bernard, to house the Cistercian monks who have come to Paris to study theology.
- 1248
  - Saint Bonaventure begins to teach at the University of Paris.
  - 26 April – Consecration of Sainte-Chapelle, built to house sacred relics from the Holy Land purchased by Louis IX (Saint Louis).
- c. 1250
  - Founding of the Parlement of Paris (Curia Regis), to advise the King on legal matters and later to make judicial decisions.
- 1252
  - Saint Thomas Aquinas begins to teach at the University of Paris, and remains until 1259. He returns between 1269 and 1272.
- 1254
  - June – Alphonse de Poitiers, brother of Louis IX, moves into his recently built townhouse (hôtel d'Hosteriche) near the Louvre. Following his example, other princes of the blood and members of the high aristocracy built princely residences in the same neighborhood.
- 1256
  - 10 June – First stone laid for the Abbaye royale de Longchamp, the royal convent of Longchamp, by Isabelle, Louis IX's sister.
- 1257
  - 1 September – Opening of a new college of the university founded by Robert de Sorbon, advisor to the King, later known as the College of Sorbonne.
- 1260
  - Geoffroy de Courfraud is named the first chevalier de guet, or knight of the watchmen, responsible for security in the city.
  - Corporation of surgeons and corporation of barbers are organized.
- 1261
  - Étienne Boileau is named the first prévôt, or provost of Paris, the royal administrator of the city.
  - A new college is organized for students of the Abbey of Cluny.
- 1263
  - Évroïn de Valenciennes becomes the first recorded provost of the merchants of Paris, a position which gradually becomes equivalent to that of mayor.
- 1280
  - December – A major flood washes away two arches of the Grand Pont and one arch of the Petit Pont, and encircles the city on the right bank.
- 1291
  - May – King Philip IV, ("Philip the Fair"), expels the money-lenders, or Lombards, from the city.
- 1292
  - First written mention of the Paris concierges, who serve as doormen and guardians at palaces, convents and private mansions.
- 1296
  - The fortifications of the Palais de la Cité are demolished and the palace is enlarged, so that by 1314 it houses all of the royal administration.
  - The Conseil de Ville, or city council, is organized, made up of twenty-four leading citizens.
- 1299
  - First mention of the construction of a clock tower in Paris (installation of clock will take place in 1370).

=== 14th century ===
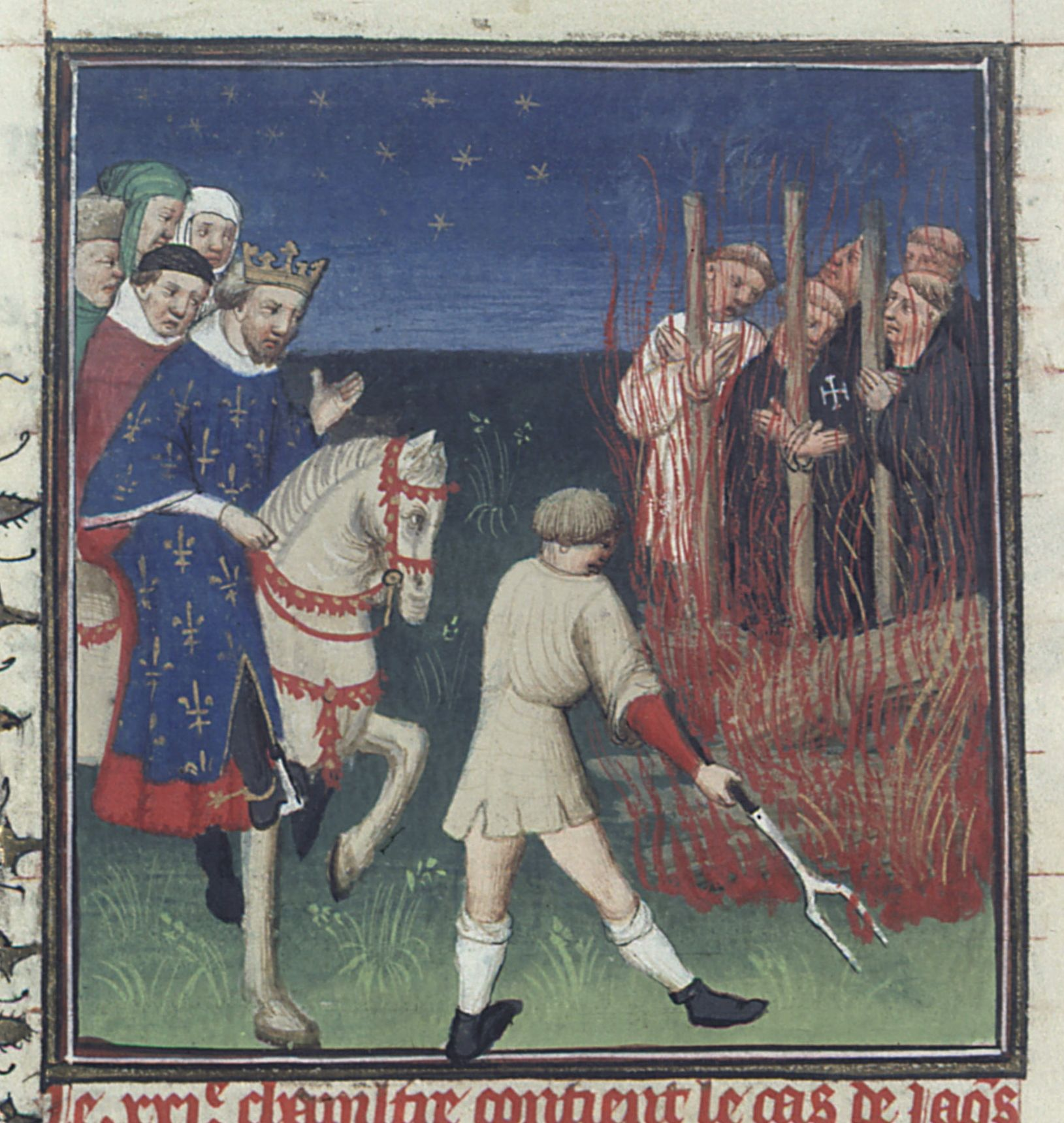
Burning at the stake of Jacques de Molay and the leaders of the Knights Templar on the Île aux Juifs, in the Seine (1314), as described by the poet Boccaccio (French National Library)

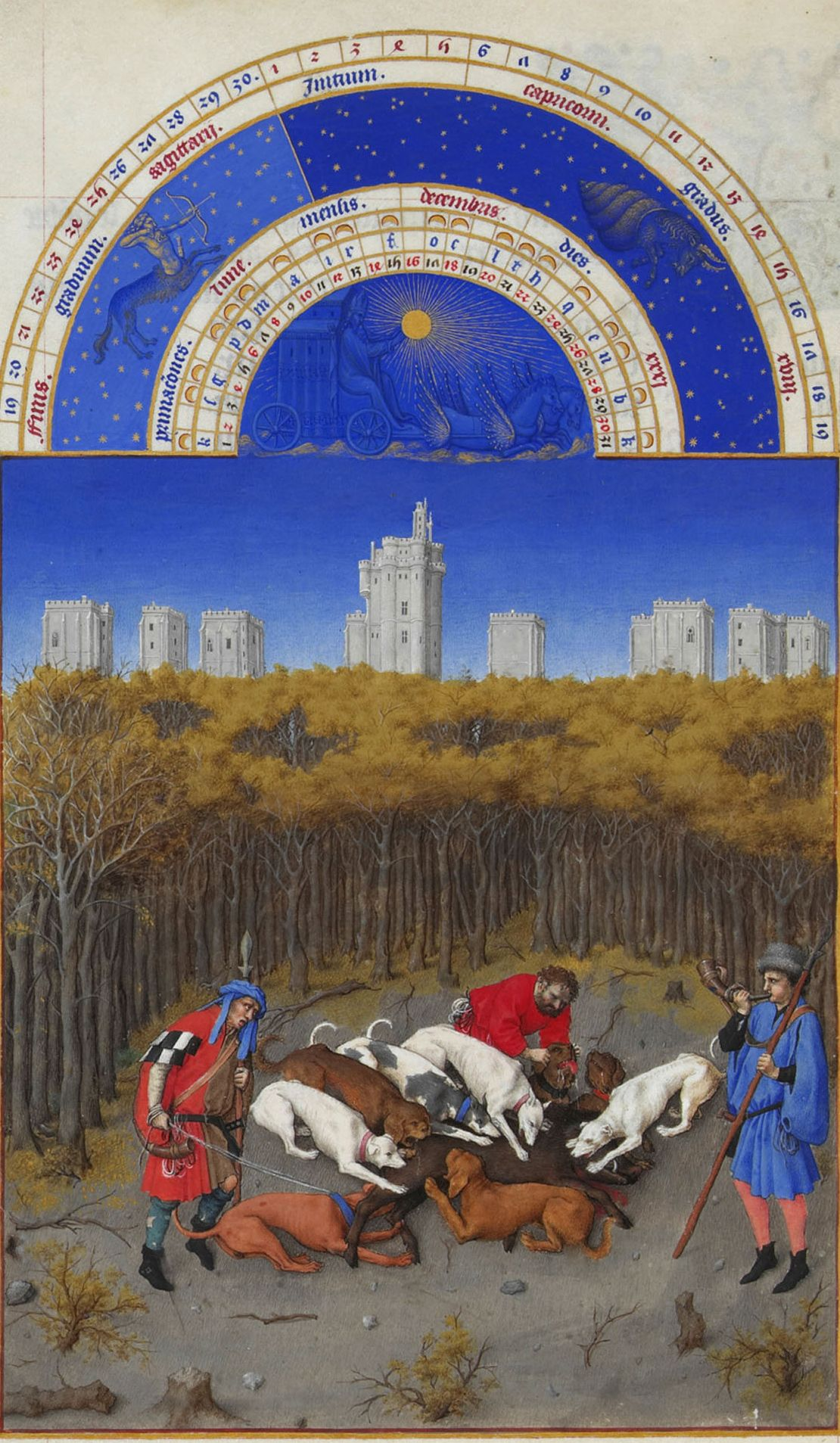
The towers of the Château de Vincennes (begun in 1337, completed in about 1410) as shown in the Très Riches Heures du Duc de Berry (December), in about 1412.

- 1302
  - First meeting of the Estates General convened by King Philippe IV, to win support for his conflict with Pope Boniface VIII.
- 1304
  - Money-changers establish themselves on the Grand Pont, which becomes known as the Pont-au-Change.
- 1306
  - 21 July – Expulsion of the Jews from Paris, and confiscation of their property. They are allowed to return in July 1315, but recover only a third of their property.
  - 30 December – Riots following an increase in rents. King Philip IV is besieged in the tower of the temple. Twenty-one rioters are later hanged.
- 1307
  - 13 October – Philip IV orders the arrest of the Knights Templar, and the seizure of their property.
- 1310
  - Construction begins of a clock tower in the Palace on the Île de la Cité, finished in 1314.
- 1314
  - The leaders of the Knights Templar, including Jacques de Molay, are burned at the stake on the Île aux Juifs, also called Île des Templiers, an island west of the Île de la Cité.
- 1321
  - 14 September – Organization of the first recorded company of musicians, the Confrérie de Saint-Julien-des-Ménétriers.
- 1326
  - The breakup of ice on the Seine destroys all the wooden bridges. The Île de la Cité is supplied with food by boat for a period of five weeks.
- 1337
  - Construction begins of the Château de Vincennes, completed about 1410.
- 1339
  - Founding of the first two recorded theater companies in Paris; the Confrérie de la Passion, which originally performed religious dramas, and the Gallants sans souci, which performed farces.
- 1348–1349
  - The Black death, or bubonic plague, ravages Paris. In May 1349, it becomes so severe that the Royal Council flees the city.
- 1348
  - Building of the first open sewer in Paris. It begins at place Baudoyer, runs east along rue Saint-Antoine, and empties into the moat of the Bastille.
- 1354
  - Étienne Marcel is chosen as the Provost of the merchants of Paris.
- 1356
  - Decision to build a new wall around the city, called the wall of Charles V, finished in 1383.
  - 19 September – The capture of King Jean II (Jean le Bon) by the English at the Battle of Poitiers throws France into political chaos and opens the Hundred Years War.
- 1357
  - 7 July – Étienne Marcel buys a house on the place de Grève to serve as the first city hall.
- 1358
  - 22 February; Armed supporters of Étienne Marcel invade the Palace. In the presence of the Dauphin, Charles, the heir to the throne, future Charles V, they kill the Marshals of Champagne and Normandy, and take the Dauphin under their protection. On 24 February, four Paris merchants, including Étienne Marcel, become members of the new royal council.
  - 4 May – King Charles II of Navarre, accompanied by an army of English mercenaries, enters Paris. Étienne Marcel takes his side, and the Dauphin flees the city.
  - 22 July – Battles within and around Paris between supporters of the Dauphin and of Charles of Navarre. Charles of Navarre flees the city.
  - 31 July – Étienne Marcel attempts to open the gates of the city to the mercenaries of Charles of Navarre, and is killed at the bastion of Saint-Antoine by supporters of the Dauphin.
  - 2 August – The Dauphin returns to Paris. The leading supporters of Étienne Marcel and Charles of Navarre are executed, but others are given a general amnesty. The Dauphin buys the Hôtel Saint-Pol in the Saint-Paul quarter, and lives there until his death.
- 1368
  - The course of the Bièvre River at the moat of Saint-Bernard is diverted to empty into the Seine at La Tournelle. The portion within the city is covered and used as a sewer.
- 1370
  - A royal decree orders that all churches ring their bells at the hour and quarter-hour, as determined by the clock installed in the square courtyard of the Palais de la Cité.
  - 22 April – Placement of the first stone of the Bastille.
- 1378
  - Construction of the first Pont Saint-Michel, known then as the Pont-neuf; finished in 1387.
- 1390
  - 29 October – First trial for sorcery, Jeanne de Brigue is convicted by the Parlement of Paris and burned at the stake on 19 August 1391.
- 1391
  - August – Founding of the first corporation of artists, the Confrérie des peintres and tailleurs d'images.
- 1393
  - The publication of first cookbook and how to run a household, titled Le Ménagier de Paris.
- 1394
  - 17 September – A Royal edict expels Jews from France. The Jewish community loses its legal identity for the next four centuries.
- 1398
  - First measures to relax church control over the university. Students and professors of the school of medicine are permitted to marry.

== 15th century – the Burgundians and English in Paris ==
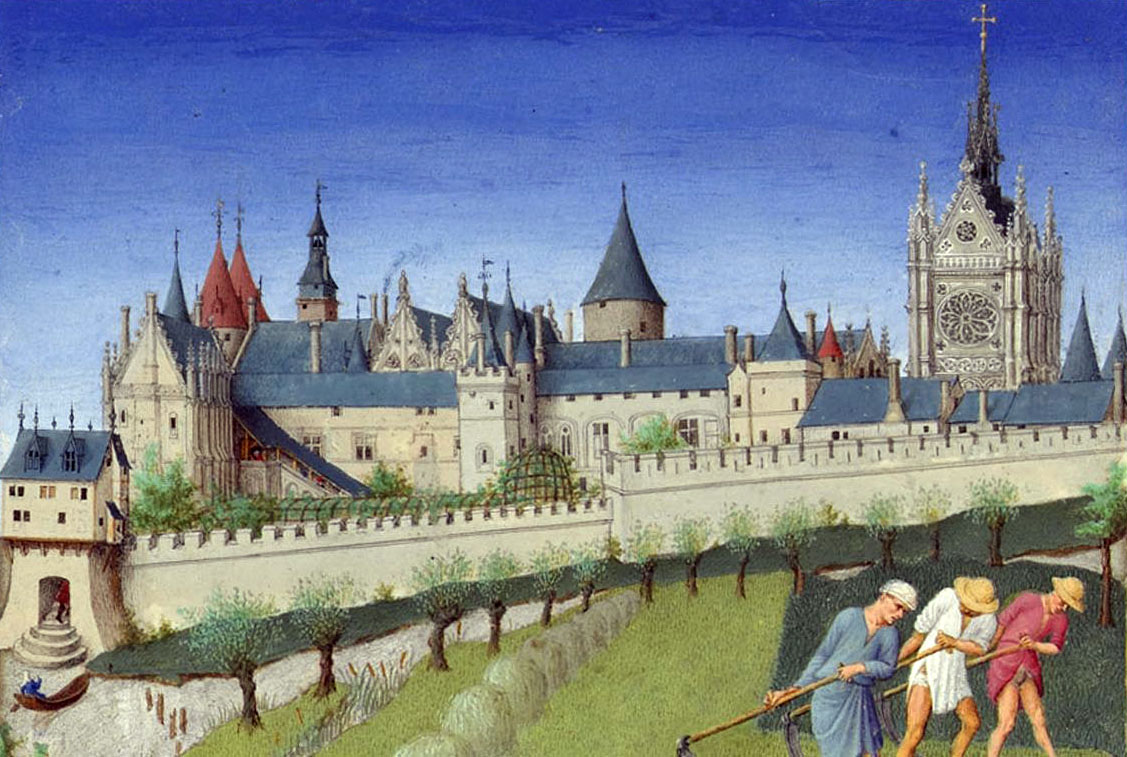
The Palais de la Cité as it appeared between 1412 and 1416, as illustrated in the Très Riches Heures du Duc de Berry (June).

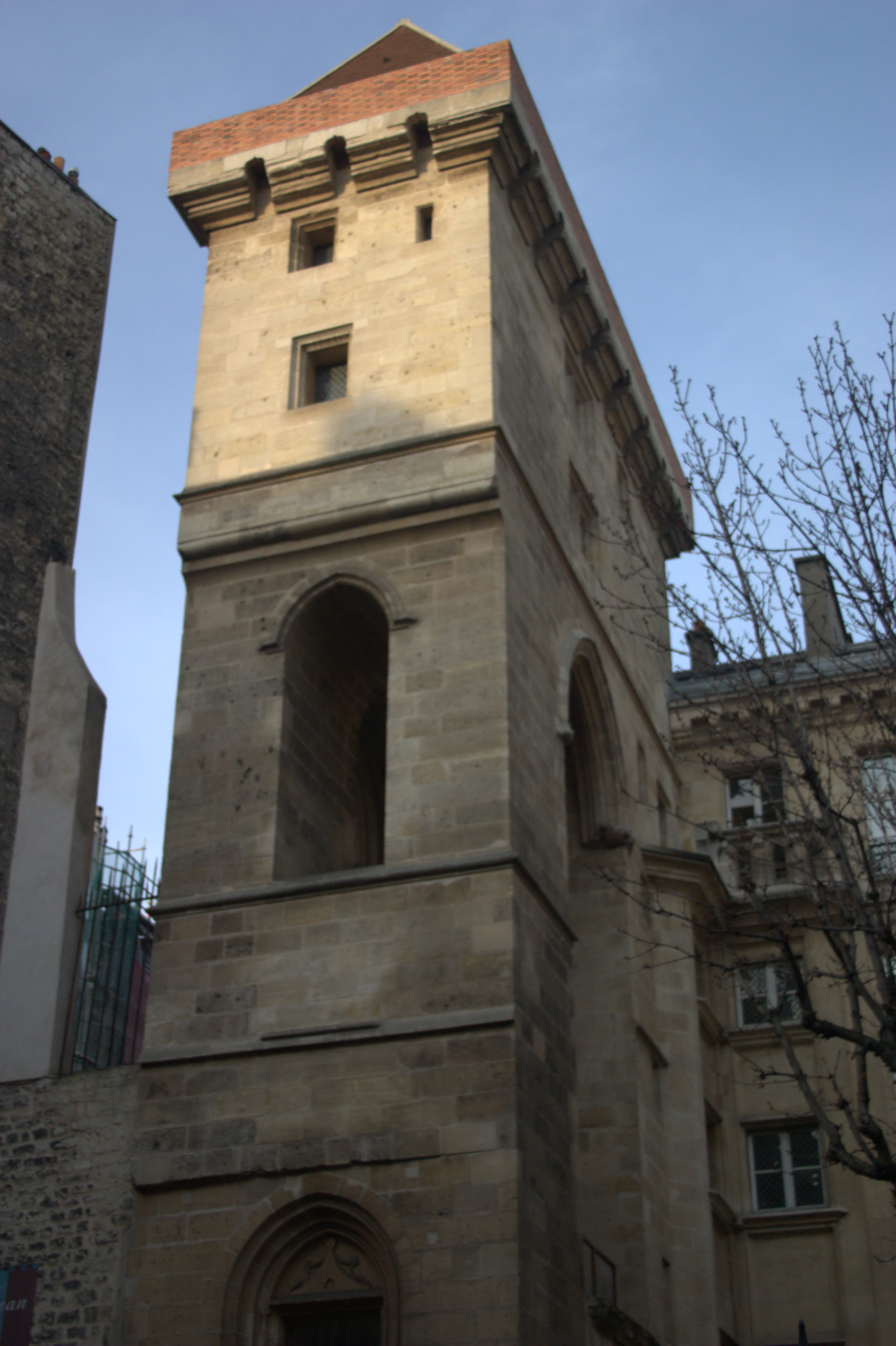
The Tour Jean-sans-Peur, last vestige of the Burgundian occupation (15th century), at 20 rue Étienne Marcel in 2nd arrondissement.

- 1404
  - 18 July – Louis, Duke of Orléans, highly unpopular with the Parisians, flees Paris, taking with him the infant Dauphin of France, the future Charles VII of France.
  - 19 July – Jean Sans Peur, Duke of Burgundy, makes a triumphant return into Paris.
- 1407
  - First officially sanctioned dissection of a cadaver at the faculty of medicine of the university.
  - 23 November – Murder of the Duke of Orléans on the rue Vielle-du-Temple, by assassins sent by Jean Sans Peur.
- 1408
  - 31 January – The breakup of the ice on the Seine destroys the Petit pont and the Grand pont.
  - 28 June – Jean Sans Peur enters Paris at the head of a small army. He is welcomed by the Parisians, and departs in July.
- 1411
  - Jean Sans Peur establishes himself in Paris, but the city is soon divided into two rival factions: the Burgundians, supporters of Jean sans Peur; and the Armagnacs, supporters of Louis VII, Duke of Bavaria and Bernard VII, Count of Armagnac.
- 1413
  - July–August – After a series of riots and disturbances, the Armagnacs gain control of Paris from the Burgundians; Jean Sans Peur flees the city.
- 1418
  - 29 May – Burgundian coup d'état – The Armagnacs have become increasingly unpopular in Paris. During the night of May 29, the merchants of Paris open the porte Saint-Germain-des Prés to the Burgundian soldiers. Bernard VII, Count of Armagnac, and the other leaders of the Armagnacs are arrested in their beds and massacred on 12 June.
  - 14 July – Jean Sans Peur and Queen Isabeau enter Paris by the Porte Saint-Antoine. The fifteen-year-old Dauphin, the future Charles VII of France, escapes the city.
- 1419
  - 10 September – Jean Sans Peur goes to meet the Dauphin at the bridge of Montereau, and is killed by the Dauphin's supporters (the Armagnacs).
- 1420
  - 30 May – Philip the Good (Philippe le Bon), the new Duke of Burgundy and ruler of Paris, forms an alliance with the English and persuades King Charles the Mad (Charles le Fol) and leaders of university and the merchants of Paris take an oath to accept Henry V of England as the heir to the French throne.
  - 1 December – King Henry V of England arrives in Paris and takes residence at the Louvre, while King Charles VI the Mad is moved to the hôtel Saint-Pol.
- 1422
  - 31 August – Death of Henry V of England, followed on 21 October by the death of Charles VI of France. Thereafter the kings of France spend very little time in Paris, until 1528, when François I returns there with the court.
- 1423
  - February – The leaders of Paris take an oath of allegiance to the Duke of Bedford, representing Henry VI of England, who is in England and just one year old.
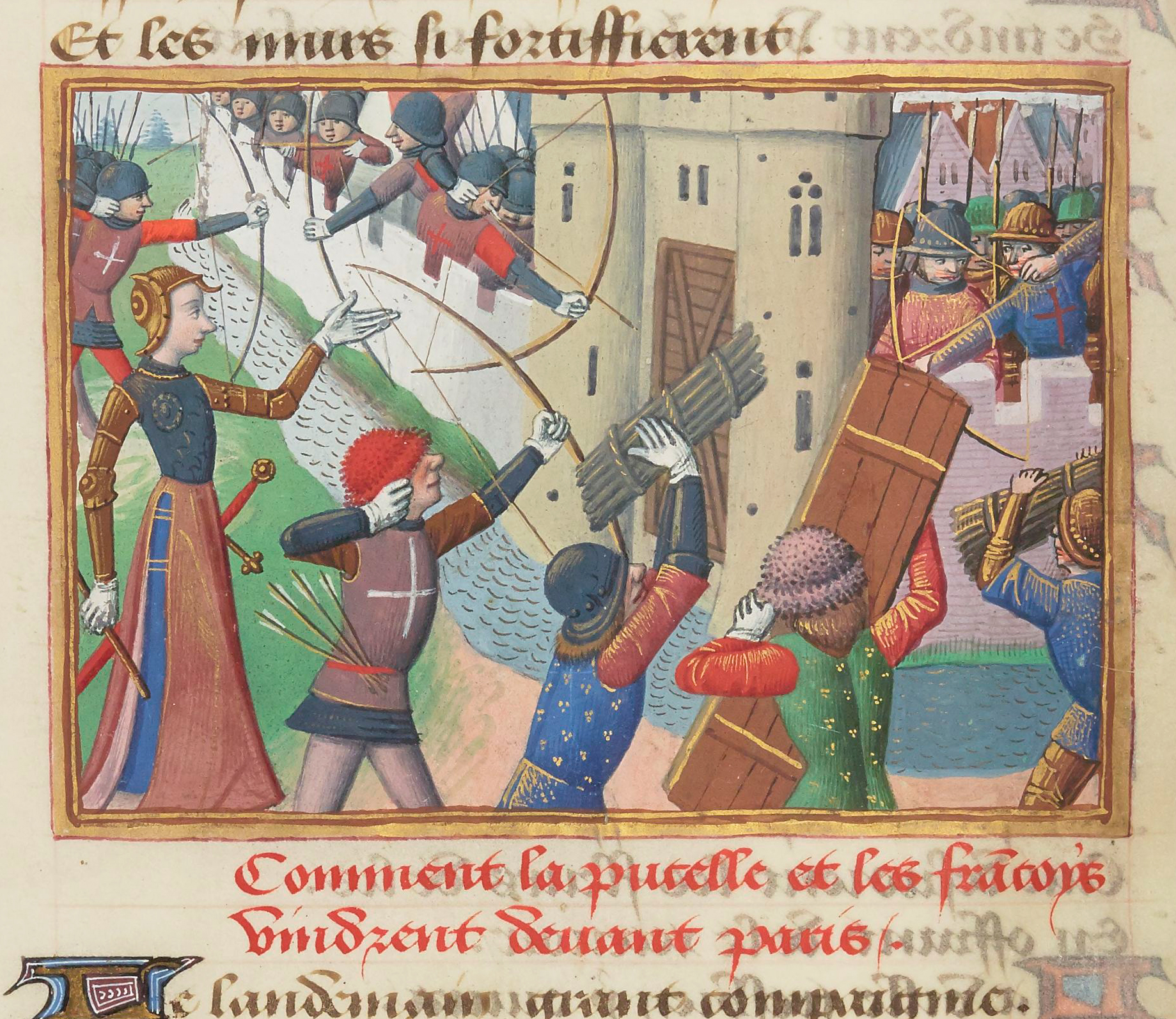
    Joan of Arc unsuccessfully lays siege to Paris, held by the Burgundians, and is wounded – Illustration from the Vigile du roi Charles VII (1429)
- 1427
  - First record of the arrival of the Romani people, or gypsies, in Paris.
- 1429
  - 8 September – Joan of Arc, fighting for King Charles VII (Charles le Victorieux), tries and fails to retake Paris. She is wounded outside the Porte Saint-Honoré.
- 1430
  - May – Joan of Arc, captured by the Burgundians in 1429, is handed over to the English in Rouen and brought to trial for heresy. The case against her is prepared by the Bishop Pierre Cauchon. At Cauchon's request, the faculty of the University of Paris endorses the charge of heresy against her. She is convicted and burned at the stake.
- 1431
  - 16 December. Henry VI of England, nine years old, comes to Paris for a month and is crowned King of France at the Cathedral of Notre Dame by his uncle, the Cardinal of Winchester.
- 1432
  - March to 8 April – Floods submerge Le Marais from the porte Saint-Antoine to the porte Saint-Martin.
- 1436
  - 28 February – After a series of victories, the army of Charles VII surrounds Paris. Charles VII promises amnesty to the Parisians who supported the Burgundians and English.
  - 13 April – Uprising within the city against the English and Burgundians; the soldiers of Charles VII enter the city through the porte Saint-Jacques.
  - 15 April – The English soldiers are allowed to depart by boat on the Seine for Rouen.
- 1437
  - 12 November – Charles VII returns to Paris, but remains only three weeks. He moves his residence and the court to the Châteaux of the Loire Valley.
- 1438
  - Epidemics of bubonic plague and smallpox strike the city.
- 1446
  - 26 March – The university has its independence limited, and is put under the authority of the Parlement of Paris.
- 1447
  - Establishment of the tapestry workshop of the Gobelins family beside the Bièvre River in the faubourg Saint-Marcel.
- 1450
  - 26 July – Ordinance sets the procedure for the election of the Provost of the merchants and the échevins, or municipal magistrates.
- 1464
  - Performance in Paris of La Farce de Maistre Pierre Pathelin, the first notable French comedy.
- 1465
  - 7 July – The Count of Charolais, Charles le Téméraire, and other nobles, forming the League of the Public Weal, rebel against King Louis XI (Louis le Prudent) and attack Paris, but are repelled.
  - Louis XI takes sanctuary in Paris and asks the support of the merchants, university and clergy, whose franchises he abolished in 1461. The siege of Paris by the league continues until 29 October, when a treaty is signed with Louis XI.
- 1467
  - The neighborhood militias are abolished, and replaced by sixty-one detachments of professional soldiers, reviewed by Louis XI on 14 September.
    Page of the first book to be printed in Paris, Letters by Gasparin de Bergame.
- 1469
  - The first French printing-press was set up in the Sorbonne.
- 1470
  - Publication of the first book to be printed in France, Letters by Gasparin de Bergame.
- 1474
  - Reconstruction of the hôtel de Sens (Hôtel des archevêques de Sens) by the Archbishop Tristan de Salazar.
- 1476
  - Printing of the first Bible in Paris.
- 1477
  - Establishment of royal postal service with couriers on horseback.
- 1485
  - Construction begins of the Hôtel de Cluny for the Abbots of the Cluny Monastery, finished in 1510. It is now the museum of the Middle Ages.
- 1494
  - The municipality of Paris refuses to loan King Charles VIII (Charles l'Affable) 100,000 écus for a military expedition to Italy, which it considers useless.
  - 15 March – Founding of the convent of the Minimes at Chaillot.
- 1496
  - First recorded case of syphilis in Paris, brought from Italy by soldiers of Charles VIII. Foreigners in the city with the disease are expelled from the city on 6 March 1497.
- 1497
  - A flood of the Seine reaches the place de Grève, place Maubert and the rue Saint-André-des-Arts.
- 1499
  - October 25 – A flood of the Seine causes the collapse of the wooden pont Notre-Dame.

== 16th century – The wars of religion ==
- 1500
  - 6 July – Reconstruction begins of the Pont Notre-Dame in stone, replacing the wooden bridge which collapsed on 25 October 1499. The new bridge is finished in 1514.
- 1504
  - July – Ordinance of the Parlement de Paris for the lighting of Paris streets; at nine in the evening Parisians are required to put a candle in a lantern in their window. The ordinance is not widely obeyed, and is repeated in 1524, 1526, 1551, and later.
- 1505
  - Publication of the first printed Book of Hours in Roman letters. The use of Gothic script gradually disappears.
  - 5 April – The direction of the Hôtel-Dieu hospital is transferred from the chanoines of Notre-Dame cathedral to eight laymen governors selected among the business leaders of Paris by the City Assembly,
- 1521
  - 15 April – The College of Sorbonne formally condemns the teachings of Martin Luther.
- 1523
  - First French translation of the New Testament of the Bible published. In 1525, alarmed by this unauthorized text, the theology faculty of the University of Paris forbids further translations of the Bible.
  - March – The city police force of 120 archers and sixty arbaletriers is reinforced with one hundred arquebusiers,
  - 8 August – The Augustine monk Jean Vallière is burned at the stake for proclaiming that Jesus Christ was born like other humans.
- 1527
  - 15 March – Letters of patent issued to construct the quai du Louvre.
- 1528
  - King François I begins construction of a large hunting lodge, the Château de Madrid, in the Bois de Boulogne.
  - 28 February – In order to turn the Louvre into a palatial residence, demolition of its great central tower begins.
  - 15 March – François I formally announces that he plans to make Paris his principal residence.
- 1529
  - 19 August – Miles Regnault, secretary of the Bishop of Paris, who had converted to Lutheranism, is condemned and burned at the stake on the Place de Grève.
- 1530
  - March – François I founds the Collège des lecteurs royaux, or Collège de France, to offer lectures in subjects not taught at the College of Sorbonne, including Hebrew, Ancient Greek, and mathematics.
- 1531
  - December – New outbreak of bubonic plague. The Holy Innocents' Cemetery is completely filled, so a new cemetery for plague victims is created on the plain of Grenelle, facing the hill of Chaillot.
- 1532
  - 19 August – First stone placed for the new Saint-Eustache church, not finished until 1637.
  - 22 December – The architect Domenico da Cortona presents his plan for the new Hôtel de Ville. The cornerstone is laid on 15 July 1533.
- 1533
  - April – The Ordinance of Fontainebleau orders the demolition of the gates on the right bank of the wall built by Philippe-Auguste.
  - 1 November – At the opening of the academic year, the rector of the university, Nicolas Cop, causes a scandal by giving a lecture inspired by Jean Calvin.
- 1534
  - 15 August – Ignace de Loyola and his followers take an oath at the base of Montmartre to defend the Church and Pope. This is the founding of the Jesuit order.
  - 17–18 October – Calvinists put up anti catholic posters in the streets of Paris and several towns in France, including on the door of king François Ier's bedroom in Amboise. The Parliament of Paris orders the arrest of two hundred suspected Calvinists, six of whom are burned on the night of 18 October, and many others before the end of the year.
  - 17 November – The printer Antoine Augerau becomes the first printer to be burned at the stake, at Place Maubert, for publishing a book criticizing the sister of the King, Marguerite de Navarre, for her alleged sins.
- 1535
  - 23 January – First woman heretic, Marie la Catelle, a schoolteacher, burned at the stake for reading the New Testament in French to her pupils.
  - 15 February – The printer Etienne de La Forge is burned at the stake for printing copies of the New Testament and distributing them to the poor.
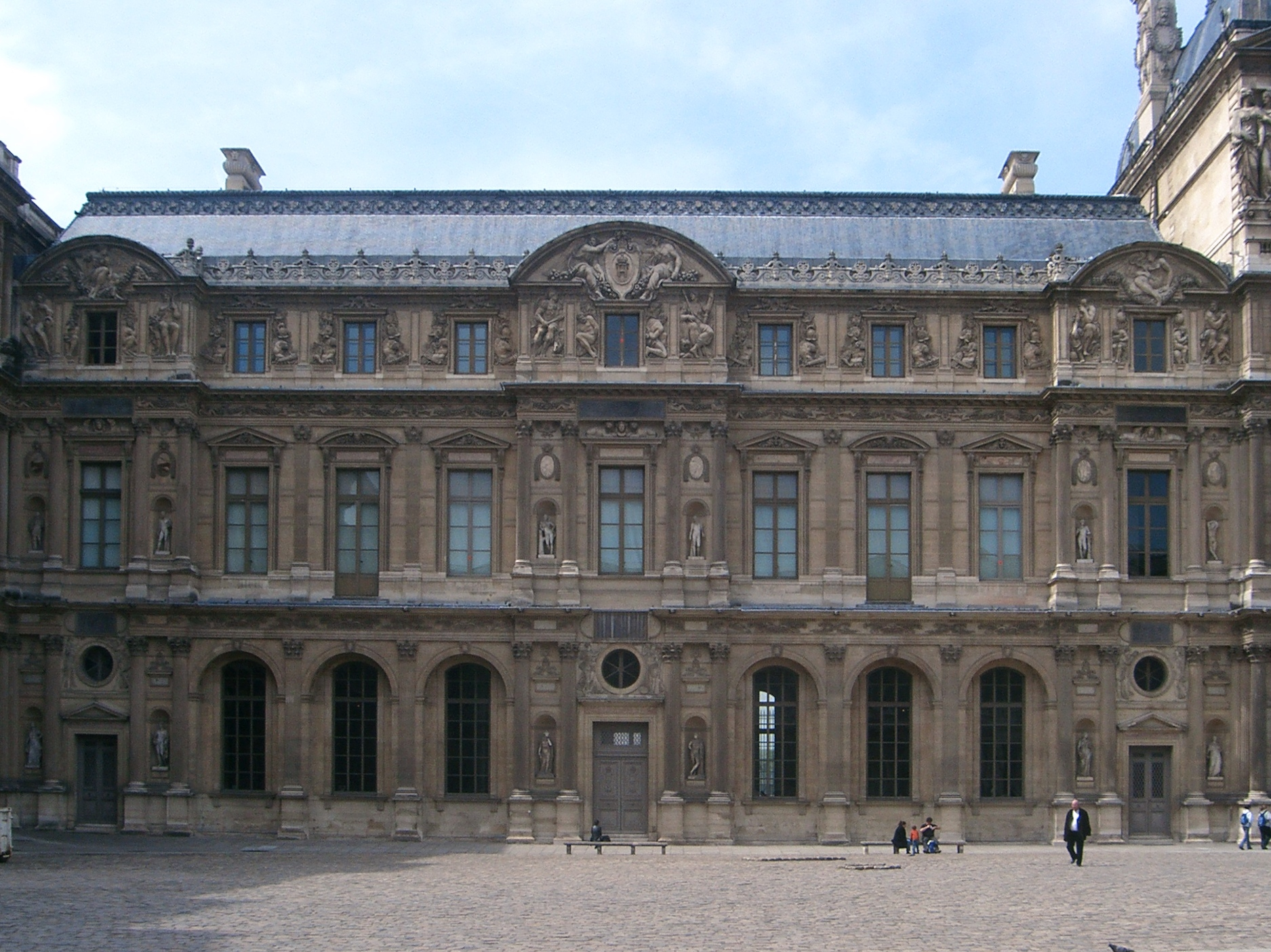
    The Lescot wing in the Cour Carrée, the oldest existing façade of the Louvre Palace is begun in 1546
- 1540
  - 1 January – Charles V, Holy Roman Emperor is welcomed to Paris with a solemn ceremony.
- 1544
  - 19 August – The Sorbonne publishes the first Index, or list of forbidden books.
  - 7 November – François I creates the Grand Bureau des Pauvres, responsible for assisting the indigent, beggars and vagabonds, under the authority of the Bureau de la Ville, or city administration.
- 1545
  - Construction begins of the Hôtel Carnavalet, now the Museum of the History of Paris.
- 1546
  - 2 August – Letters of patent from François I approve the reconstruction of the west wing of the Louvre, to be done by the architect Pierre Lescot with decoration by sculptor Jean Goujon.
  - 3 August – The printer Étienne Dolet is burned at the stake on Place Maubert. Two other printers are burned that summer, Michel Vincent (19 August) and Pierre Gresteau (13 September).
- 1547
  - 31 March – Death of King François I, who is succeeded by his son, Henry II.
  - 22 April – For the first time, a large shipment of firewood is made by floating the logs down the river in a raft from the Nivernais region to Paris.
  - 8 October – The Parlement de Paris creates a commission, called the Chambre ardente, to prosecute Protestants.
  - December – The pont Saint-Michel is wrecked by the collision of a boat. The architect Philibert Delorme is commissioned to build a new bridge.
- 1548
  - 30 August – Inauguration of a new theater next to the Hôtel de Bourgogne used to present religious dramas and comedies by a troupe called Les Confrères de la Passion. This was the first theatre in the city.
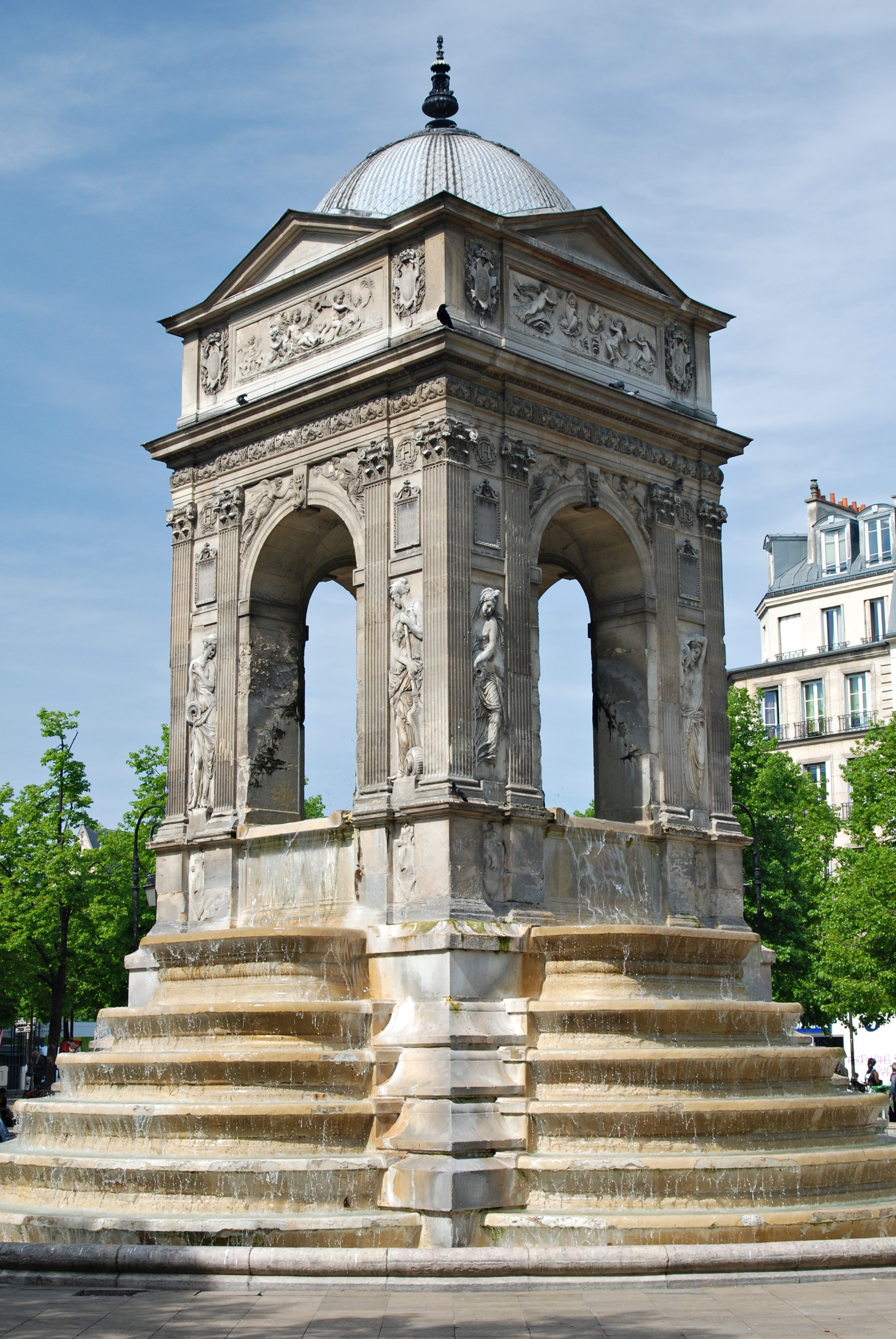
    The Fontaine des Innocents (1549), the oldest existing fountain in Paris
- 1549
  - 16 June – Inauguration of the Fontaine des Innocents, the oldest existing fountain in Paris, with decoration by Jean Goujon.
- 1550
  - 8 September – King Henry II signs letters of patent to build a new wall around the faubourgs of the left bank.
- 1552
  - 4 January – Architect Pierre Lescot receives the contract to rebuild the Petit Pont.
- 1553
  - Introduction of frozen sorbets to Paris by Italian limonadiers, or lemonade-makers.
  - February – First performance of a French tragedy, Cléopâtre captive, by Étienne Jodelle. Henry II attends the performance.
- 1554
  - 7 February – The Parliament of Paris forbids secret schools which provide religious instruction.
  - 12 July – First stone placed for a new city gate, called the Porte Neuve and then the Porte de la Conférence, at the western edge of the Jardin des Tuileries.
- 1557
  - 11 August – Many Parisians flee the city after a Spanish army advancing from Flanders defeats the French at Saint-Quentin. Queen Catherine de' Medici remains in the city and helps re-establish confidence.
- 1558
  - 13 May – Gathering of thousands of Protestants at the Pré-aux-Clercs for an open-air service, despite threats from the city authorities.

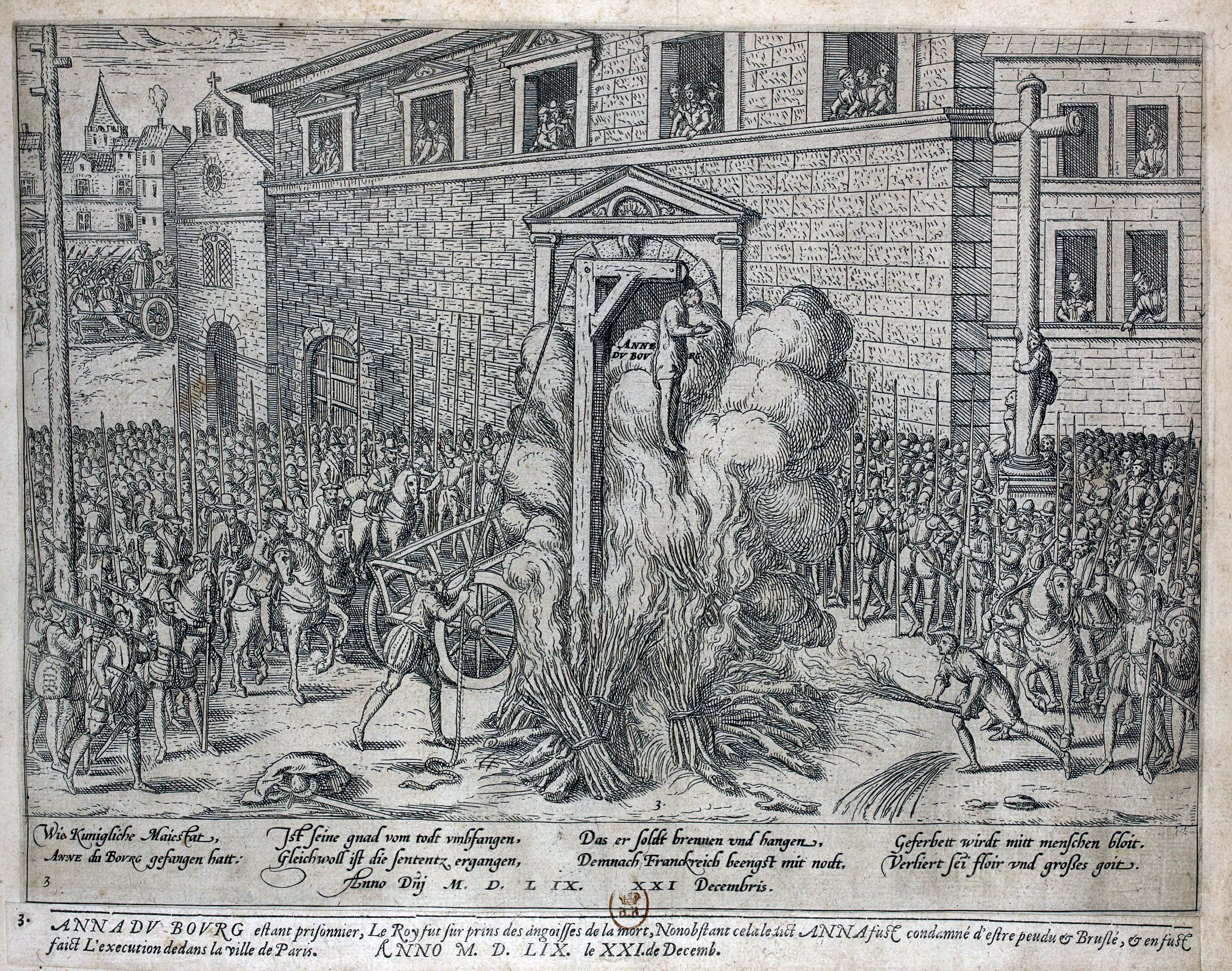
Burning at the stake, after hanging, of Anne du Bourg, member of the Paris Parliament, for heresy (23 December 1559)

- 1559
  - 25 May – First synod of Calvinists on rue des Marais (now rue Visconti) formally establishes the Reformed Church of France on 29 May.
  - 10 June – The Parliament of Paris debates new royal edicts prohibiting the Protestant church. Henry II personally attends the session, and the members calling for tolerance are arrested.
  - 30 June – During the celebrations of the marriages of the sister and daughter of King Henry II on rue Saint-Antoine, Henry II is mortally wounded in the eye by a lance carried by the commander of his Scottish guard, Gabriel de Montgomery. He dies on 10 July and his young and sickly son François II succeeds him.
  - 23 December – Anne du Bourg, a member of the Parliament of Paris and Catholic defender of tolerance for Protestants, is first hung and then burned at the stake for opposing the King's views.
- 1560
  - 5 December – On the death of François II, his ten-year-old brother Charles IX succeeds him.
- 1561
  - 29 December – the "Tumulte" of Saint-Médard. Catholics attack Protestants conducting a service at the maison du Patriarche, near the church of Saint-Médard. The building where the service was held is burned the next day.
- 1562
  - 4 April – The connétable de Montmorency orders the burning of the chairs and pews of the Protestant temples of Popincourt and Jerusalem.
- 1563
  - 2 July – Opening by the Jesuits of the Collége de Clermont, today Lycée Louis-le-Grand.
  - November – A royal edict creates the tribunal des juges consuls, ancestor of the modern Tribunal de Commerce. It meets in the Abbaye de Saint-Magloire on rue Saint-Denis (at the site of today's number 82).
- 1564
  - Construction begins of the Tuileries Palace for Catherine de' Medici, widow of Henry II. The edifice is designed by Philibert Delorme.
  - 14 July – A royal ordinance modifies how municipal elections are conducted; under the new rules, the cities present the King with two lists of candidates, and the King decides.
- 1565
  - 9 March – New regulations for the façades of houses: wooden decoration must be replaced by cut stone or plaster.
  - 1 August – Decision taken to build a quay along the river at what is now Chaillot.
- 1566
  - Creation of the Marché Neuf, or new market, at the west end of the Petit-Pont and beginning of the construction of the Quai de Gloriette.
  - 12 July – construction begins of a new city wall on the west, which includes the Tuileries Palace and the gardens of the Tuileries.
- 1568
  - City militia reorganized into neighborhood companies commanded by captains; the companies of each quarter of the city are formed into columns commanded by colonels.
- 1569
  - 30 June – Several members of a wealthy Protestant family, the Gastines, are sentenced to death, and their house demolished and replaced by a cross to expiate their "sins".
- 1571
  - 6 March – The first troupe of Italian actors, called I Gelosi, arrives in Paris. After a few performances, they are banned by the Parliament of Paris.
- 1572

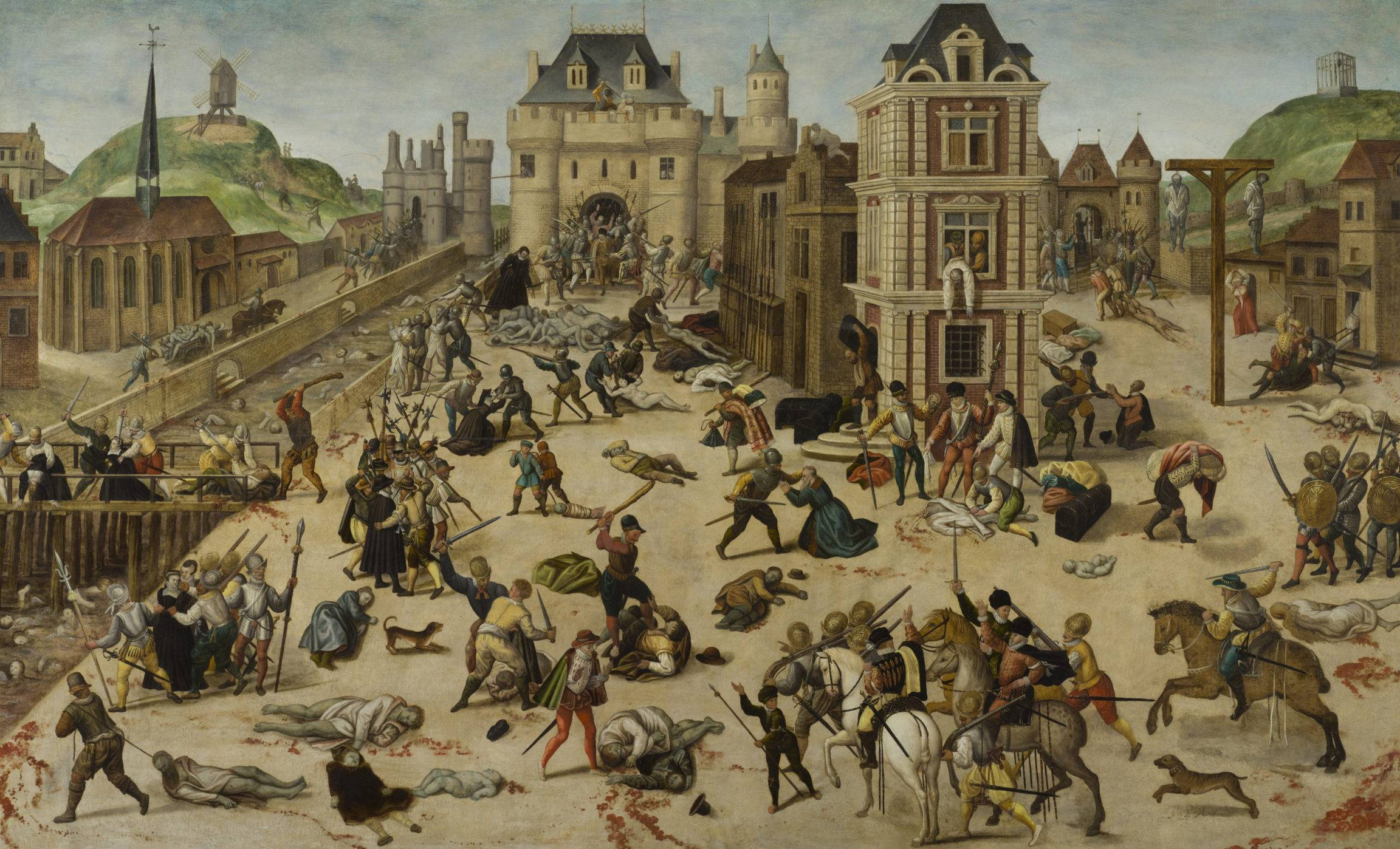
The St. Bartholomew's Day massacre (24–30 August 1572) Painting by François Dubois, a Huguenot painter born circa 1529. He depicts Admiral Coligny's body hanging out of a window at the rear to the right. To the left rear, Catherine de' Medici is shown emerging from the Louvre Palace to inspect a heap of bodies.

  - 15 August – Marriage of Henri de Bourbon, King Henry III of Navarre, with Marguerite de Valois, the sister of King Charles IX. The town is full of Protestants for the ceremony, and also with ultra-Catholics, led by Henry I, Duke of Guise.
  - 22 August – Admiral Gaspard II de Coligny, a prominent Protestant leader, is attacked and wounded on rue des Poulies, not far from the Louvre.
  - 24 August – At four o'clock in the morning, the bells of the church of Saint-Germain l'Auxerrois give the signal to begin the massacre of Protestants, known as the St. Bartholomew's Day massacre. The killing continues until August 30, and takes the lives of about two thousand Protestants in the city.
- 1573
  - The architect Jean Bullant begins construction of a new residence for Catherine de' Medici, the future Hôtel de Soissons, finished in 1584.
- 1574
  - 30 May – King Charles IX dies at the Château de Vincennes, and is succeeded by his brother Henry III.
- 1576
  - Founding by Nicolas Houel of the first school of pharmacy in France.
  - 19 June – First performance of the Italian theater troupe I Gelosi in the hall of the Petit-Bourbon, with great success.
- 1577
  - A commission is named to study projects for a new bridge over the Seine. On 15 February 1578, Henry III chooses the project for a bridge across the western end of the Île-de-la-Cité, the future Pont Neuf.
- 1578
  - 31 May – Henry III places the first stone of the Pont Neuf ("new bridge").
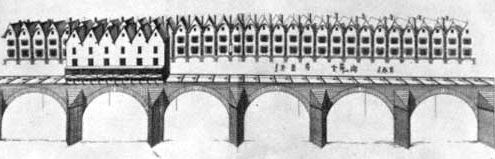
    The pont Notre-Dame in 1576 (engraving by Jean Baptiste Androuet du Cerceau)
- 1581
  - 24 September – First performance of a ballet at the French court: Circé by Balthazar de Beaujoyeux, performed at the Louvre.
- 1582
  - The Gregorian calendar is introduced in Paris, with the elimination of ten days; 9 December is followed by 20 December.
- 1587
  - The teaching of Arabic is introduced at the Collège de France.
- 1588
  - 9 May – Henry I, Duke of Guise, leader of the ultra-Catholic faction, makes a triumphal entry into Paris, cheered by the Parisians.
  - 12 May – Day of the Barricades. The Duke of Guise leads an insurrection against Henry III. The King flees Paris for the Loire Valley on 13 May.
  - 18–20 May – the Holy League, the Catholic party, takes charge of the administration of Paris. The Duke of Guise is named lieutenant-general of the armies.
  - 25 December – After the murder of the Duke of Guise and Louis II, Cardinal de Guise at the Château de Blois, the Sorbonne declares that the French owe no more allegiance to King Henry III. A new city council of forty members, dominated by supporters of the Holy League, is chosen.
- 1589
  - 13 March – The league proclaims the cardinal de Bourbon is the new king, under the name Charles X.
  - 1 August – Henry III is murdered at the Château de Saint-Cloud by a Dominican friar, Jacques Clément.
  - 2 August – Henry III of Navarre becomes Henry IV, king of France,
  - 1 November Henry IV tries to capture Paris by a surprise attack on the walls around the left bank, but fails.
- 1590
  - 7 May – Henry IV attacks the city again, this time at the faubourgs Saint-Denis and Saint-Martin, but the attack fails.
  - 14 May – The Catholic League holds a large procession in the city to keep up the morale of the catholic Parisians.
  - 8 August – Popular revolt within Paris against the Catholic League, demanding either bread or peace. The rebellion is harshly suppressed.
  - 10–11 September – Night attack on the city by Henry IV between the gates of Saint-Jacques and Saint-Marcel. The attack is unsuccessful. Henry IV lifts the siege when he learns that a Spanish army is approaching to aid the Catholic League.
- 1591
  - 2 September – The ruling council of the Catholic League, called the Seize ("Sixteen"), offers the crown of France to Philip II of Spain.
  - 15 November – Growing tensions between the Seize and the Parliament of Paris. Three leaders of Parliament are arrested, tried and hanged.
  - 4 December – The Seize are arrested by Charles de Mayenne, military commander of the Catholic League, and four members are hung at the Louvre. Growing discontent in Paris against the league.

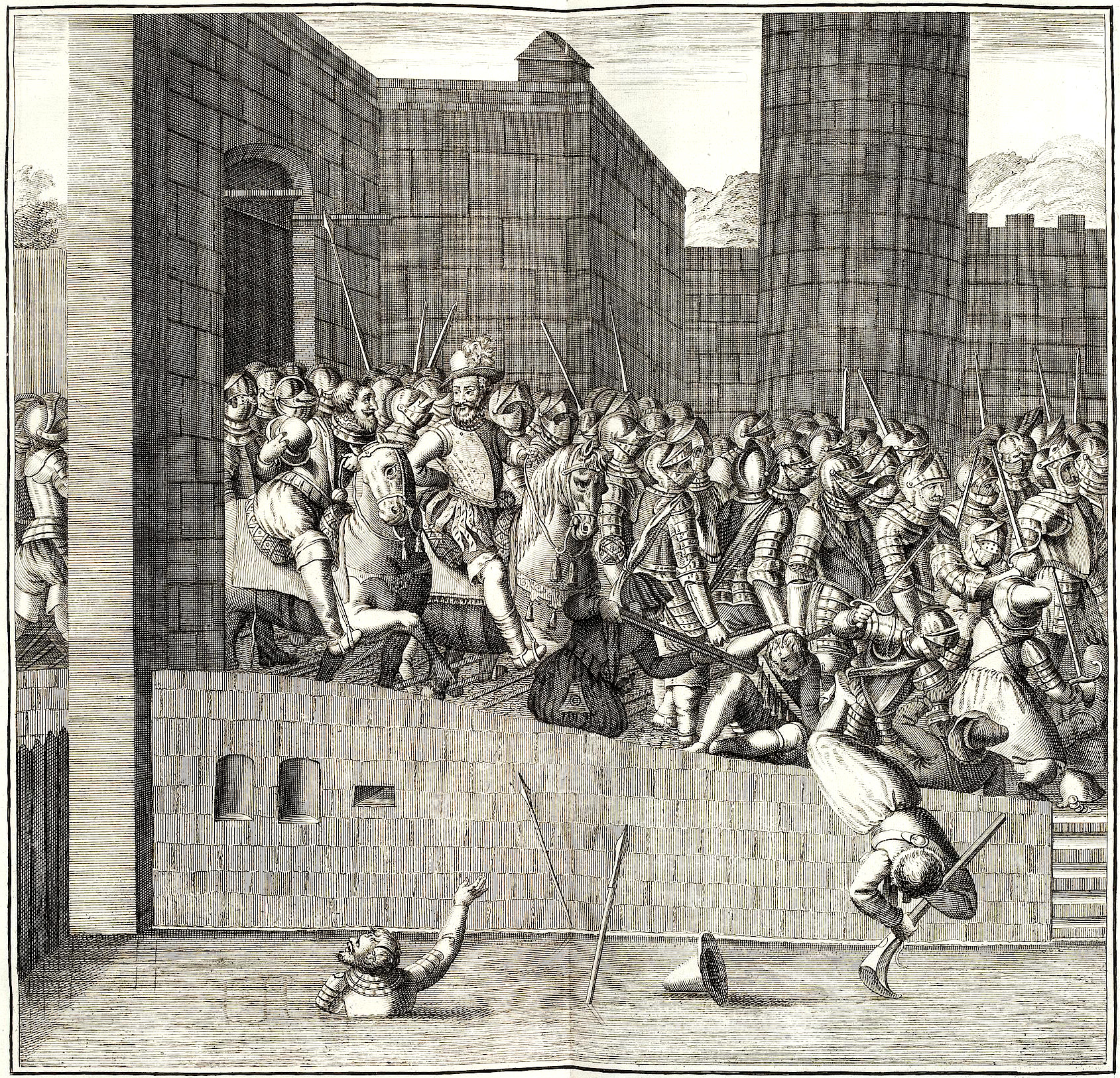
Henry IV enters Paris (March 22, 1594)

- 1593
  - 16 May – Henry IV announces that he will give up the Protestant faith.
  - 25 July – Henry IV formally converts to Catholicism in the Basilica of St Denis.
- 1595
  - 9 January – Surveying begins for a new (southern) wing of Louvre, on the side of the Seine river, the galerie du bord-de-l'eau, to connect the Louvre with the Tuileries Palace.
  - 14 March – The Catholic League's governor of Paris, the comte de Brissac, agrees to surrender the city to Henry IV in exchange for money and the promise of the title of maréchal.
  - 22 March – The gates of Paris are opened to the army of Henry IV.
  - 24 March – Henry IV enters the city, and is welcomed by a cheering crowd.
  - 12 May – Expulsion of the Jesuits from the city, declared "enemies of the State," by the Parliament of Paris and the rector of the university.
- 1596
  - 23 December – The pont aux Meuniers collapses. It is replaced in 1609 by the pont Marchand.
- 1598
  - 13 April – The Edict of Nantes brings an end to the wars of religion. Protestant temples are banned inside Paris and within five leagues of the city. The first Protestant temples open at Grigny, then at Ablon.

== 17th century ==
=== The Paris of Henry IV and Louis XIII ===
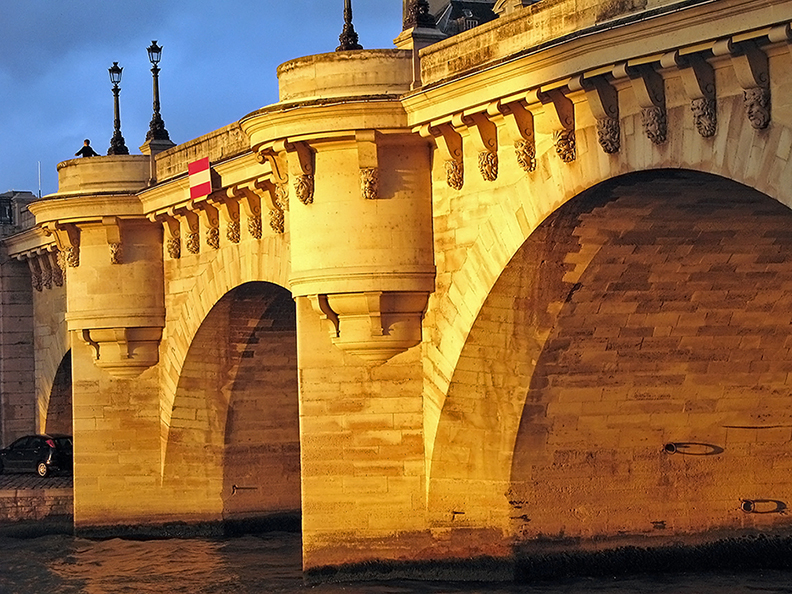
King Henry IV crosses the Pont Neuf to inaugurate the bridge, (20 June 1603).

- 1600
  - 28 September – New statutes of the University of Paris published which increase royal authority and reduce power of students.
- 1602
  - Tapestry weavers from Brussels introduce Flemish techniques at what later became the Gobelins Manufactory.
  - 2 January – Construction begins La Samaritaine, a giant pump, located at the Pont Neuf, to raise drinking water from the Seine and to irrigate the Tuileries gardens. It began working 3 October 1608. A department store of the same name is built next to the site of the pump in the 19th century.
  - 12 November – Maximilien de Béthune, Duke of Sully becomes superintendent of buildings to Henry IV, and is put in charge of the works of the Louvre and Tuileries Palace.
- 1603
  - 20 June – King Henry IV crosses the Pont Neuf to inaugurate the bridge, though work is not finished until July 1606. It is the first Paris bridge with sidewalks and without buildings
- 1604
  - 29 June – Convent of the Capucines founded on rue Saint-Honoré.
- 1605

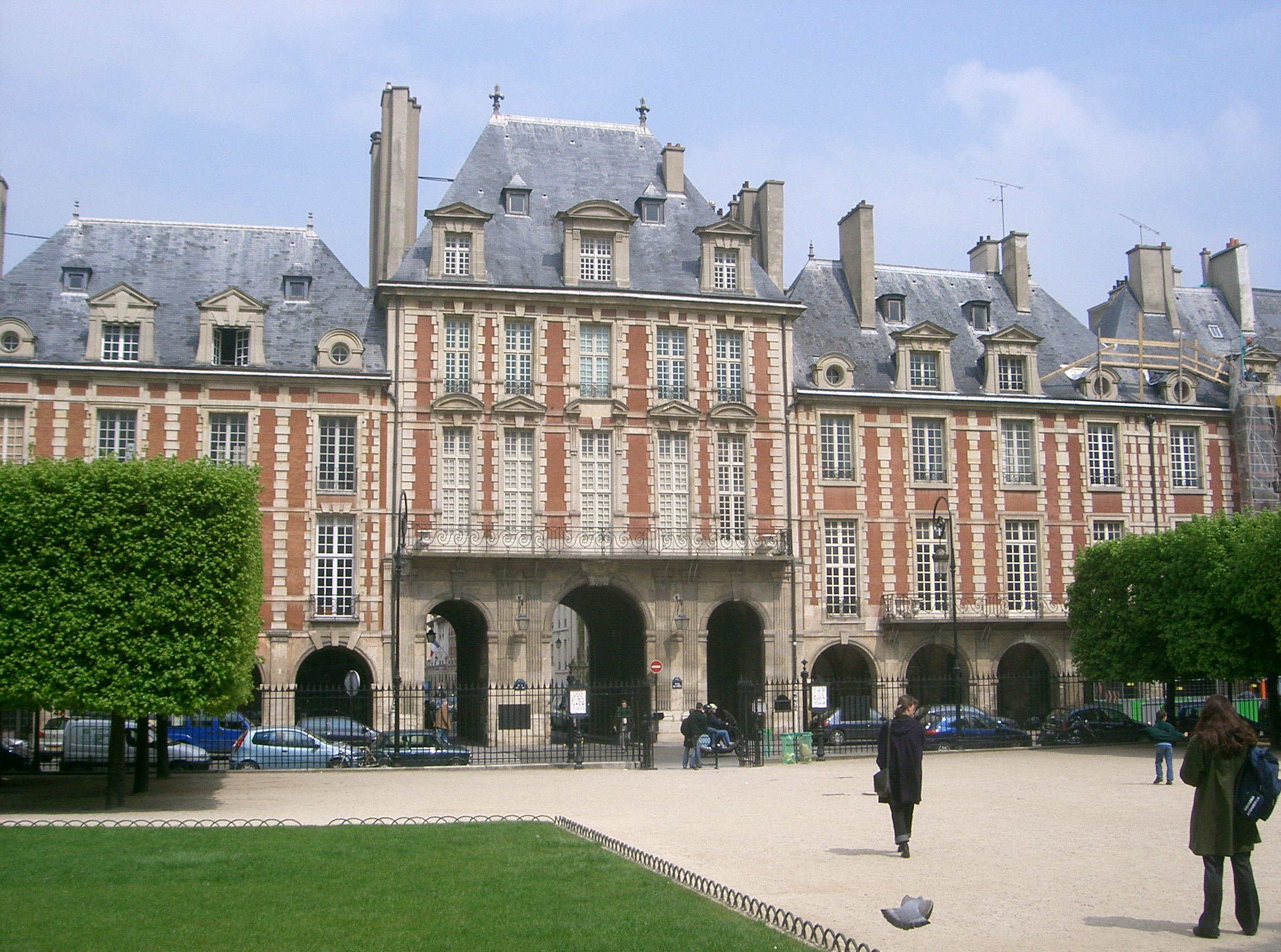
Building of the Place Royale approved by king Henry IV (1605).

  - City Hall rebuilt.
  - July – Henry IV signs letters patent ordering construction of Place Royale (now Place des Vosges), the first residential square in Paris, on the site of the former park of the royal Hôtel des Tournelles. It is completed in 1612.
- 1606
  - 1 August – Royal authorization given to build a Protestant church at Charenton.
  - Workshop created within the Louvre to make tapestries of silk, "in the Persian and Turkish fashion".
- 1607
  - 6 February – Opening of rue Dauphine, followed shortly by rue Christine and rue d'Anjou Dauphine (now Rue de Nesle), in honor of Henry IV's third son, Gaston de France, the Dauphin, bearing the title of duc d'Anjou.
  - 28 May – Approval given for creation of Place Dauphine, on the site of the old royal gardens on Île de la Cité.
- 1608
  - 1 January – Inauguration of the galerie du bord-de-l'eau of the Louvre, connecting the Louvre with the Tuileries Palace.
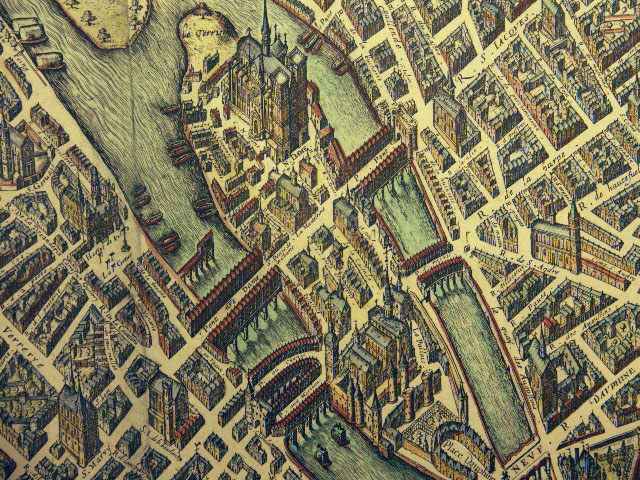
    The Île de la Cité, 1609 map of Paris by Vassalieu
- 1610
  - 14 May – Assassination of Henry IV by Ravaillac on Rue de la Ferronnerie, while the King's carriage is caught in a traffic jam.
  - 18 August – First stone placed of the Collège Royal, later the Collège de France.
- 1611
  - 18 September – Placing of the first stone for the Church of the Minimes on the Place Royale (later Place des Vosges).
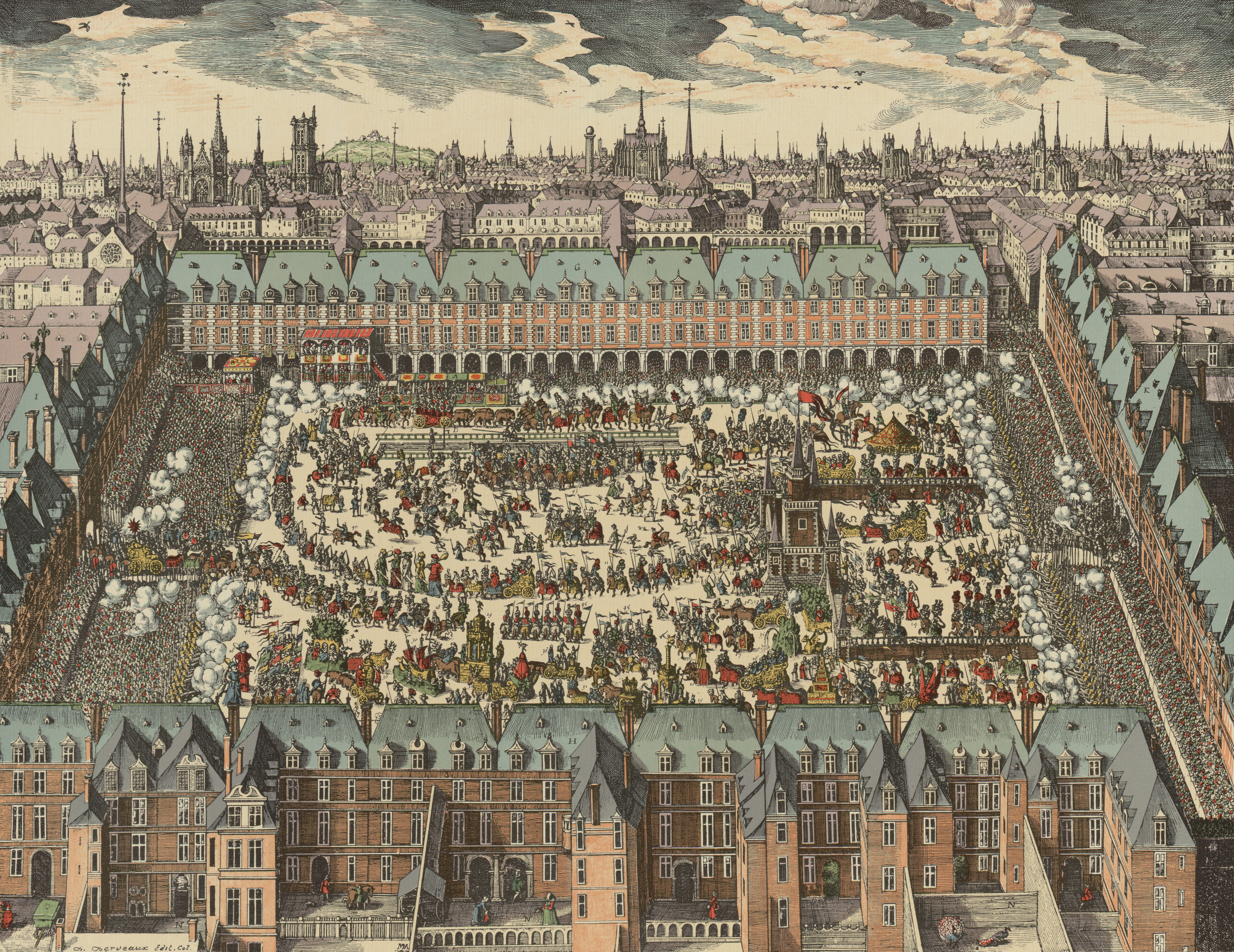
    The famous Carrousel Le roman des chevaliers de la gloire, a major celebration at the inauguration of the Place Royale, now Place des Vosges, (1612). (Oil on wood, Polish school, 17th century, Carnavalet museum, Paris.)
- 1612
  - 5–7 April – Celebration of the wedding contract between Louis XIII and Anne of Austria and inauguration of the Place Royale, with the famous Ballet équestre du Carrousel taking place within the Place Royale.
- 1614
  - 19 April – Contract signed to create the Île Saint-Louis by combining two small islands, the Île aux Vaches and Île Notre-Dame, and building a new bridge, the Pont Marie, to the Right Bank. The work was finished in 1635.
- 1615
  - 2 April – Construction begins of the Luxembourg Palace and gardens by Marie de' Medici, widow of Henry IV. It was completed in 1621.
- 1616
  - 30 January – A major flood washes away the Pont Saint-Michel and damages the Pont aux Changeurs.
  - 24 July – King Louis XIII places the first stone of the façade of the church of Saint-Gervais. Work of the architect Salomon de Brosse, the façade was finished in 1621.
  - 24 April – Concini, Minister of King Louis XIII and favorite the Queen Mother, Marie de' Medici, is murdered on the entry bridge of the Louvre, probably on Louis XIII's orders; Marie de' Medici is exiled to Blois.
- 1617
  - 22 October – Letters of patent given for three companies of chair bearers, the first organized public transport within the city.
- 1618
  - June – Authority over printers, bookbinders and book stores is transferred from the Church to secular authorities.
- 1619
  - 27 July – first stone placed for the convent of the Trinity of the order of the reformed Petits Augustins, on the site of the modern École des beaux-arts.
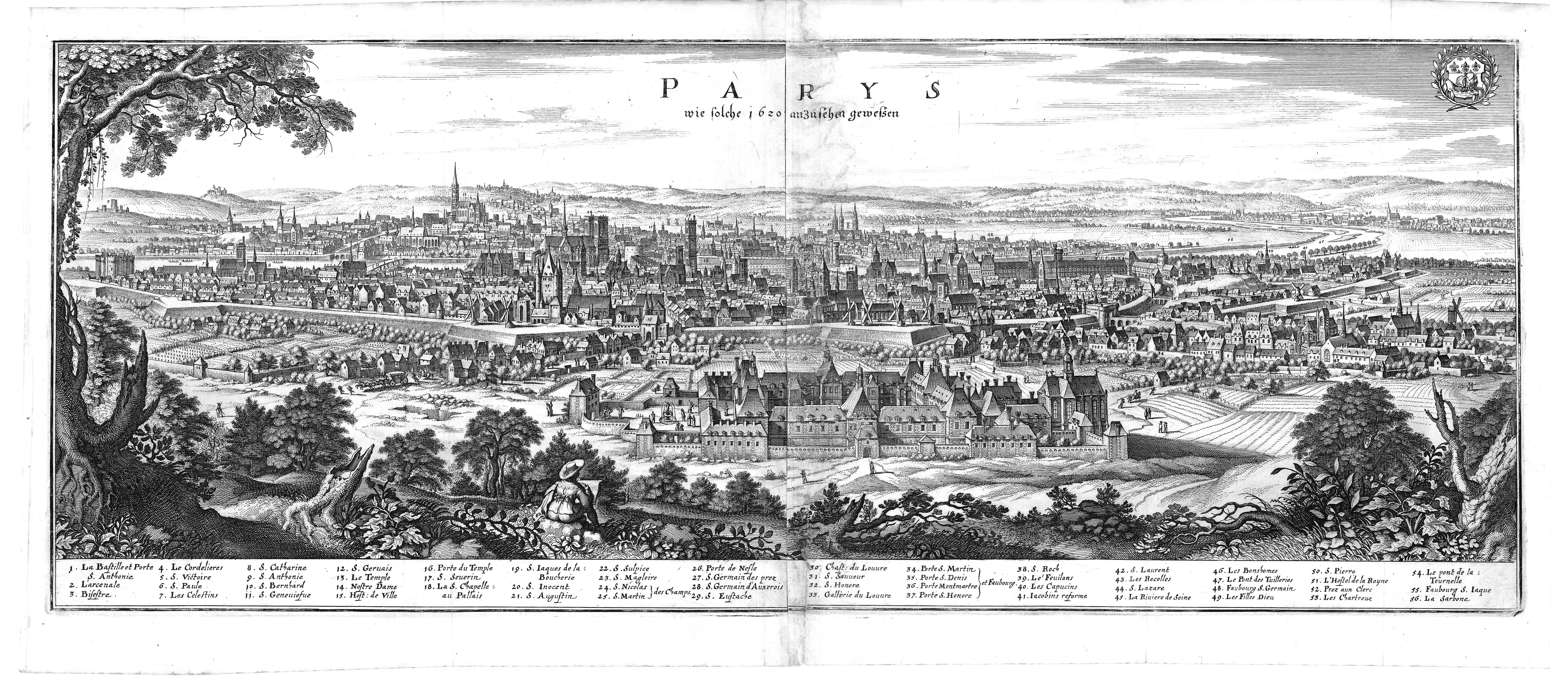
    view of Paris in 1620, by Matthäus Merian
- 1620
  - Opening of the first Pont de la Tournelle, made of wood. The bridge was destroyed by blocks of ice floating on the river in 1637 and 1651 and rebuilt in stone in 1654.
- 1621
  - 26 September – The Protestant temple at Charenton is burned by a Catholic mob, after the news of the death of Henry of Lorraine, Duke of Mayenne fighting the Protestants in the unsuccessful Siege of Montauban.
  - 23 October – Both the Pont Marchand and the Pont au Change are burned; the Protestants are blamed.
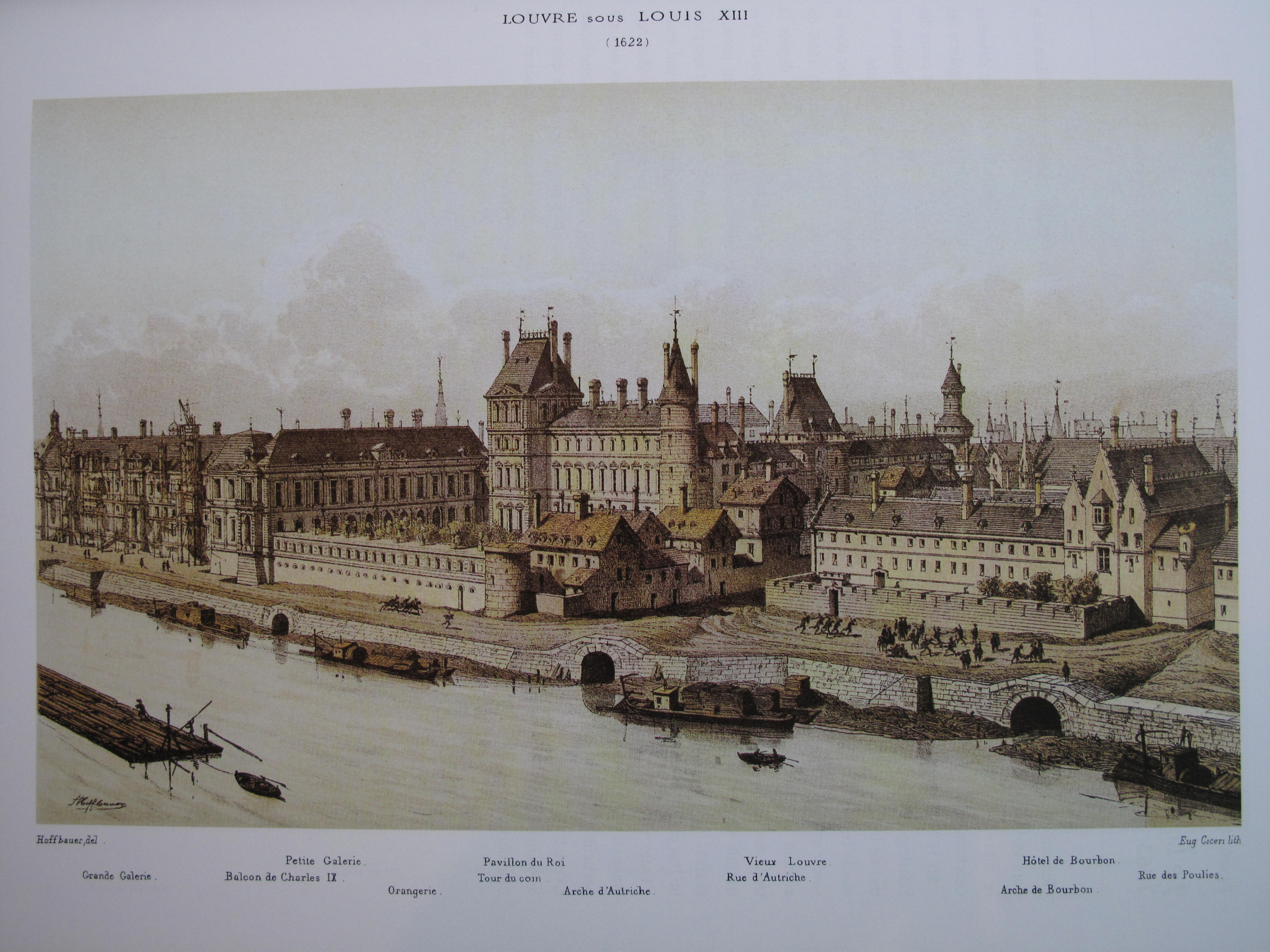
    View of the Louvre Palace in 1622, reconstruction by Hoffbauer
    .
- 1622
  - A windmill, called the moulin du palais, is built atop Montmartre. In the 19th century, it is renamed the Moulin de la galette (it became a famous landmark in the 19th century).
  - 2 September – Cardinal Richelieu becomes the proviseur, or dean, of the Sorbonne.
  - 22 October – For centuries, the bishop of Paris was under the authority of the archbishop of Sens. On this date Paris was given its own archbishop, and the Roman Catholic Archdiocese of Paris established.
- 1623
  - 19 May – First water arrives from Arcueil, in a new channel following the route of the ancient Roman aqueduct, at the new reservoir on rue d'Enfer, near the present Observatory.
- 1624
  - Construction begins of the church of Notre-Dame de Bonne-Nouvelle.
  - 24 April – First stone placed for the Pavillon de l'Horloge of the Louvre Palace.
  - 31 July – Anne of Austria lays the first stone of the monastery of Val-de-Grâce, on the site of the modern hospital of that name.
- 1625
  - 17 April – Saint Vincent de Paul founds the Congregation of the Mission charitable community of monks.
- 1626
  - Construction of the Pont au Double to connect the right bank with the Hôtel-Dieu hospital on the Île-de-la-Cité.
  - January – Royal decree establishes the Jardin royal des plantes médicinales, future Jardin des Plantes, though the site is not specified.
  - February – Royal edict forbids duels.
  - 25 February – Consecration of the church of Saint-Étienne-du-Mont, begun in 1492.
  - 25 April – Civil disturbances at Les Halles and at the cemetery of Saint-Jean caused by the high price of bread.
  - 1 December – Establishment of the first Lutheran church in Paris, a chapel at the Embassy of Sweden.
- 1627
  - 7 March – Louis XIII lays the first stone of the Jesuit church, Saint-Paul-Saint-Louis, on rue Saint-Antoine. Work was finished in 1641.
  - 29 July – A royal decree forbids construction outside the limits of the city.
- 1629
  - Construction begins of the Palais Richelieu, later to be renamed Palais-Cardinal, the new residence of Cardinal Richelieu, finished in 1636.
  - 9 December – Louis XIII lays the first stone of the church which in 1633 becomes the church of Notre-Dame-des-Victoires.
  - 29 December – The theater troupe known as the Comédiens du Roi is given permission to perform plays at the hôtel de Bourgogne
- 1630
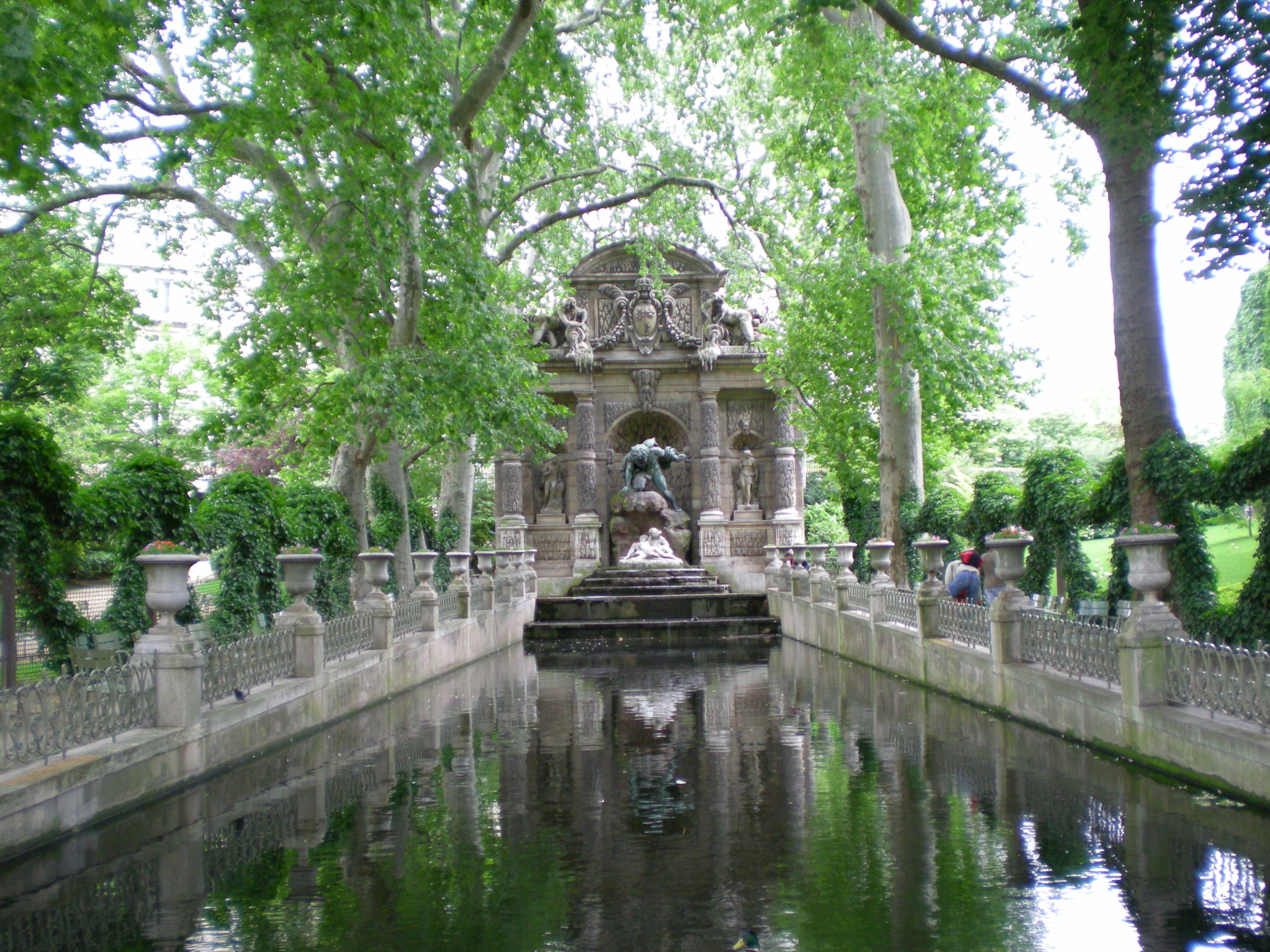
  The Medici Fountain completed in the gardens of the Luxembourg Palace (about 1630)
  - Construction of the pont Saint-Landry between the Île-de-la-Cité and the recently created Île-Saint-Louis.
- 1631
  - 30 May – First issue of La Gazette de France, the first weekly magazine in France, published by Théophraste Renaudot. Published every Friday, its last issue was on 30 September 1915.
  - 9 October – Contract to build a new wall around the city, reinforced with bastions. Work continued until 1647.
- 1632
  - Construction of the pont Rouge (also known as the pont Barbier) to replace the old bac (ferry). In 1689, the bridge was rebuilt of stone, and named the Pont Royal.
- 1633
  - 21 March – The state buys land in the faubourg Saint-Victor to create the future Jardin des plantes.
  - 23 November – the State Council approves the construction of new defenses to protect the Faubourg Saint-Honoré, Montmartre and Villeneuve. They were completed in 1636.
- 1634
  - 13 March – First meeting of the Académie française. The academy was formally established by letters of patent on 27 January 1635.
  - 13 October – A corporation of the distillers and vendors of eau de vie is formed, breaking away from the corporation of vinegar-makers, due to the growing popularity of the beverage.
- 1634
  - Théâtre du Marais, also known as the Troupe de Montdory or the Troupe du Roi au Marais, founded in an unused tennis court on the Vieille Rue du Temple opposite the church of the Capuchins.
- 1635
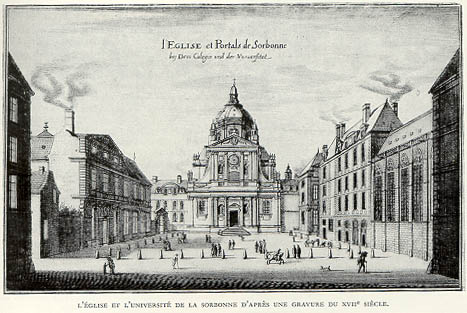
  the chapel of the College of Sorbonne, begun by Cardinal Richelieu in 1635.
  - 25 May Cardinal Richelieu begins construction of the new chapel of the College of Sorbonne, designed by Jean Mercier, and completed in 1642.
- 1636
  - 6 June – Cardinal Richelieu bequeathes his new residence to King Louis XIII; it becomes the Palais-Royal at his death in 1642.
  - August – Panic and flight of many from Paris caused by the invasion of the Spanish army into Picardy.
- 1637
  - January – Great success of Corneille's play Le Cid, given by the Troupe du Roi au Marais
  - 26 April – Consecration of the church of Saint-Eustache.
- 1638
  - 15 January – The Royal Council orders the placing of thirty-one stones to mark the edges of the city; building beyond the stones without royal approval is forbidden. The stones are in place by 4 August.
- 1640
  - Founding of the Imprimerie royale, or royal printing house, within the Louvre.
  - Reconstruction of the Hôtel de Villeroy, by Nicolas V de Villeroy, later tutor of Louis XIV.
- 1641
  - 16 January – First permanent theater in Paris opens within the Palais-Royal.

=== The Paris of Louis XIV ===
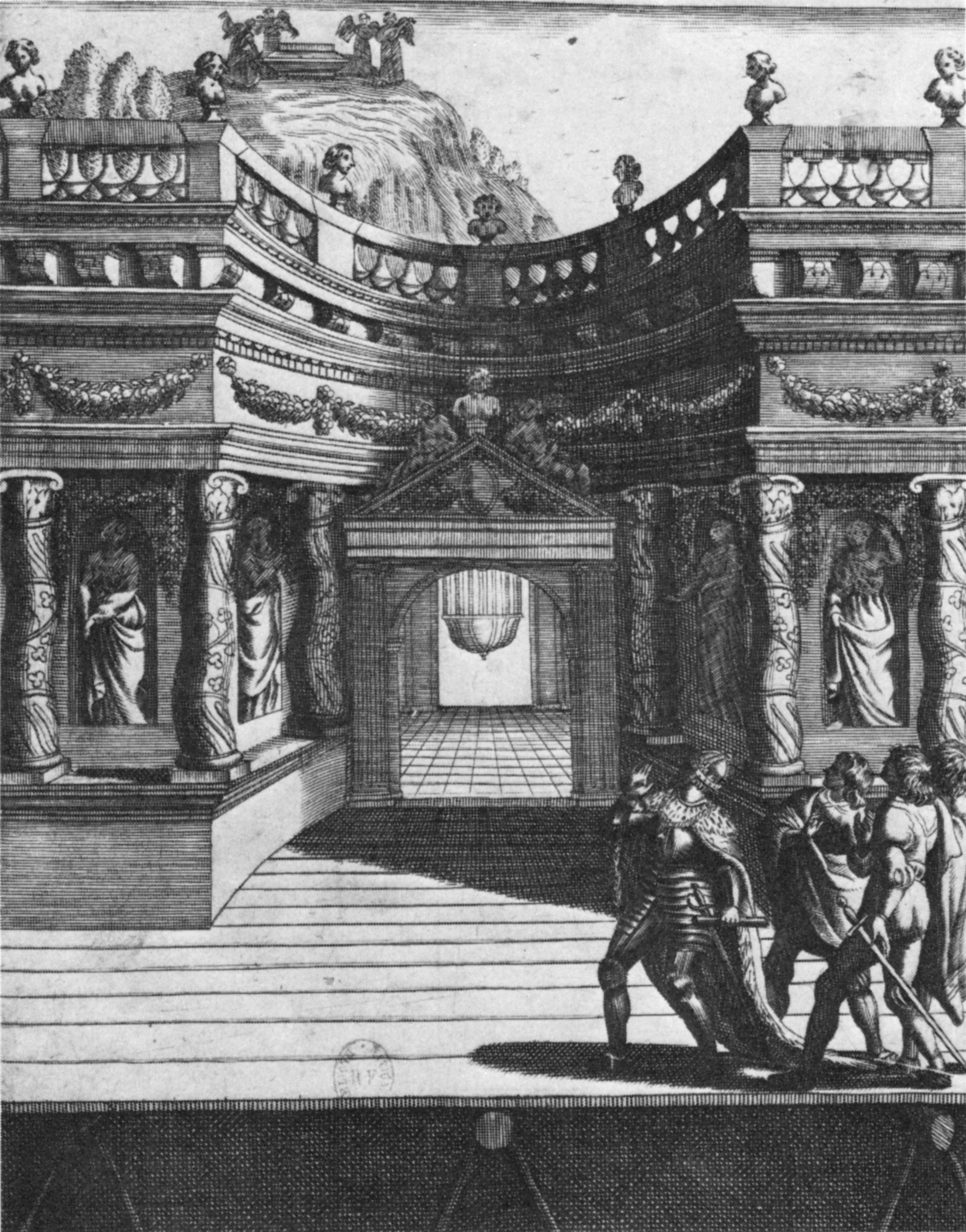
Theater production at the Hôtel de Bourgogne in 1643

- 1643
  - 14 May – Death of Louis XIII in Saint-Germain-en-Laye. Louis XIV, his four-and-a-half-year-old son, becomes king, under the regency of his mother, Anne of Austria, and the influence of Cardinal Mazarin.
  - 30 June – Molière, Madeleine Béjart and several others found the Illustre Théâtre on rue de la Perle, in the Marais.
  - 7 October – The young king and his court move from the Louvre to the Palais-Royal.
  - First coffee house or café opens in Paris, but is not profitable and closes. The first successful café does not arrive until 1672.
  - 11 October – Cardinal Mazarin moves into the Hôtel Tubeuf on rue des Petits-Champs, next to the Palais-Royal, and opens his personal library to scholars. In 1682, he donated his library to the Collège des Quatre-Nations, where it remains today as the Bibliothèque Mazarine ("Mazarine Library").
- 1644
  - 1 January – The theater company of Molière and Madeleine Béjart begins performing in the tennis court of Mestayers (jeu de paume des Mestayers). Molière goes deeply into debt to support the company, and is imprisoned in August 1645 in the Grand Châtelet.
- 1645
  - 28 February – First performance of an opera in Paris, La Finita Panza by Marco Marazzoli, in the hall of the Palais-Royal.
- 1646
  - 20 February – Construction begins of the church of Saint-Sulpice, not completed until 1788.
- 1647
  - Pont au Change rebuilt by architect Androuet du Cerceau.
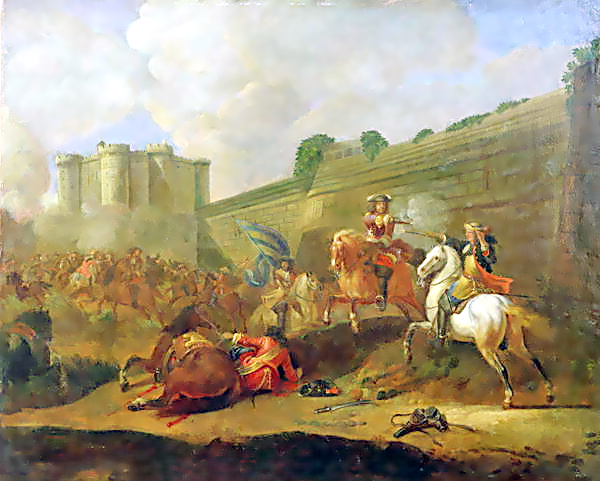
    Battle of Paris between the soldiers of king Louis XIV and the men of the Fronde, (2 July 1652). Anonymous, (Château de Versailles)
- 1648
  - 27 January – Académie royale de peinture et de sculpture founded by Charles Le Brun and Eustache Le Sueur.
  - 26 August – Cardinal Mazarin has the leaders of the Parlement, or law courts, of Paris arrested, because they have refused to enforce his edicts on fiscal policy and taxes. This begins the insurrection of Paris against the royal government known as the Fronde parlementaire (1648–1649).
  - 27 August – The Day of the Barricades. More than twelve hundred barricades erected in Paris against the royal authorities, and prisoners seized by Mazarin are liberated on the 29th.
  - 13 September – King Louis XIV, the Regent Queen Mother and Mazarin leave Paris for Rueil, then Saint-Germain-en-Laye. After negotiations with the Parlement, they accept the Parlement's propositions and return to Paris on 30 October.
- 1649
  - 5–6 January – The King and Queen Mother flee Paris again to Saint-Germain-en-Laye.
  - 11 January – The leaders of the Fronde take an oath to end the rule of Cardinal Mazarin. The royal army led by Condé, blockades Paris.
  - 14 January – A major flood inundates Paris; the Marais and faubourg Saint-Antoine, Saint-Germain, and Île Saint-Louis are under water.
  - 11 March – Under the Paix de Rueil, the King and court are allowed to return to Paris, in exchange for amnesty for the Frondeurs.
  - 19 September – City hall runs out of funds. City workers go unpaid, and riots break out sporadically through the end of year.
  - 27 August – The Day of the Barricades. More than twelve hundred barricades erected in Paris streets against the royal authorities, and prisoners seized by Mazarin are liberated on the 29th.
  - 13 September – The King, Queen Mother and Mazarin leave Paris for Rueil, then Saint-Germain-en-Laye. After negotiations with the Parlement, they accept its propositions and return to Paris on 30 October.
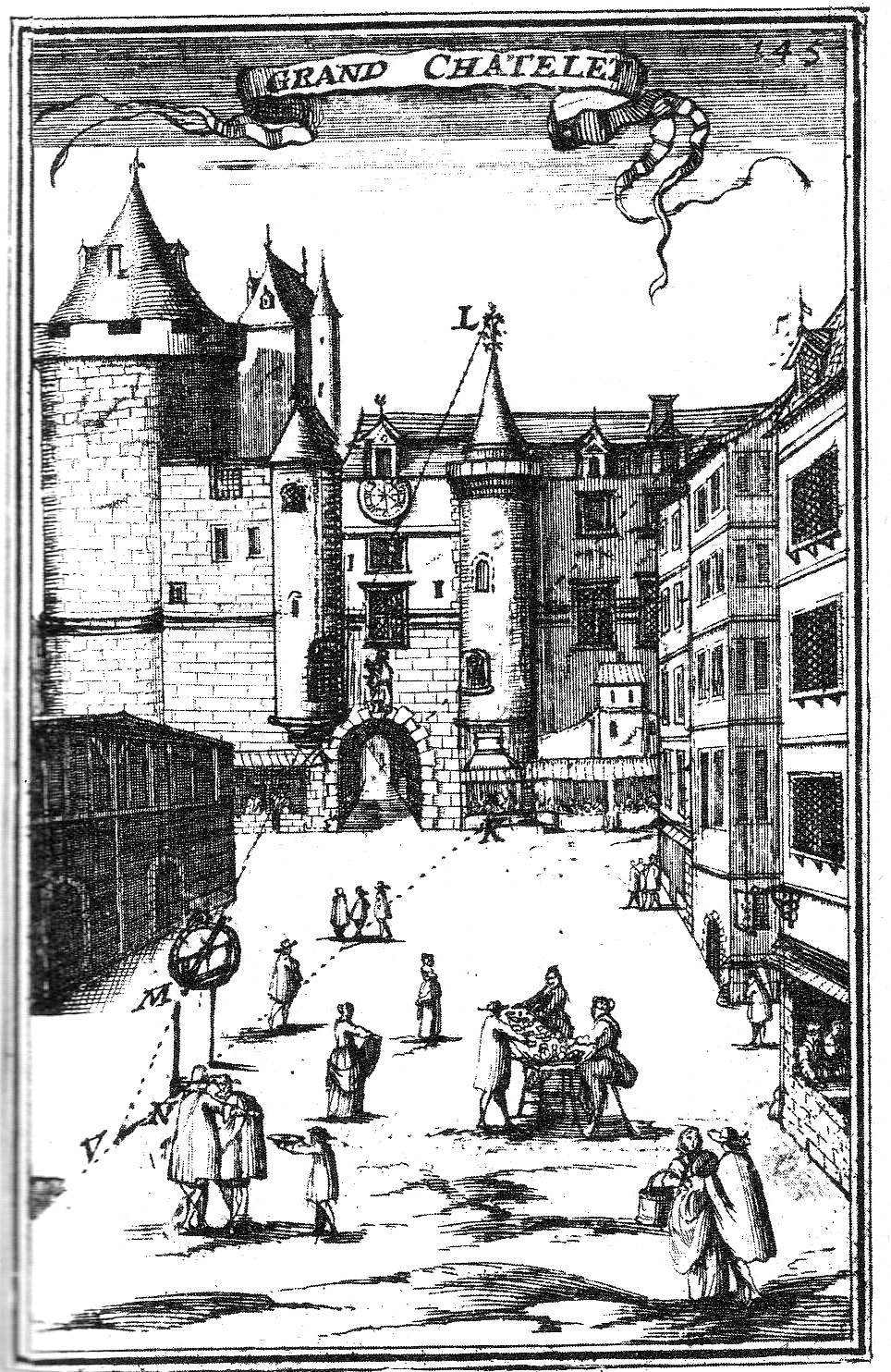
    The tower of the Grand Châtelet in 1650
- 1650
  - Mineral springs discovered at Passy, at the present-day rue des Eaux. The mineral baths there remain fashionable until the end of the 19th century.
  - 18 January – Mazarin orders the arrest of Louis de Bourbon, Prince of Condé, le Grand Condé, who has turned against the government, and of the Fronde of the Parlement.
- 1651
  - 21 January – A flood carries away half of the Pont de la Tournelle and one arch of the Pont au Change.
  - 30 January – The Fronde of the princes (Fronde des Princes, 1650–1653), led by Condé, and Fronde of the Paris Parlement join against Mazarin.
  - 6–7 January – Cardinal Mazarin flees from Paris.
- 1652
  - 11 April – Condé, leader of the Fronde of princes, enters Paris, pursued by the royal army.
  - 2 July – The Battle of Paris. The royal army, led by Turenne, defeats the army of Condé outside the city; Condé and his men take refuge inside the city walls.
  - 4 July – Soldiers of Condé lay siege to the Hôtel de Ville to force the Parlement to join the Fronde of the princes.
  - 13 October – The Parlement sends a delegation to Mazarin and the King at Saint-Germain-en Laye, asking for peace.
  - 14 October – The Fronde collapses, and Condé flees the city.
  - 21 October – Louis XIV and his court return in triumph to Paris, and take up residence in the Louvre.
  - 22 October – An amnesty is proclaimed for the Fronde participants, except for its leaders.
- 1653
  - 3 February – Cardinal Mazarin returns to Paris. On 4 July, the leaders of Paris honor him with a banquet at the Hôtel de Ville and a fireworks show.
- 1656 – Hôpital général de Paris (prison) begins operating.
- 1658
  - 1 March – A historic flood of the Seine washes away the Pont Marie, even though it was built of stone. The water reaches an historic high of 8.81 meters, higher than the 8.50 meters during the 1910 floods.
  - 24 June – The theater troupe of Molière is given the privilege to perform before the King, a privilege earlier given to the troupe of the Hôtel de Bourgogne and the Comédiens italiens.
- 1659
  - 10 May – Molière and his troupe perform L'Étourdi at the Louvre. On 21 October, they perform Les Précieuses ridicules.
  - 28 November – Privilege of making and selling hot chocolate granted to David Chaillou, first valet de chambre of the Count of Soissons. This begins the fashion of drinking chocolate in Paris.
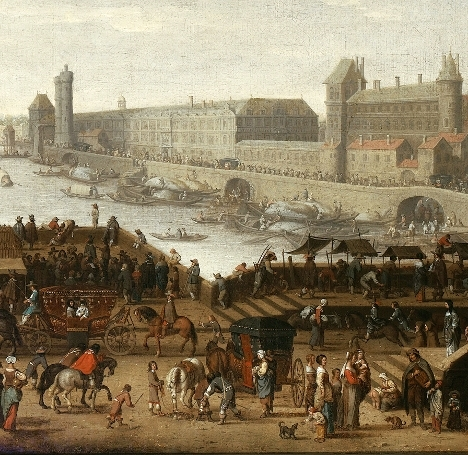
    The Louvre and the quay of the Seine in the 1660s
- 1660
  - Introduction of coffee in Paris. It had previously been served in Marseille in 1626, but did not become popular until 1669, during the visit to Paris of the first ambassador from the Turkish sultan.
  - 26 August – A new square, place du Trône (now Place de la Nation) is created on the east side of Paris for a ceremony to welcome Louis XIV and his new bride, Maria Theresa of Spain.
- 1661
  - 20 January – Theater company of Molière takes up residence at the Palais-Royal
  - 3–7 March – The will of Cardinal Mazarin endows the founding of the Collège des Quatre-Nations, to grant free education for sixty young nobles from the recently annexed provinces of Alsace, Pignerol, Artois and Roussillon. The architect Le Vau is selected to design the building.
- 1662
  - 14 February – Installation of the salle des machines, a hall for theater performances and spectacles, in the Tuileries.
  - March – Royal letters of patent give to Laudati de Caraffa the privilege of establishing stations of torch-bearers and lantern-bearers to escort people through the dark streets at night.
  - 18 March – First public transport line established of coaches running regularly between porte Saint-Antoine and Luxembourg. The service continues until 1677.
  - 30 March Académie royale de danse founded.
  - 5–6 June – A grand circular procession, or carrousel, gives its name to the open area where it is held, between the Louvre and the Tuileries Palace.
  - 6 June – The King purchases the Gobelins Manufactory of tapestries and places it under the direction of Charles Le Brun, court painter of King Louis XIV.

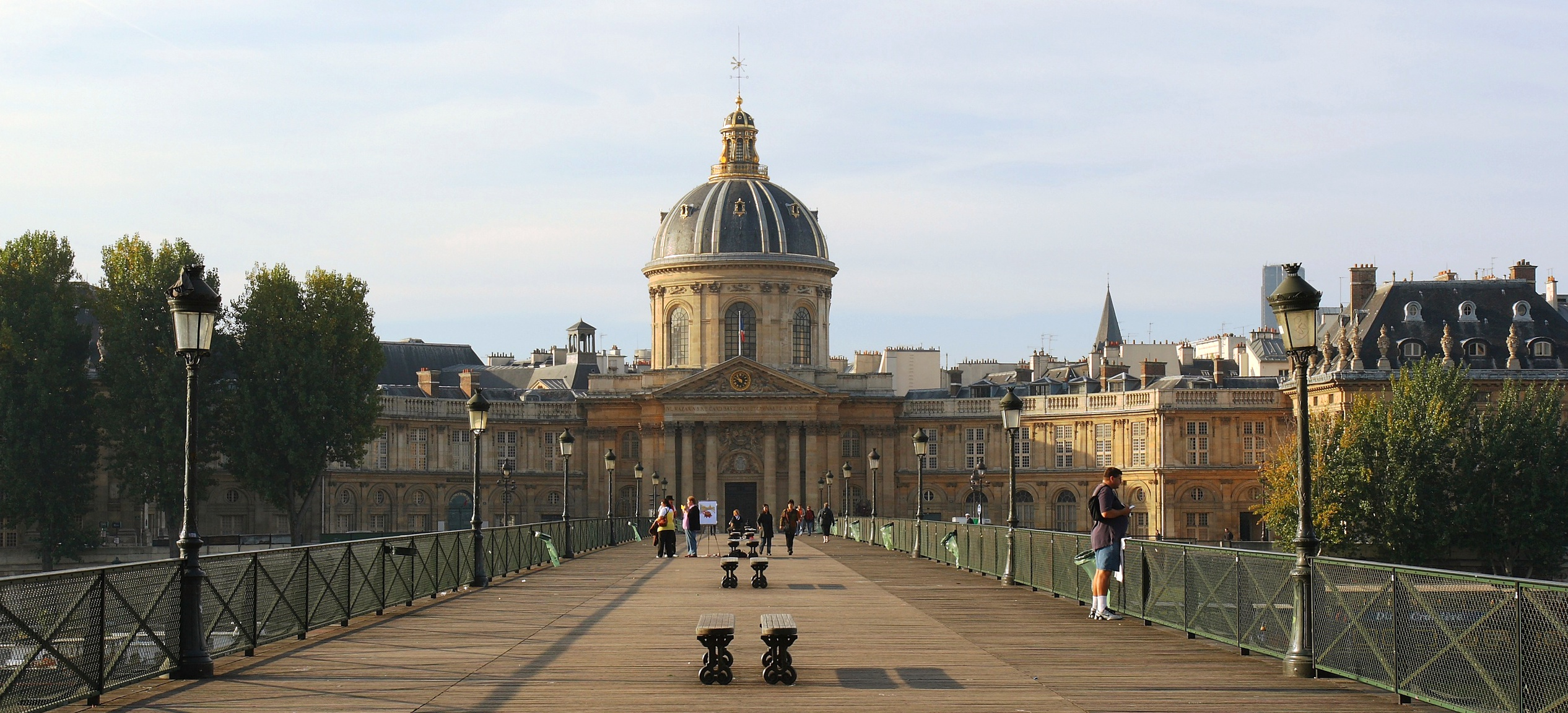
The Collège des Quatre-Nations, now the Institut de France built by Cardinal Mazarin (1662–1672)

- 1663
  - 6 January – Large banquet given at the Louvre, concluding with the premiere of L'École des femmes by Molière.
  - 8 February – The Académie royale de peinture et de sculpture re-organized by Louis XIV and his minister Colbert.
- 1665
  - First exposition of works by members of the Academy of Painting and Sculpture, the origin of the future Salons.
  - October – Manufacture royale de glaces de miroirs (mirror manufactory) established at Reuilly.
- 1666
  - 4 June – Premiere of Molière's play The Misanthrope.
  - 11 December – A decree re-organizes the policing of Paris, and quadruples the number of city watchmen.
  - 22 December – Establishment of the Académie royale des sciences.
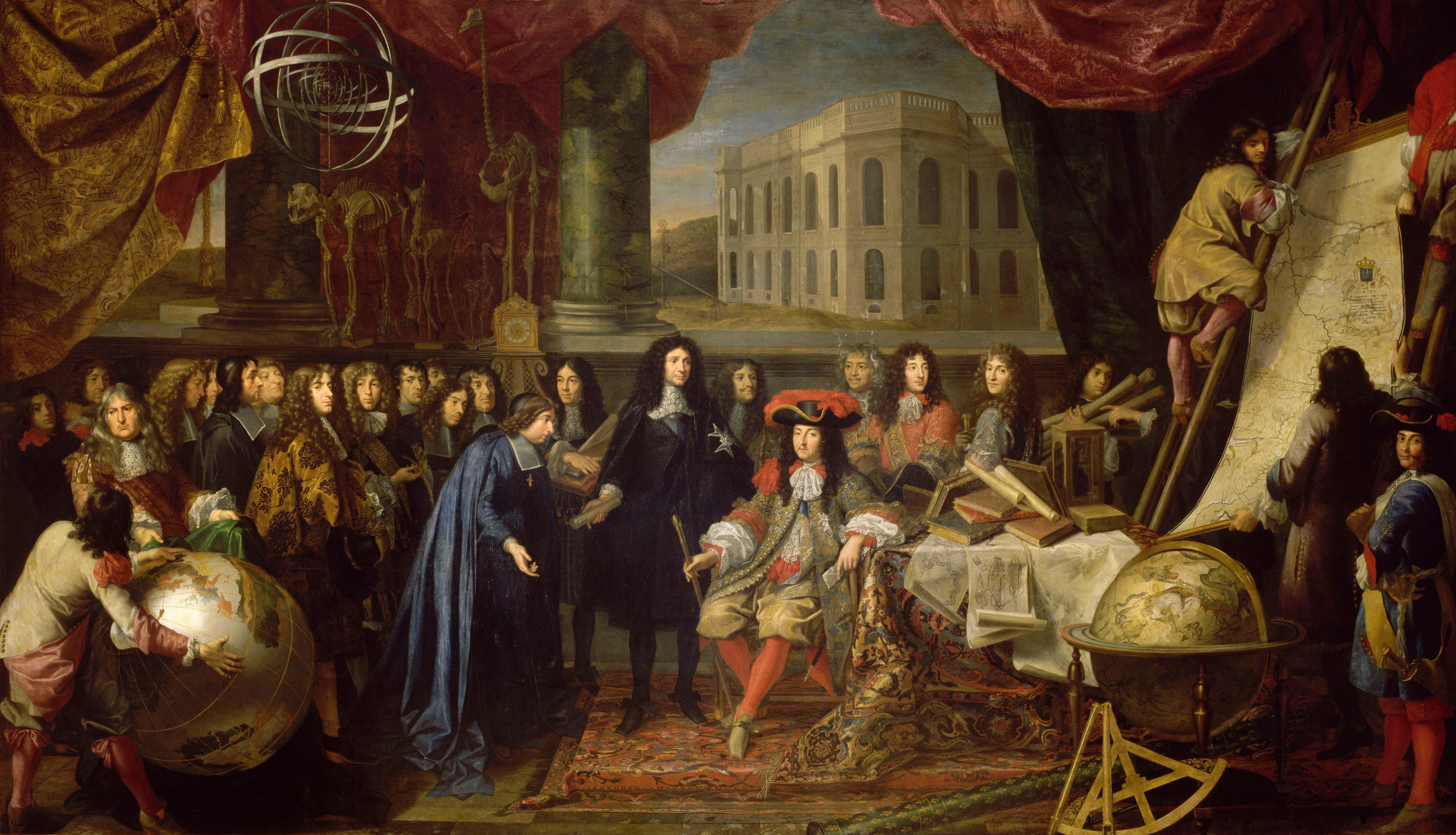
    Colbert presents the members of the Academy of Sciences to Louis XIV (1667)
- 1667
  - 17 February – The number of authorized printing houses in Paris is reduced to thirty-six to facilitate censorship.
  - March – The founding of the Paris Observatory, which is finished in 1672. It is located in the avenue de l'Observatoire. The Paris meridian becomes the meridian on all French maps: it runs through the center of the salle méridienne (also known as salle de Cassini) of the observatory.
  - 15 March – A royal edict creates the position of Lieutenant-General of Police. The first to hold the office is Gabriel Nicolas de La Reynie, named on 29 March.
  - 18 August – First regulations governing the height of buildings in Paris and the faubourgs.
  - 2 September – First royal ordinance for street lighting. 2,736 lanterns with candles are installed on 912 streets.
  - 15 September – The butte des Moulins, between, rue des Petits-Champs and rue Saint-Roch, is divided into lots, and twelve new streets created.
  - December – The royal Manufacture des meubles de la Couronne (royal manufacture of furniture) is created.
- 1669
  - 28 June – Académie royale de musique founded, the ancestor of the Paris Opera.
- 1670
  - 6 June – The King orders the demolition of the city walls built by Charles V and Louis XIII, to be replaced by boulevards lined with trees.
- 1671
  - 17 January – Performance of Psyché in the Salle des machines or Théâtre des Tuileries, staged by Molière, Corneille, Lully and Philippe Quinault.
  - 10 February – Louis XIV moves the royal court to Versailles.
  - 30 November – First stone placed for the Hôtel des Invalides, a home for wounded soldiers. It was inaugurated in October 1674.
- 1672
  - February – First successful Parisian café opens at the foire Saint-Germain, a fair held in the vicinity of the Saint-Germain-des-Prés Abbey.
  - April 1672 – First issue of Mercure galant, later Mercure de France, published. In 1678 it published the first reviews of high fashion.
  - 26 August – A new city regulation fixes the new limits of the city and tries again to limit any construction beyond them. Thirty-five new boundary stones are placed around the city in April 1674.
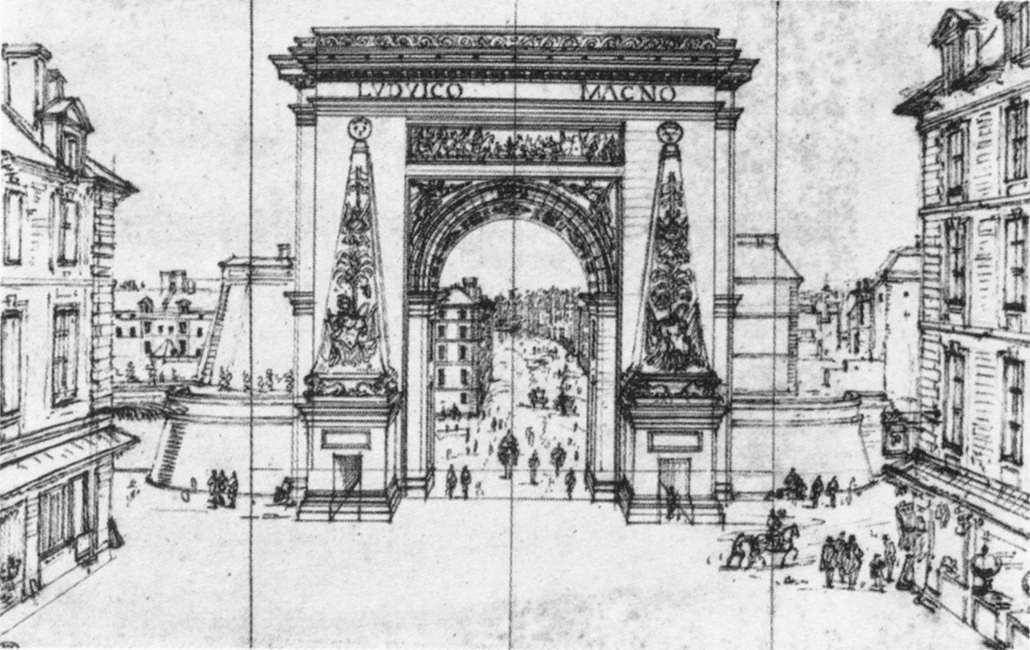
    The Porte Saint-Denis, built by Louis XIV on the site of the old city wall, which he declared were no longer needed (1675).
- 1673
  - Two large pumps built on the pont Notre-Dame to lift drinking water from the Seine. They continued working until 1858.
  - 17 March – Decree of the council to build the quai Neuf, which becomes the quai Le Pelletier.
  - Théâtre de Guénégaud founded.
- 1676
  - November – The owners of jeu de paume courts are allowed to install tables for billiards, a popular new game.
  - Limonadiers' guild established.
- 1680
  - 18 August – Comédie-Française founded.
- 1682
  - March – Colbert orders that a count be made of Protestants in Paris, and warns them to convert from what he calls "the so-called reformed religion".
  - 6 May – The official seat of the monarchy is moved from the Tuileries Palace to Château de Versailles.
  - November – The Collège de Clermont is renamed Collegium Ludovici Magni, Collège de Louis le Grand.
- 1685
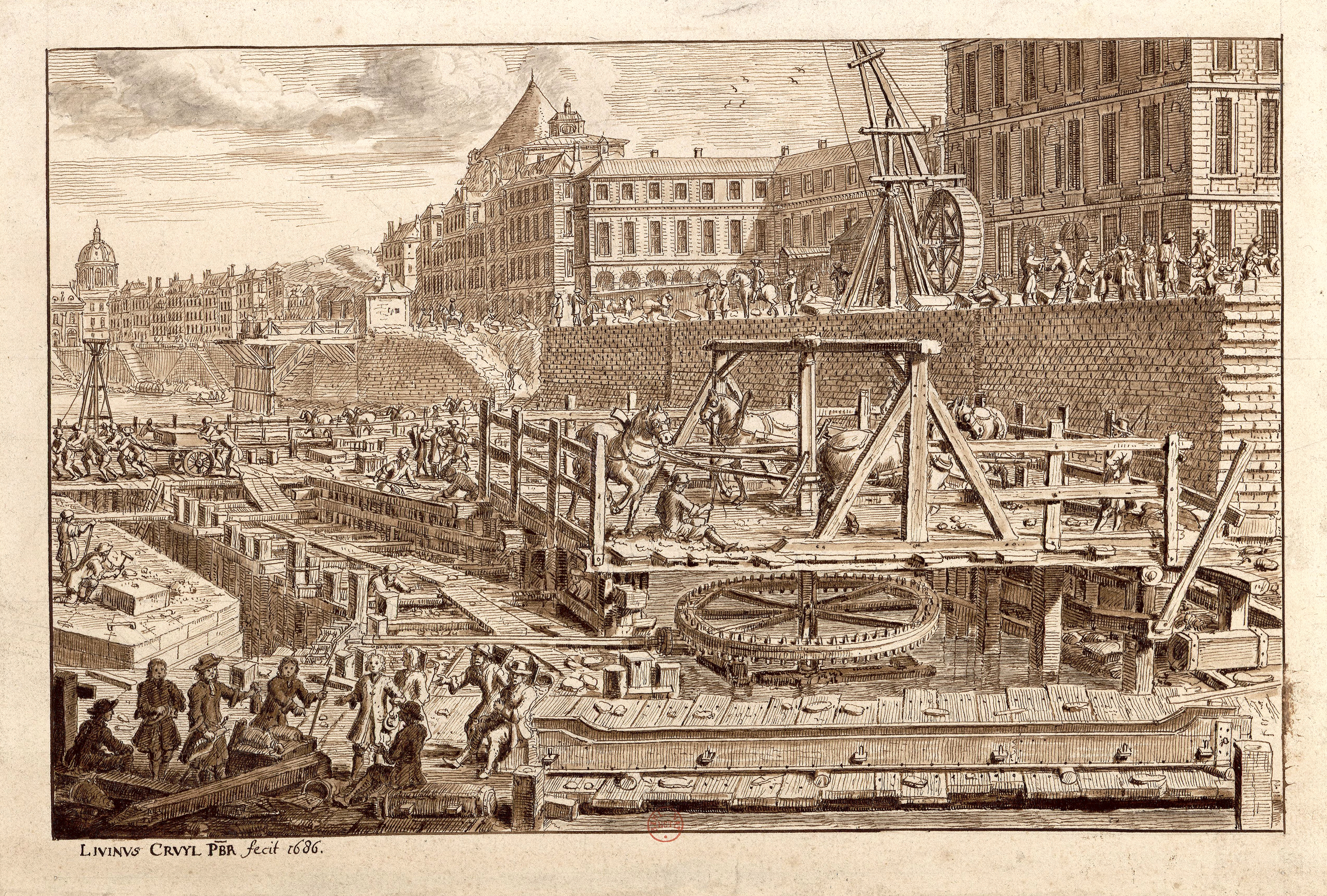
  Construction of the pont Royal(1685–1689)
  - The drinking of coffee with milk comes into fashion, described by Madame de Sévigné in a letter of 17 December 1688.
  - 4 July – The state buys the hôtel de Vendôme and the convent of the Capucines in order to build the future place Louis-le-Grand, the modern Place Vendôme.
  - 22 October – The Paris Parlement registers the revocation of the Edict of Nantes, revoking the toleration of the Protestant Church. The same day begins the demolition of the Protestant temple at Charenton.
  - 25 October – First stone placed for the pont Royal to replace the old pont Rouge. It was completed in June 1689.
- 1686
  - Café Procope, opens and remains the oldest Paris café in operation.
  - 28 March – Inauguration of Place des Victoires, with an equestrian statue of Louis XIV in the center. Since the houses around it have not yet been built, they are represented by painted backdrops.
- 1687
  - Ordinance permitting the Vilain family to open public baths along the river between the Cours-la-Reine and the Pont Marie.
- 1692
  - February – Creation of the position of the Lieutenant-General of the King for the government of Paris. The first to hold the title is Jean-Baptiste Le Ragois de Bretonvilliers de Saint-Dié.
- 1693
  - 20 October – During a bread shortage, the city authorities distribute bread to the poor. The effort ends in a riot, with many killed.
- 1697
  - June – The Comédie Italienne theater troupe is banned after they perform La Fausse prude at the Hôtel de Bourgogne; the play has an unflattering character clearly representing Madame de Maintenon, the morganatic wife of Louis XIV. The actors are compelled to leave the city.
- 1698
  - 18 September – A mysterious prisoner wearing a black velvet mask is incarcerated in the Bastille. Voltaire romanticizes this story into that of a prisoner with an iron mask, who later becomes the subject of the novel The Vicomte of Bragelonne: Ten Years Later by Alexandre Dumas.

== 18th century ==
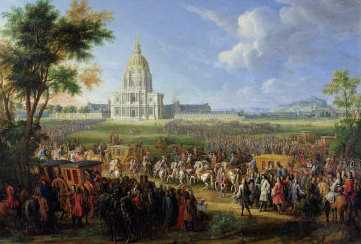
Louis XIV visits the unfinished Les Invalides in 1706

- 1701
  - December – A royal edict divides the city into twenty police districts, added to the sixteen quarters created by the Hôtel de Ville.
- 1706
  - 28 August – Consecration of the church of Les Invalides, in the presence of the King.
- 1709
  - 6 January – Extreme cold hits Paris, that will last until the end of March. Temperature drops to -40 Celsius, (estimated as the thermometer was invented that year.)the Seine freezes, causing shipments of food by boat to be stopped. The cold wave paralyzes all of France, making it also impossible to bring supplies to Paris by road. In that period, twenty four to thirty thousand persons die from hunger and cold in Paris alone; near one million in all of France.
  - 15 March – Seine begins to thaw, causing flood.
  - 5 April – First food shipment reaching Paris by road.
  - 20 August – Food riot quelled by the army, leaving two dead.
- 1714
  - 7 August – Royal Council prohibits building on the boulevards from the Porte Saint-Honoré to Porte Saint-Antoine without authorization of the Bureau de la Ville.
- 1715
  - 1 September – Death of Louis XIV. Philippe d'Orléans becomes Regent and on 30 December moves the five-year-old king Louis XV and Court from Versailles to Paris.
  - 31 December – An ordinance authorizes the first public ball in Paris, the masked ball at the Paris Opera.
- 1716
  - 2 May – The founding of the Banque Générale, the first private bank in Paris, by the Scotsman John Law.
  - 18 May – The Comédie Italienne theater troupe, banned by Louis XIV in 1697 to perform in Paris, is allowed to return and performs at the Palais Royal.
- 1718
  - 4 December – The Banque Générale becomes the Banque Royale and effectively the central bank of France. Two-thirds of its assets are government bills and notes.
  - 10 July – The construction begins of the Hôtel d'Évreux, the town house of Louis Henri de La Tour d'Auvergne, Count of Évreux, finished in 1720. In the 19th century it became the Élysée Palace, residence of the presidents of the French Republic.
- 1720
  - Completion of Place Louis-le-Grand, now Place Vendôme.
  - 24 March – John Law's Bank closes, unable to pay its subscribers. Financial panic follows, and the Paris stock market is closed until 1724.
  - 10 July – Rioters storm the Banque Royale, demanding to exchange their banknotes for silver. Banker John Law flees to Brussels, then Venice.
- 1721
  - 28 November – Public execution of the bandit Louis-Dominique Cartouche, famed for robbing the rich and giving to the poor. Thanks to a play about him the same year by the Comédie Italienne, he became a Parisian folk hero.
- 1722
  - Construction begins of the Palais-Bourbon, finished in 1728. After the Revolution of 1789, it became the seat of the National Assembly.

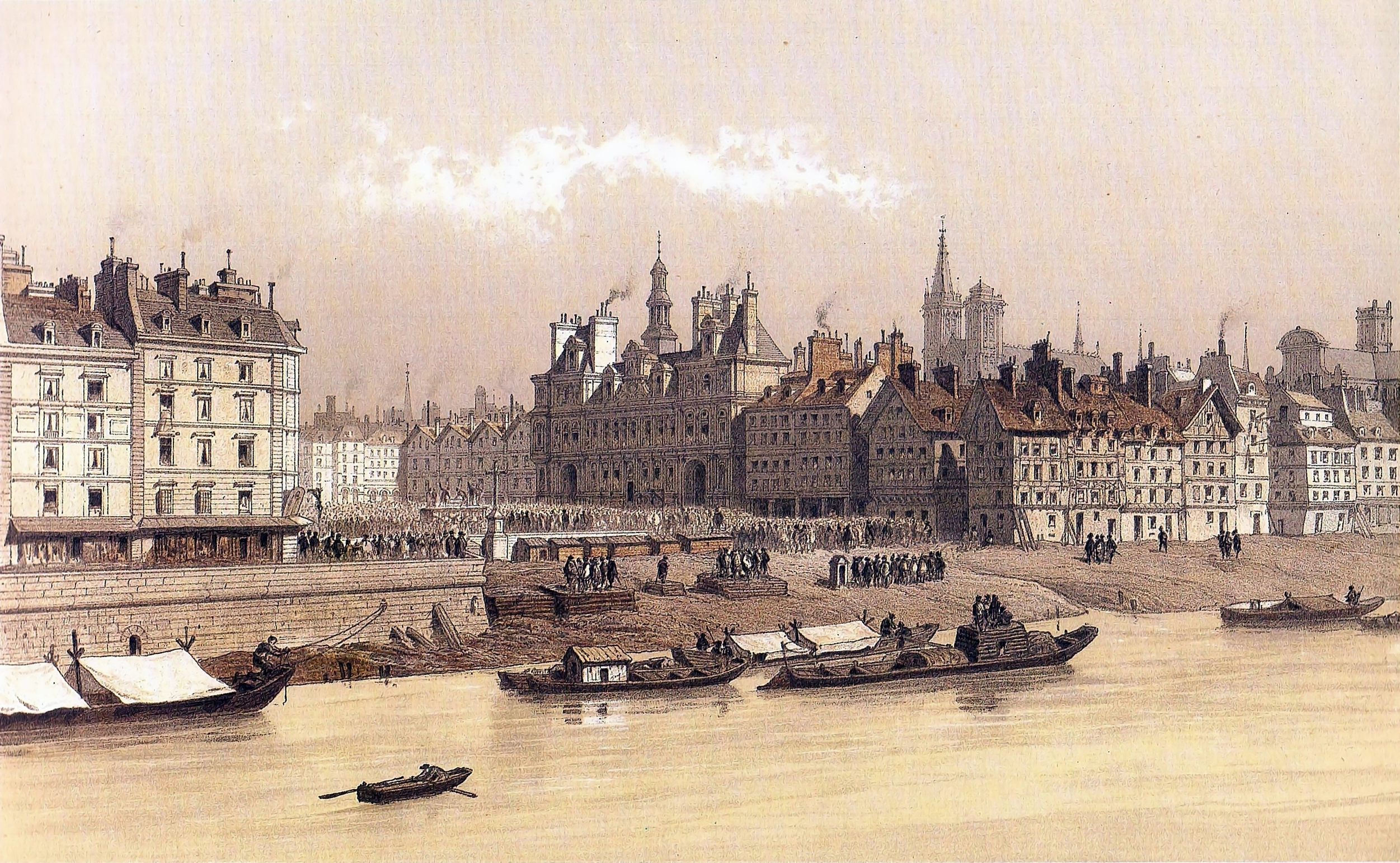
The Hôtel de Ville in 1740

- 1723
  - 23 February – A royal regulation forbids printing houses and publishing outside of the Latin quarter on the Left Bank. The law is intended to make censorship more effective.
- 1728
  - 16 January – First street signs, made of iron painted white with black letters, put in place. They were easy to steal, and in 1729 were replaced by carved stone plaques.
- 1731 – Académie royale de chirurgie (Royal Academy of Surgery) established.
- 1732–1775 – Construction of Church of Saint-Sulpice
- 1735
  - 10 September – A new royal regulation simplifies the procedure for searching publishing houses and bookstores, strengthening censorship.
  - Premiere of Rameau's Les Indes galantes.
- 1738 – The founding of the royal porcelain manufactory in Vincennes; it was transferred in 1757 to Sèvres.
- 1745
  - 26 March – Permission given by the royal censors for the publication of the first Encyclopédie. It was published between 1751 and 1772.
- 1749
  - March – The exhibition at the Saint-Germain fair of the first rhinoceros ever to be seen in Paris.
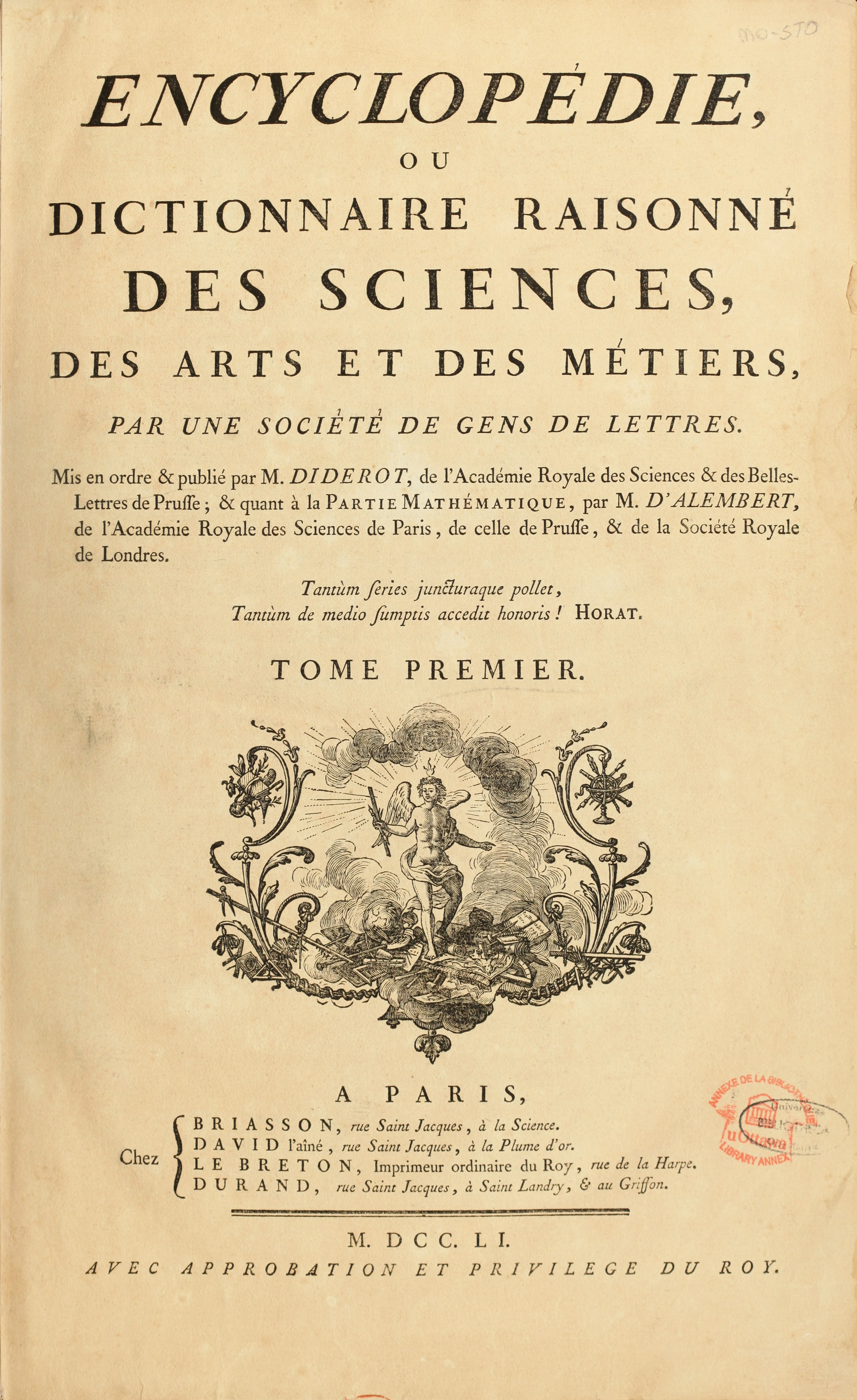
    The Encyclopédie, published in Paris by Diderot and D'Alembert between 1751 and 1772
- 1751
  - 22 January – The École Militaire is established.
- 1752
  - 31 January – The first Encyclopédie is condemned by the archbishop of Paris.
- 1756–1772 – The construction of Place Louis XV (now the Place de la Concorde).

Construction begins on the church of Sainte-Geneviève (now the Panthéon).

- 1760
  - 9 June – First postal delivery begins in Paris.
- 1761 – City bans hanging shop signs.
- 1763
  - Bibliothèque historique de la ville de Paris opens.
  - 6 April – A fire destroys the theater of the Palais-Royal. The Paris Opera moves for seven months to the Tuileries Palace.
  - 20 June – Statue of Louis XV dedicated in the Place Louis XV (now Place de la Concorde).
- 1764
  - 3 April – First stone laid of the church of Church of the Madeleine.
  - 6 September – First stone laid of the church of Sainte-Geneviève.
- 1765
  - Almanach des Muses (poetry annual) begins publication.
  - The establishment of Boulanger offers Parisians a choice of "restaurants", namely soups, meat and egg dishes, in competition with existing taverns and cabarets. This was a predecessor of the modern restaurant.
- 1767
  - September – Benjamin Franklin comes to Paris to discuss his experiments with electricity with French scientists
  - 1767–1783 – The grain market (Halle aux Blés) constructed. In 1885 the building became the Paris Chamber of Commerce.
- 1768
  - House numbering ordinance issued.
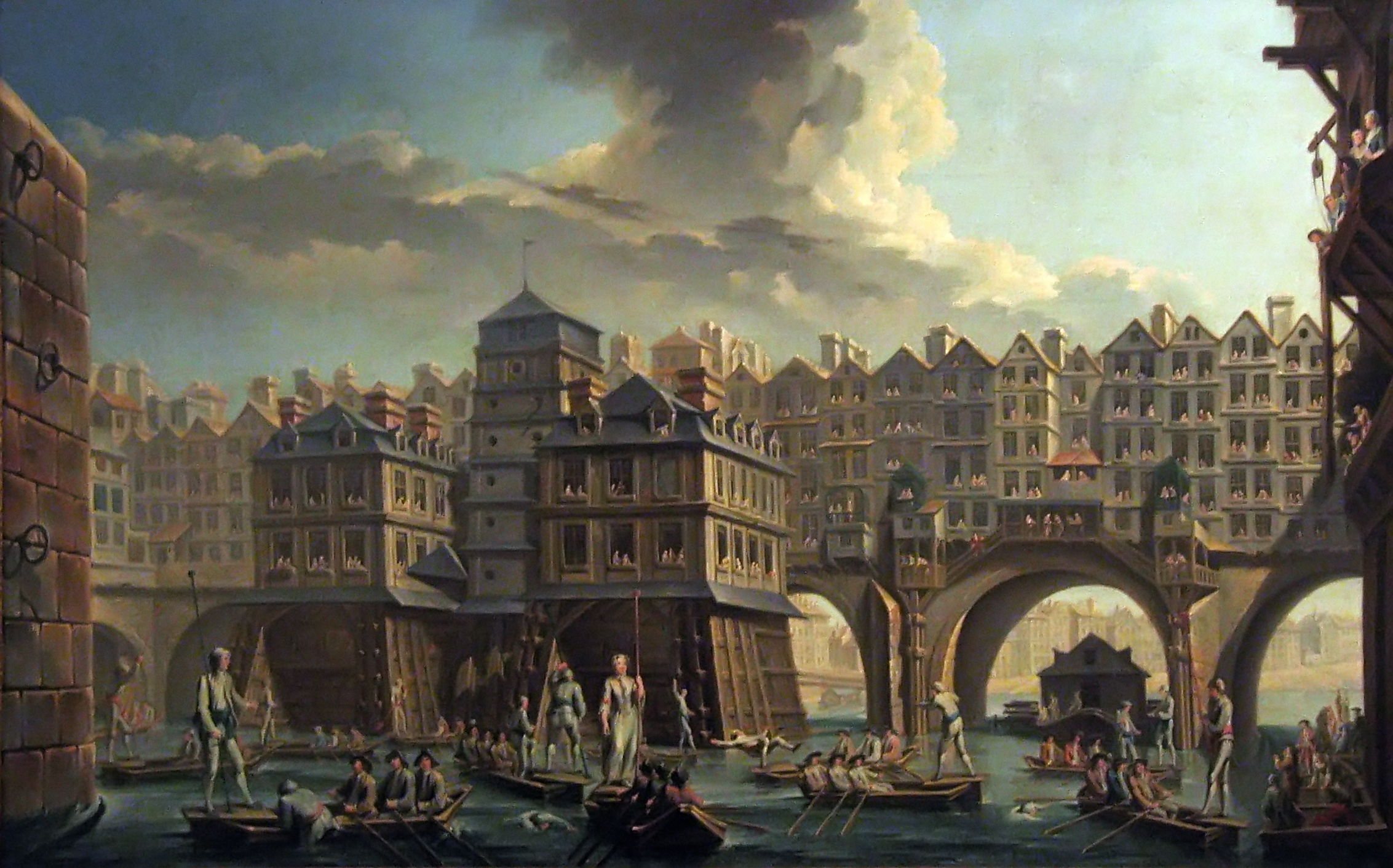
    Pont-au-Change in 1756
- 1770
  - 30 May – Tragic fireworks display, Place Louis XV, during festivities given in celebration of the marriage of the Dauphin and Dauphine (the future king Louis XVI and queen Marie Antoinette); 132 persons died.
- 1775
  - 23 February – First performance of The Barber of Seville (play) by Pierre Beaumarchais in the theater of the Tuileries Palace.
  - Hôtel des Monnaies (mint) built.
- 1776
  - Cour du Commerce-Saint-André, a covered shopping street in the 6th arrondissement, opens.
  - Société Royale de Médecine (Royal Society of Medicine) established.
  - August – The foundung of a corporation of merchants of fashion, also including feather dealers and florists, separate from the corporation of small shopkeepers.
  - 10 August – The opening of the first Paris chemical factory, making sulfuric acid, Javel water and later chlorine, first at Épinay-sur-Seine, then at Javel.
- 1777
  - Mont de Piété and Marché d'Aligre (market) established.
  - Journal de Paris newspaper begins publication.
  - The Courrier de la Mode ou Journal du Goût, the first Paris fashion magazine, begins publication.
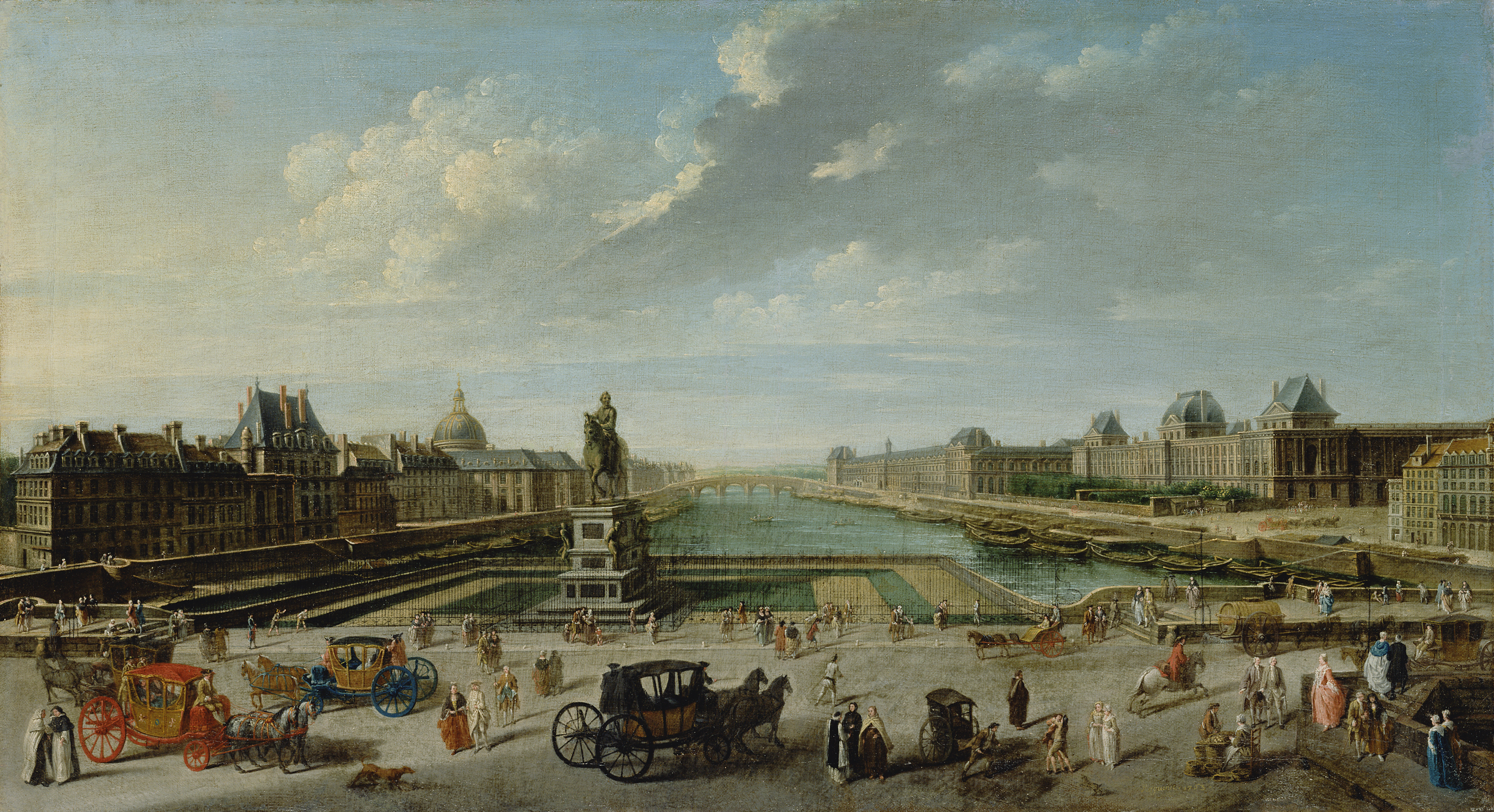
    View of Paris from the Pont Neuf (1763)
- 1778
  - Opening of boulevards du Temple, Saint-Martin, Saint-Denis, and Bonne-Nouvelle.
- 1779
  - First house numbers are put in place, as part of a project of the Almanach of Paris.

=== 1780s–1790s – The French Revolution ===
- 1780
  - Closing of the 12th century cemetery of the Saints-Innocents. The church was closed in 1786 and demolished the following year.
- 1781
  - First sidewalks in Paris constructed on rue de l'Odéon.
- 1782
  - Amphithéâtre Anglais, the first purpose-built circus in France, opens.
  - Construction begins of the Hôtel de Salm, finished in 1784. After the Revolution of 1789, it became the Palais de la Légion d'Honneur.
- 1783
  - Royal decrees requiring a relation between the height of buildings and the width of the street, and declaring that new streets must be at least thirty feet (about ten meters) wide.
  - 3 September – Treaty of Paris signed at 56 rue Jacob by Benjamin Franklin, John Jay, John Adams, and Henry Laurens for the United States and David Hartley for Britain, ending the American Revolution.
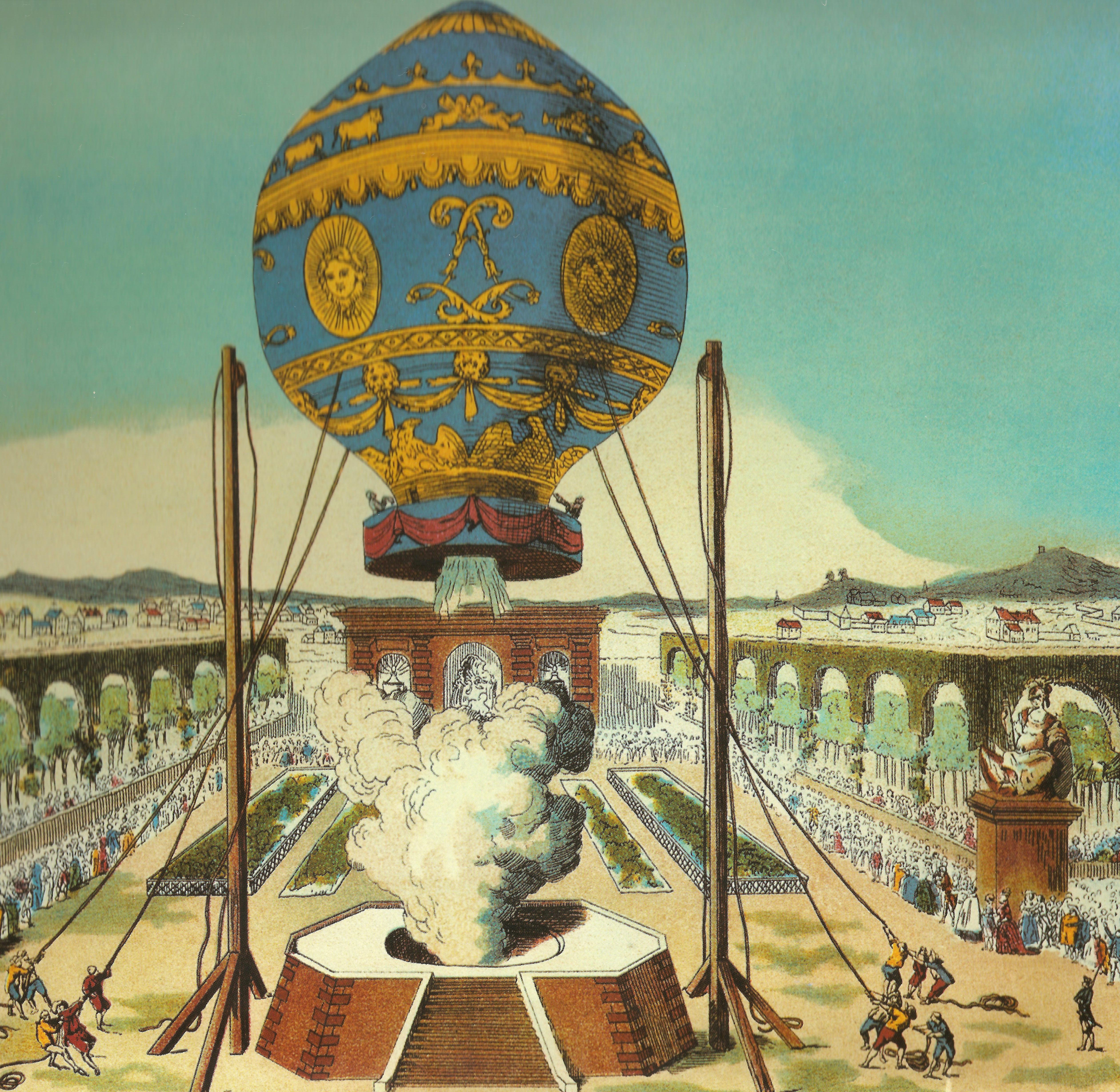
    Depiction of the Montgolfier brothers' first balloon ascension, a captive ascension with two men aboard, on 19 October 1783, in the gardens of the royal wallpaper manufacturer Jean-Baptiste Réveillon, in the faubourg Saint-Antoine, in Paris. Picture was published in Journal officiel n° 299, dated 26 October 1783.
  - 21 November – The first manned free flight in a balloon launched by the Montgolfier brothers, between the parc de la Muette and the Butte-aux-Cailles.
  - École des Mines established.
- 1784 – Wall of the Farmers-General construction begins.
- 1786
  - Galerie de bois (shopping arcade) opens in the Palais-Royal.
  - 8 June – A decree of the Prévôt de Paris authorized caterers and chefs to establish restaurants and to serve clients until eleven in the evening in winter and midnight in summer.
  - The first restaurant in the modern sense, the Taverne anglaise, is opened by Antoine Beauvilliers in the arcade of the Palais-Royal.
  - Construction begins of a large steam-powered pump at Gros-Caillou, on the Quai d'Orsay, to provide drinking water from the Seine for the population of the left bank.
  - September – A royal edict orders the demolition of houses built on the Paris bridges and on some of the quays. The edict was carried out in 1788.
- 1787
  - The duc d'Orléans sells spaces in the arcades of the Palais-Royal which are occupied by cafés, restaurants and shops.
  - Construction approved of the Pont Louis XVI, now Pont de la Concorde.
- 1788
  - 13 July – Devastating hail storms accompanied by strong winds of a force rarely seen, following a path from the southwest of France to the north, destroyed crops, orchards, killed farm animals, tore roofs and toppled steeples. In Paris, the faubourg Saint-Antoine was hardest hit. It caused a major increase in bread prices, and the migration of thousands of peasants into Paris.
  - 16 August – The French state becomes bankrupt, and begins issuing paper money to pay for pensions, rents and the salaries of soldiers. Large-scale demonstrations and civil disorders begin.
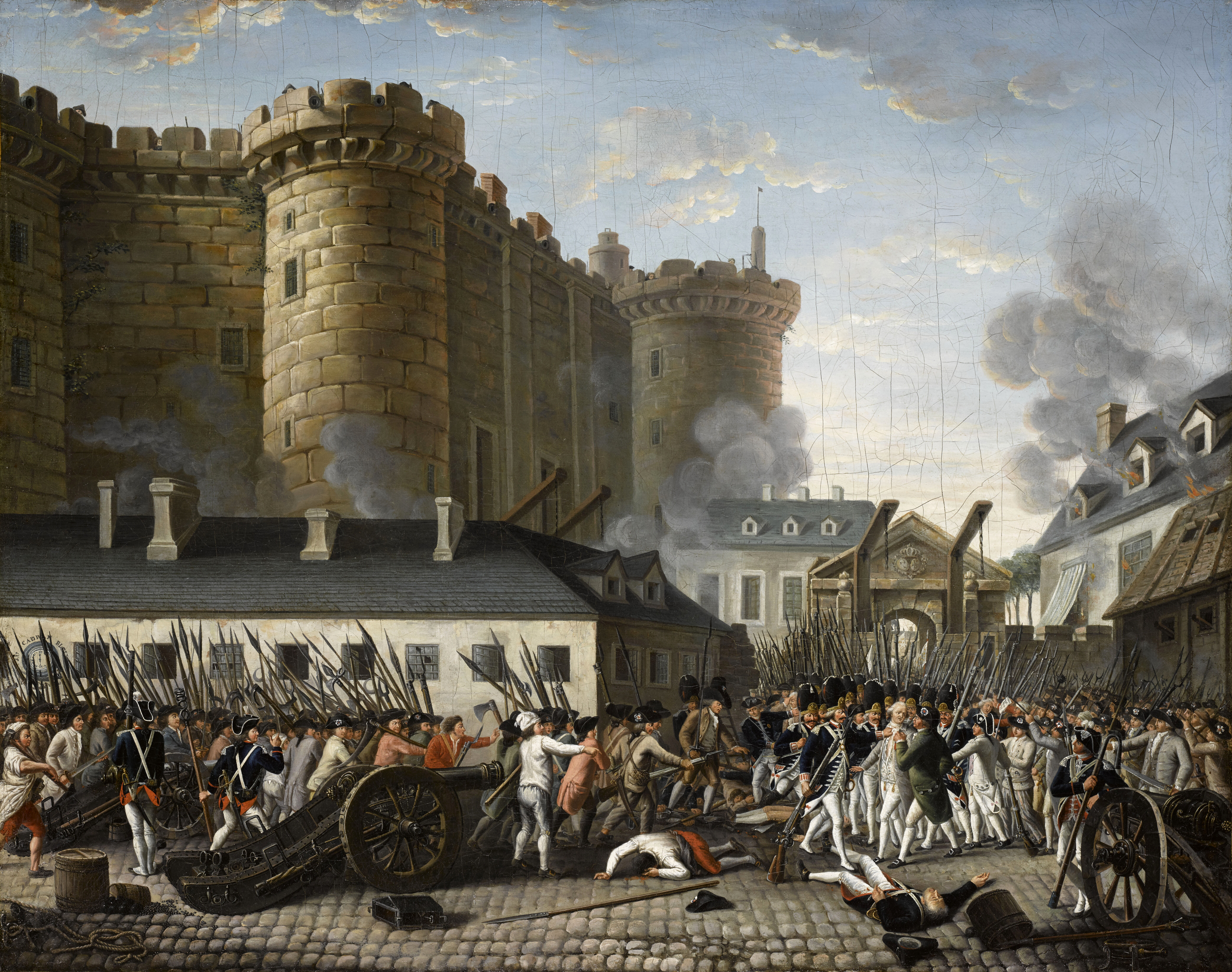
    The storming of the Bastille (14 July 1789). Anonymous.
  - Société des Amis des Noirs founded.
- 1789
  - 12–19 May – Paris elects deputies to the Estates-General, a legislative assembly summoned by Louis XVI to raise funds.
  - 12 July – Parisians respond to the dismissal of the King's reformist minister, Necker, with civil disturbances. Confrontations between Royal-Allemand Dragoon Regiment and a crowd of protestors on Place Louis XV, and Sunday strollers in the Tuileries gardens. Mobs storm the city armories and take weapons. In the evening, the new customs barriers around the city are burned.
  - 14 July – Storming of the Bastille, a symbol of royal authority, releasing seven prisoners. The governor of the Bastille surrenders and is lynched by the crowd.
  - 15 July – The astronomer Jean Sylvain Bailly is chosen Mayor of Paris at the Hôtel de Ville.
  - 17 July – King Louis XVI comes to the Hôtel de Ville and accepts a tricolor cocarde.
  - 5–6 October – The royal family is forced to move from Versailles to Paris.
  - 19 October – The deputies of the National Assembly move from Versailles to Paris, first to the residence of the Archbishop, then, on 9 November, to the Manège of the Tuileries Palace.
  - Théâtre Feydeau founded.
- 1790
  - 14 July – The Fête de la Fédération, celebrating the first anniversary of the Revolution.
- 1791
  - 3 April – The church of Sainte-Geneviève is transformed into the Panthéon. Mirabeau is the first famous Frenchman to have his tomb placed there on 4 April, followed by Voltaire on 11 July.
  - 20–21 June – The King and his family flee Paris, but are captured at Varennes and brought back on 25 June.
  - 17 July – A large demonstration on the Champ de Mars demands the immediate proclamation of a republic. The National Assembly orders Mayor Bailly to disperse the crowd. Soldiers fire on the crowd, killing many.
  - 19 September – Mayor Bailly resigns.
- 1792
  - 25 April – First execution using the guillotine of the bandit Nicolas Pelletier on the Place de Grève.
  - 20 June – Sans-culottes invade the Tuileries Palace and put a red Phrygian cap on king Louis XVI's head.
  - 20 July – Government calls for volunteers for the army, and on 21 June proclaims that the country is in danger of foreign attack.
  - 10 August – The insurrectional Paris Commune seizes the Hôtel de Ville and the Tuileries Palace, and suspends the power of the king.
  - 2–5 September – Massacre of more than 1,300 persons in Paris prisons, among which the princesse de Lamballe.
  - 21 September – Proclamation of the French Republic by the convention, the new National Assembly.
  - Théâtre du Vaudeville opens.
  - 20 November – Discovery of the Armoire de fer, an iron box containing documents incriminating Louis XVI, in his apartment at the Tuileries.
  - 10 to 26 December – King Louis XVI's trial.
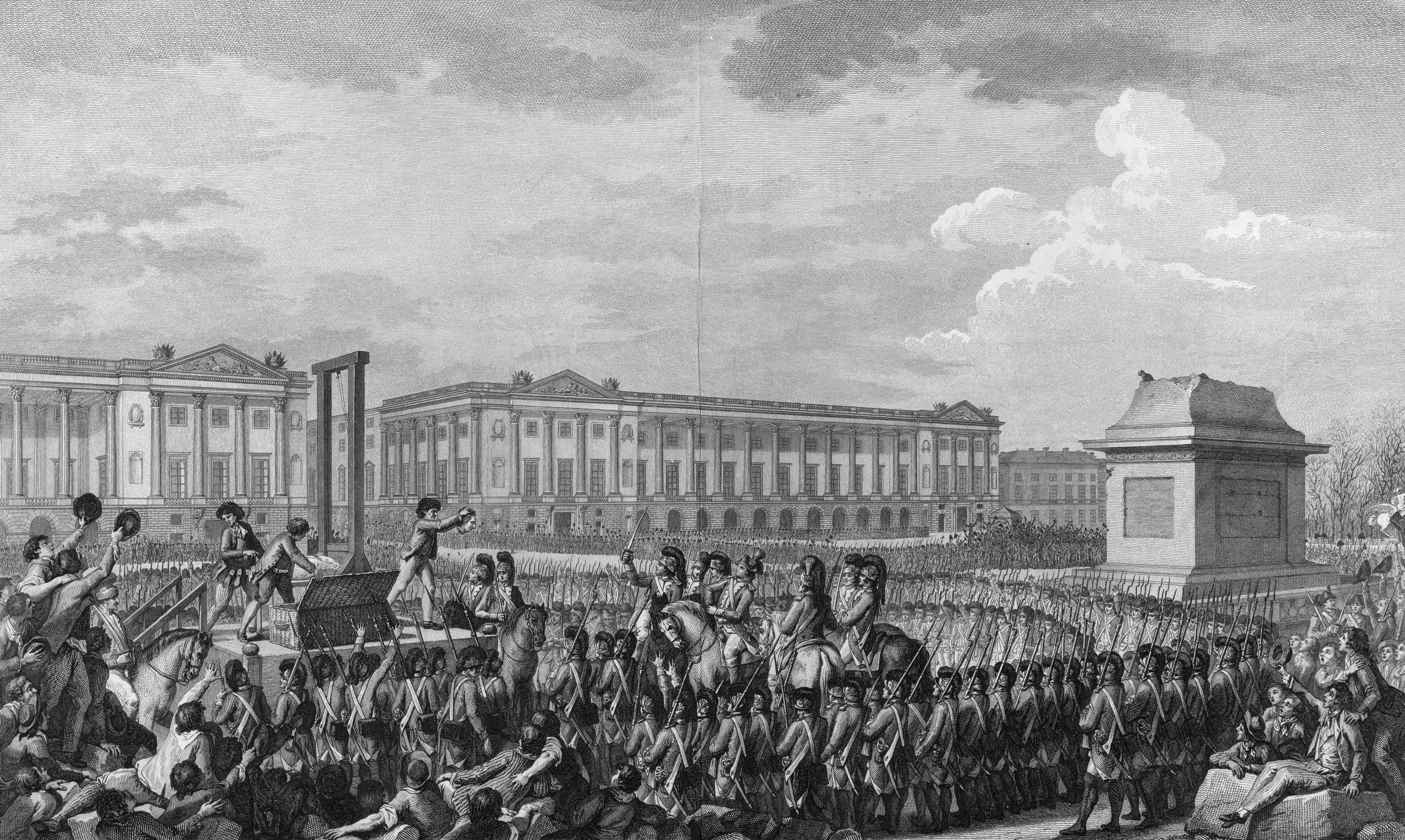
    The execution of King Louis XVI on the Place de la Révolution, 21 January 1793. Bibliothèque nationale de France
- 1793
  - 21 January – Execution of Louis XVI on the Place de la Révolution (former Place Louis XV, now Place de la Concorde).
  - 10 March – Creation of the Revolutionary Tribunal to judge enemies of the Revolution.
  - 16 October – Execution of queen Marie Antoinette on the Place de la Révolution.
  - 6 November – Execution of Louis Philippe II, Duke of Orléans, Philippe Égalité, on the Place de la Révolution.
  - 8 November – Opening of the Museum Central des Arts, (later named the Louvre Museum).
  - 12 November – French citizens are required by law to use the familiar personal pronoun "tu" form instead of the formal "vous".
  - 23 November – All the churches of Paris are ordered closed by the government.
  - National Museum of Natural History (founded in 1635) re-organized and renamed.
- 1794
  - 30 March – Arrest of Georges Danton, chief opponent of Robespierre. He is guillotined 5 April.
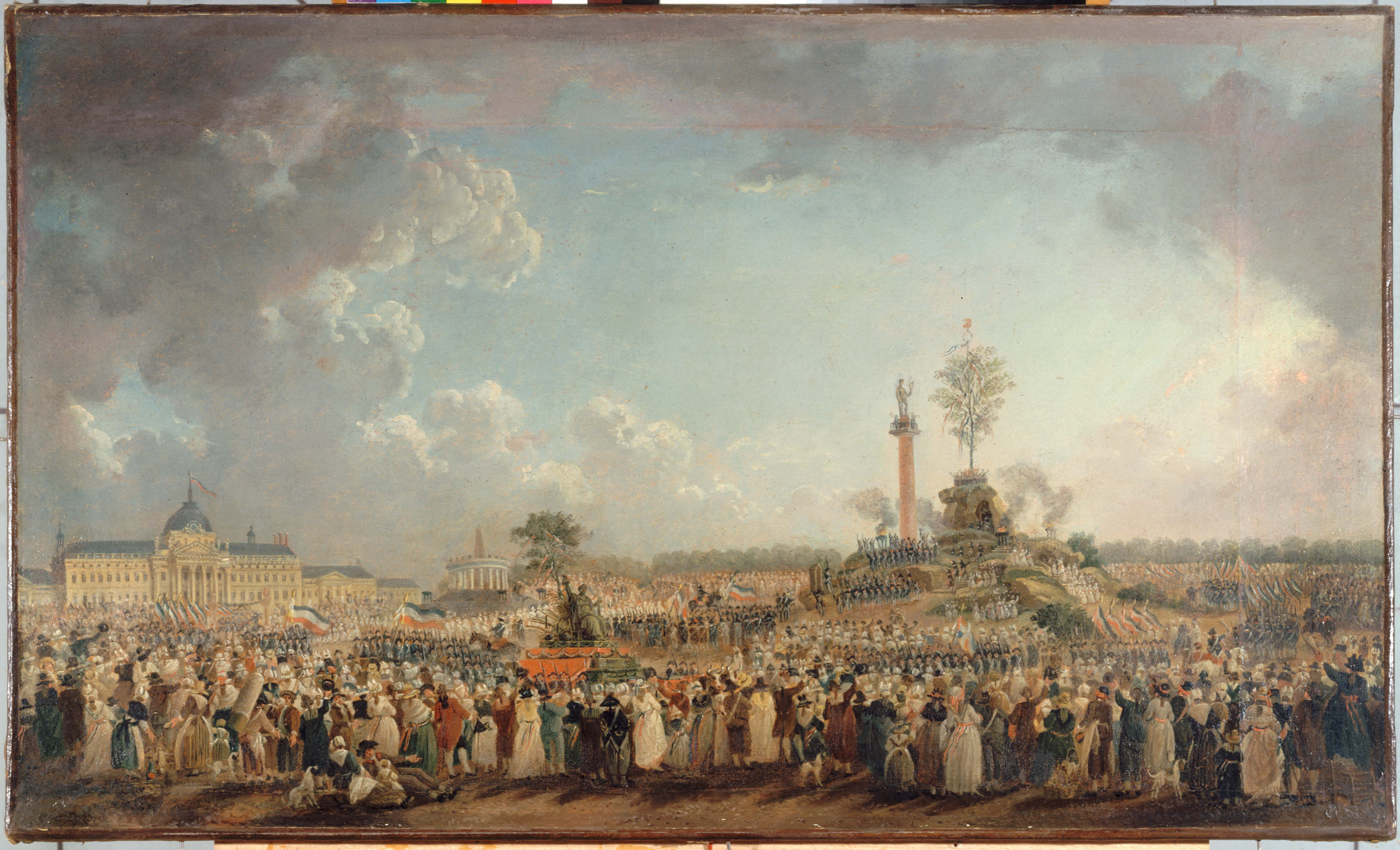
    The Festival of the Supreme Being, by Pierre-Antoine Demachy, 8 June 1794.
  - 8 June – Celebration of the Cult of the Supreme Being held on Champ de Mars, presided over by Robespierre.
  - 11 June – Beginning of the climax of Reign of Terror, period known as the Grande Terreur. Between June 11 and 27 July, 1,366 persons are condemned to death.
  - 27 July – 9th Thermidor, the convention accuses Robespierre of crimes. He is arrested together with several of his acolytes, among which Saint-Just.
  - 28 July – Robespierre and those arrested with him are guillotined, this signaling the end of the Reign of Terror.
  - 24 August – The revolutionary committees of the twelve Paris sections are abolished, and replaced by new arrondissement committees.
  - 31 August – The municipal government of Paris is abolished, and the city put directly under the national government.
  - 22 October – The École centrale des travaux publics, predecessor of the École Polytechnique (school) established.
- 1795
  - 20 May – Rioting sans-culottes invade the convention meeting hall, demanding "bread and the 1793 Constitution". Army troops loyal to the government occupy the Faubourg Saint-Antoine and disarm demonstrators.
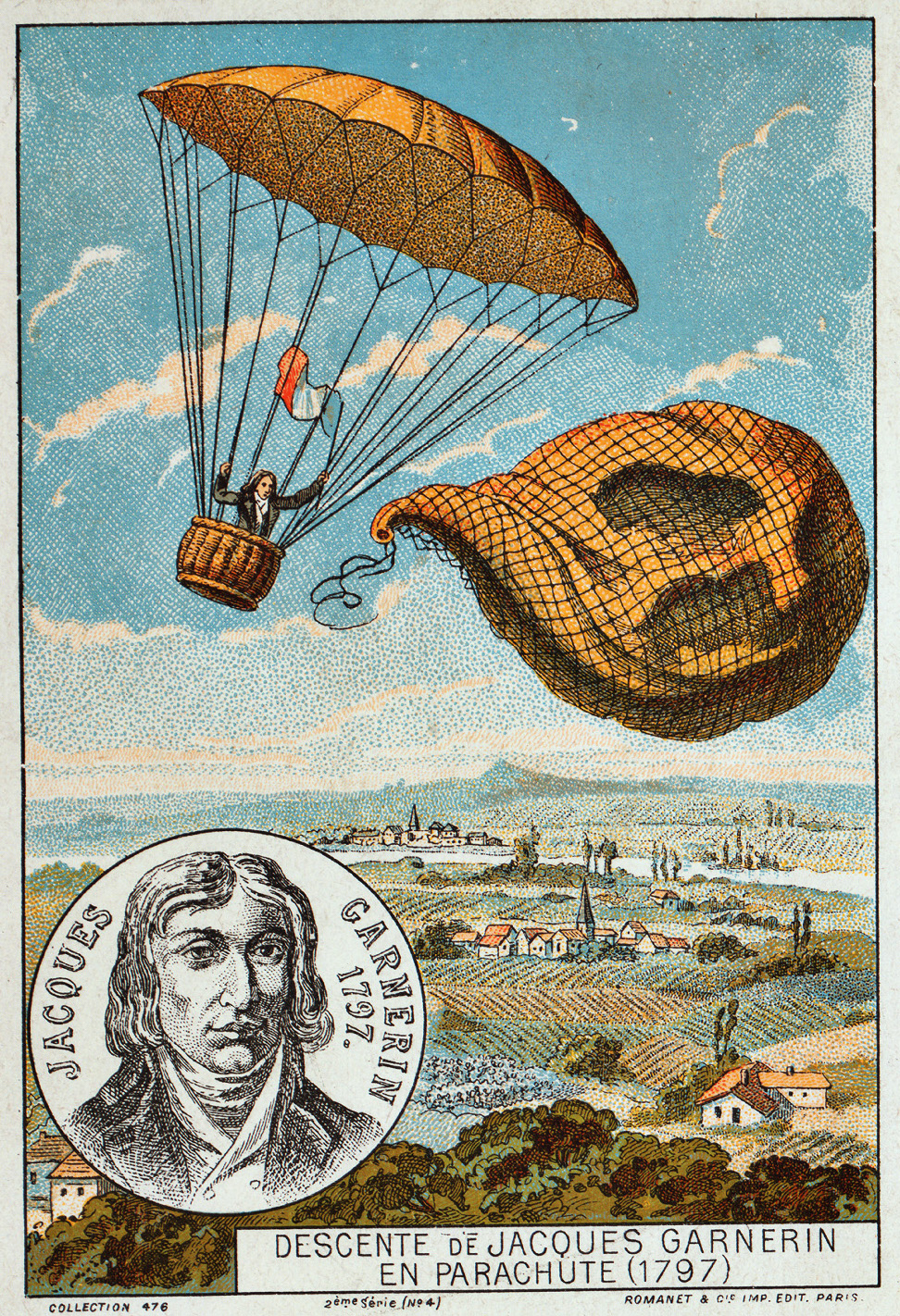
    First use of a frameless parachute from a Montgolfier balloon over Paris by André Garnerin in 1797
  - 5 October – An uprising by royalists in the center of the city is suppressed with artillery fire by General Napoleon Bonaparte.
  - 11 October – Paris is once again organized into twelve municipalities, within the new department of the Seine.
  - 2 November – The Directory government is established.
- 1796 – Société de Médecine de Paris (Society of Medicine) established.
- 1797
  - Arsenal Library opens.
  - 22 October – First parachute jump with a frameless parachute made by André Garnerin from a Montgolfier balloon at an altitude of 700 meters over the Plaine de Monceau.
- 1799
  - Passage du Caire (shopping arcade) opens.
  - 10 November – Coup d'état du 18 brumaire, Napoléon Bonaparte stages a coup d'état and dissolves the government of the Directory.
  - 25 December – The Consulate is organized, with Napoléon Bonaparte as First Consul.

== 19th century ==
=== 1800–1815 – The First Empire ===
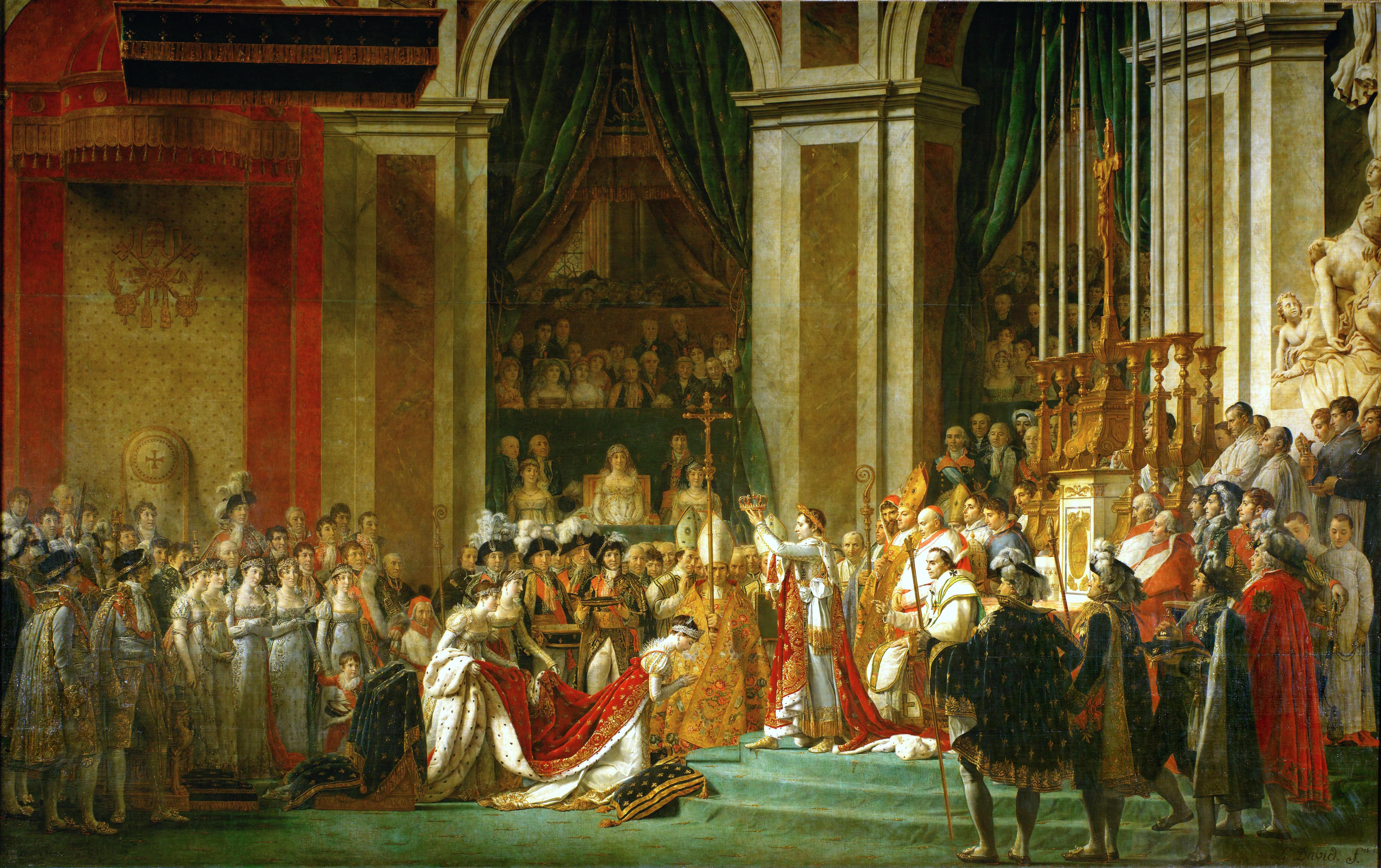
Coronation of Napoleon, Emperor of the French, at the Cathedral of Notre-Dame-de-Paris (2 December 1804)

- 1800
  - 13 February – Banque de France created.
  - 17 February – Napoleon reorganizes city into twelve arrondissements, each with a mayor with little power, under two Prefects, one for the police and one for administration of the city, both appointed by him.
  - 19 February – Napoleon makes the Tuileries Palace his residence.

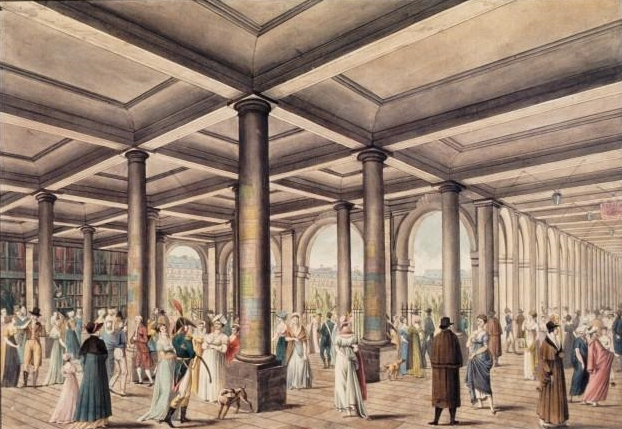
Galeries of the Palais-Royal in 1800

- 1801
  - Population: 548,000
  - 12 March – Napoleon orders the creation of three new cemeteries outside the city; Montmartre to the north; Père-Lachaise to the east, and Montparnasse to the south.
  - 15 March – Napoleon orders the building of three new bridges: Pont d'Austerlitz, Pont Saint-Louis and Pont des Arts.
  - Passage des Panoramas (shopping arcade) opens.
- 1802
  - 19 March – Napoleon orders the construction of a canal from the Ourcq river to bring fresh drinking water to Paris.
  - Napoleon establishes a committee of public health, to improve city sanitation.
- 1803
  - 9 August – Robert Fulton demonstrates the first steamboat on the Seine.
  - 24 September – Pont des Arts, the first iron bridge in Paris, opens to public. Pedestrians pay five centimes for a crossing.
- 1804
  - 2 December – Napoleon I crowns himself Emperor of the French at the cathedral of Notre Dame de Paris.
  - Père Lachaise Cemetery consecrated.
  - First awards of the Legion of Honor at the Invalides. The former hôtel de Salm becomes the Palais de la Légion d'honneur.
  - Le Rocher de Cancale restaurant opens.
- 1805
  - 4 February – Napoleon decrees a new system of house numbers, beginning at the Seine, with even numbers on the right side of street and odd numbers on the left.
- 1806
  - 2 May – Decree ordering the building of fourteen new fountains, including the Fontaine du Palmier on the Place du Châtelet, to provide drinking water.
  - 7 July – First stone laid for the Arc de Triomphe du Carrousel, on Place du Carrousel, between the Tuileries Palace and the Louvre.
  - 8 August – First stone laid for the Arc de Triomphe at Étoile. Inaugurated on 29 July 1836, during the reign of Louis Philippe.
  - 24 November – Opening of the Pont d'Austerlitz.
  - 2 December – Decree ordering the creation a "Temple of Glory" dedicated to the soldiers of Napoleon's armies on the site of the unfinished church of the Madeleine.
- 1807
  - Population: 580,000
  - 13 January – Pont d'Iéna inaugurated. and Théâtre des Variétés opens.
  - 13 June – Decree to build rue Soufflot on the left bank, on the axis of the Panthéon.
  - 29 July – Decree reducing the number of theaters in Paris to eight; the Opéra, Opéra-Comique, Théâtre-Français, Théâtre de l'Impératrice (Odéon); Vaudeville, Variétés, Ambigu, Gaîté. The Opéra Italien, Cirque Olympique and Théâtre de Porte-Saint-Martin were added later.
- 1808
  - 2 December – Completion of the Ourcq Canal, bringing fresh drinking water 107 kilometers to Paris.
  - 2 December – First stone placed of the elephant fountain on Place de la Bastille. Only a wood and plaster full-size version was completed.
- 1809
  - 16 August – Opening of the flower market on quai Desaix (now quai de Corse).

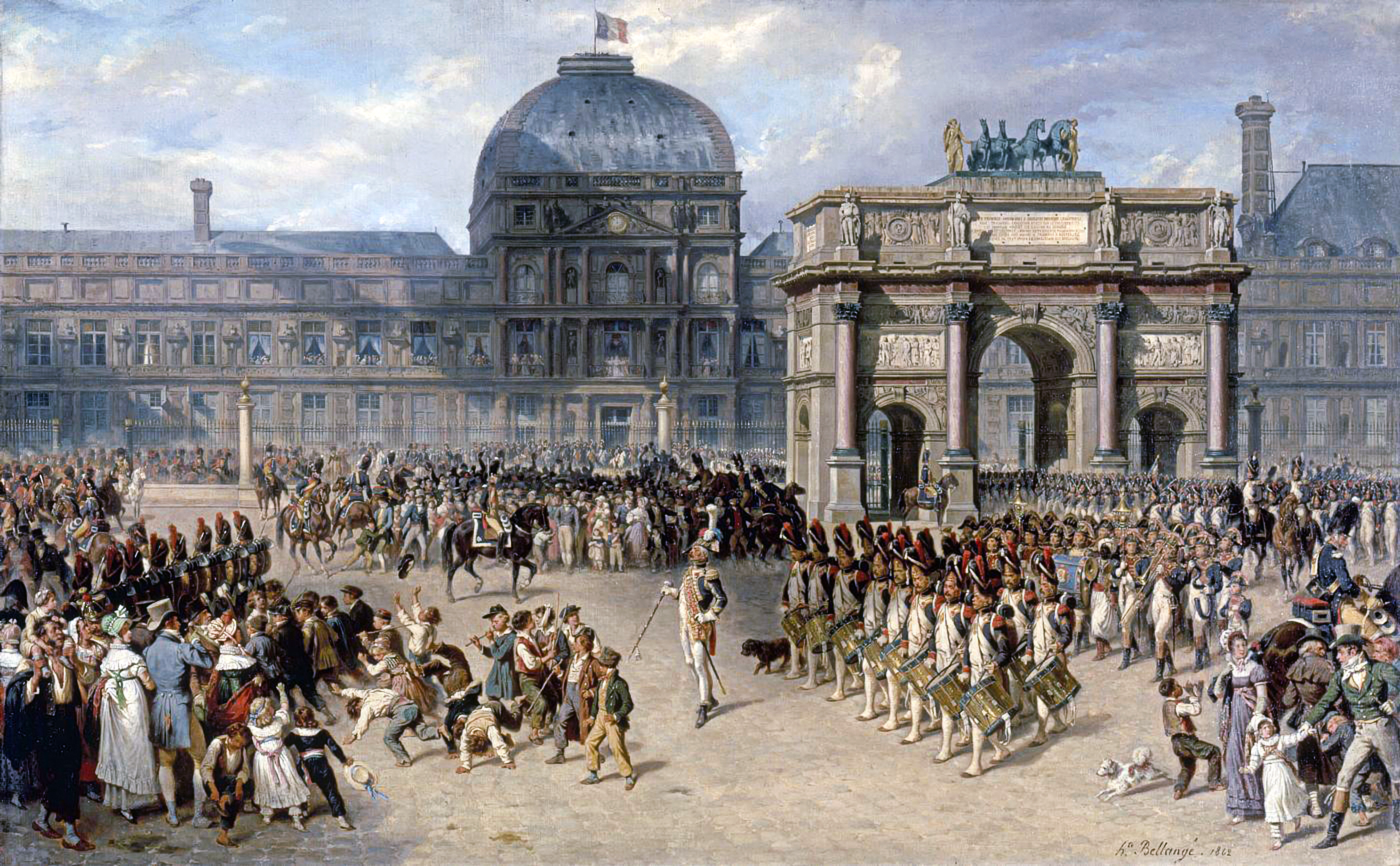
A military review at the Carrousel facing the Tuileries Palace (1810).

- 1810
  - 5 February – For censorship purpose, number of printing houses in Paris limited to fifty.
  - 2 April – Religious ceremony of the marriage of Napoléon to his second wife, Marie-Louise of Austria, in the Salon carré of the Louvre.
  - 4 April – first stone laid for the Palace of the Ministry of Foreign Affairs on the quai d'Orsay. It was completed in 1838.
  - 15 August – Completion of the Place Vendôme column, made of 1200 captured Russian and Austrian cannons
  - Catacombs renovated.
- 1811
  - Population: 624,000
  - 20 March – Birth of Napoléon François Charles Joseph Bonaparte, King of Rome, son of Napoléon I and empress Marie-Louise, at the Tuileries.
  - 18 September – first battalion of Paris firemen organized.

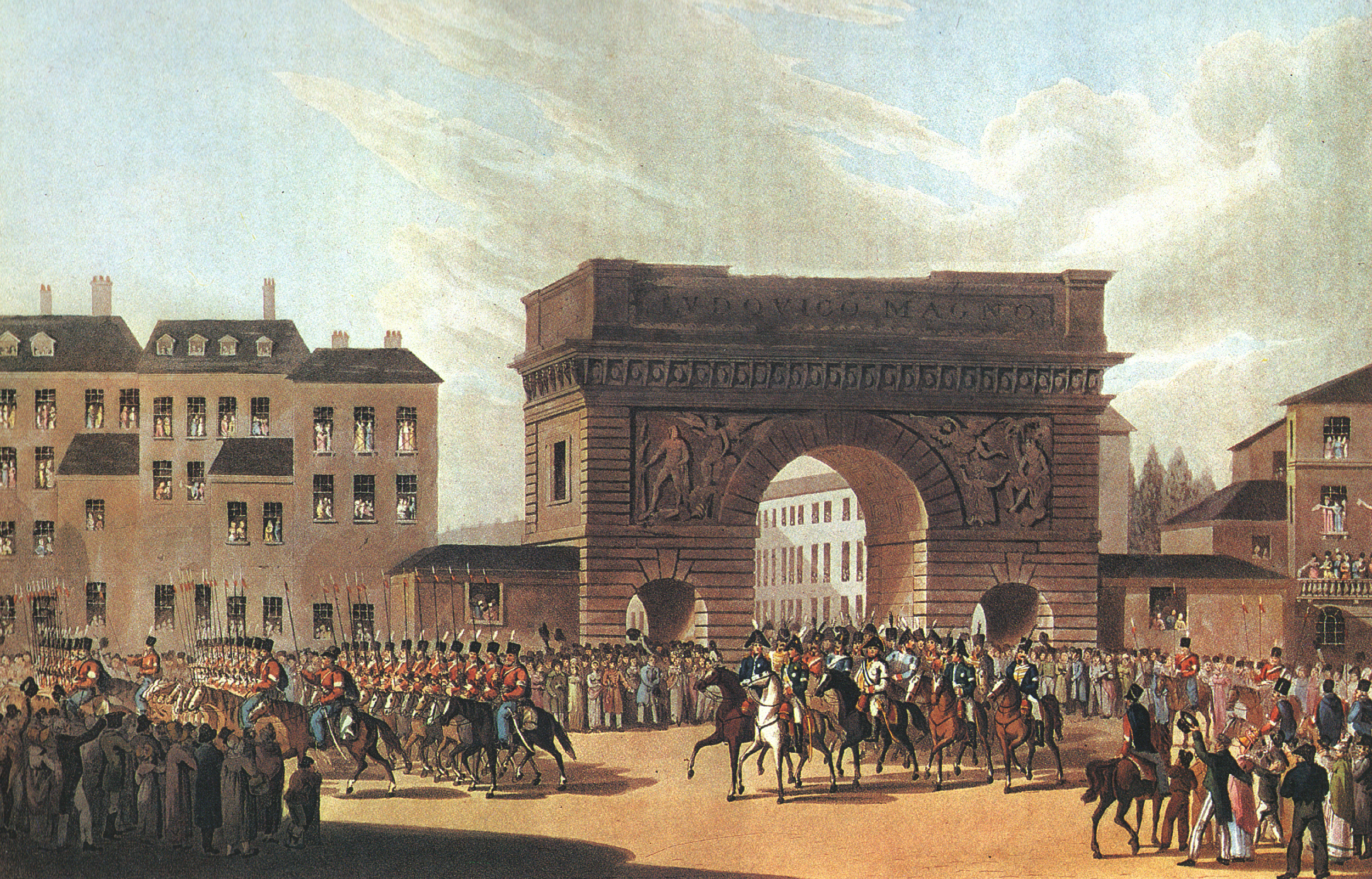
The Russian army enters Paris on 31 March 1814

- 1812
  - The Sûreté, the investigative bureau of the Paris police, founded by Eugène François Vidocq.
  - 1 March – Water from Paris fountains is made free of charge.
- 1814
  - 30 March – The Battle of Paris. The city is defended by Marmont and Mortier, and is surrendered at 2 a.m. on 31 March.
  - 31 March – Czar Alexander I of Russia and King Frederick William III of Prussia enter Paris, at the head of their armies.
  - 6 April – Abdication of Napoleon. The French Senate appeals to King Louis XVIII to take the crown.
  - 3 May – Louis XVIII enters Paris, occupied by the allied armies.
- 1815
  - 19 March – Louis XVIII leaves Paris at midnight, and Napoleon returns on the 20th, the beginning of the Hundred Days.
  - After the battle of Waterloo, Paris is again occupied, this time by the Seventh Coalition.
  - Hôtel Meurice opens for business.

=== 1815–1830 – The Restoration ===
- 1816
  - 21 March – Reopening of the French academies, purged of twenty-two members named by Napoleon.
  - December – first illumination by gaslight of a café in the Passage des Panoramas.
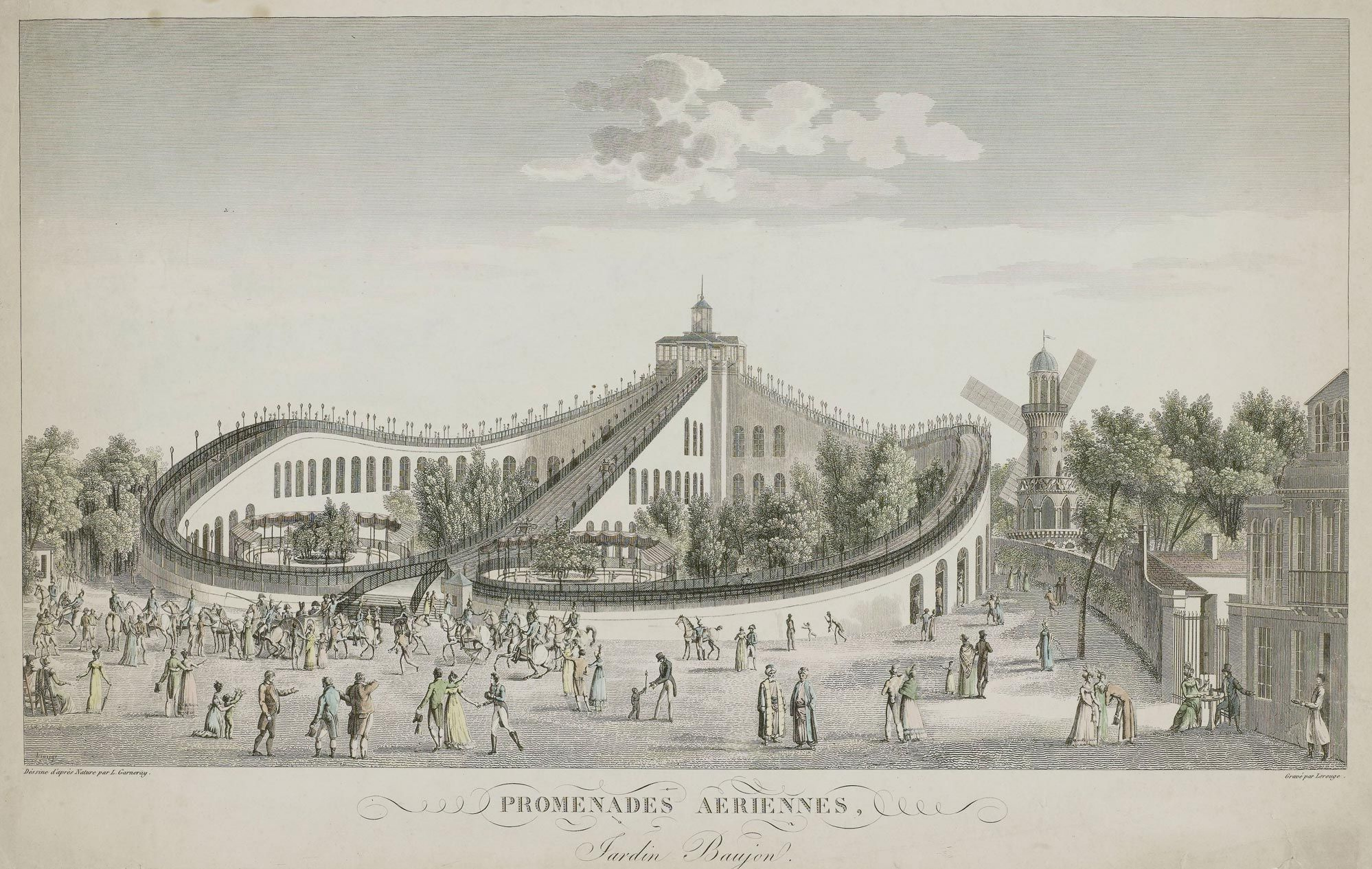
    The first roller-coaster in Paris (1817).
- 1817 – Population: 714,000
  - 1 June – Opening of the Marché Saint-Germain.
  - 8 July – Opening of the first promenades aériennes, or roller coaster, in the jardin Beaujon.
- 1818 – New statue of Henry IV placed on the Pont Neuf, to replace the original statue destroyed during the Revolution.

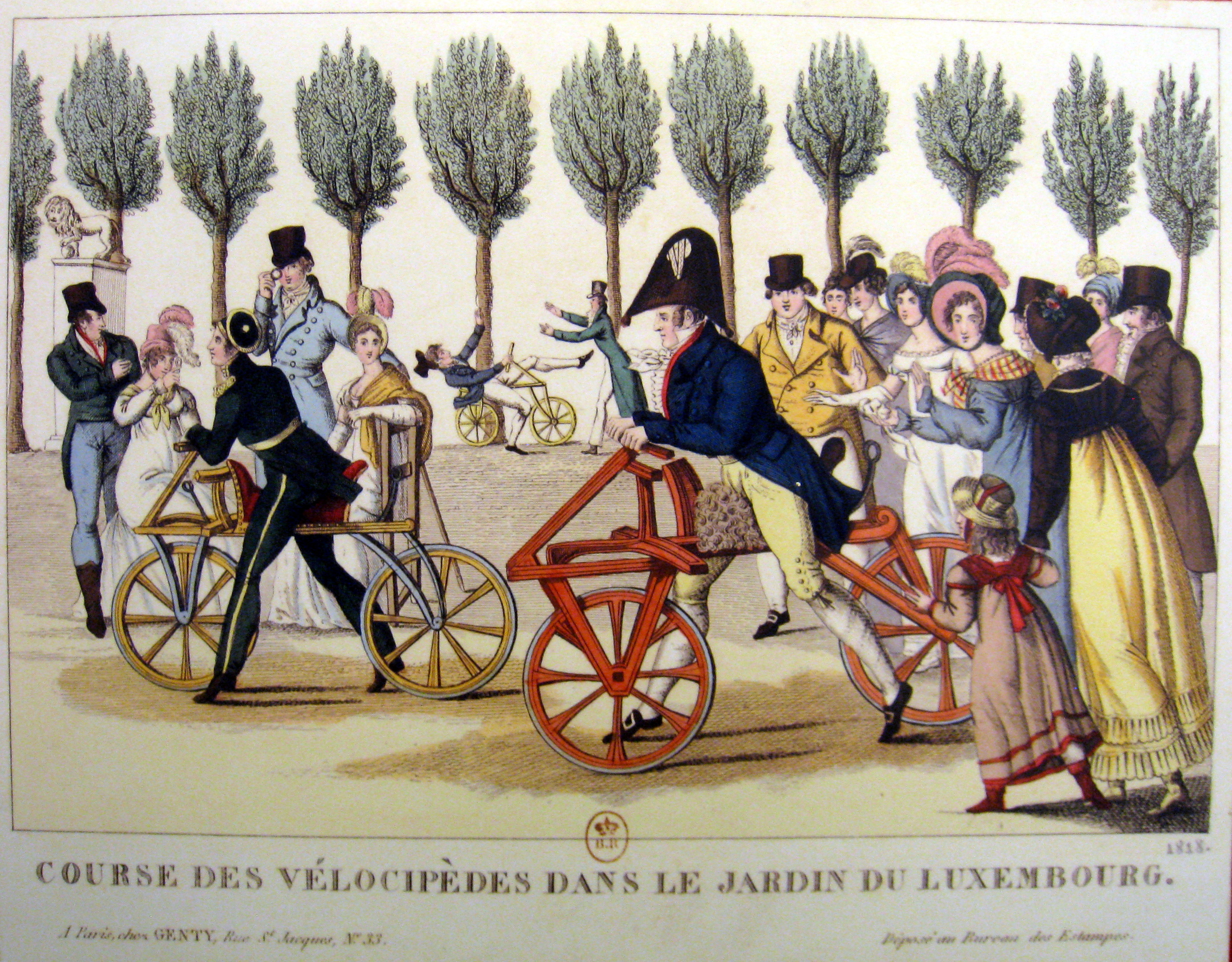
The Draisienne, ancestor of the bicycle, is introduced in the Luxembourg Gardens. (1818)

  - The Draisienne, ancestor of the bicycle, is introduced in the Luxembourg Gardens. (1818)
- 1820
  - March 8 – First stone laid for the École des Beaux-Arts.
  - First student demonstrations against the royal government.
  - December 20 – Académie royale de Médecine (now the Académie nationale de Médecine) founded by royal ordinance.
- 1821
  - 14 May 1821 – Opening of the canal of Saint-Denis.
  - 23 July – Founding of the Geographic Society of Paris.
  - 26 December – Decree to return the Pantheon to a church, under its previous name of Sainte-Geneviève.
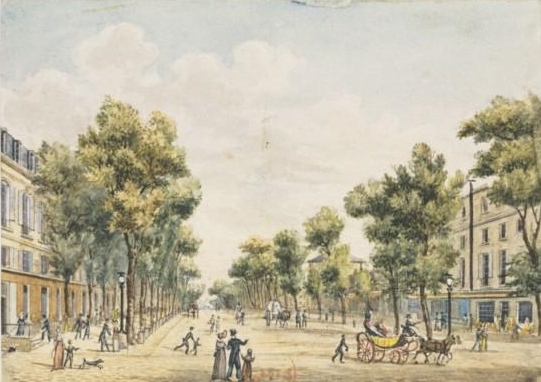
    Boulevard Montmartre in 1822
- 1822
  - 7–8 March – Demonstrations at the law school, two hundred students arrested.
  - 15 July – the Café de Paris opens at corner of the boulevard des Italiens and rue Taitbout.
- 1823
  - 5 August – First stone laid for the church of Notre-Dame-de-Lorette.
- 1824
  - 25 August – First stone laid for the church of Saint-Vincent-de-Paul.
  - October – Opening of À la Belle Jardinière clothing store, ancestor of the modern department store.
  - 13 December – La Fille d'honneur on rue de la Monnaie is the first store to put price tags on merchandise.
- 1825
  - The Coronation of Charles X. While the monarch is crowned in Reims Cathedral, much of the celebrations take place in Paris.
  - Canal Saint-Martin opened.
- 1826
  - First steamboat service begins between Paris and Saint-Cloud.
  - Hachette publishing house founded.
  - 16 July – The founding of Le Figaro newspaper.
  - 4 November – the new Paris Bourse opens.
- 1827
  - 12 March – New law passed restricting freedom of the press.
  - 30 March – Students demonstrate during funeral of the Duke of La Rochefoucault-Liancourt. His coffin is smashed during the struggle.
  - 29 April – During review of the Paris National Guard by King Charles X, the soldiers greet him with anti-government slogans. The King dissolves the National Guard.
  - 30 June – A giraffe, a gift of the Pasha of Egypt to Charles X, and the first-ever seen in Paris, is put on display in the Jardin des Plantes.
  - 19–20 November – political demonstrations around the legislative elections; street barricades go up in the Saint-Denis and Saint-Martin neighborhoods.
  - Galerie Colbert (shopping arcade) opens.
- 1828
  - Guerlain perfumer in business.
  - February – Concert Society of the Paris Conservatory founded. The first concert took place on 9 March.
  - 11 April – Introduction of service by the omnibus, carrying 18 to 25 passengers. Fare was 25 centimes.
- 1829
  - 1 January – The rue de la Paix becomes the first street in Paris lit by gaslight.
  - 12 March – Creation of the sergents de ville, the first uniformed Paris police force. Originally one hundred in number, they were mostly former army sergeants. They carried a cane during the day, and a sword at night.

=== 1830–1847 – The Reign of Louis-Philippe ===
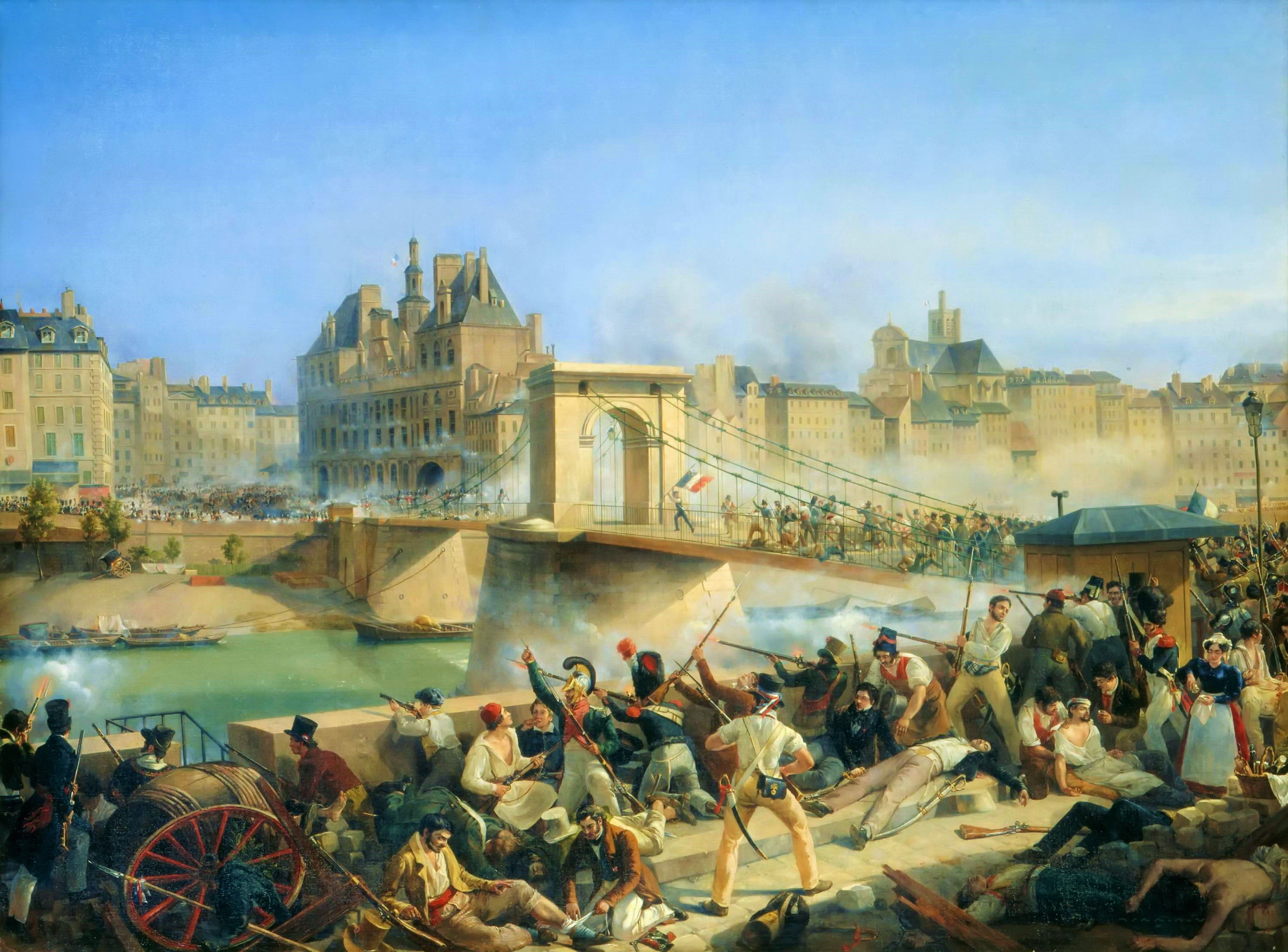
King Charles X is overthrown during the French Revolution of 1830 (27–29 July 1830).

- 1830
  - 25 February – Pandemonium in the audience at the Théâtre Français, between the supporters of the classical style and those of the new romantic style, during the first performance of Victor Hugo's romantic drama Hernani.
  - 16 March – Two hundred twenty deputies send a message to king Charles X criticizing his governance.
  - July – First vespasiennes, or public urinals, also serving as advertising kiosks, appear on Paris boulevards.
  - 25 July – Charles X issues ordinances dissolving the national assembly, changing the election law and suppressing press freedom.
  - 27–29 July – The Trois Glorieuses, three days of street battles between the army and opponents of the government. The insurgents install a provisional government in the Hôtel de Ville. Charles X leaves Saint-Cloud, his summer residence.
  - 9 August – the Duke of Orléans, Louis-Philippe, is sworn King of the French.
- 1831
  - Population – 785,000
  - 27 July – First stone laid of the column in the Place de la Bastille, honoring those killed during the 1830 revolution.
  - 31 October – Louis Philippe moves from the Palais-Royal to the Tuileries Palace.
  - Victor Hugo's novel Hunchback of Notre-Dame published, reviving interest in medieval Paris.
- 1832
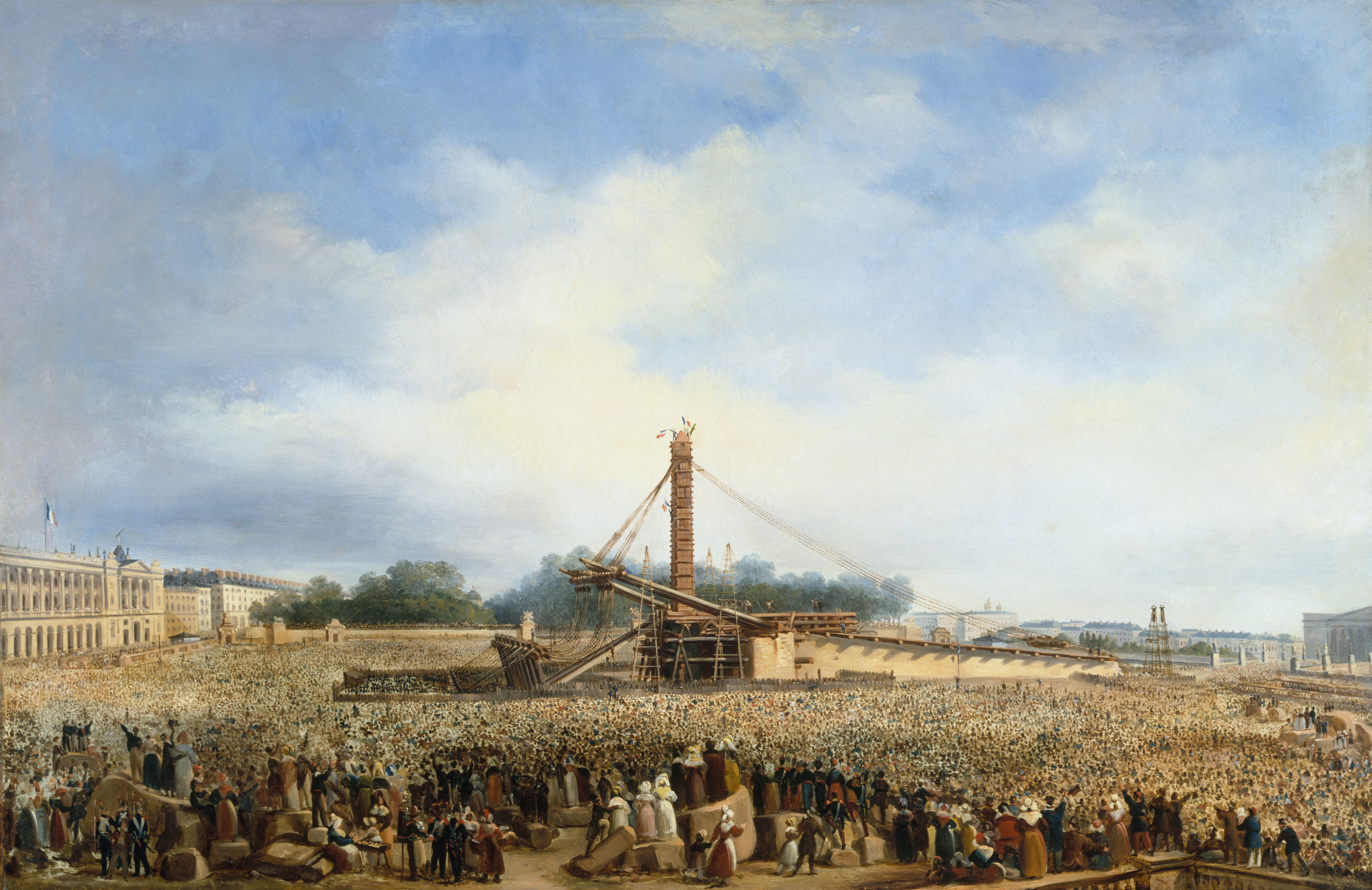
  Luxor obelisk is hoisted into place on the Place de la Concorde (25 October 1836).
  - 19 February. First deaths from cholera epidemic. Between 29 March and 1 October, the disease kills 18,500 persons.
  - Havas news agency in business.
  - Feminist La Femme libre published in Paris.
  - The illustrated Le Charivari newspaper begins publication.
- 1833
  - Society of Saint Vincent de Paul founded.
- 1834
  - 30 October – The pont du Carrousel opens.
- 1835
  - 28 November – Assassination attempt on Louis-Philippe by Giuseppe Marco Fieschi, using an "infernal machine" of twenty gun barrels firing at once, as the king is riding on the Boulevard du Temple. The king is unharmed, but eighteen people are killed.
- 1836
  - Founding of two popular inexpensive newspapers, La Presse and Le Siècle.
  - 29 July Arc de Triomphe dedicated.
  - 25 October – Dedication of the obelisk of Luxor on the Place de la Concorde.
  - Petite Roquette Prison built.
- 1837
  - 26 August – First railroad line opens between the rue de Londres and Saint-Germain-en-Laye. The trip takes half an hour.
- 1838
  - Louis Daguerre takes the first modern photograph, a Daguerreotype View of the Boulevard du Temple, showing a man while his shoes were being shined, the man stood motionless long enough to be photographed.
  - The Bibliothèque Polonaise de Paris (Polish Library) is founded.
- 1839
  - 7 January – Louis Daguerre presents his pioneer work on photography at the French Academy of Sciences. The academy gives him a pension, and publishes the technology for free use by anyone in the world.
  - 12–13 May – Followers of Louis Blanqui begin armed uprising in attempt to overthrow government, but are quickly arrested by the army and national guard.
  - 2 August – Opening of railway line along the Seine between Paris and Versailles.
- 1840
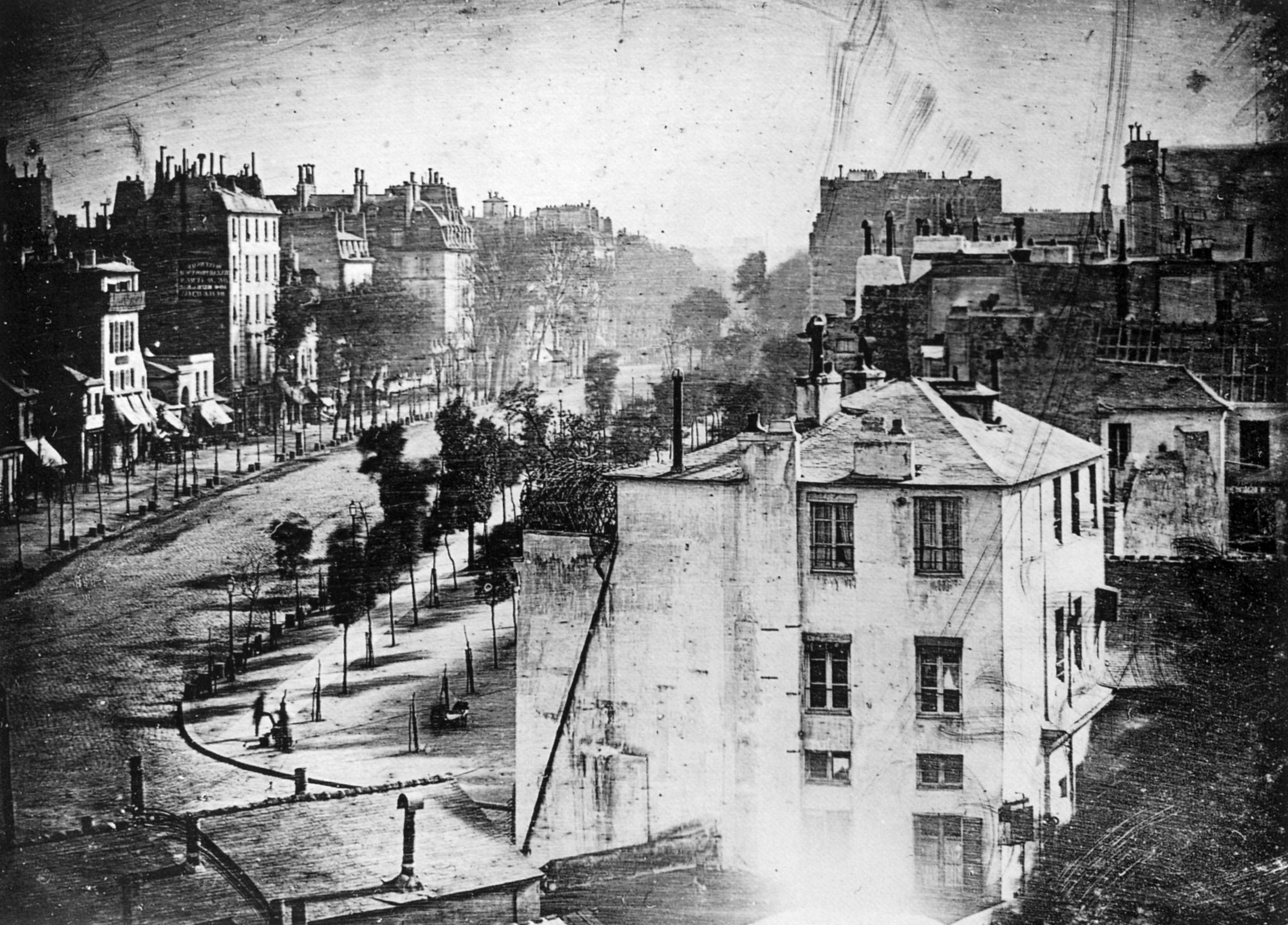
  View of the Boulevard du Temple, one of the first photos of Paris, taken by Louis Daguerre (1838).
  - 16 May – Opening of the new hall of the Opéra-Comique on Place Favart.
  - 14 June – During a review of the national guard by Louis-Philippe at the Carrousel, the soldiers shout slogans demanding reform.
  - 28 July – Dedication of the July Column on the Place de la Bastille, honoring those killed during the Revolution of 1830.
  - 15 December – Napoleon's ashes are placed in the crypt of the church of Les Invalides
  - 24 December – Custom of the Christmas tree is introduced to Paris by the German princess Helene of Mecklenburg-Schwerin, wife of the Duke of Orléans, Louis-Philippe's eldest son.
- 1841 – Population: 935,000
  - 27 February – First artesian wells, 560 meters deep, go into service at Grenelle to provide drinking water.
  - 3 April 1841 – Law passed enabling the construction of the 33 kilometre Thiers wall fortification to encircle Paris.
- 1842
  - First French cigarettes manufactured at Gros-Caillou, in the 7th arrondissement.
- 8 May – First major railroad accident in France, on the Paris-Versailles line at Meudon, kills fifty seven persons and injures three hundred.
- 1843
  - 4 March – L'Illustration newspaper, modeled on The Illustrated London News, begins publication.
  - 2 May – Opening of railroad line from Paris to Orléans, followed the next day by the opening of the line from Paris to Rouen.
  - 7 July – Opening of the quai Henry-IV, created by attaching the Île Louviers to the right bank.
  - 20 October – First experiment with electric street lighting on the Place de la Concorde.
- 1844
  - 16 March – Opening of the Cluny Museum dedicated to the history of medieval Paris.
  - 14 November – First crèche, or day care center, is opened at Chaillot.
- 1845
  - Ring of new fortifications around the city, (the Thiers wall), begun in 1841, completed.
  - 27 April – First electric telegraph line tested between Paris and Rouen.
  - 29 November – First stone laid of the Ministry of Foreign Affairs on the Quai d'Orsay.
- 1846
  - Population: 1,053,000
  - 7 January – Completion of the first Gare du Nord railway station. Train service to the north of France begins 14 June.
  - 30 September – A riot breaks out in the faubourg Saint-Antoine over the high cost of bread.
- 1847
  - 19 February – Alexandre Dumas opens his new Théâtre Historique, located boulevard du Temple, with the premiere of La Reine Margot.
  - 28 June – City government decrees installation of new street numbers, in white numbers on enameled blue porcelain plaques. These numbers remain until 1939.
  - 9 July – Opponents of the government hold the first of a series of large banquets, the Campagne des banquets, to defy the law forbidding political demonstrations.

=== 1848–1869 – The Second Republic and the Second Empire ===
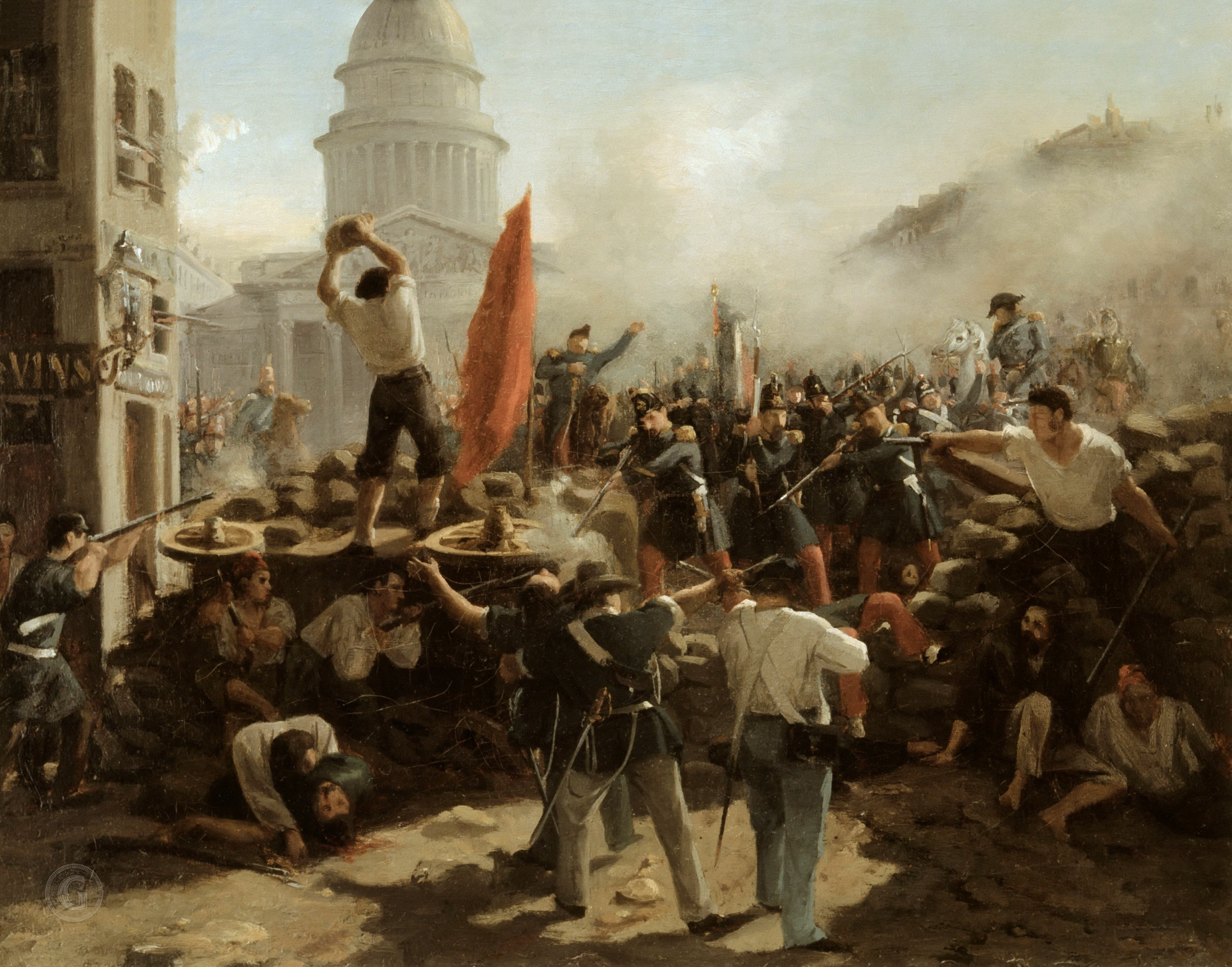
Barricades on Rue Soufflot in June, 1848

- 1848
  - February 24 – 22-24 1848 French Revolution.
  - 22 February – Government bans banquets of the political opposition.
  - 23 February – Crowds demonstrate against Louis-Philippe's Prime Minister, Guizot. That evening soldiers fire on a crowd outside Guizot's residence, boulevard des Capucines, killing 52.
  - 24 February – Barricades appear in many neighborhoods. The government resigns, Louis-Philippe and his family flee into exile in England, and the Second Republic is proclaimed at the Hôtel de Ville.
  - 22–26 June – Armed uprising by the more radical republicans in the working-class neighborhoods of eastern Paris, suppressed by the army under General Louis-Eugène Cavaignac. The city remains under martial law until 19 October.
  - 2 August – The first tourist excursion train to the beach at Dieppe leaves Paris. This begins the tradition of leaving Paris for summer holidays in August.
  - 20 December – Louis-Napoléon Bonaparte becomes the first and only president of the short-lived French Second Republic, and moves into the Élysée Palace.
- 1849
  - 3 March – new cholera epidemic begins in the overcrowded center of the city. Between March and September, sixteen thousand deaths.
  - 8 May – First stone placed for first public housing for workers in Paris, the cité ouvrière on rue de Rochechouart.
  - 13 June – Armed uprising by radical republicans in the Saint-Martin district against the government of the Second Republic, led by Ledru-Rollin. It was suppressed by the army, causing eight deaths.
  - 3 July – Inauguration of the train line, operated by the Compagnie du chemin de fer de Paris à Strasbourg, opens between Paris and Strasbourg in eastern France.
  - 12 August – Inauguration of the train line between Paris and Lyon.
  - International Peace Congress held.
- 1850
  - 19 May – opening of Mazas prison.
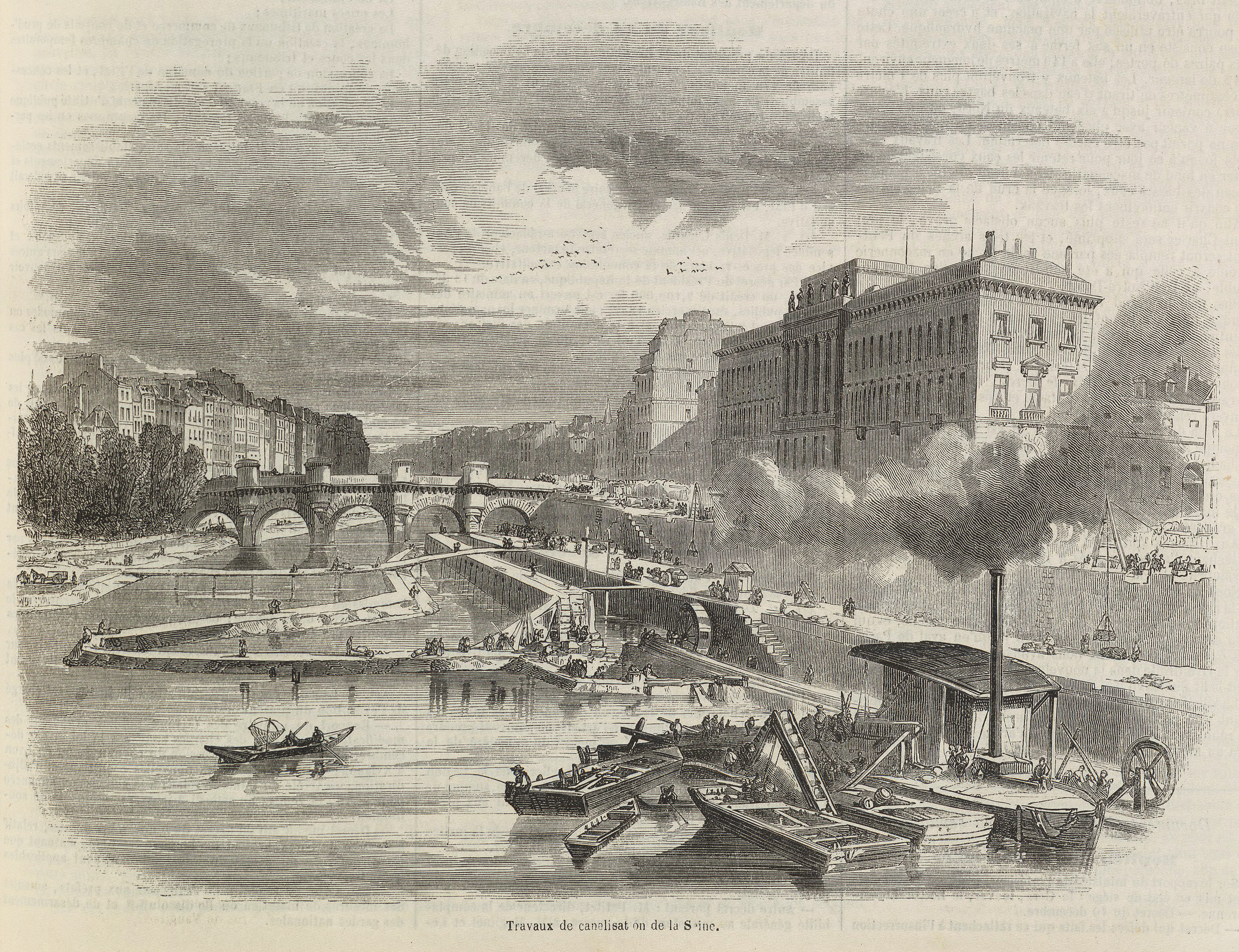
    Building the stone banks of the Seine, begun in 1840, underway in 1851
- 1851
  - 5 June – Louis-Napoleon lays first stone for the new central market of Les Halles.
  - 2 December – Louis-Napoleon, not allowed by the Constitution to run for re-election, seizes power through a coup d'état and moves his residence to the Tuileries Palace. There is sporadic opposition in the Faubourg Saint-Antoine and neighborhood of the temple, quickly subdued by the army.
  - 10 December – Decree of Louis-Napoleon to begin building the ceinture railroad line around the city, 38 kilometers long. The line was finished in 1870.
- 1852
  - 26 March – A decree allows the government to more easily expropriate old buildings and the adjacent land in order to build new boulevards through the center of Paris.
  - 25 July – Work begins on Napoleon III's Louvre expansion.
  - 2 December – Louis-Napoleon is proclaimed Emperor Napoleon III.
  - 11 December – The opening of the Cirque Napoléon, later called the Cirque d'hiver, on the boulevard du Temple.
  - Work begins on the Bois de Boulogne, completed in 1858.
  - Aristide Boucicaut and the Videau brothers open Le Bon Marché, the first modern Paris department store. The store has twelve employees in 1852, and 1,788 in 1877.
- 1853
  - 29 June – Napoleon III installs a huge map of Paris in his office at the Tuileries Palace and he and his new prefect of the Seine, Georges-Eugène Haussmann, begin planning the reconstruction of central Paris.
  - 21 November – A demonstration of the first tram line between the modern avenue de New York and the Cours-la-Reine. A line is later opened connecting Place de la Concorde with the pont de Sèvres.
- 1854
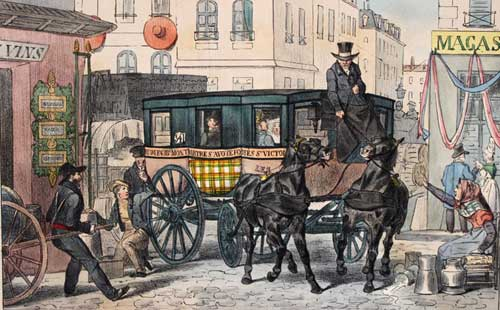
  A Paris omnibus in the early 1850s
  - Louis Vuitton opens a luggage shop on Rue Neuve des Capucines, and in 1858 introduces a line of flat-bottomed canvas trunks, convenient for stacking.
  - 15 November – Société française de photographie founded by a group of French scientists. Its first president was the chemist Henri Victor Regnault.
  - 2 April – The newspaper Le Figaro is revived under new management and begins publishing.
- 1855
  - 22 February – Private omnibus companies consolidated into the Compagnie générale des omnibus to provide public transport throughout the city.
  - 26 March – The department store Les Galeries du Louvre opens.
  - 15 May – The Exposition Universelle (1855) opens between the Seine and the Champs-Élysées. By the time it closes on 15 November, it has attracted five million visitors.
  - 19 July – The Compagnie parisienne d'éclairage is formed, with a monopoly for providing gas distribution. The company installs thousands of new gaslights along the city streets.
  - 11 August – Napoleon III decrees the construction of boulevard Saint-Michel and boulevard Saint-Germain on the left bank.
  - Journal pour tous begins publication.
  - Bouillon Duval soup restaurant opens.
- 1856
  - Population: 1,174,000
  - 11 October – Inauguration of the train line Paris to Marseille.
  - February 5 to March 31 – Congress of Paris; European leaders meet to bring an end to the Crimean War.
- 1857
  - Inauguration of the Bazar de l'Hôtel de Ville (BHV) department store.
  - 26 April – Opening of the Hippodrome de Lonchamp race track.
  - 14 August – Inauguration of Napoleon III's Louvre expansion.
  - 29 August – Napoleon III decrees the building of Avenue des Amandiers (now Avenue de la République) and Boulevard Prince-Eugène (now Boulevard Voltaire).
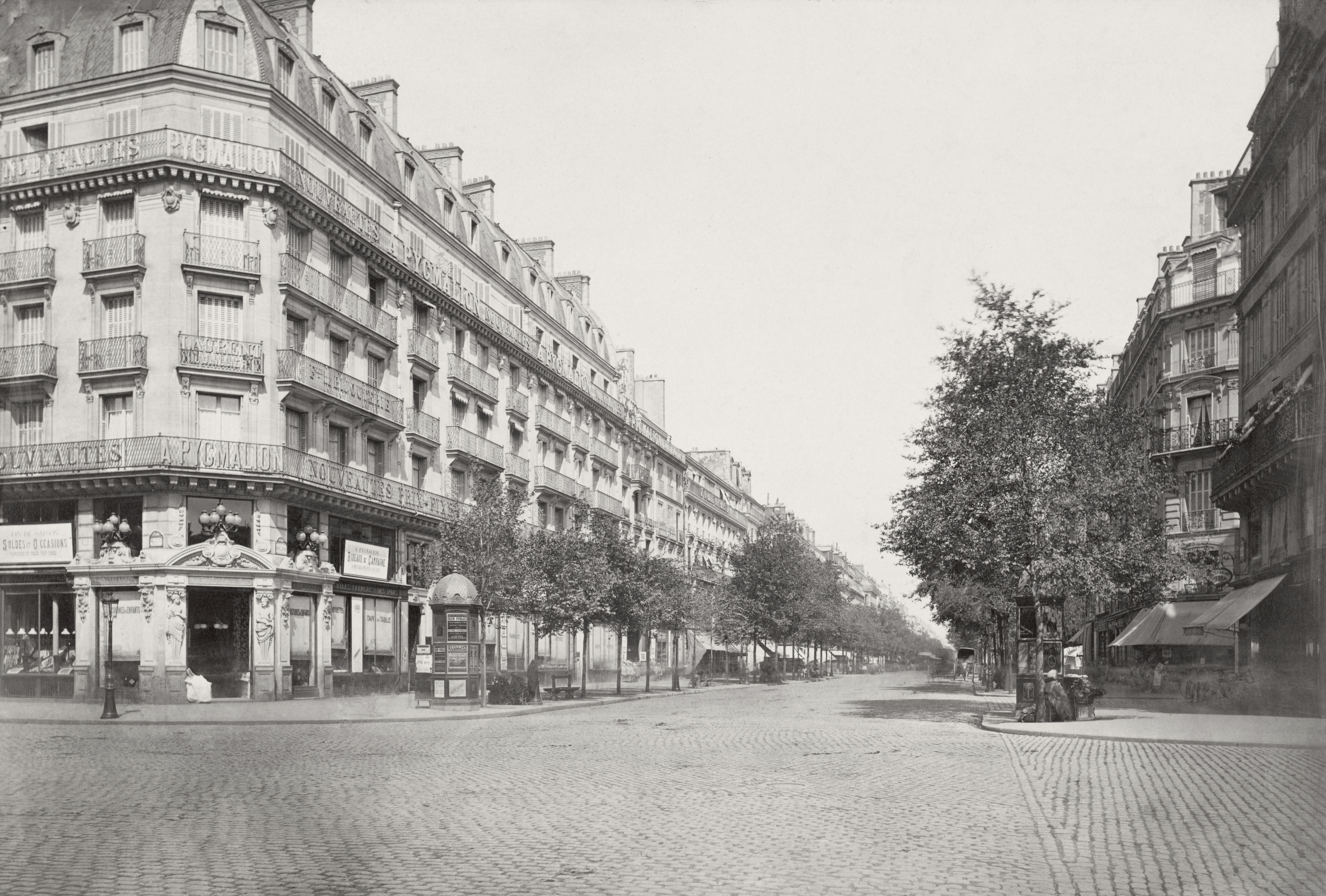
    The new Boulevard de Sébastopol, opened by Napoleon III in 1858.
- 1858
  - 14 January – Bomb attack on Emperor Napoleon III by Orsini, an Italian nationalist, outside the Paris Opera. The Emperor is unharmed, but 156 persons are killed or injured.
  - 5 April – Inauguration of Boulevard de Sébastopol, the new north–south axis of Napoleon III's urban plan.
  - Opening of the House of Worth, the shop of Charles Frederick Worth, the couturier for Empress Eugénie, at 7 rue de la Paix.
- 1859
  - 17 February – Napoleon III decrees the annexation of the faubourgs, which were small communes lying between the Mur des Fermiers généraux and the Thiers wall, effective January 1, 1860.
  - 16 June – decree creating twenty arrondissements for the future enlarged city.
  - 22 June – Decree by Haussmann that, along boulevards and streets at least twenty meters wide, buildings can be as high as twenty meters, but must not have more than five floors. This, along with standards for uniform façade design, material and color, gives the distinct Haussmann look to Paris boulevards.
  - Premiere of Gounod's opera Faust.
- 1860
  - 1 January – The annexation takes effect, adding eight new arrondissements. Auteuil, Batignolles, Belleville, Bercy, La Chapelle, Charonne, Grenelle, Ménilmontant, Montmartre, Montrouge, Passy, Vaugirard, La Villette become part of city.
  - Population: 1,696,000, including those in the new arrondissements.
  - Napoleon III buys the land of Parc Monceau and makes it into a public park, opened in 1861.
  - 15 August – Inauguration of Fontaine Saint-Michel.
  - 15 August – Inauguration of the new pont au Change bridge rebuilt on the site of the previous one.
  - Work begins on the Bois de Vincennes, to give green space and recreation to neighborhoods on the east side of the city. Completed in 1865.
  - 6 October – Opening of the Jardin d'acclimatation.
- 1861
  - 13 August – Inauguration of boulevard Malesherbes.
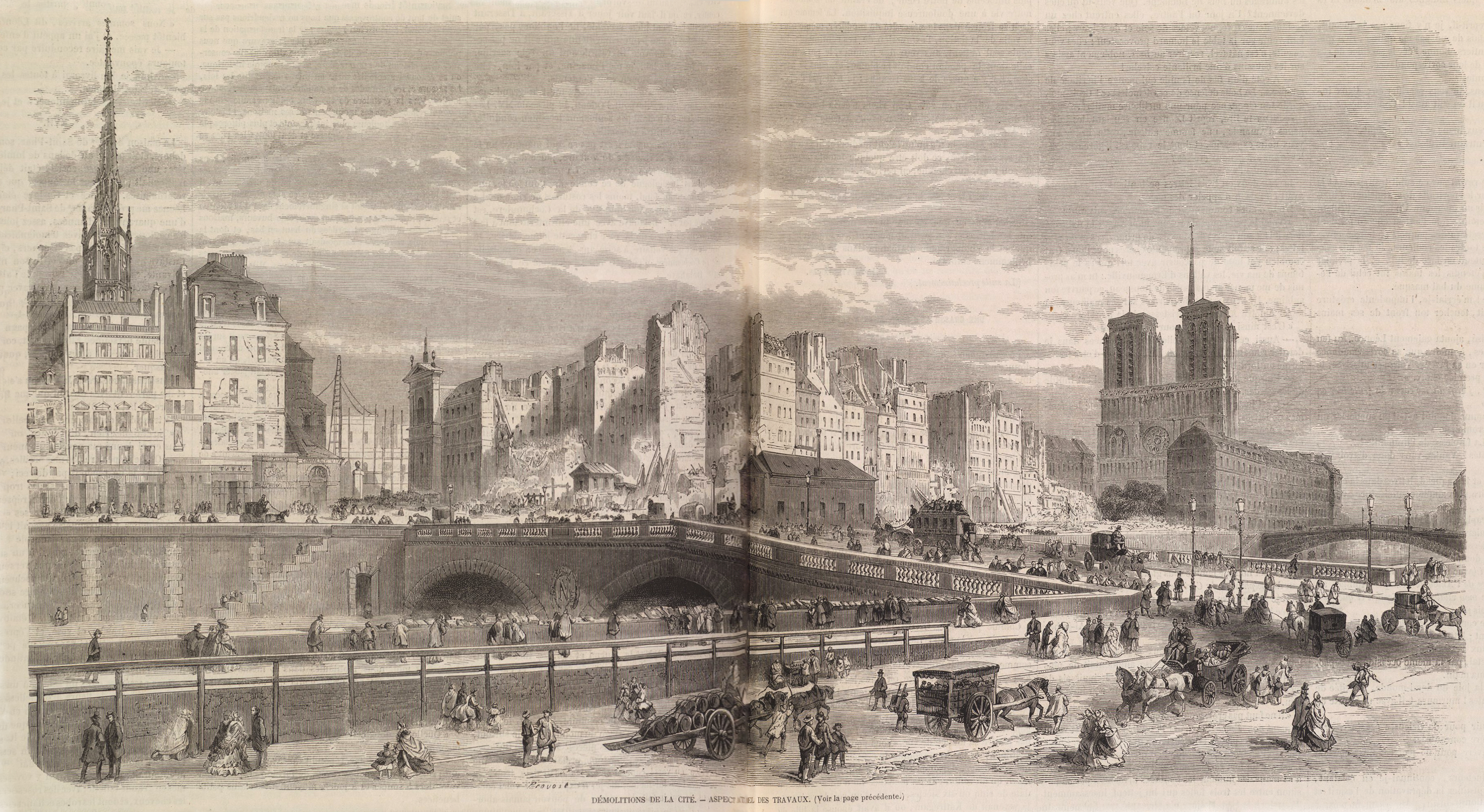
    Demolition of the old neighborhoods on Île de la Cité (1862).
- 1862
  - Café de la Paix opens.
  - 21 July – first stone laid for the new Palais Garnier designed by Charles Garnier. It did not open until 5 January 1875.
  - 19 August – Inauguration of the Cirque Olympique (now Théâtre du Châtelet)
  - 30 October – Inauguration of the Théâtre Lyrique, facing the Cirque Olympique on Place du Châtelet.
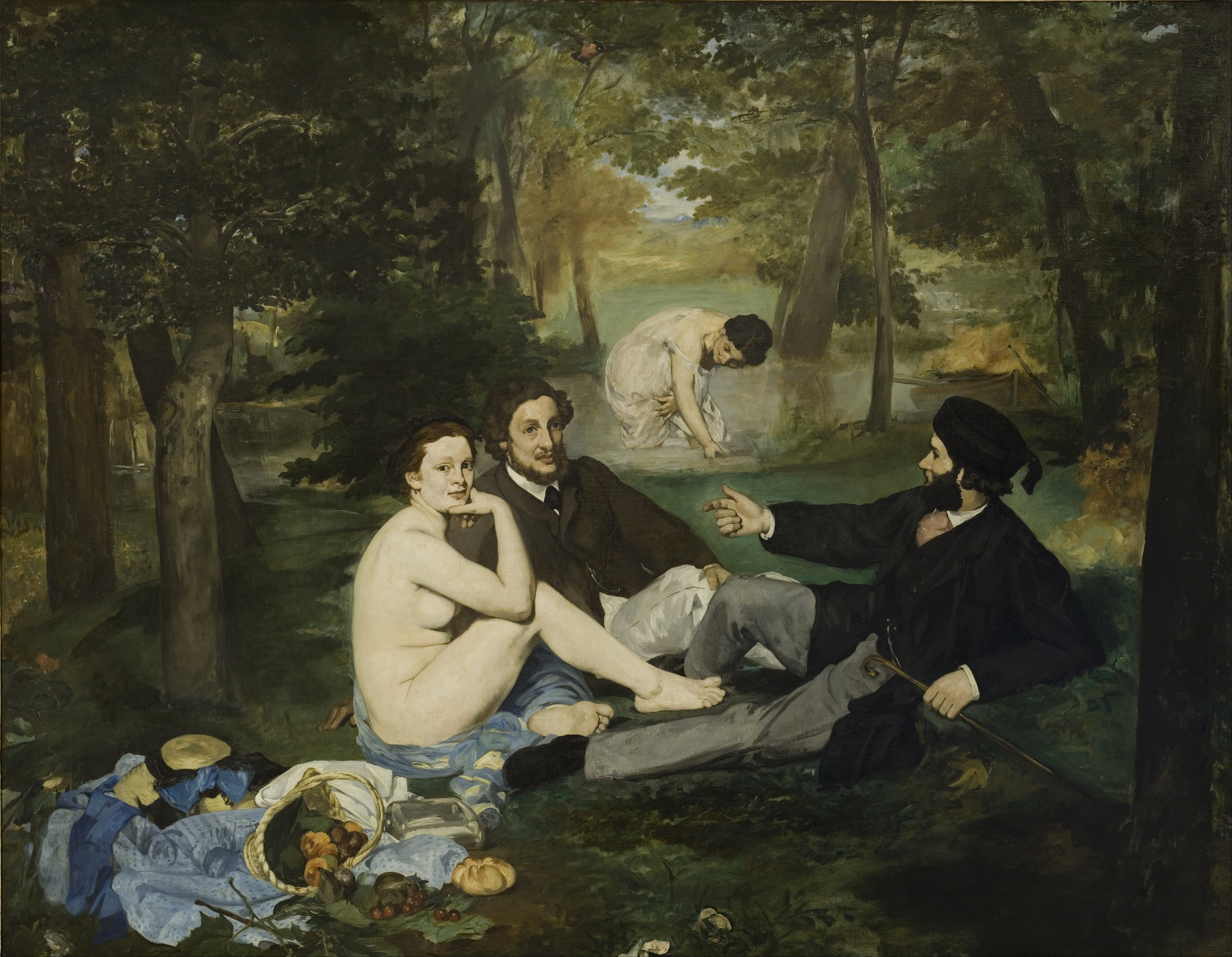
    Manet's painting Le Déjeuner sur l'herbe causes a scandal at the Salon des Refusés (1863)
- 1863
  - Le Petit Journal newspaper begins publication.
  - Salon des refusés of paintings rejected by the Salon officiel brings work by Édouard Manet and others to public attention.
- 1864
  - Société Générale bank opens.
  - Bofinger brasserie opens.
  - 20 May – Completion of the restoration of the cathedral of Notre Dame by Viollet-le-Duc.
  - 17 December – Triumphant premiere of La Belle Hélène by Jacques Offenbach at the Théâtre des Variétés.
  - International Telegraph Convention held in city.
- 1865
  - Construction begins of Parc des Buttes-Chaumont, completed in 1867.
  - Construction begins of Parc Montsouris, completed in 1878.
  - 22 September – New cholera epidemic kills four thousand Parisians in two months.
- 1866
  - 2 September – Beer served for first time in Paris at the Café de la Rotonde.
  - 31 October – Premiere of La Vie parisienne by Jacques Offenbach at the Théâtre du Palais-Royal.
  - 4 November – Inauguration of place du Roi de Rome (now place du Trocadéro).
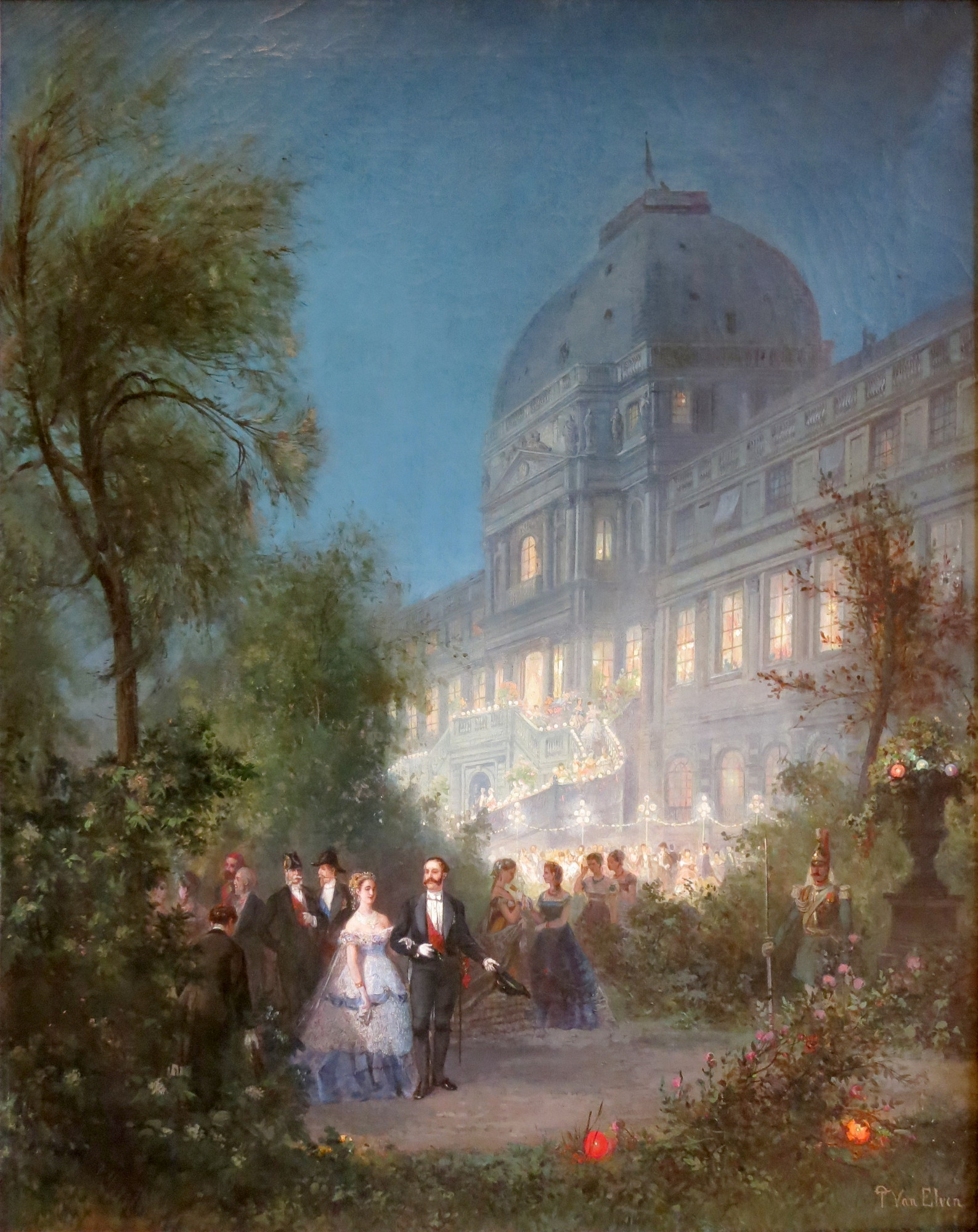
    A fête given by Napoleon III at the Tuileries Palace (1867)
- 1867
  - 15 March – First elevator in France begins service in the store La Ville de Saint-Denis on rue du Faubourg Saint-Denis.
  - 1 April – Opening of the Exposition Universelle (1867) held on the Champ de Mars.
  - The Exposition is the occasion for the opening of many new brasseries in Paris, in imitation of a popular style of restaurant in Germany.
  - 14 April – The first bateaux-mouches excursion boats run on the Seine during the Exposition.
  - International Monetary Conference held.
- 1868
  - 28 May – Consecration of the Saint-Augustin church, the first Paris church with an iron frame.
  - 31 May – First official bicycle racing track opens at the Parc de Saint-Cloud.

=== 1870–1879 The Paris Commune and the Third Republic ===
- 1870
  - 1 January – La Samaritaine department store founded.
  - 5 January – After intense criticism by Parliament, Napoleon III dismisses Haussmann
  - 19 July – France declares war on Prussia, the southern German states immediately side with Prussia. The Franco-Prussian War begins.
  - 28 July – Napoleon III departs Paris to take command of the French army at Metz.
  - 4 September – News reaches Paris that Napoleon III has been captured by the Prussians at Battle of Sedan. The government falls and the Third Republic proclaimed at Hôtel de Ville.
  - 17 September – The Prussian army surrounds the city, and siege of Paris begins.
  - 23 September – first balloon departs the besieged city. By January 28, sixty-six balloons depart with a hundred passengers.
  - 14 November – Message service by carrier pigeons established between Paris and the outside world. The Paris population suffers from cold, hunger and disease.
- 1871
  - January – Prussians bombard Paris with heavy siege guns for twenty-three nights.
  - 28 January – Armistice and capitulation of Paris. Prussians remain in their positions outside the city.
  - 1 March – Prussians hold a brief victory parade on the Champs-Élysées, then withdraw to their positions.
  - 18 March – French army tries to remove 271 cannon from the heights of Montmartre, but is blocked by members of the Paris National Guard. The Guard captures and executes two French generals. The most radical members of the Guard seize the Hôtel de Ville and other strategic points in the city. The army and government withdraw from Paris to Versailles.
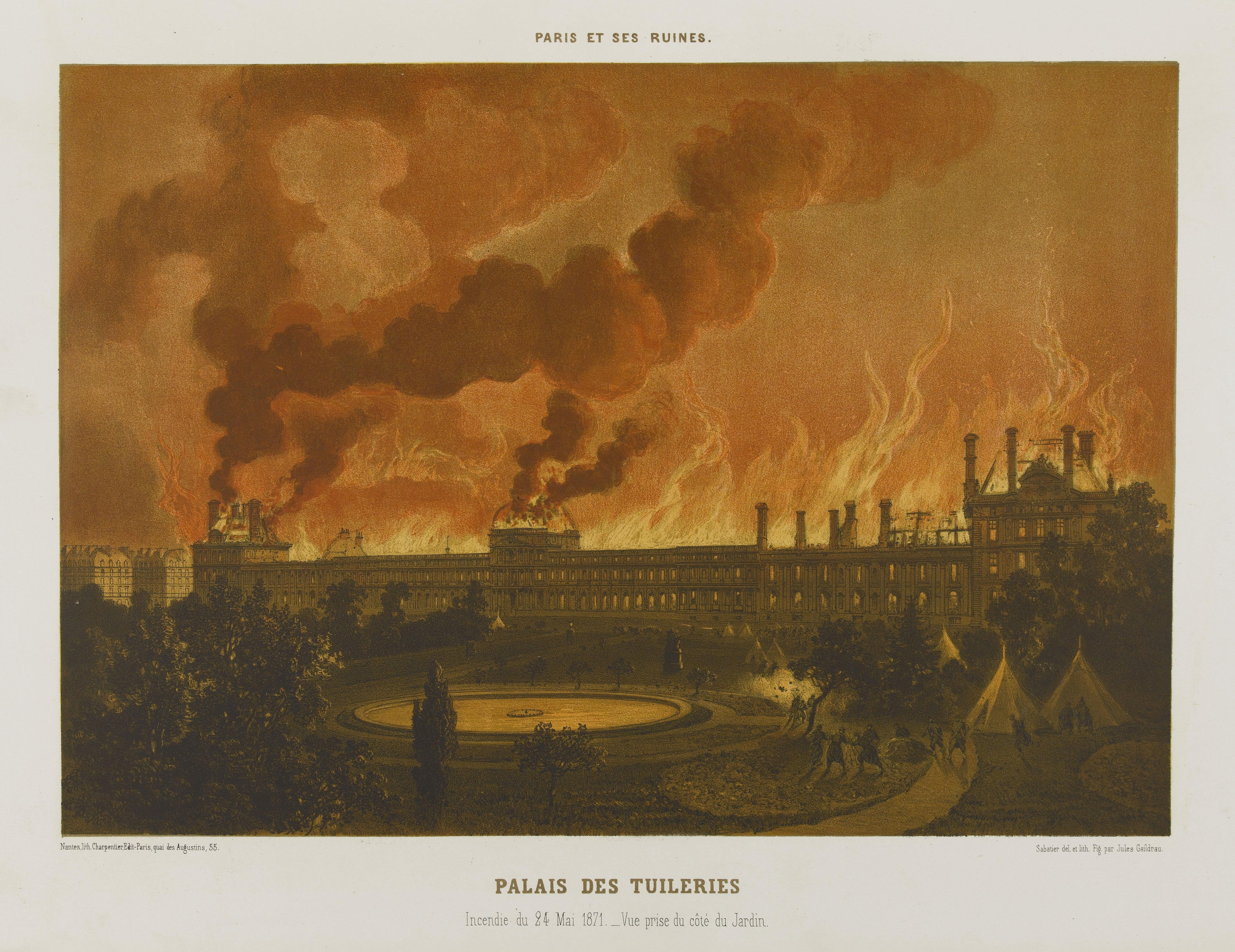
    The burning of the Tuileries Palace by the Paris Commune (24 May 1871)
  - 26 March – Elections for the new Paris Commune, or city council, with low voting in affluent west Paris but high turnout in the working-class neighborhoods. The new council is dominated by anarchists, radical socialists and revolutionary candidates.
  - 27 March – The new Commune officially takes power. It replaces the French tricolor with the red flag and proposes a revolutionary program.
  - 16 May – At the suggestion of Gustave Courbet, the column in the Place Vendôme is pulled down in a civic ceremony.
  - 21–28 May – The Paris Commune is suppressed by the French Army during "The Bloody Week" (La Semaine sanglante) with seven to ten thousand Communards killed in the fighting or executed afterwards and buried in mass graves in the city's cemeteries, and forty three thousand Parisians taken prisoners. The Tuileries Palace, Hôtel de Ville and other government buildings are burned down by the Communards; and the Paris city archives are destroyed. Afterwards, Paris is placed under martial law.
  - September – Installation of the first Wallace fountain, to encourage Parisians to drink water instead of wine or liquor.
- 1872
  - Population: 1,850,000
  - 13 January – opening of the École libre des sciences politiques, or Sciences-Po.
- 1873
- 24 July – Law passed supporting the construction of the Basilica of Sacré-Cœur on Montmartre, financed by private contributions.
- 1874
  - French government returns to Paris. MacMahon, first president of the French Third Republic moves into the Élysée Palace.
  - 7 May – Société de l'histoire de Paris et de l'Île-de-France founded at the École nationale des chartes.
  - 15 April – First Paris exhibit by Impressionist painters in the studio of the photographer Nadar.
  - 12 August – Opening of canal bringing the water of the Vannes river to Paris. Réservoir de Montsouris opened.
- 1875
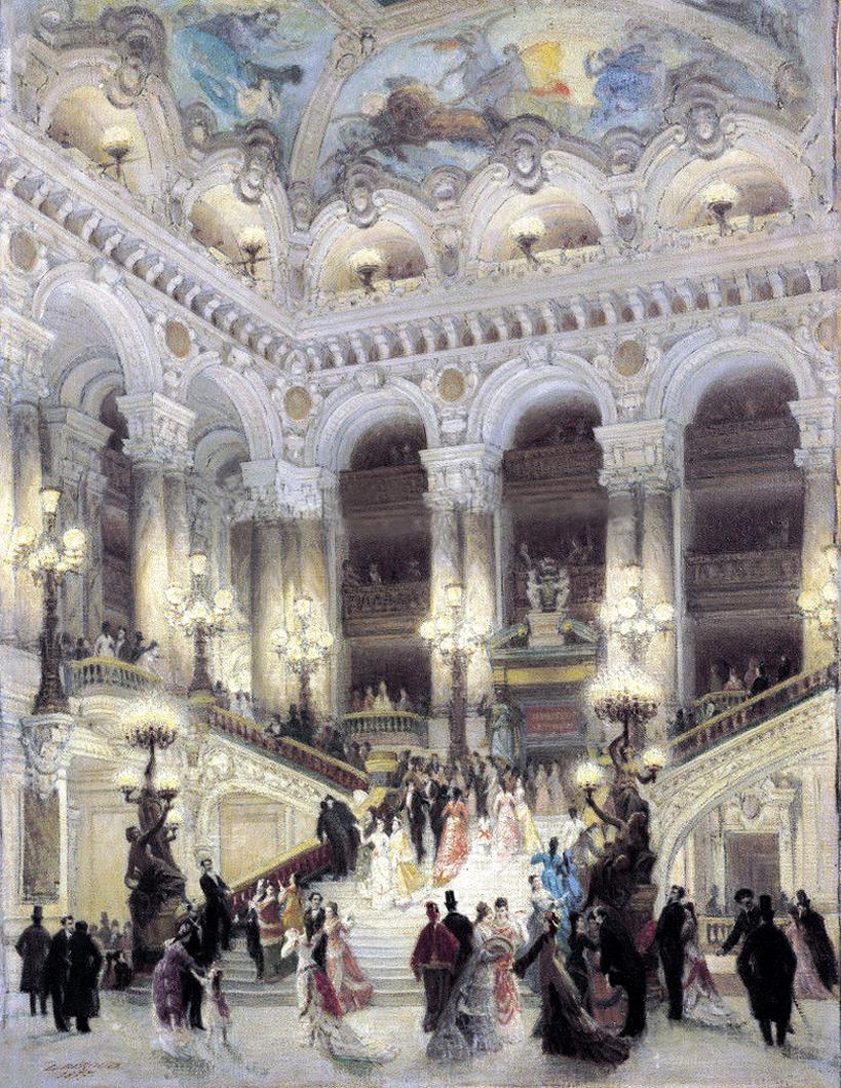
  The Grand stairway of the Paris Opera (1875)
  - 5 January – Opening of the Palais Garnier opera house.
  - 3 March: Premiere of Bizet's opera Carmen.
  - 15 June – first stone placed of the Basilica of Sacré-Cœur.
- 1877
  - Population: 1,985,000
- 1878
  - 1 May – Opening of the Exposition Universelle (1878) held at the Trocadero Palace and on the Champ de Mars.
  - 30 May – The first test of electric lighting on the avenue de l'Opéra and the Place de l'Etoile.
- 1879
  - July – Installation of first telephone system in Paris.

=== 1880–1889 ===
- 1880
  - 3 January – The ice on the Seine thaws suddenly, and the river rises more than two meters in three hours, sweeping away the pont des Invalides, under reconstruction.
  - 10 July – Amnesty for those imprisoned or exiled after the Paris Commune.
  - 14 July – Bastille Day is celebrated officially for the first time since 1802
  - Brasserie des Bords du Rhin opens.
  - The Direction régionale de la police judiciaire de Paris opens its headquarters at 36 Quai des Orfèvres.
  - The History of Paris Carnavalet Museum opens.
- 1881
  - 15 August (through 15 November) – The Exposition internationale d'électricité is held, highlighted by the illumination of the Grands Boulevards with electric lights.
  - 18 August – Opening of the Chat Noir, the first modern cabaret in Montmartre.
- 1882
  - January – Crash of the Union générale bank, causing the Paris Bourse crash of 1882
  - 10 January – Opening of the musée Grévin, the first Paris wax museum, in the passage Jouffroy.
  - 12 April – Inauguration of the ethnographic museum at Trocadéro.
  - 13 July – Opening of the reconstructed Hôtel de Ville, burned by the Commune in 1871.
- 1883
  - 16 June – The Catholic daily newspaper La Croix begins publication.
  - 14 July – Inauguration of the statue Monument à la République on the Place de la République.
  - August – First municipal summer camp for students of the schools of the 9th arrondissement.
  - 22 September – The opening of the first lycée for girls, the Lycée Fénelon.
- 1884
  - 7 March – Decree requiring the use of trash cans, nicknamed poubelles after the Prefect of Paris Eugène Poubelle, who introduced it.
  - 8 July – Opening of the first municipal swimming pool at 31 rue du Château-Landon.
  - 23 July – Law allowing construction of residential buildings up to seven stories high.
  - 7 November – Last serious cholera epidemic in Paris.
  - Students' General Association of Paris founded.
  - Les Deux Magots café opens,
  - Samuel Bing art gallery opens.
  - Premiere of Massenet's opera Manon.'

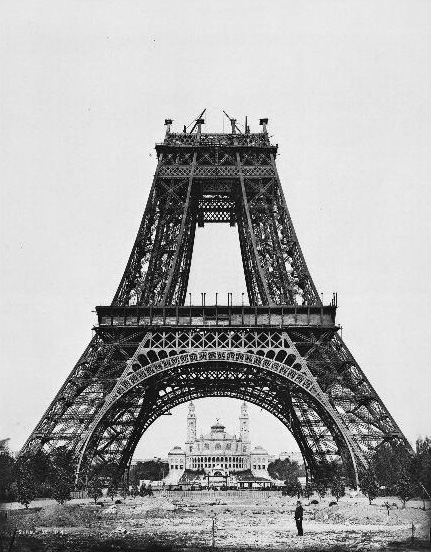
The Eiffel Tower under construction (August 1888)

- 1885
  - 2 February – Municipal Council allows women to work as interns in Paris hospitals.
  - 1 June – Huge crowds observe the funeral procession of Victor Hugo, whose remains are placed in the Panthéon.
  - 3 August – First stone laid for the new buildings of the Sorbonne.
- 1887
  - January – Construction begins of the Eiffel Tower. The structure is strongly condemned by leading Paris writers and artists.
  - 25 May – A fire destroys the Opéra-Comique during a performance of Mignon; more than a hundred persons are killed.
- 1888
  - 14 November – Dedication of the Institut Pasteur by Louis Pasteur.
  - Lycée Molière (Paris) opens.
- 1889
  - First Paris telephone book published.
  - 30 January – First cremation in France at Père Lachaise Cemetery.
  - 2 April – Opening of the Eiffel Tower. Guests must climb to the top by the stairs, because the elevators are not finished until May 19.
  - 6 May – Opening of the Exposition Universelle (1889). Before it closes on 6 November, the Exposition is seen by twenty-five million visitors.
  - 14 July – Socialist Second International founded in Paris.
  - 5 August – Opening of the grand amphitheater of the new Sorbonne.

=== 1890–1899 ===
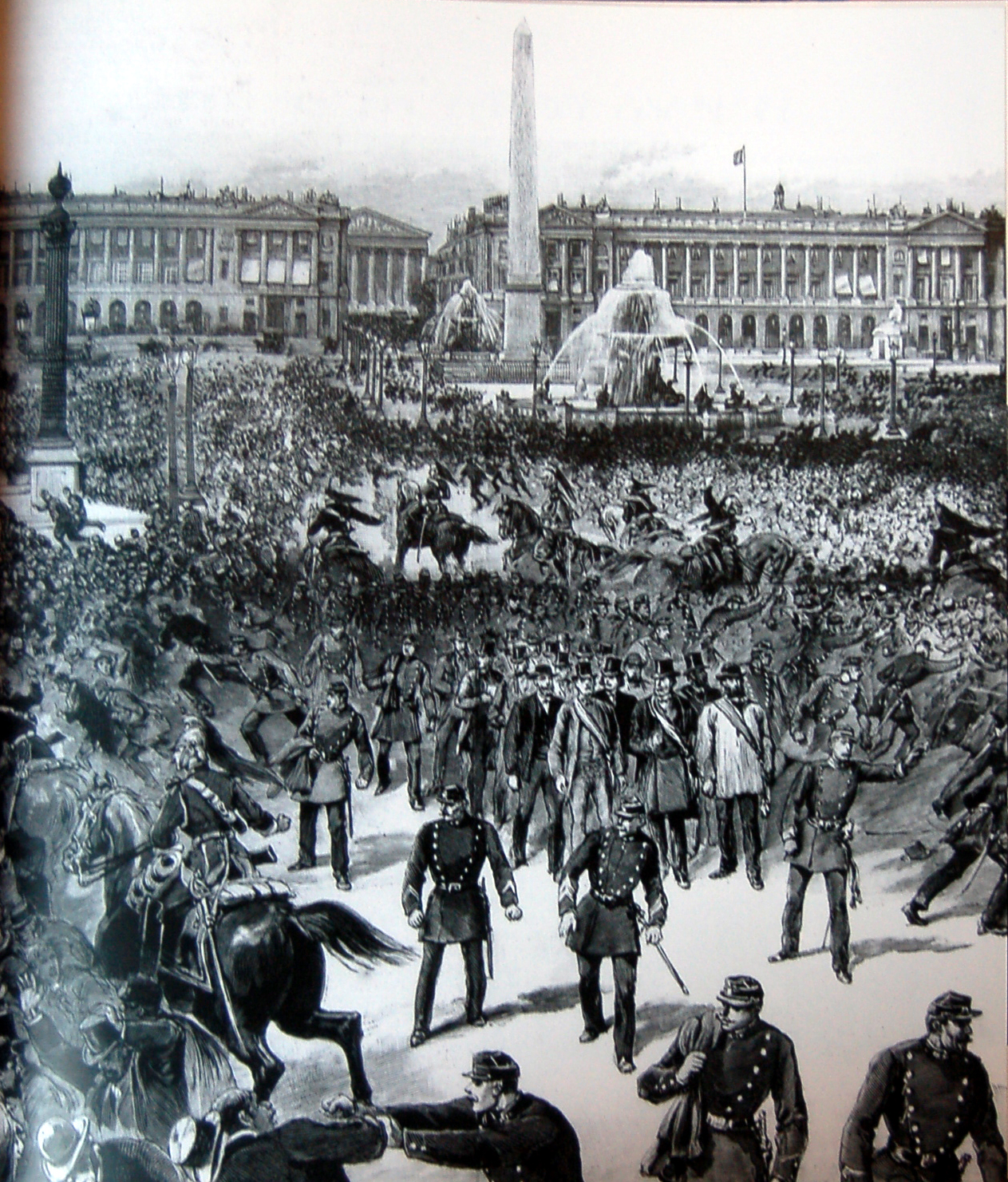
Battles between workers and police on the Place de la Concorde, 1 May 1890.

- 1890
  - 1 May – First celebration of May 1 Labor Day by socialists in France, leading to confrontations with police.
- 1891 – Population: 2,448,000
  - 15 March – One time zone, Paris time, is established for all of France.
  - 20 May – First professional cooking school founded on rue Bonaparte.
- 1892
  - Le Journal newspaper begins publication.
  - First use of reinforced concrete to construct a building in Paris, at 1 rue Danton.
  - 4 October – Launch of the first weather balloon from Parc Monceau.
- 1893
  - 7 April – Café Maxim's opens.
  - 12 April – opening of the Olympia music hall on boulevard des Capucines.
  - 3 July – Disturbances in the Latin Quarter between students and supporters of Senator René Bérenger over supposedly indecent costumes worn at the Bal des Quatre z'arts. One person is killed.
  - December – Opening of the Vélodrome d'hiver cycling stadium on the rue Suffren, in the former Galerie des Machines from the 1889 Exposition.
  - 9 December – the anarchist Auguste Vaillant explodes a bomb in the National Assembly, injuring forty-six persons.
    Poster for the first public screening of a motion picture at the Grand Café, Paris (1895)
- 1894
  - 10 to 30 January – The Photo-club de Paris, founded in 1888 by Constant Puyo, Robert Demachy and Maurice Boucquet, holds the first International Exposition of Photography at the Galeries Georges Petit, 8 rue de Sèze (8th arrondissement), devoted to photography as an art rather than a science. The exhibit launches the movement called Pictorialism.
  - First championship of France football tournament between six Parisian teams.
  - 12 February – The anarchist Émile Henry explodes a bomb in the café of the Gare Saint-Lazare, killing one person and wounding twenty-three.
  - 15 March – The anarchist Amédée Pauwels explodes a bomb in the church of La Madeleine. One person, the bomber, is killed.
  - 22 July – The first automobile race, organized by Le Petit Journal, from Paris to Rouen.
  - Asile George Sand (women's shelter) opens.
- 1895
  - Opening of the first Galeries Lafayette department store
  - 22 March – first projected showing of a motion picture by Louis Lumière at a conference on the future industry of cinematography at 44 rue de Rennes.
  - 10 August – The founding of Gaumont, the first major French film studio.
  - Le Cordon Bleu cooking school opens.
  - Maison de l'Art Nouveau art gallery opens.
  - 12 November – French Automobile Club (Automobile club de France) is founded.
  - 28 December – First public projection of a motion picture by the Lumière Brothers in the basement of the Grand Café, on the corner of Rue Scribe and boulevard des Capucines. Thirty-eight persons attend, including future director Georges Méliès.
- 1896
  - 6 October – Czar Nicholas II of Russia lays the first stone for the pont Alexandre III.
  - 7 December – the Municipal Council approves the project to build the first Paris Metropolitan subway line.
- 1897
  - The Théâtre du Grand-Guignol opens.
  - The Parc des Princes velodrome opens.
  - 4 April – The first women are allowed to attend the École des Beaux-Arts.
  - 4 May – Fire of the Bazar de la Charité, at 17 rue Jean Goujon, over 325 victims, of which 126 lost their life.
  - 13 July – The opening of the Musée de l'Armée (Army Museum) at Les Invalides.
  - 3 September – opening of the first movie theater, in the theatre Robert-Houdon on boulevard des Italiens. The theater is rented for three months by Georges Méliès to show films.
  - 4 December – The first Paris automobile show held as part of the Salon du Cycle at the Palais des Sports on rue de Berri.
- 1898
  - 13 January – Émile Zola publishes his open letter to the president of France on the Dreyfus affair, J'accuse in L'Aurore newspaper.
  - 20 April – The first motorcycle race at Longchamp.
  - 19 September – The work begins on the Paris Metro.
  - 20 October – The first wireless communication made between the Eiffel Tower and the Panthéon by Eugène Ducretet and Ernest Roger.
  - The Hôtel Ritz Paris opens.
  - Le Dôme Café opens.
- 1899
  - Inauguration of the monumental statue Triomphe de la République by Jules Dalou on the place de la Nation.

== 20th century ==
=== 1900–1913 – La Belle Époque ===
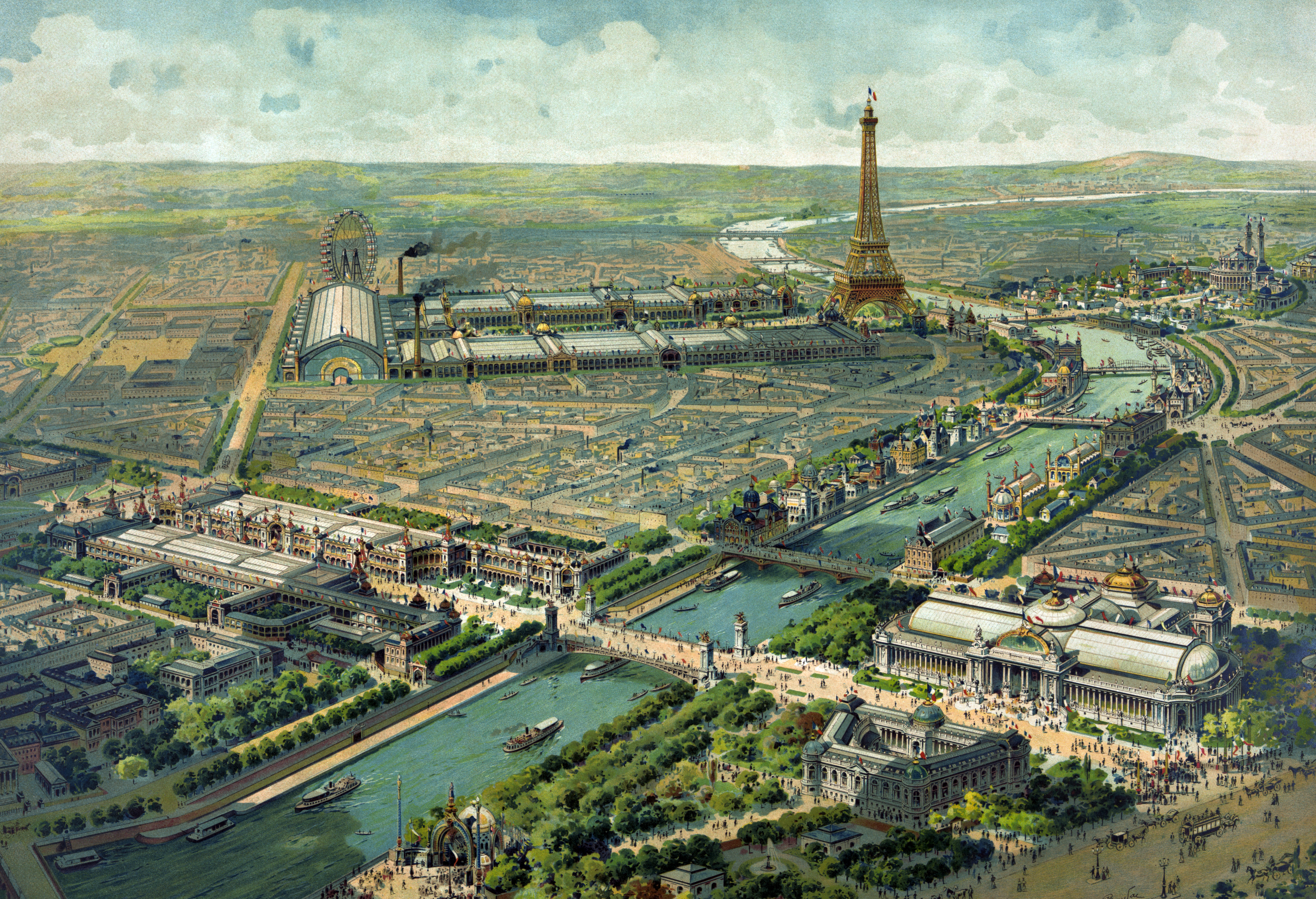
The Exposition Universelle (1900)

- 1900
  - 13 February – Whistles are issued to Paris traffic policemen.
  - 24 February – The first newsreel films, of the Boer War, are shown at the Olympia Theater.
  - 14 April – The opening of the Exposition Universelle (1900), including the Grand Palais, the Petit Palais, and the Pont Alexandre III. Before it closes on 12 November, the Exposition attracts more than fifty million visitors.
  - 13 May – Right wing candidates win the municipal elections, after twenty years of domination by the left.
  - 14 May – The opening of the 1900 Summer Olympics, held for the second time in Paris.
  - 19 July – The opening of the first line of the Paris Métro between Porte de Versailles and Porte Maillot.
  - 15 September – automatic ticket gates for the metro are replaced by ticket agents, because of the high number of people jumping the gates.
  - 4 December – Law passed permitting women to practice law.
- 1901
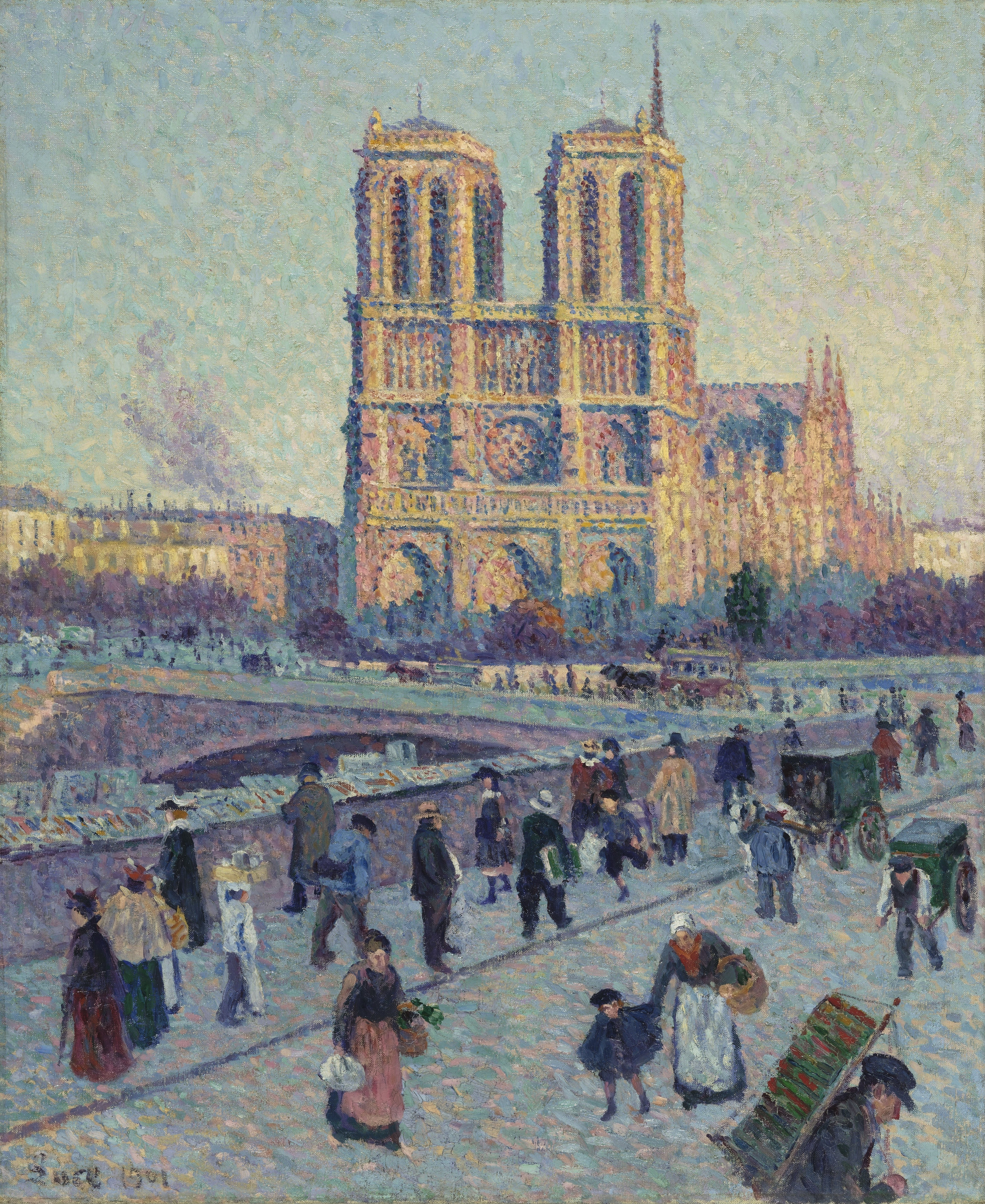
  The Quai Saint-Michel and Notre-Dame, by Maximilien Luce (1901)
  - Population: 2,715,000
  - The Pathé opens film production studio in Vincennes.
  - April 1 – The opening of the new Gare de Lyon train station, including the restaurant Le Train bleu.
  - 1 July – The opening of the first electric train line in Europe between Les Invalides and Versailles.
  - 28 September – First European lawn tennis championship held in Paris.
- 1902
  - 26 January – First Gitanes cigarettes go on sale.
  - 16 October – First use of fingerprints by Paris police to identify a murderer.
  - Premiere of Méliès' film A Trip to the Moon.
  - Premiere of Debussy's opera Pelléas et Mélisande.
- 1903
  - 1 July – Start of the first Tour de France, ending 19 July, with a parade of the winners at the Parc des Princes.
  - 10 August – first serious metro accident at Couronnes station – eighty-four persons killed.
  - 4 September – Opening of the high-fashion house of Paul Poiret.
  - First Vélodrome d'hiver cycling stadium opens in the former Galerie des Machines of the 1900 Paris Exposition.
  - Premiere of Mirbeau's play Business is Business.
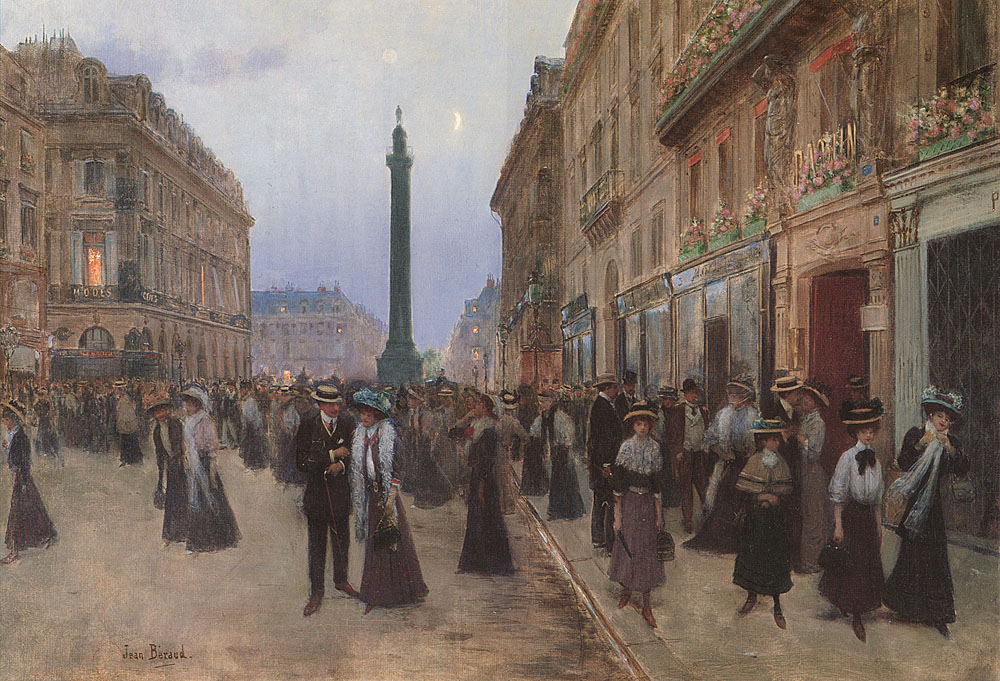
    Rue de la Paix, by Jean Beraud (1907)
- 1904
  - 6 February – Opening of the Alhambra music hall on rue de Malte.
  - 18 April – The socialist (later Communist) newspaper L'Humanité newspaper begins publication.
  - 8 May – Socialists and radicals win the Paris municipal elections.
  - 23 November – Consecration of the first Paris church built of concrete, Saint-Jean-l'Évangéliste de Montmartre.
  - 20 December – first automobile taxis go into service.
- 1905
  - After viewing the boldly colored canvases of Henri Matisse, André Derain, Albert Marquet, Maurice de Vlaminck, Kees van Dongen, Charles Camoin, and Jean Puy at the Salon d'automne of 1905, the critic Louis Vauxcelles disparaged the painters as "fauves" (wild beasts), thus giving their movement the name by which it became known, Fauvism.
  - Gaumont's Cité Elgé studios open at Buttes-Chaumont.
  - First underground public toilets open at place de la Madeleine.
- 1906
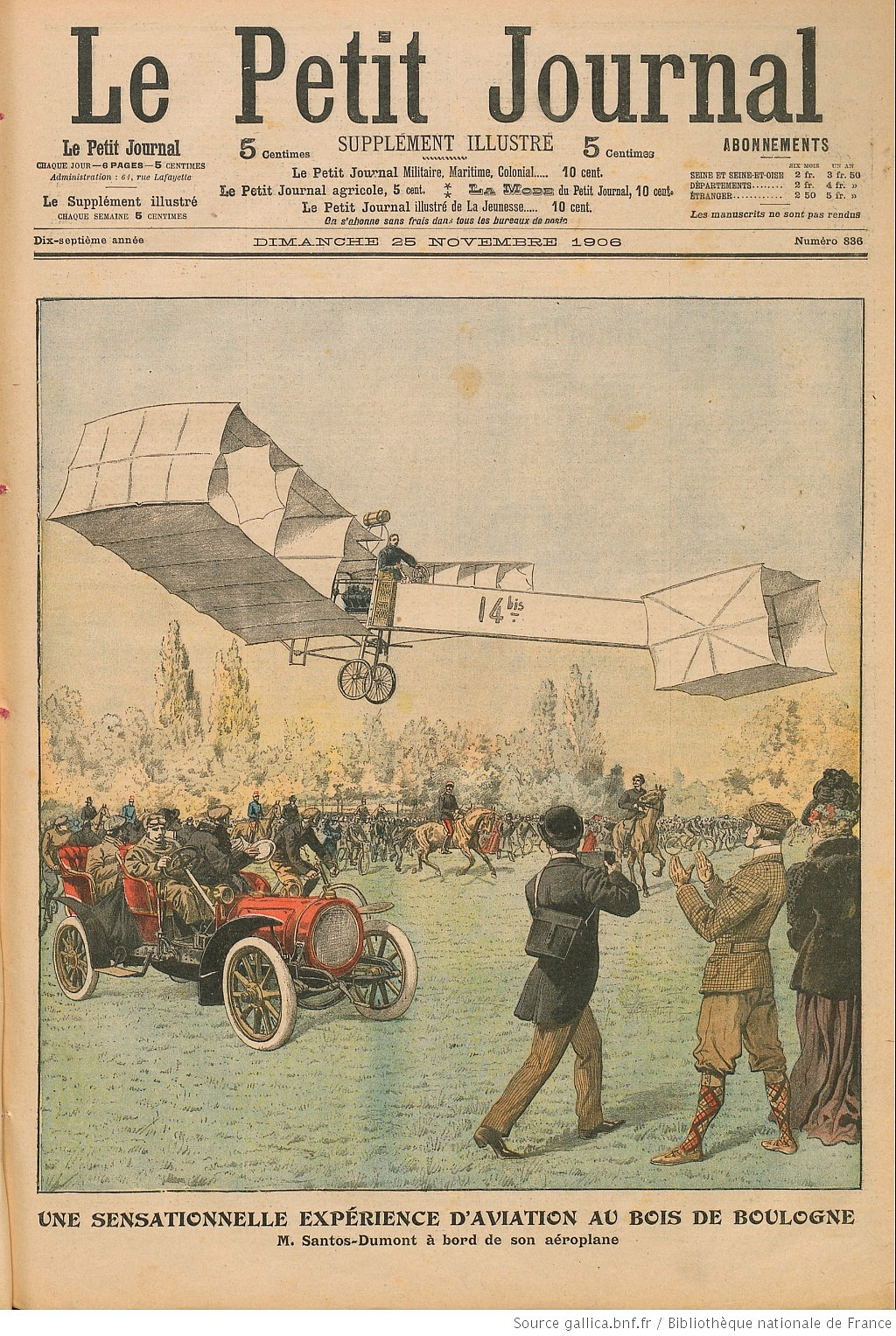
  First Paris flight by Santos Dumont in 1906.
  - Population: 2,722,731.
  - 22 March – First England-France Rugby match played at Parc des Princes.
  - 11 June – first motorized bus line begins service between Montmartre and Saint-Germain-des-Prés. Horse-drawn omnibuses continued to run until January 1913.
  - 23 October – First airplane flight in Paris by Santos Dumont, flying sixty meters at an altitude of three meters at the Parc de Bagatelle.
- 1907
  - 22 February – First woman receives a license to drive a taxi in Paris.
  - 25 March – first traffic roundabout created in Paris at Place de l'Étoile.
  - Summer. Pablo Picasso, living in the Bateau-Lavoir in Montmartre, paints Les Demoiselles d'Avignon, a major turning point in modern art.
  - Kahnweiler art gallery opens.
  - An exhibition at the Galerie Notre-Dame-des-Champs includes Jean Metzinger, Georges Braque, Sonia Delaunay, André Derain, Raoul Dufy, Auguste Herbin, Jules Pascin and Pablo Picasso.
- 1909
  - 1 March – First escalator installed in a Paris metro station.
  - 29 May – opening of Luna Park amusement park at Porte Maillot.
  - 2 June – Paris premiere of the ballet Les Sylphides by Sergei Diaghilev's Ballets Russes at the Théâtre du Châtelet, Paris, with Vaslav Nijinsky and Anna Pavlova in the leading roles.
  - 13 December – Creation of first one-way streets in Paris on rue de Mogador and rue de la Chaussée-d'Antin.
- 1910
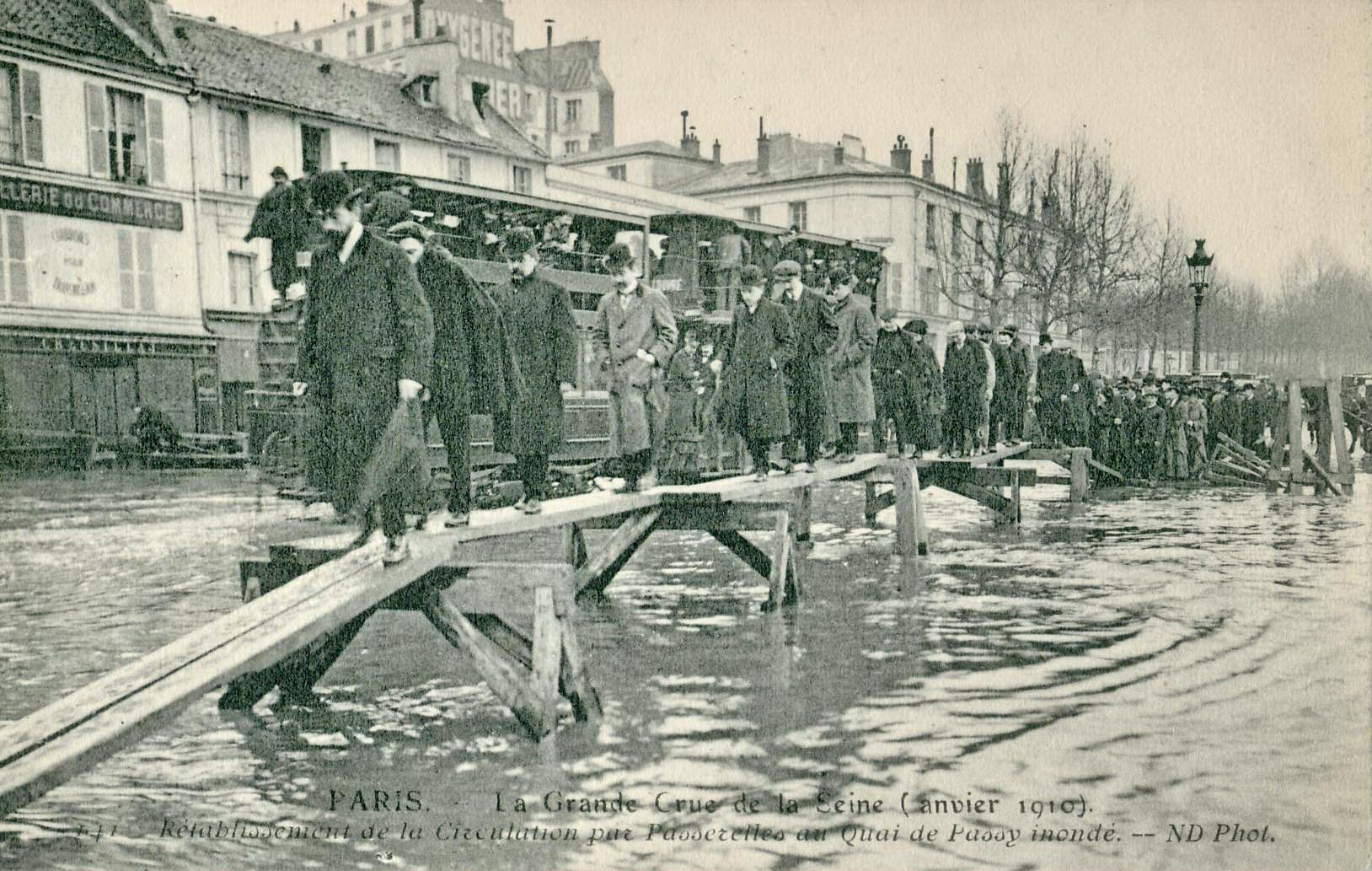
  During the 1910 Great Flood of Paris, at Quai de Passy
  - January 21–28 – Great flood of Paris. The Seine rises 8.5 meters, the highest level since 1658, and overflows its banks. The flood affects one sixth of the buildings in Paris.
  - 13 February – Opening of the Vélodrome d'hiver cycling stadium on rue de Grenelle.
  - 3 December – First use of neon lights on the Grand Palais. The first neon advertising sign appears on Boulevard Montmartre in 1912.
  - Coco Chanel Opens her first boutique, called Chanel Modes, at 21 rue Cambon.
  - First Gauloises cigarettes go on sale.
  - Odéon metro station opens.
  - According to Robert Delaunay, the Salle II of the 1910 Salon des Indépendants was "the first collective manifestation of a new art (un art naissant), known two years later as Cubism.
  - At the Salon d'automne of 1910, held from 1 October to 8 November, Jean Metzinger introduced an extreme form of what would soon be labeled Cubism.
- 1911
  - 24 January – Departure of the first Paris-Monte Carlo automobile race.
  - 22 August – The Mona Lisa is stolen from the Louvre. It was recovered in Florence in December, 1913.
  - Gaumont-Palace cinema opens.
  - Fictional Fantômas crime series begins publication.
  - The 1911 Salon des Indépendants officially introduced "Cubism" to the public as an organized group movement.
- 1912
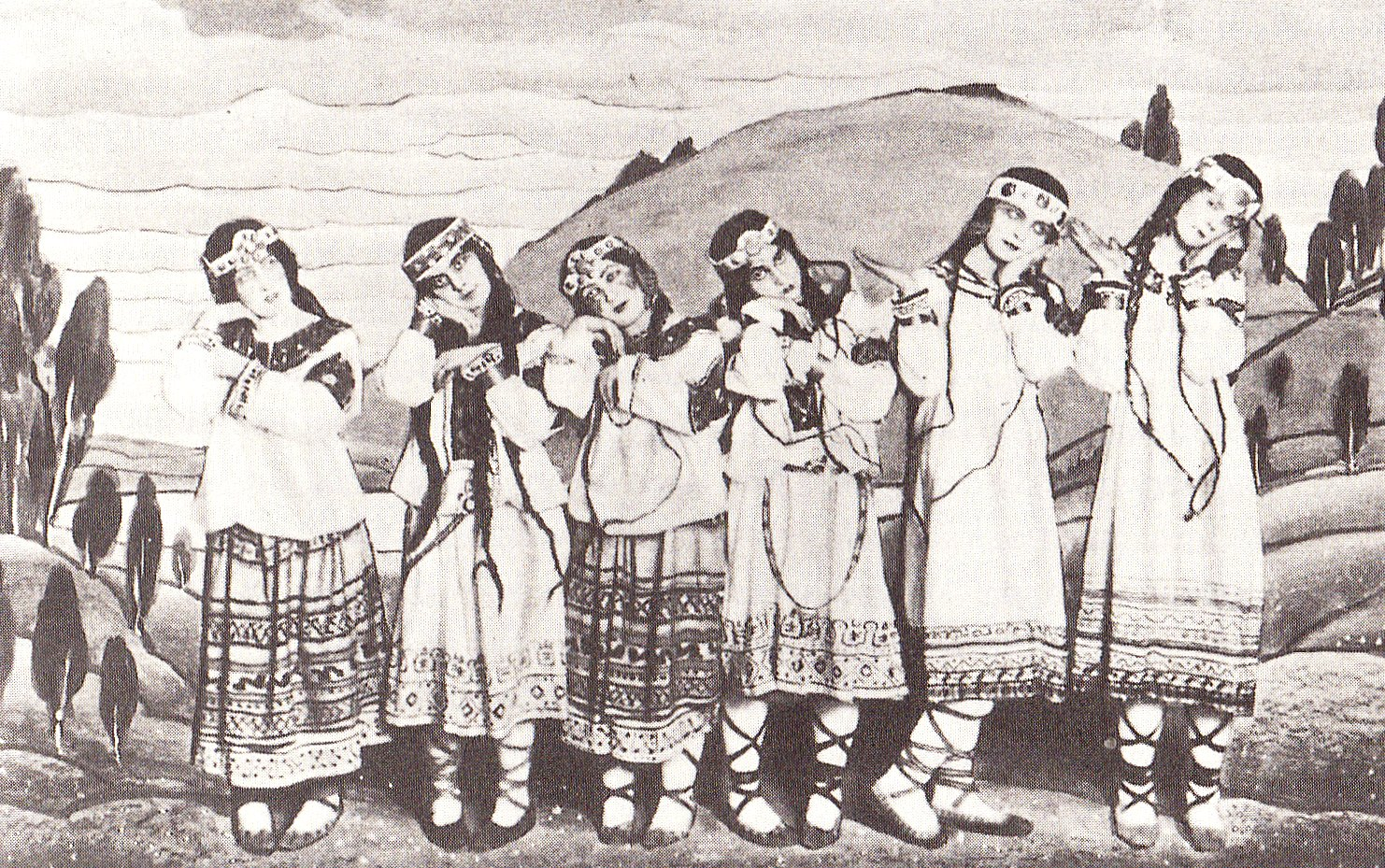
  Dancers from Stravinsky's The Rite of Spring (1913).
  - 15 February – Opening of the Maison de Beauté salon of Helena Rubenstein at 255 rue Saint-Honoré.
  - 4 May – Criminal Brigade of the Sûreté formed to deal with major crimes and criminals.
  - 1 June – First world tennis championship held at the stade de la Faisanderie in Saint-Cloud.
  - 29 May – Premiere of Nijinsky's ballet Afternoon of a Faun.
  - The Cubist contribution to the 1912 Salon d'automne created a controversy in the Municipal Council of Paris, leading to a debate in the Chambre des Députés about the use of public funds to provide the venue for such art. The Cubists were defended by the Socialist deputy, Marcel Sembat.
- 1913
  - 31 March – Opening of the Théâtre des Champs-Élysées.
  - 29 May – Premiere of Stravinsky's The Rite of Spring.
  - 1 October – First collection of trash my motorized trucks instead of handcarts.
  - 24 December – First presidential Christmas tree, placed at Trocadéro, is lit by President Raymond Poincaré.

=== 1914–1918 – First World War ===
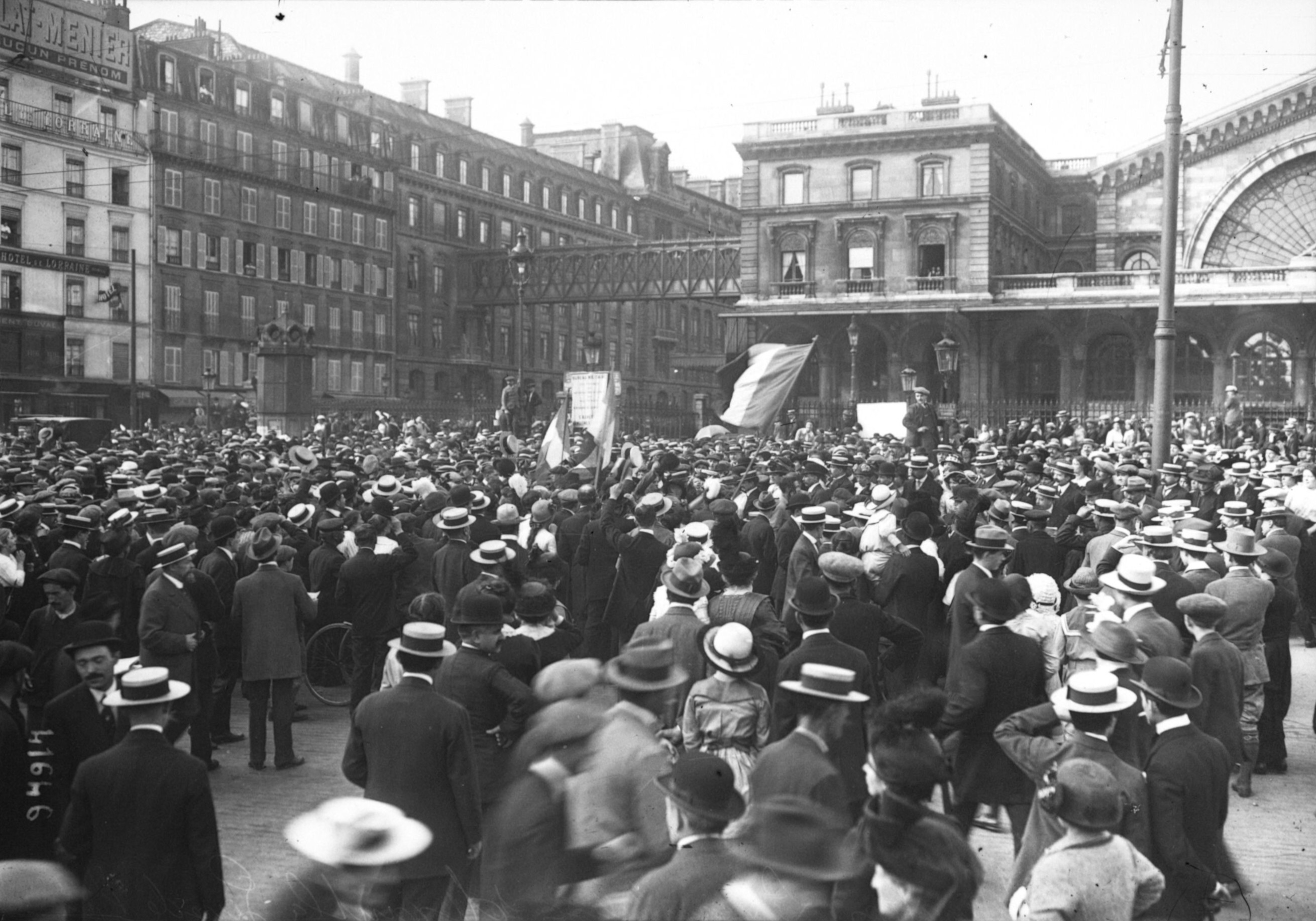
Crowd of reservists being mobilized at the Gare de l'Est (2 August 1914)

- 1914
  - 31 July – Jean Jaurès, leader of the French socialists, assassinated by mentally disturbed man in the Café du Croissant on rue du Croissant in Montmartre.
  - 1 August – Mobilization of army reservists.
  - 3 August – France declares war on Germany. The beginning of the First World War.
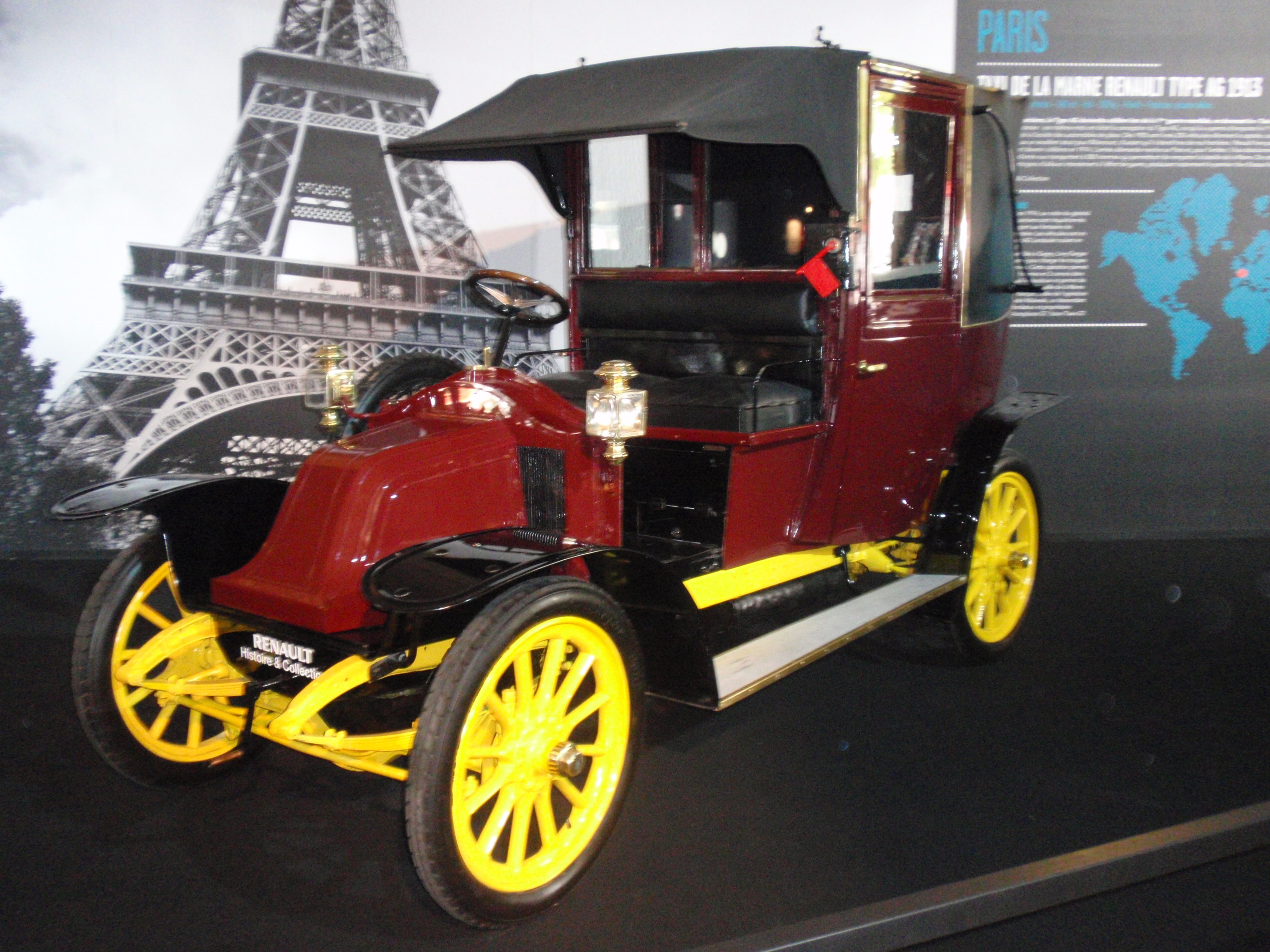
    Paris taxis carried 6000 soldiers to the front lines during the First Battle of the Marne (8 September 1914).
  - 29 August – As German army approaches, French government and National Assembly depart Paris for Bordeaux.
  - September 6–9 – Army requisitions 600–1000 Paris taxis to transport six thousand soldiers fifty kilometers to the front lines in the First Battle of the Marne.
  - December 9 – Government and National Assembly return to Paris.
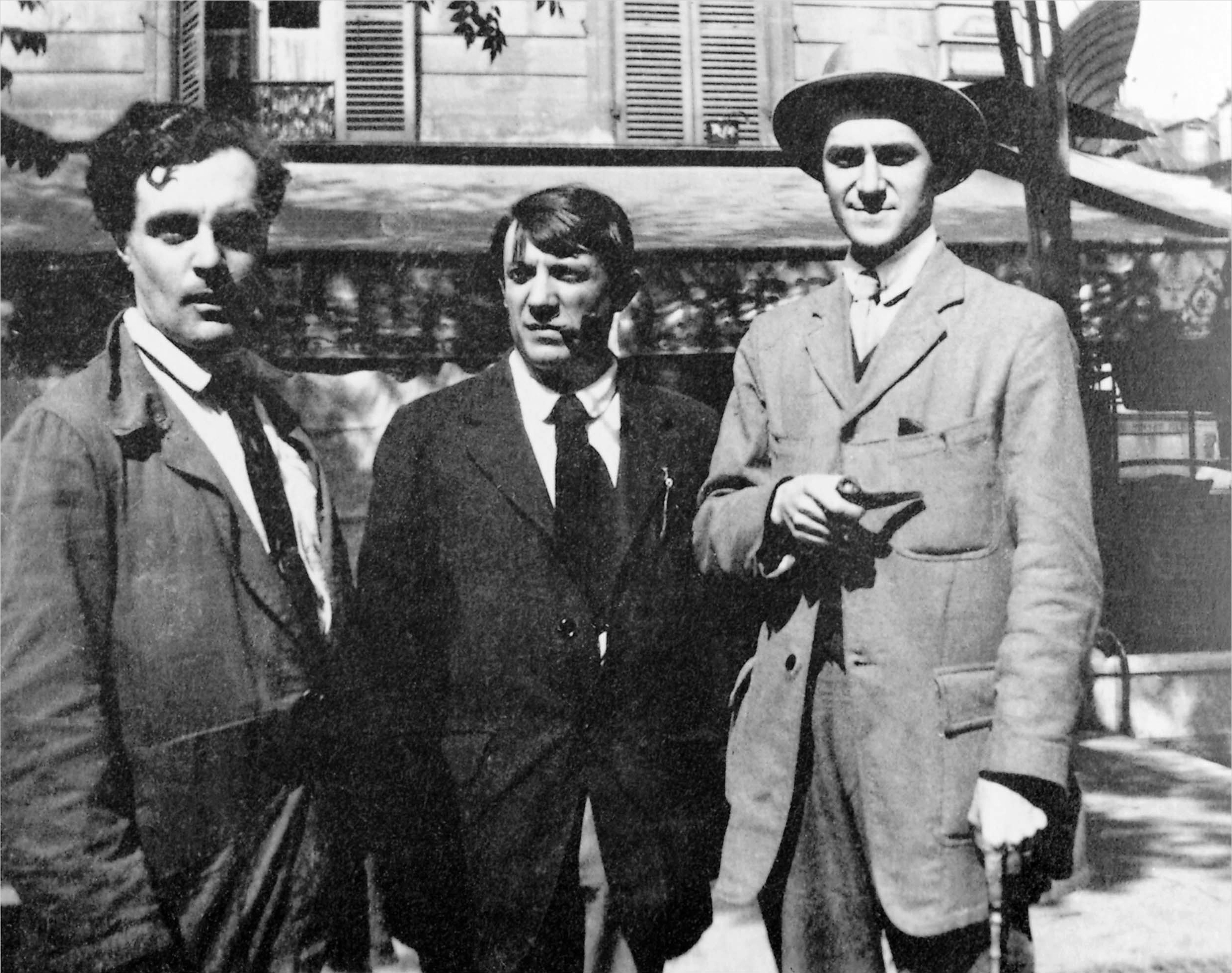
    During the First World War, Montparnasse became the new gathering place for Paris artists and writers. Amedeo Modigliani, Pablo Picasso and André Salmon in front of the café Le Dôme, photographed by Jean Cocteau (1916).
  - El Ajedrecista automaton introduced at University of Paris.
- 1915
  - 10 September – the Satirical magazine Canard enchaîné begins publication.
  - 30 October – official prices of food are posted on doorways of public schools, to deter speculation.
- 1916
  - 20 January – Frozen meat goes on sale in two Paris butcher shops.
  - 29 January – First bombing of Paris by a German Zeppelin. Twenty-six persons are killed and thirty two wounded at Belleville.
  - 27 August – 1,700 Chinese workers arrive at the Gare de Lyon to work in Paris armaments factories, replacing men mobilized into the army. One of the Chinese workers was Zhou Enlai, future Communist leader in China, who worked in the Renault factory at Boulogne-sur-Seine, town renamed Boulogne-Billancourt in 1924.
  - 15 December – The first woman conductor is hired for the Paris tramways.
  - The Renault factory at Boulogne-sur-Seine begins manufacturing the first French tanks.
- 1917
  - 9 February – Shortage of coal and grain. Bakers are permitted to sell only one kind of bread, sold the day after it is baked.
  - 15 May – Wave of strikes in Paris workshops and factories, demanding a five-day week and an extra franc a day to compensate for higher prices. Most demands are granted.
  - 1 September – Rationing of coal begins.
  - 25 November – Seats are reserved on Paris public transportation for the blind and those wounded in the war.
  - 15 October – Execution by firing squad of the Dutch Mata Hari, a spy for the Germans, in the moat of the Château de Vincennes.
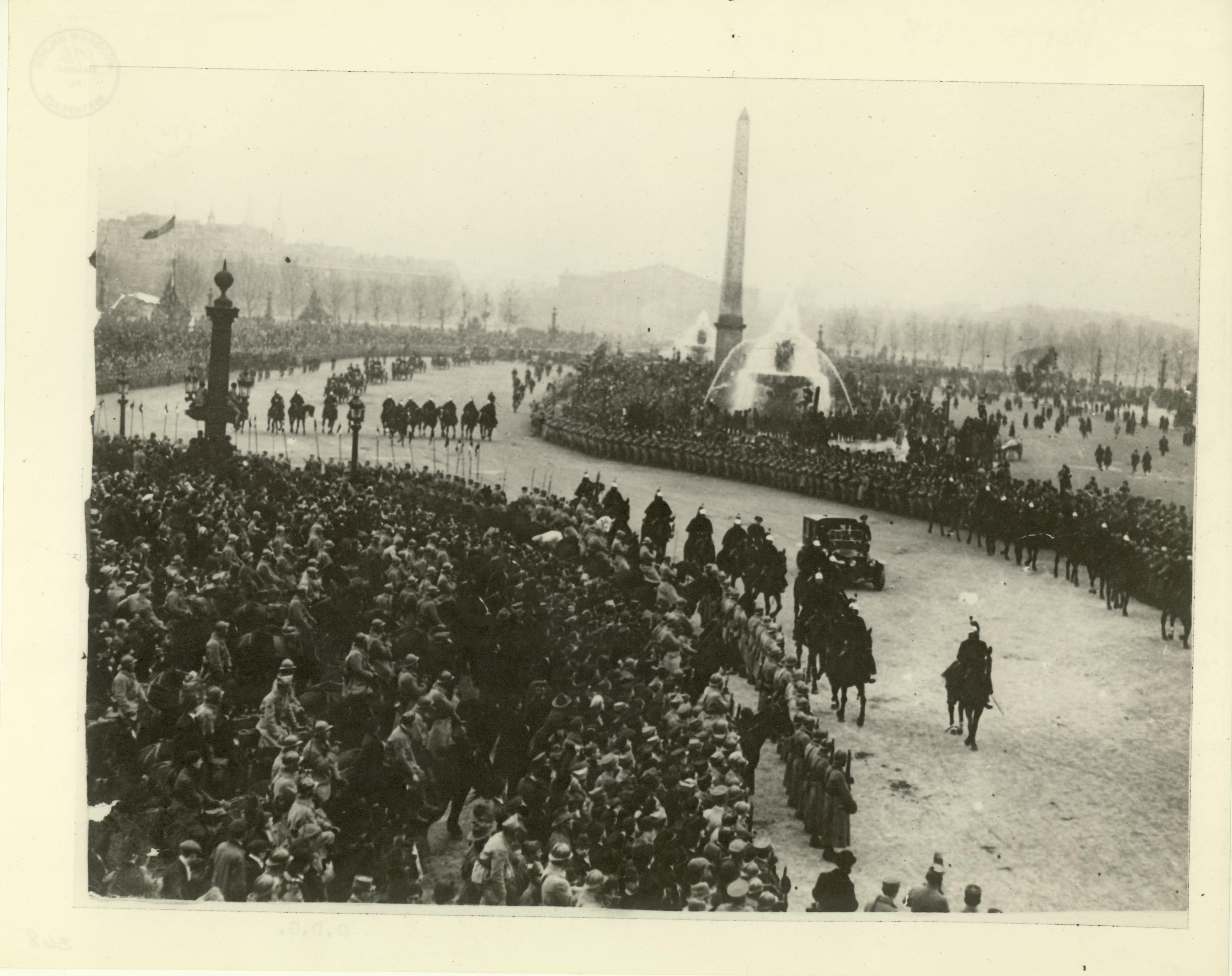
    Victory parade on Place de la Concorde, (11 November 1918)
- 1918
  - 29 January – Rationing of bread is imposed; a card allows three hundred grams per day per person.
  - 30 January – Night bombing raid by twenty-eight German aircraft kills sixty-five persons and injures two hundred. Further raids took place on 8 and 11 March.
  - 11 March – German bombing raid causes a panic in the Bolivar metro station, killing seventy-one persons.
  - 21 March – German long-range artillery fires eighteen shells into Paris, killing fifteen and wounding sixty-nine. The shelling continued until 16 September.
  - 29 March – a German shell hits the Saint-Gervais church during mass, killing eighty-two persons and injuring sixty-nine.
  - October – Epidemic of Spanish influenza, which began at the start of the year, kills 1,778 persons in one week.
  - 11 November – Signing of armistice ends the war. Victory celebrations on the Champs-Élysées.
  - 16 December – U.S. President Wilson addresses crowd at the Hôtel-de-Ville.

=== 1919–1929 – Les Années Folles ===
- 1919
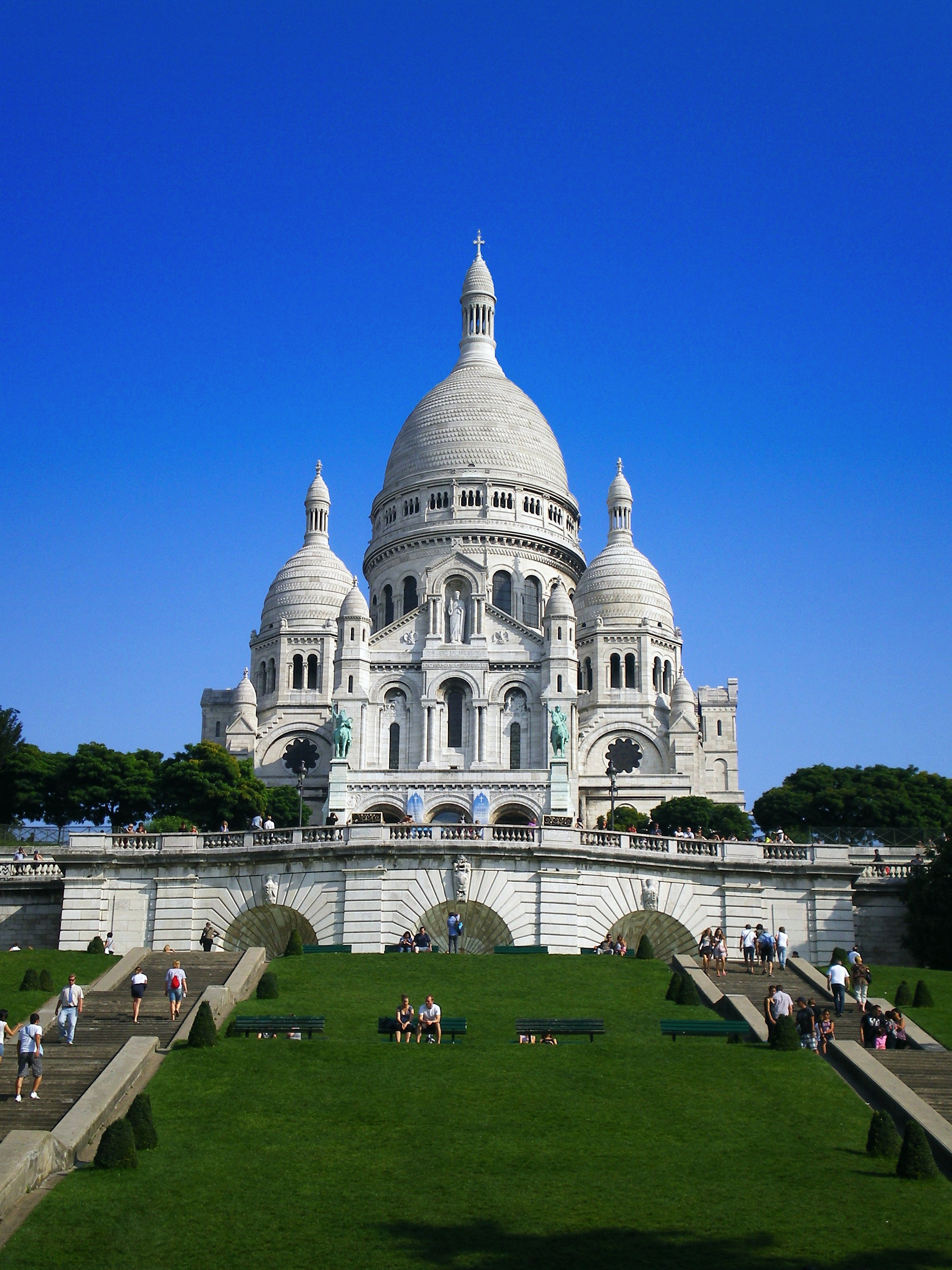
  The Basilica of Sacré-Cœur on Montmartre was begun in 1873 but not finished until 1919.
  - 8 February – Beginning of the world's first commercial air service between Paris and London.
  - March – Lignes Farman airline begins operating its Brussels-Paris route.
  - 19 April – Law passed approving the demolition of the ring of fortifications built around Paris in 1840–1841.
  - 1 June – End of bread rationing.
  - 21 July – General strike by Paris workers.
  - August – Aircraft Transport and Travel airline begins operating its daily London-Paris route.
  - 16 October – Consecration of the Basilica of Sacré-Cœur.
  - Musée Rodin opens.
  - The first Shakespeare and Company, owned by Sylvia Beach, an American expatriate, opened at 8 rue Dupuytren. It moved to a larger location at 12 rue de l'Odéon in the 6th arrondissement in 1922 but closed in 1940 and never re-opened.
- 1920
  - 19 August – National Assembly votes a credit of 500,000 francs to build a mosque near the Jardin des Plantes.
  - The Paris edition of the American fashion magazine Vogue begins publication.
  - Théâtre National Populaire opens at the Palais de Chaillot.
  - American Library in Paris founded.
- 1921
  - Population: 2,906,472 (historic high)
  - 28 January – Remains of an unknown French soldier killed in the war placed in a tomb beneath the Arc de Triomphe.
  - 26 November – first concert broadcast by radio from the transmitter on the Eiffel Tower.
  - November – Ernest Hemingway arrives in Paris as a correspondent for the Toronto Star with his wife Hadley and settles at 74 rue du Cardinal-Lemoine on the Left Bank. He remains in Paris at different addresses and with a different wife until 1928.
- 1922
  - 19 March – First stone placed for the Grand Mosque of Paris.
  - April – installation of the first three-colored stoplights in Paris at the corner of rue de Rivoli and boulevard de Sébastopol.
  - International Union of Railways headquartered in Paris.
- 1923
  - 27 February – Paris-Soir evening newspaper begins publication.
  - 24 May – The old morgue of Paris is replaced by the opening of the Institut médico-légal at 2 place Mazas.
  - 29 May – Municipal council approves the construction of low-cost housing projects. 300 million francs are voted for this purpose on 27 August 1924.
- 1924
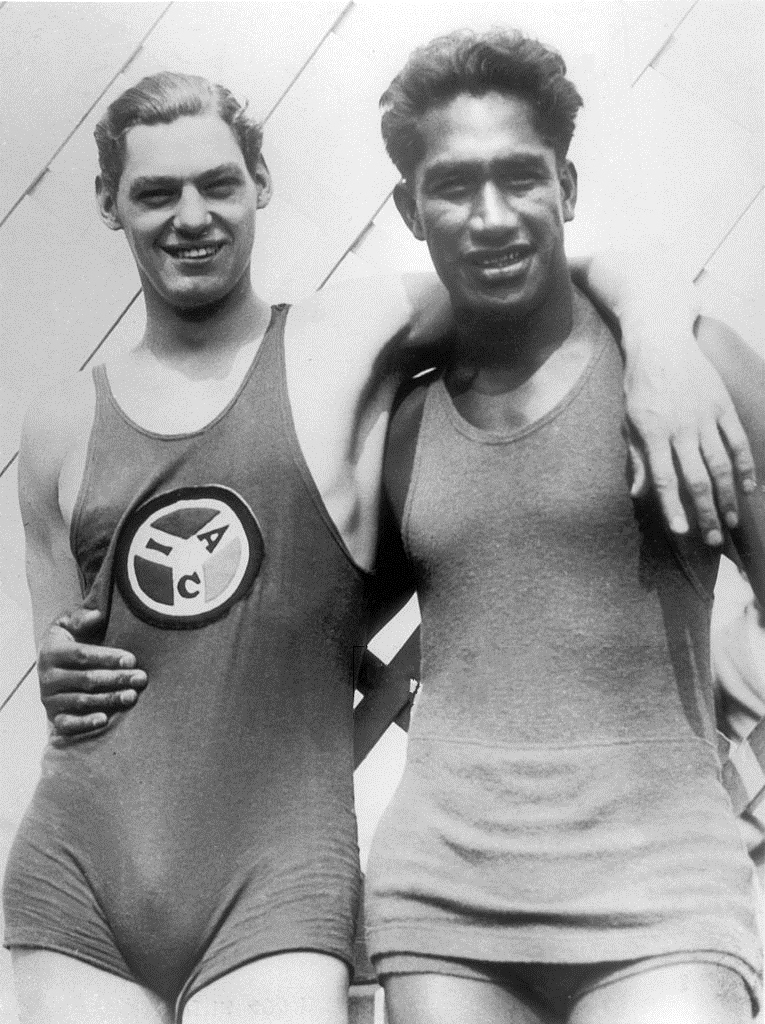
  Medal winners at the 1924 Paris Olympics included the swimmers Johnny Weissmuller (the future Tarzan star) and the Hawaiian Duke Kahanamoku. (1924)
  - 22 January – A bronze star is placed on the parvis of the Cathedral of Notre-Dame. Henceforth, distances on French highways are measured from this point.
  - 5 July – opening of 1924 Summer Olympics at the stadium of Colombes. Among the medal winners were the Americans Johnny Weissmuller (three gold medals in swimming) and Duke Kahanamoku (silver in swimming). These Olympics are depicted in the film Chariots of Fire.
- 1925
  - 23 April – Street battles between the Communists and a nationalist group, the Jeunesses Patriotes, on rue Damrémont. Four persons are killed, forty injured.
  - 9 July – Opening of the Cité Internationale Universitaire de Paris, a private park and residences for foreign students.
  - 2 October – Josephine Baker stars in La Revue nègre at the Théâtre des Champs-Élysées.
  - 3 October – First radio news broadcast from the transmitter on the Eiffel Tower.
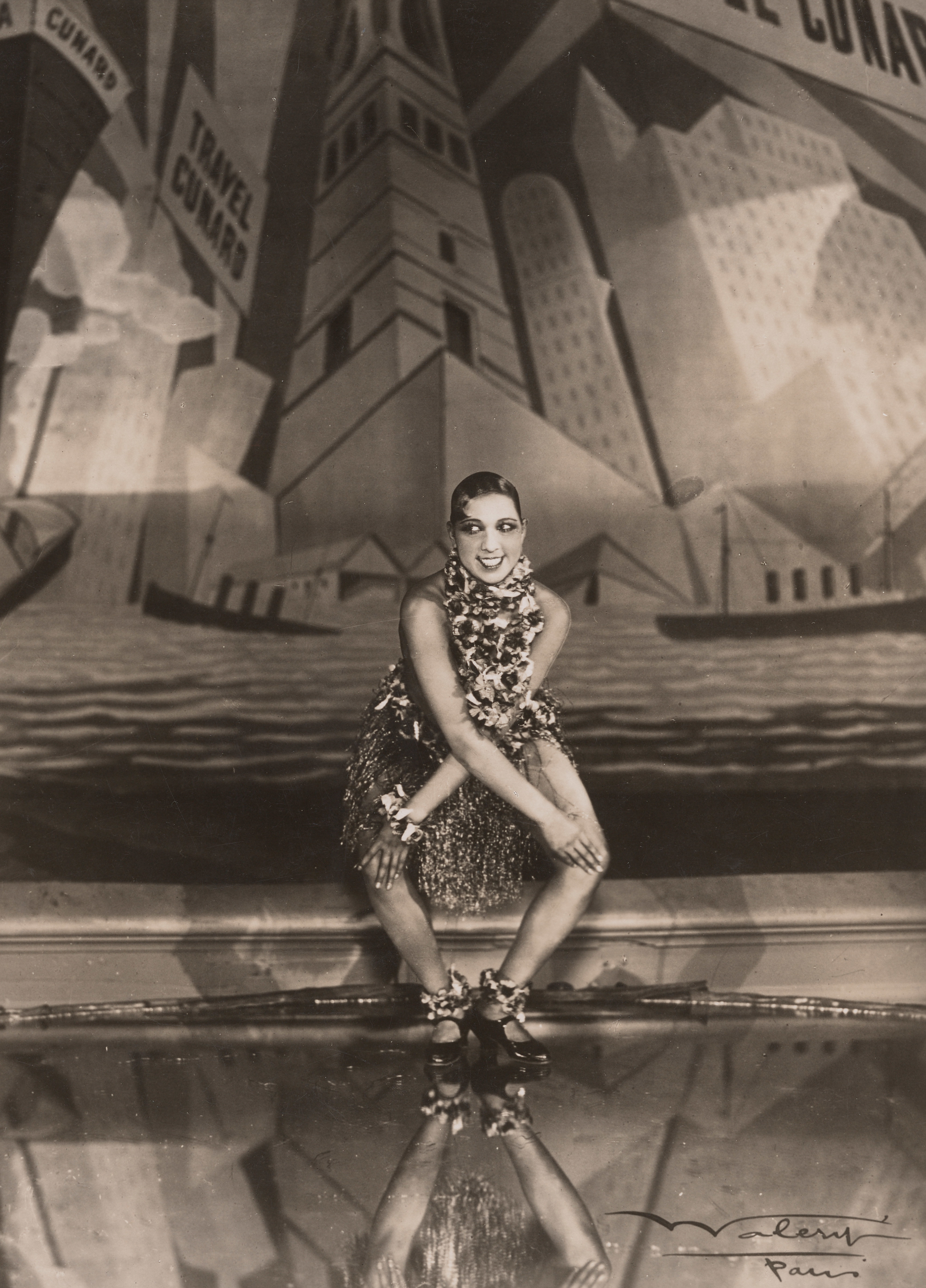
    Singer-dancer Josephine Baker performing in Paris (1926)
- 1926
  - 15 July – Grand Mosque of Paris opens.
  - 18 October – Louis Lumière demonstrates a talking motion picture at the French Academy of Sciences.
- 1927
  - 15 January – Boulevard Haussmann, between rue Drouot and rue Taibout, the last unfinished project of Haussmann's renovation of Paris, is inaugurated.
  - 21 May – Charles Lindbergh lands at Le Bourget airport, completing the first solo transatlantic flight.
  - The Paramount Opéra cinema opens.
  - 27 December – La Coupole opens, competing with Le Dôme Café, the other prominent literary café in the Montparnasse neighborhood.
- 1928
  - 29 July – Opening of the Stade Roland-Garros, built for the matches of the Davis Cup.
  - George Gershwin composes An American in Paris while staying at the Hôtel Majestic.
- 1929
  - 20 June – Fifteen-hundred seat Théâtre Pigalle opens, designed to be the most modern theater in the world. It presented plays staged by Sacha Guitry, Max Reinhardt and other leading directors, before closing in 1948 and being replaced by a parking garage in 1958.
  - 5 October – Communists attack a rally of young socialists at the Gymnase Japy; more than two hundred persons injured.

=== 1930–1939 ===
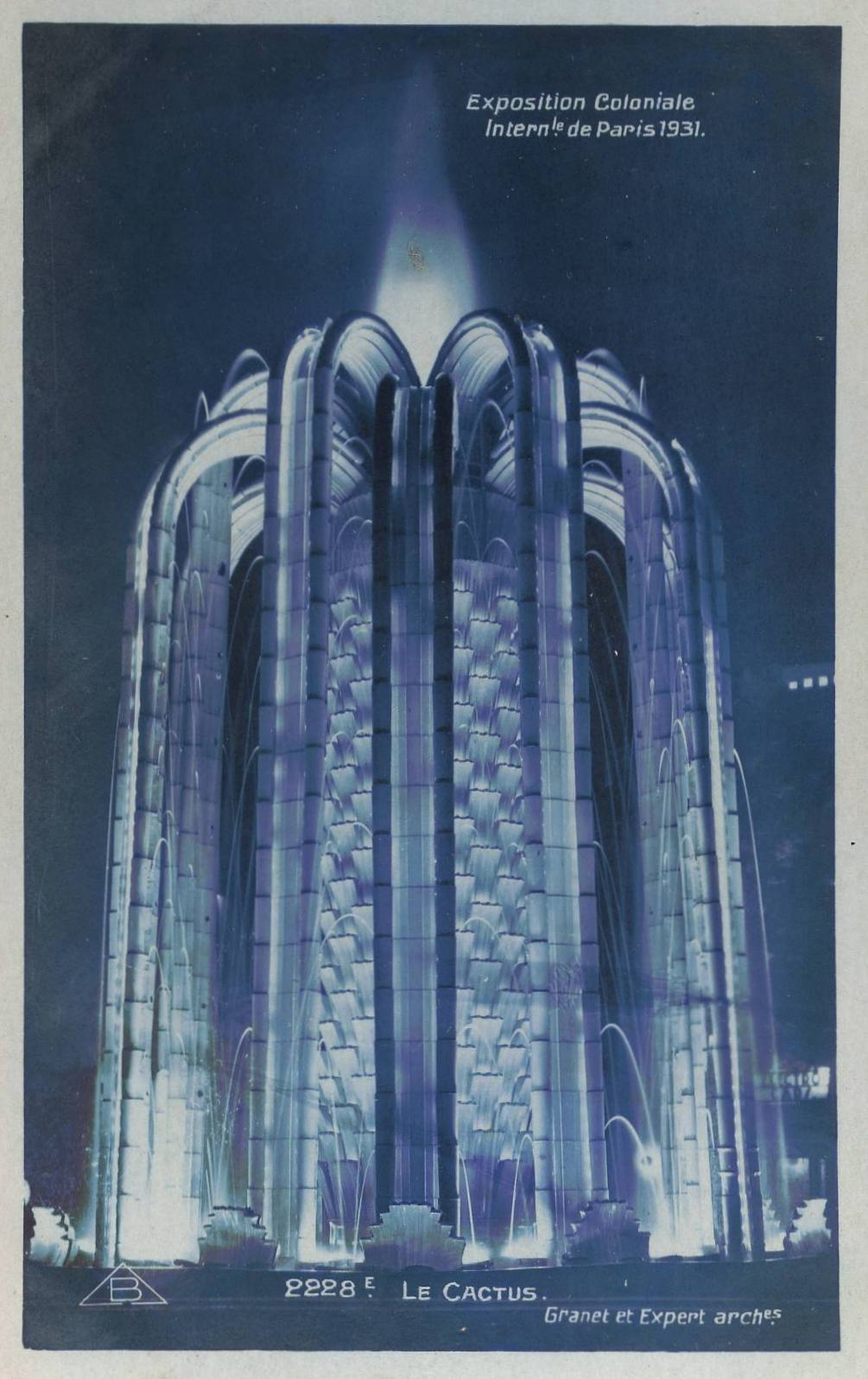
The Cactus Fountain from the Paris Colonial Exposition of 1931.

- 1930
  - 5 April – Opening of the first municipal kindergarten in Paris at Place du Cardinal-Amette.
- 1931
  - Population:2,891,020
  - 14 April – First broadcast of a television signal by René Barthélemy at the École Supérieure d'électricité (Supélec) de Malakoff.
  - 6 May – Paris Colonial Exposition, celebrating the products and cultures of France's overseas colonies, opens in the Bois de Vincennes. Before it closes on 15 November, it attracts thirty-three million visitors.
  - 10 June – First publication of detective novels featuring Commissaire Maigret by Georges Simenon.
  - Corbusier designs the Pavillon Suisse, one of his rare buildings in Paris, for the Cité Universitaire.
- 1932
  - 6 May – Assassination of Paul Doumer, President of the French Republic, on rue Berryer, by a white Russian émigré, Paul Gorguloff. President Doumer died the following day, on 7 May.
  - The Grand Rex cinema opens.
- 1933
  - 30 August – Air France founded.
  - 7 November – First drawing of the National Lottery.
- 1934
  - 3 January – First metro line to the suburbs, to Pont de Sèvres, opens.
  - 12 January – National Assembly debates the Stavisky Affair, a case of high-level political corruption. Violent anti-government street demonstrations break out.
  - 6 February – Riots outside the National Assembly protesting corruption of parliament members. Eleven persons are killed and more than three hundred injured. (See also 6 February 1934 riots)
  - 2 June – Opening of the Paris Zoo in the Bois de Vincennes.
- 1935
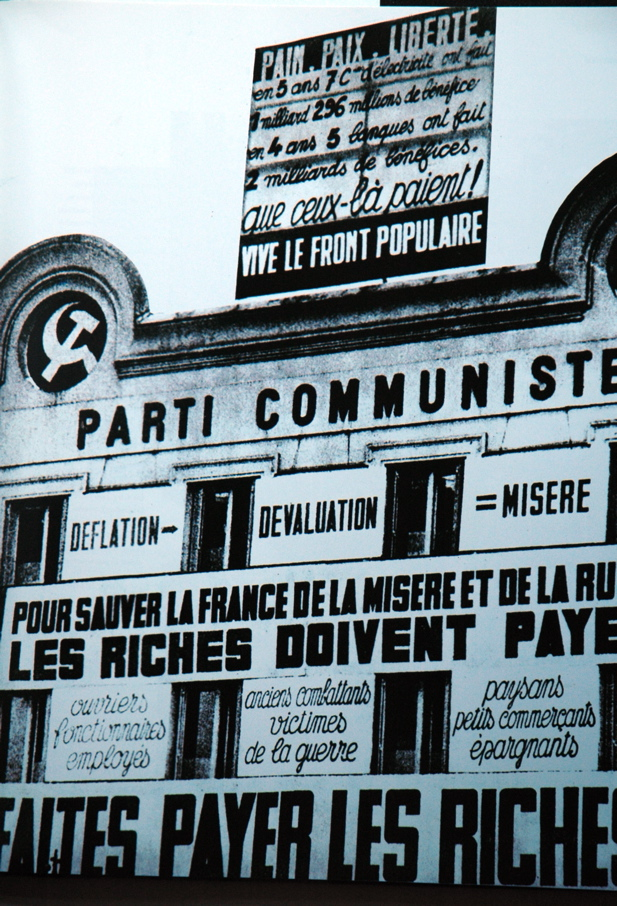
  Popular Front banners for the 1936 elections. The lowest sign says: "Make the rich pay."
  - 26 April – First official television broadcast from the Ministry of the post, telegraph and telephone (PTT) on rue de Grenelle.
  - 5 July – First stone placed for the Musée national d'art moderne (Museum of Modern Art), in the western wing of the Palais de Tokyo, on the avenue de Tokio (renamed avenue de New York in 1945). (The Musée national d'art moderne is now in the Centre Georges Pompidou.)
  - 14 July – The Communists and socialists hold a joint demonstration on Bastille Day, the first demonstration of the new Front populaire, or Popular Front of the left.
- 1936 – Population: 2,829,753
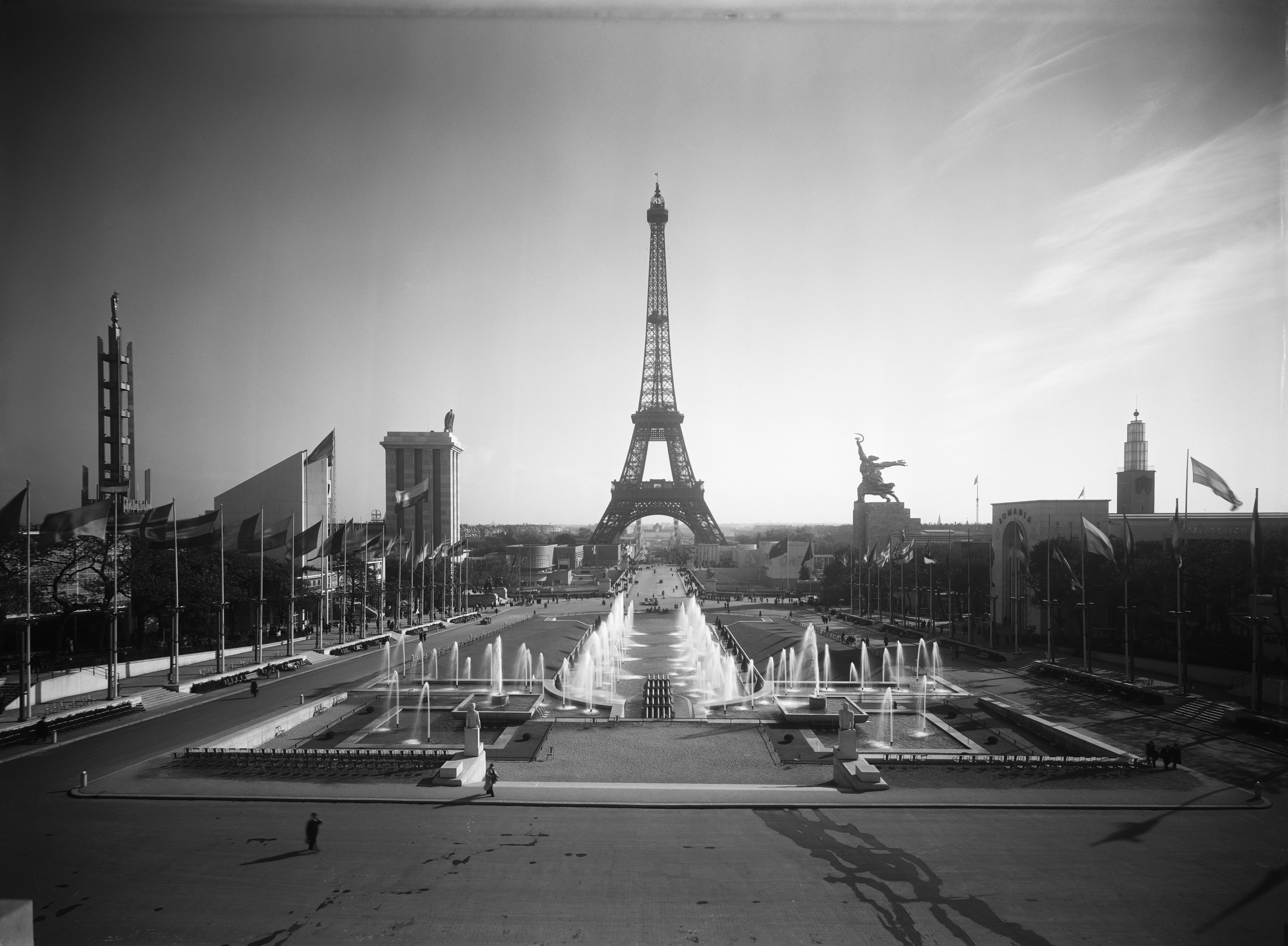
  The pavilions of Soviet Russia (right) and Nazi Germany (left) faced each other at the 1937 Paris Exposition.
  - 3 May – The Front populaire wins the parliamentary elections.
  - 26 May – Strikes in many Paris industries and businesses settled by a salary agreement made with the new government on 7 June.
- 1937
  - 1 May – May Day is celebrated as an official holiday for the first time.
  - 24 May – Opening of the Paris International Exposition of 1937 at the Trocadéro. The pavilions of Nazi Germany and Soviet Russia face each other across the main promenade.
  - 27 August – Opening of the Musée des Monuments français (Museum of French Monuments) in the Palais Chaillot, at Trocadéro.
- 1938
  - 30 September – Prime Minister Édouard Daladier receives a triumphant welcome on his return from the Munich Conference, which gave Czechoslovakia to Nazi Germany.
- 1939
  - 10 March – First gas masks distributed to Paris population.
  - 19 March – Bomb shelters designated throughout Paris.
  - 25 August – The Communist newspaper L'Humanité is closed by the French government for praising the Hitler-Stalin pact as a "new and appreciable contribution to peace, constantly threatened by the warmongering fascists."
  - 31 August – Children are evacuated from Paris.
  - September 1 – Government orders mobilization and a state of siege.
  - 3 September – Declaration of war on Germany.

=== 1939–1945 – The Second World War ===
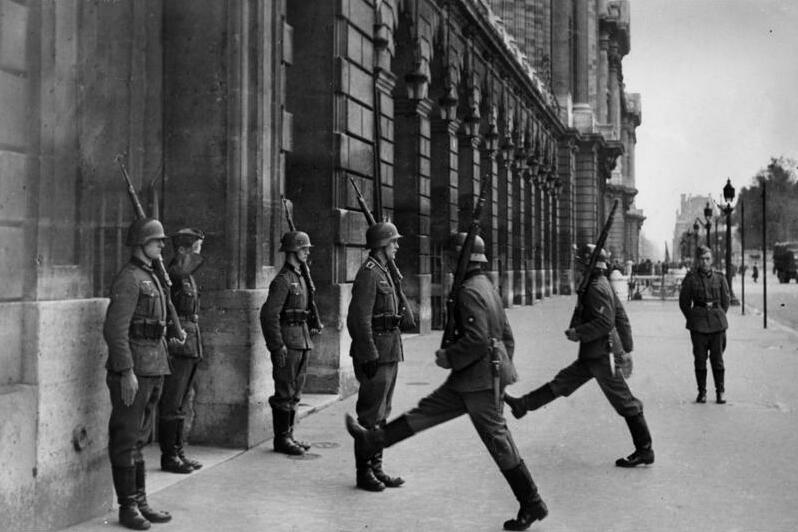
German soldiers change guard on rue de Rivoli (October, 1940)

- 1940
  - 29 February – Food rationing begins in city.
  - 3 June – Germans bomb city for first time. 254 persons are killed, 652 injured.
  - 10 June – French government leaves Paris for Tours, then Bordeaux. Paris is declared an open city.
  - 14 June – German troops enter Paris.
  - 23 June – Hitler comes to Paris for one day. He makes a brief visit to the terrace of the Palais de Chaillot to see the Eiffel Tower.
  - 18 October – German occupation authorities announced that Jews will have a special status.
  - 11 November – First anti-occupation demonstration by students at the Arc de Triomphe.
  - 26 December – Germans suspend the powers of the Municipal Council.
- 1941
  - 14 May – Five thousand non-French Jews, mostly refugees, arrested.
  - 22 June – Germany invades the Soviet Union. The French Communist Party actively joins the Resistance.
  - 1 July – Rationing of textiles begins.
  - 20 July – Opening of the transit Drancy internment camp to hold Jews before deportation.
  - 21 August – A German officer is killed at the Barbès-Rochechouart metro station by a member of the Communist Party, Pierre Georges, later known as Colonel Fabien. The Germans respond by taking civilian hostages and threatening to execute them if more assassinations take place.
  - 29 August – First execution at Fort Mont-Valérien of the members of the resistance, including the French naval officer Honoré d'Estienne d'Orves.
  - 2 September – Paris magistrates are required to take an oath of loyalty to Marshal Pétain. Only one, Paul Didier, refuses.
  - 16 September – Execution by the Germans of the first ten hostages.
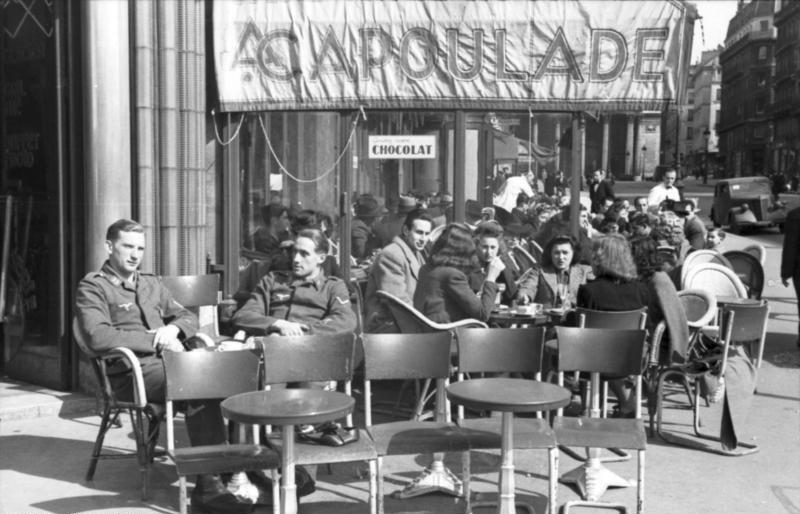
    German soldiers at the café Capoulade on Boulevard Saint-Michel, March 1943
- 1942
  - 10 May – Anti-German demonstration at the Lycée Buffon. Five students are arrested later on and executed several months later.
  - 7 April – All Parisians over sixteen years are required to carry an identity card.
  - 29 April – All Jews in the occupied zone are required to wear a yellow star of David.
  - 16–17 July – 13,000 Parisian Jews arrested and confined at the Vélodrome d'hiver, before being sent to Auschwitz.
- 1943
  - 8 February – Execution by firing squad of the five Lycée Buffon students.
  - 15 February – Germans require Frenchmen between ages of twenty and twenty-three to work for two years in war industries in France and Germany.
  - 27 May – First meeting of the National Council of the Resistance at rue du Four, led by Jean Moulin. It includes both the Communists and the followers of Charles de Gaulle in London.
  - 3 September – First Allied bombing of factories and railroad yards in Paris; four hundred five persons killed.
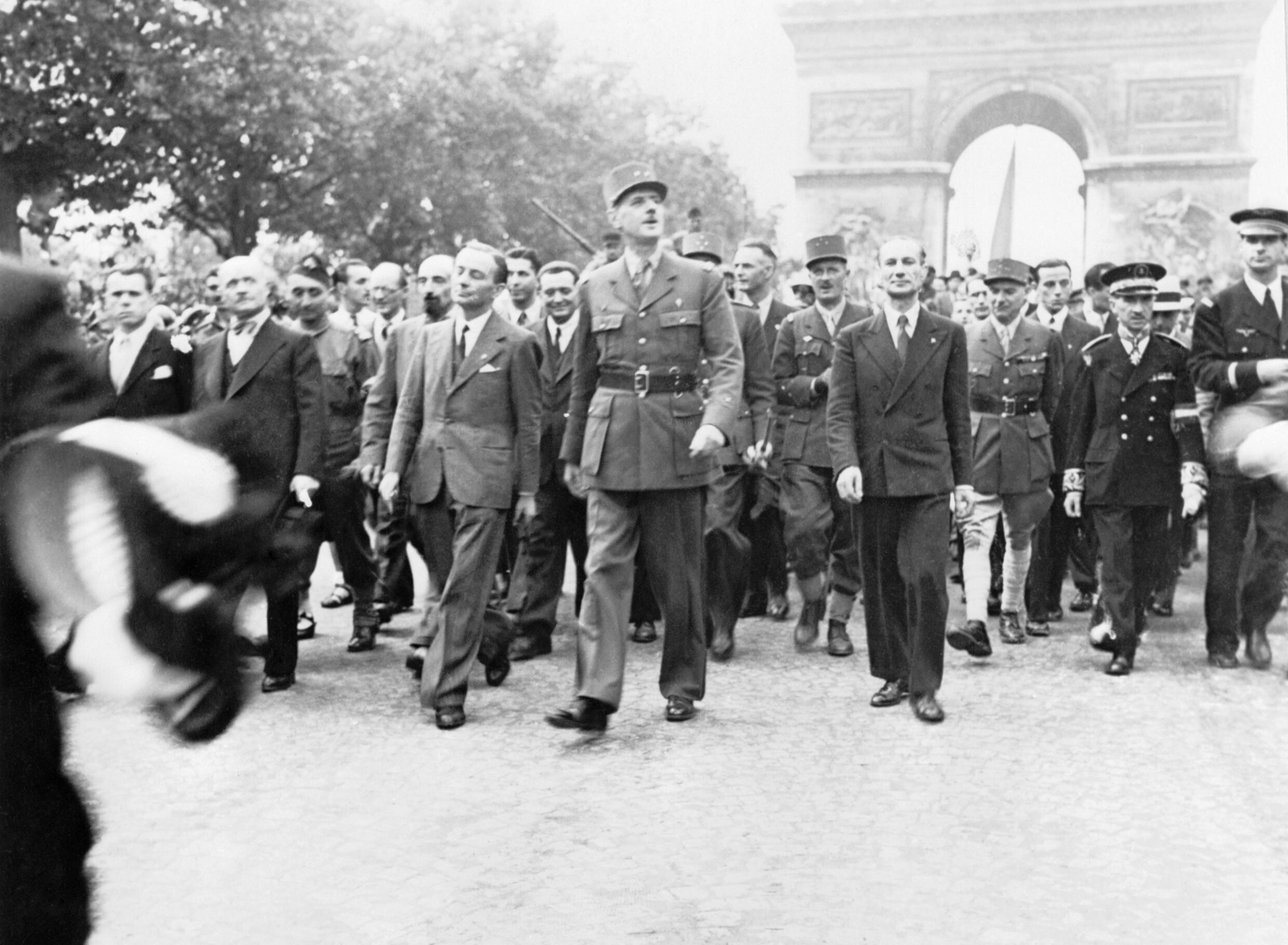
    General de Gaulle celebrates the liberation of Paris (26 August 1944).
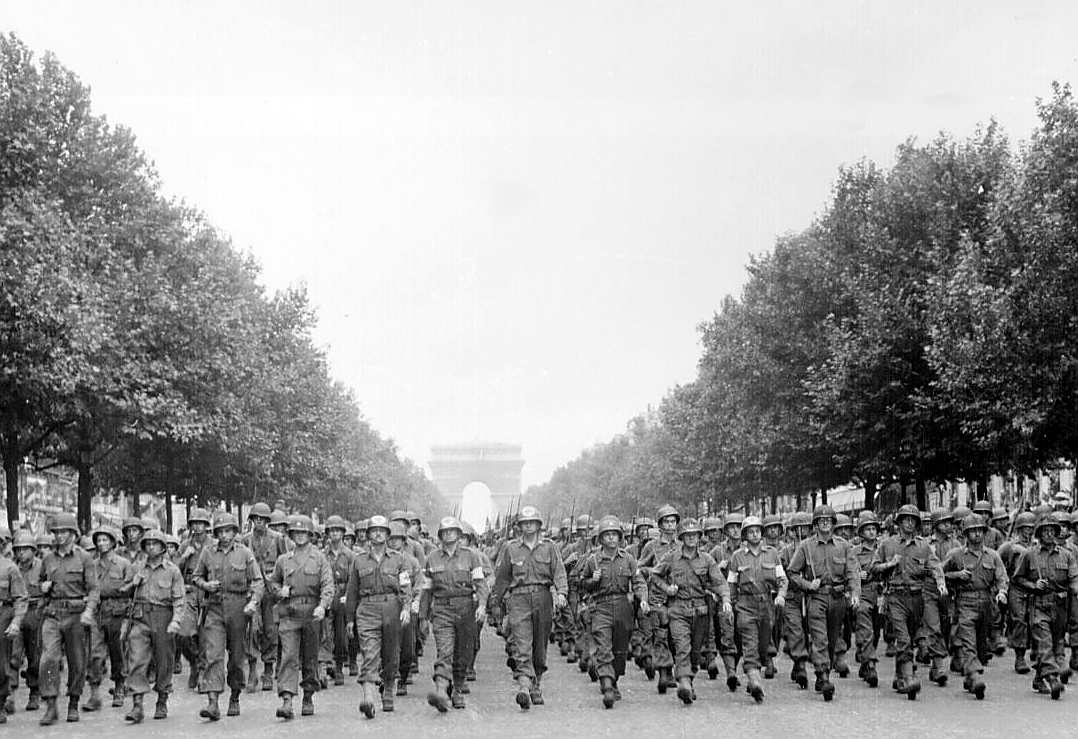
    28th Infantry Division marches down the Champs Élysées, 29 Aug 1944.
- 1944
  - 20–21 April – Allied bombing of gare de la Chapelle-Saint-Denis in 18th arrondissement kills 650 persons. Marshal Pétain attends the funeral on 23 April, his first visit to Paris since 1940.
  - 6 June – Allied forces land at Normandy. French Resistance groups in Paris, largely led by the Communist Party, begin organizing an uprising.
  - 19 August – As Allied forces approach Paris, the French resistance seizes the telephone exchange, ministries and public buildings, including the Prefecture of Police, which is defended against the Germans by two thousand policemen. About 1,500 resistance fighters are killed in the uprising, including about six hundred civilians.
  - 24 August – At General de Gaulle's insistence, The 2nd French Armored Division of General Philippe Leclerc and the U.S. 4th Infantry Division head for the city. They encounter heavy resistance from the Germans in the suburbs, but less in the center.
  - 25 August – The German commander, General Choltitz, refuses to carry out Hitler's order to destroy the city's monuments. At four in the afternoon, at gare Montparnasse, he surrenders the city to General Leclerc.
  - 25 August – General Charles de Gaulle arrives at gare Montparnasse, and is shown Choltitz' surrender. In the evening, he gives a speech to the crowd from the balcony of the Hôtel de Ville.
  - 26 August – General de Gaulle arrives at three in the afternoon at the Arc de Triomphe and walks down the Champs-Élysées to the Place de la Concorde, acclaimed by a huge and delirious crowd.
  - 29 August – Parade of the US 28th Infantry Division down the Champs Élysées to Place de la Concorde.
  - 1 September – Provisional French government led by de Gaulle established in Paris.
  - 18 December – Le Monde newspaper begins publication.
  - Épuration, or purge, of Parisians who collaborated with the Germans. 9,969 persons were arrested, of whom 211 were executed, and 1616 acquitted. The others received prison sentences. Many suspected collaborators left Paris and went abroad.
- 1945
  - 29 April – First municipal elections after the war, and the first French elections in which women could vote. Six parties take part: the Communists take thirty percent of the vote and 27 council seats out of ninety, making them the largest group in the council.
  - 9 May – Film Les Enfants du Paradis (Children of Paradise) by Marcel Carné, made during the German occupation, opens in Paris.
  - 21 October – Communists and socialists win majority of seats in the first parliamentary elections after the war.

=== 1946–1967 ===
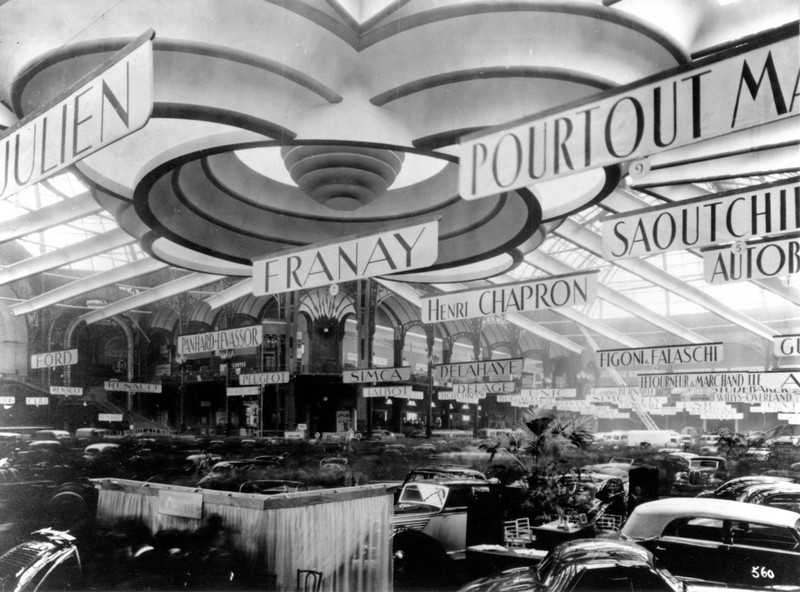
Recovering from the war. Paris automobile show in 1946.

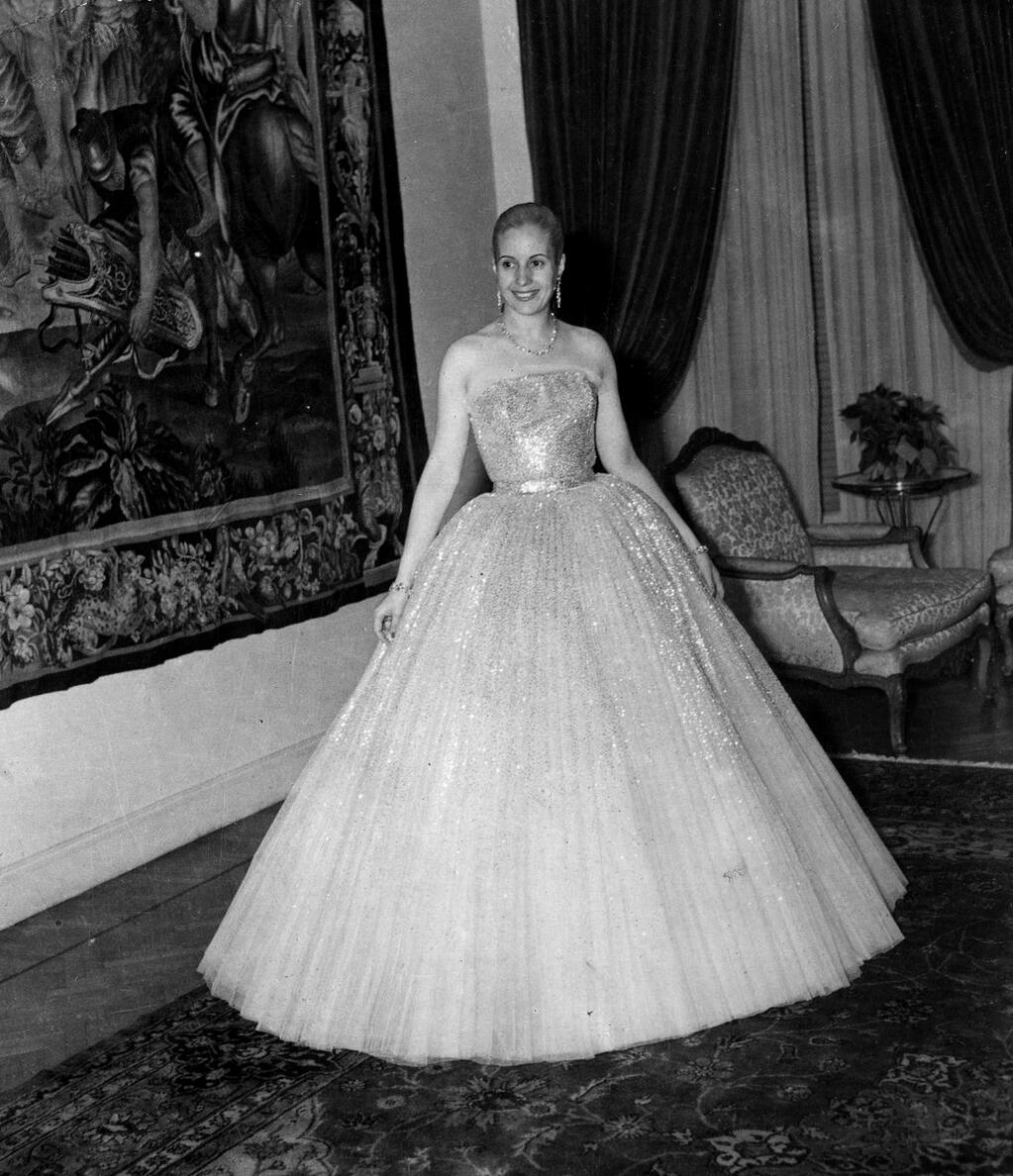
High fashion became a major French export after the war. A gown by Christian Dior worn by Eva Peron (1950)

- 1946
  - Population: 2,725,374
  - 1 January – Rationing of bread re-established, and continues until 1 February 1949.
  - 3 February – First issue of the sports newspaper L'Équipe published.
  - 5 April – Socialist government nationalizes the private gas and electricity companies.
  - 23 April – Houses of prostitution ordered closed.
- 1947
  - 12 February – First major fashion show after the war organized by Christian Dior at 30 Avenue Montaigne. High fashion became an important French export industry and foreign – currency earner.
  - 25 April – Communist trade union begins strike at Renault factory.
  - 5 May – Split between communists and socialists. New socialist Prime Minister Paul Ramadier dismisses communist ministers from French government.
  - June – Communist unions organize strikes and work stoppages of railroad and bank employees.
  - The Bread ration reduced to 200 grams per person, less than during the German Occupation.
  - Founding of the Magnum Photos agency.
  - 20 October – The Rassemblement du peuple français, a new center-right party led by Charles de Gaulle, wins Paris municipal elections, with 52 seats on the council out of ninety. The Communists win twenty-five seats, the socialists win five.
  - November – Communist trade unions organize strikes of metal workers, public employees, teachers, and railroad workers in an effort to bring down the government, and call a general strike for December 1. Railroad lines are sabotaged. The navy, army and firemen are called in to keep electricity networks and the metro running.
  - 9 – The Communists call off the general strike.
- 1948
  - 21 March – The Régie autonome des transports parisiens (RATP) organized, a single authority to manage Paris public transport.
  - 26 June – Inauguration of Paris-Orly airport, at the time the largest airport in Europe.
  - 10 December – The United Nations General Assembly adopts the Universal Declaration of Human Rights at the Palais de Chaillot.
  - 15 December – Startup of Zoé, the first French nuclear reactor, designed by Frédéric Joliot-Curie, located at the Fort de Châtillon.
  - The World Association of Newspapers opens headquarters in city.
- 1949
  - 25 March – Paris Match magazine begins publication.
  - 29 June – First Paris television newscast. Only a few hundred Parisians have television sets to watch it.
- 1950
  - 11 February – Minimum wage (Salaire minimum interprofessionnel garanti, or SMIG), established by government.
  - 13 April – First issue of the magazine L'Observateur, later Le Nouvel Observateur.
  - Founding of the Centre d'études et de recherches internationales.
- 1951
  - 1 May – First demonstrations in Paris of Algerians demanding independence from France.
- 1952
  - 18 May – Large demonstration on the Champs-Élysées of Algerians supporting independence for Algeria.
  - 28 May – Violent confrontations between Communist demonstrators and police over visit of U.S. General Matthew Ridgway. Several hundred persons injured.
- 1953
  - 26 April to May 3 – The Paris municipal elections won by center right – coalition formed with left republicans (RGR), Gaullists (RPF) and independents.
  - 14 July – Violent confrontations between Communists and Algerian independence supporters and the police. Seven persons are killed, and one hundred twenty-six injured.
- 1954
  - Population: 2,850,189
  - 1 February – Abbé Pierre issues an appeal for the city to aid the homeless.
  - 1 August – Ordnance forbids Parisians to honk their car horns "except in case of danger."
  - 1 November – War of independence begins in Algeria, with serious repercussions in Paris. Numerous killings in Paris of members of two rival Algerian factions, the Front de Libération Nationale (FLN), or National Liberation Front, and the Mouvement national algérien (MNA), and large demonstrations are organized by the Communists and Algerian nationalists.
- 1955
  - 15 September – Renault workers win three weeks of paid vacation.
- 1956
  - Short film – The Red Balloon released, set in Paris. It won the Academy Award in 1956 for best original screenplay.
  - 7 November – Following the suppression of the Hungarian uprising by Soviet troops, large demonstrations take place outside Communist Party headquarters in Paris. When the name of the place outside their building is changed to the name of Lajos Kossuth, a Hungarian anti-Russian patriot, the Communists move to a new location on place du Colonel-Fabien.
  - 8 November – New metro cars running on rubber wheels instead of steel wheels begin service between Châtelet and Mairie des Lilas.
- 1958
  - 19 May – Following a revolt by the French military in Algiers on 13 May, Charles de Gaulle holds a press conference at the Palais d'Orsay offering to form a new government, "If the people wish."
  - 1 June – De Gaulle is invested as head of government by the National Assembly.
  - 28 September – Proposed Constitution of the Fifth French Republic approved by the National Assembly.
- 1959
  - 27 April – Demolition begins of the Vélodrome d'Hiver.
  - 30 December – Rock singer Johnny Hallyday performs on radio program Paris-Cocktail and becomes an instant star.
- 1960
  - 20 March – Paris police creates an auxiliary force of Muslim policemen to combat increasing terrorist attacks coming from the Algerian War.
  - 12 April – Inauguration of the autoroute du Sud a highway from Paris to the south of France via Lyon.
- 1961
  - 6 January – First bomb attacks in Paris by the Organisation armée secrète (OAS), an armed terrorist group fighting to keep Algeria as part of France.
  - 24 April – Opening of expanded Paris-Orly airport.
  - 29 August – The Paris wing of the FLN, the major underground group fighting for Algerian independence, begins a campaign of killing French policemen, particularly Muslim auxiliaries. Thirteen policemen are killed between 29 August and 3 October.
  - 5 October – Paris municipality imposes a curfew on Algerians (French Muslim of Algeria), advising them to be off the streets between 8:30 p.m. and 5:30 a.m.
  - 17 October – Between thirty and forty thousand Algerians stage an illegal but peaceful march against the curfew, marching in four columns to the center of the city. The police violently breaks up the demonstration, arresting six to seven thousand persons. Trapped by the police, some demonstrators jump or are thrown off the pont Saint-Michel. The number of persons killed has never been reliably established; estimates vary widely from thirty to fifty dead to over two hundred. (See Paris massacre of 1961 for one point of view of the events).
- 1962
  - Population: 2,790,091.*
  - 17 January – Seventeen bombs explode planted by the OAS, demanding continued French rule over Algeria.
  - 8 February – Illegal anti-OAS demonstration by FLN and Communists is suppressed by the police. Eight persons are killed, most of them crushed by the crowd trying to take sanctuary in the Charonne metro station. (For one point of view of the event, see The Charonne Metro Station Massacre.)
  - 4 August – Malraux Law, named for French Culture Minister André Malraux, requires that façades of Paris buildings be cleaned of decades of soot and dirt. Cleaning begins.
- 1963
  - Landmarks such as the Cathedral of Notre-Dame-de-Paris change in color from dark grey to white after cleaning.
  - 5 November – Construction begins of the university campus of Nanterre.
  - 14 December – Inauguration of Maison de la Radio.
- 1964
  - 13 January – Decision made to build a new airport at Roissy-en-France to replace Le Bourget.
  - 14 March – France is divided into twenty-one regions, including Paris.
  - June – First Festival du Marais takes places.
  - 10 July – New law divides the Paris region into eight departments.
- 1965
  - 29 October – Mehdi Ben Barka, leader of the opposition in Morocco, is kidnapped in front of the Brasserie Lipp. His body is never found.
  - 27 December – Singer Mireille Mathieu performs for the first time at the Olympia Theater.
- 1966
  - 4 May – Founding of the Banque Nationale de Paris (BNP).
- 1967
  - 21 April – The last duel is fought in the Bois de Boulogne between two members of the French National Assembly, Gaston Defferre and René Ribière (who lost the duel).
  - 29 November – Autoroute opens from Paris to Lille.
  - 22 December – Highway opens along the Left Bank of the Seine (now the Promenade des Berges de la Seine.)

=== 1967–1980 ===
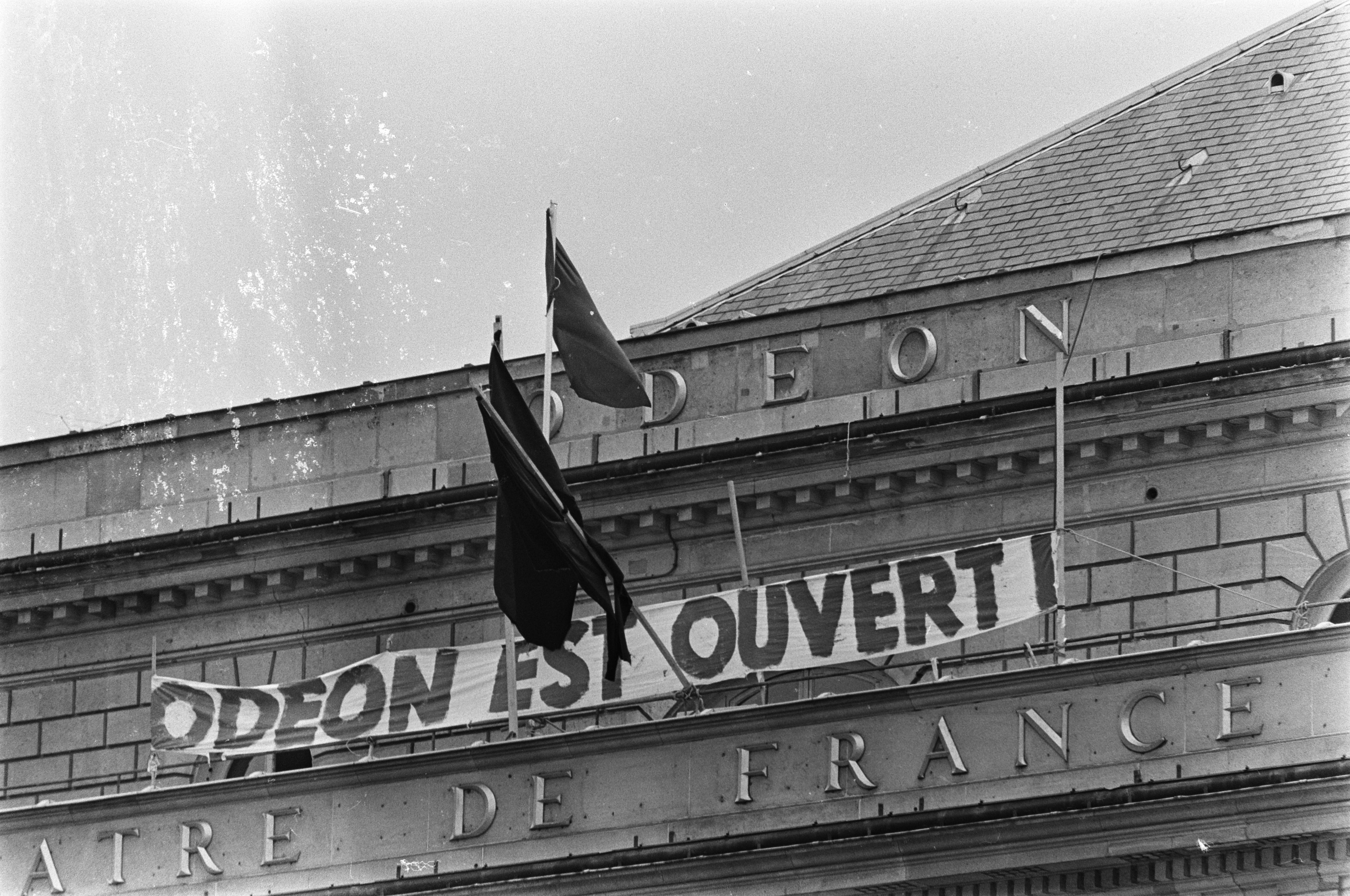
Red flags on the Odeon Theatre, occupied by demonstrators (May 1968).

- 1968
  - Population: 2,590,771
  - 22 March – Coalition of Trotskyists, Maoists and anarchists organizes anti-government demonstrations at University of Nanterre.
  - 3 May – Student demonstrations spread to the Sorbonne campus, and police are called in.
  - 6 May – The violent confrontations between demonstrators and police in the Latin Quarter leave eight hundred persons injured.
  - 10 May – Barricades go up on rue Gay-Lussac, and a night of rioting.
  - 13 May – The CFDT trade union and other unions support the students, and join in a large joint demonstration.
  - 20 May – A general strike paralyzes the city. The Communists denounce Daniel Cohn-Bendit and other student leaders, because many have a Maoist ideology.
  - 25 May – Prime Minister Georges Pompidou negotiates a labor agreement with the CGT and other unions, concluded on May 27.
  - 27 May – Large meeting of students, socialist party and CFDT at the Charléty stadium calls for bringing down the government of President Charles de Gaulle. Socialist leader François Mitterrand is proposed as a candidate for president, with Pierre Mendès France as prime minister.
  - 30 May – President de Gaulle launches a counter-offensive; he dissolves the National Assembly and calls for new elections 23 June and June 30. A demonstration on the Champs-Élysées.of an estimated one million persons supports de Gaulle.
  - June – The student leaders deny the authority of the President and call for more demonstrations. The Communist-backed unions of the CGT announce that they have no objections to new elections. The government raises the minimum wage by 35 percent, and most union members gradually go back to work. The last barricades are removed 20 June. The official statistics for the May events show 1,910 policemen injured, and 1,459 demonstrators injured. Damage to the streets (the removal of cobblestones to make barricades) is calculated at 2.5 million francs.
  - June – Gaullist candidates win an absolute majority in the National Assembly. In Paris, the vote for the Communist candidates falls to eighteen percent from thirty percent in the previous elections.
- 1969
  - 28 February – The central market at Les Halles is moved outside the city to Rungis.
  - 14 December – The first line of the Réseau Express Régional or RER, from the city center to the suburbs, opens between Nation and Boissy-Saint-Léger.
- 1970
  - 20 February – RER suburban line to the west opens between Place de l'Étoile and La Défense.
  - 26 August – The first feminist demonstration, by the Mouvement de libération de la femme (MLF) takes place at the Arc de Triomphe.
  - Paris Saint-Germain Football Club formed.
  - Responding to the events of 1968, the University of Paris is broken up into thirteen autonomous universities
- 1971
  - 7 March – Opening of the Paris-Orly west airport.
  - In the Paris municipal council elections Gaullist and center-right candidates win forty-six out of ninety seats; the Communists win twenty seats and the socialists seven.
  - 3 July — Death of Jim Morrison, American lead vocalist of the rock band the Doors.
  - Festival d'automne à Paris begins.
  - The demolition begins of the historic pavilions of Les Halles, the central wholesale food market, whose function had been moved to the suburb of Rungis in 1969.
- 1972
  - 2 February – The opening of the Musée national des arts et traditions populaires (Museum of Arts and Popular Traditions) in the Bois de Boulogne.
  - 22 April – Demonstration by the ecology movement in Paris; a parade of five thousand cyclists between Porte Dauphine and Porte de Vincennes.
  - 14 June – Opening of the Museum of Cinema at the Palace of Chaillot. Henri Langlois receives an Oscar d'honneur
  - Parc des Princes (stadium) rebuilt.
- 1973
  Opening of the Tour Maine-Montparnasse, the first (and only) skyscraper in Paris (13 September 1973)
  - 25 The – Completion of the last segment of the Boulevard périphérique around Paris.
  - 13 September – Opening of Tour Maine-Montparnasse, the first (and last) skyscraper in central Paris—said to have the most beautiful view of the city because it's the one place from which one cannot see the Tour Montparnasse.
  - The first Paris Fashion Week held.
- 1974
  - 28 February – The opening of the Palais des congrès de Paris convention hall at Porte Maillot.
  - 8 March – The Charles de Gaulle Airport opens.
  - 27 May – Valéry Giscard d'Estaing is elected President of the French Republic. He abruptly cancels several of the major Paris projects begun by President Georges Pompidou, including the highway along the left bank of the Seine, a skyscraper at Place d'Italie, and an international commerce center at Les Halles.
- 1975
  - Population: 2,299,830
  - 31 December – The National Assembly gives Paris the same status as other French cities, with an elected mayor.
  - Bazooka (art group) active.
- 1976
  - 13 September – The École polytechnique (Polytechnique) moves from the center of Paris to Palaiseau.
- 1977
  Centre Georges Pompidou opens (31 January 1977).
  - 31 January – Centre Georges Pompidou inaugurated.
  - 25 March Jacques Chirac becomes the first elected mayor of Paris since 1793. He centralizes municipal power in the mayor's office, creating the positions of twenty-five deputy mayors and restricting the meetings of the municipal council to one meeting a month, no longer than one day long.
  - 8 December – New station Gare de Châtelet – Les Halles opens, connecting metro with the regional RER lines.
- 1978
  - 7 March – Radical leftist group called "Les autonomies" pillages twenty-four shops on rue La Fayette.
  - The Eurovision Song Contest 1978 was held.
  - 1 May – "Les autonomes" attack eighty-three Paris stores after the traditional May Day demonstration.
- 1979
  - 13 January – Stores around the Gare Saint-Lazare are vandalized by "Les autonomes".
  - 23 March – Following a peaceful demonstration by communist mine workers, "Les autonomes" vandalize 121 stores and shops in Paris. More than two hundred persons are injured.
  - 1 May – The "Nuit bleu" (Blue night). A dozen bombs are set off by Corsican nationalists, who set off more bombs on 2 May and 31 May.
  - 4 September – Inauguration of the Forum des Halles, on the site of the former central market.
- 1980
  - 28 January – First anisettes, automated individual pay toilets for Paris streets, authorized.
  - 12 June – First terrorist attack at Paris-Orly airport by the anarchist-communist revolutionary organization Action directe. Seven people wounded.
  - 3 October – Terrorist attack on the synagogue on rue Copernic. Four persons are killed and twenty injured.

=== 1981–1999 – Mitterrand era ===
- 1981
  - 10 May – François Mitterrand elected President of the French Republic. He is the first socialist president of the Fifth Republic and the first leftist president in 23 years.
  - 22 May – First Salon du Livre book fair opens at the Grand Palais.
  - 2 September – The inauguration of the TGV high-speed train line between Paris and Lyon.
- 1982
  - Population: 2,176,243.
  - 7 February – Corsican terrorist group FLNC sets off seventeen bombs in the Paris region.
  - 22 February – Car bomb on rue Marbeuf kills one and injures sixty-three. The Syrian secret services are suspected of organizing the attack.
  - 21 June – First Fête de la Musique festival in the Paris streets and parks.
  - 30 June – New socialist majority in the National Assembly tries to make the office of Paris mayor ceremonial, and hand over real power to the mayors of the twenty arrondissements. Their effort, opposed by Mayor Jacques Chirac, fails.
  - 9 August – A Palestinian terrorist group places a bomb at the Jo Goldenberg restaurant on rue des Rosiers in Le Marais, killing six persons and wounding twenty-two.
  - 17 September – A bomb placed in the car of an Israeli diplomat in front of the Lycée Carnot injures forty-seven persons.
- 1983
  - 13 March – In the Paris municipal elections, Jacques Chirac and center-right candidates win 68 percent of the vote and eighteen out of twenty arrondissements. Only the 13th and 20th arrondissements give a majority to the left.
  - 15 July – The Armenian militant group ASALA explodes a bomb at the check-in counter of Turkish Airlines at Paris-Orly airport. Eight persons, including a child, are killed, and fifty-four injured.
- 1984
  - 12 January – Inauguration of the Zenith concert hall in the Parc de la Villette.
  - 3 February – Inauguration of the Palais Omnisports sports complex in Bercy.
  - 24 June – A million people demonstrate in defense of Catholic and private schools in the capital.
- 1985
  - 26 January – First Restaurant du Cœur opens, a charity established by French comedian Coluche, providing meals to the indigent.
  - 23 February – Bomb explodes at Marks and Spencer department store on Boulevard Haussmann; one person is killed and fifty injured.
  - 6 May – Opening of La Géode at the Cité des sciences et de l'industrie at Parc de la Villette.
  - 26 August – the artist Christo wraps the Pont Neuf in yellow-gray plastic.
  - 23 September – Musée Picasso inaugurated.
  - 7 December – Radical Islamic group explodes bombs at Galeries Lafayette and Printemps department stores; forty one persons injured.
- 1986
  - 3–5 February – Radical Islamic group explodes several bombs around city; about twenty persons injured.
  - 13 March – opening of the Cité des sciences et de l'industrie (City of Science and Industry), a science museum at La Villette.
  - 20 March – Bomb explodes in the Galerie Point-Show on the Champs-Élysées. Two persons are killed.
  - 4 May – First Paris Marathon takes place, with eleven thousand participants.
  - 9 July – Action-Directe terrorist group explodes a bomb at the headquarters of the police brigade charged with fighting terrorism. One person is killed and twenty-two injured.
  - 17 September – Bomb attack on Tati store on rue de Rennes kills seven and injures fifty-six. Between September 4 and September 17, attacks by radical Islamic groups kill eleven persons and injure city-six.
  - 1 December – Opening of the Musée d'Orsay, featuring 19th century French art.
  - 4–5 December – Students demonstrate against the Devaquet project for university reform. The Minister resigns and the reform plan is withdrawn.
- 1987
  - 29 June – Police lay siege to the Iranian Embassy in France, until an Iranian diplomat implicated in the bombings of 1986 appears before a judge and then is expelled from France back to Iran.
  - 30 November – Inauguration of the Arab World Institute (Institut du monde arabe) building.
- 1988
  - 4 March – President Mitterrand inaugurates the Louvre Pyramid, part of the Grand Louvre, the first of his grand projects for Paris.
  - 14 July – President Mitterrand announces project to construct a new national library.
  - Mayor Jacques Chirac defeats President Mitterrand in Paris in the first round of the Presidential elections, but in the second round Mitterrand wins Paris by 58 to 42 percent. Mitterrand receives an absolute majority in nine Paris arrondissements.
- 1989

Grande Arche of La Défense inaugurated (18 July 1989)

  - 19 March – Paris municipal elections won by center-right Rassemblement pour la République (RPR) and Union pour un mouvement populaire (UMP) parties. Of the 163 municipal council seats, 140 are won by the center-right, 18 by the socialists; three communists are elected, and one ecologist.
  - 14 October – Inauguration of the Grand Louvre.
  - 13 July – Opening of the Opéra Bastille, on the eve of the bicentennial of the French Revolution.
  - 18 July – Inauguration of the Grande Arche de la Défense.
  - 20 September – Inauguration of the TGV Atlantique line from Paris to Le Mans.
  - 3 October – Opening of the Cité de la Musique at La Villette.
- 1990
  - Population: 2,152,423.
- 1991
  - 1 August – First class cars on the metro are taken out of service.
  - 7 November – Prime Minister Édith Cresson decrees that about twenty government institutions, including the École Nationale d'Administration, (ENA) will be moved outside of Paris. ENA goes to Strasbourg. The move is highly unpopular with government officials.
- 1992
  - 12 April – EuroDisney opens in Marne-la-Vallée, 25 km east of Paris.
- 1993
  - 28 March – Center-right parties dominate legislative elections in Paris. Socialists win only one out of twenty-one seats.
  - 18 May – Opening of the TGV train line between Paris and Lille.
  - 8 July – The floating swimming pool Deligny, first placed in the Seine in 1796, sinks.
  - 20 November – Inauguration of the Richelieu wing of the Louvre, the second phase of the Grand Louvre project.
  - 26 December – City of Paris begins a medical doctor service called SAMU (Service d'aide médicale d'urgence) providing emergency medical treatment at home.
- 1994
  - 31 March – Violent demonstrations over changes in French labor laws; cars burned and stores pillaged.
  - 14 July – First Bastille Day parade on Champs-Élysées with participation of 200 German soldiers of the Eurocorps.
  - November – Eurostar railway service between Paris and London begins.
- 1995
  - 30 March – Opening of new Bibliothèque Nationale de France, the last of Mitterrand's grand projects, at Bercy.
  - 7 May – Paris Mayor Jacques Chirac wins the second round of the French presidential elections over Lionel Jospin. He wins 60 percent of the vote in Paris.
  - 22 May – Deputy Mayor Jean Tiberi replaces Chirac as the new mayor of Paris. He is formally elected by the municipal council on 25 June.
  - 14 June – First scandals emerge about Paris city government, involving attribution of city-owned luxury apartments at low rents to government officials.
  - 25 July – Bomb explodes on an RER train at the Saint-Michel station. Seven are killed, eighty-four injured. The attack is blamed on Algerian Islamists.
  - 17 August – A bomb explodes in a garbage can on avenue de Friedland at corner with Place Charles de Gaulle-Étoile, injuring seventeen people.
  - 6 October – Bomb explodes nearmetro station Maison-Blanche; thirteen persons are injured.
  - 17 October – Bomb explodes on RER train between Musée-d'Orsay and Saint-Michel stations; twenty-nine persons are injured. The attacks are blamed on the Armed Islamic Group of Algeria.
  - The Hôtel Costes opens.
- 1997
  - 31 August – Death of Diana, Princess of Wales in an automobile accident in the Pont de l'Alma road tunnel.
- 1998
  - Paris hosts the finals of the 1998 World Cup, won by France.

== 21st century ==
- 2000
  - 1 January – Eiffel Tower lit with sparkling lights for first time, to mark the new century.
- 2001
  - 18 March – Election of Bertrand Delanoë, the first socialist and first openly gay mayor of Paris. The socialists and greens take 49.63 percent of the vote, compared with 50.37 percent for the center-right candidates, but the left wins a majority of the seats in the municipal council, which selects the mayor.
- 2002
  - 5 October – First Nuit Blanche festival, with museums and cultural institutions remaining open all night long.
  - 5 October – Mayor Delanoë is stabbed but not seriously injured by a deranged unemployed man, outside the Hôtel de Ville.
  - Palais de Tokyo art exhibit space opens.
- 2003
  - Inauguration of Festival Paris Cinéma.
- 2004 – International Salon for Peace Initiatives begins.
- 2005
  - 27 October to 14 November – Riots of young residents of the low-income housing projects of the Paris suburbs and then across France, burning schools, day-care centers and other government buildings and almost nine thousand cars. The riots caused an estimated 200 million euros in property damage, and led to almost three thousand arrests. On 14 November 2005, as the riots ended. President Jacques Chirac blamed the rioters for a lack of respect for the law and for French values, but also condemned inequalities in French society and "the poison of racism."

Musée du quai Branly opens (20 June 2006)

- 2006
  - April–June – Protest demonstrations against changes in labor laws take place on the campuses of several Paris universities.
  - 20 June – Opening of Musée du quai Branly, museum of Oceania, Africa, Asia and the Americas.
  - Local Urbanism Plan enacted.
- 2007
  - 15 July – Mayor Delanoë inaugurates Vélib', a system for inexpensively renting 15,000 to 20,000 bicycles placed at special stands around the city.
  - Paris City History Committee created.
- 2008
  - Facing growing costs for social programs, Mayor Delanoë announces a 9.7 percent increase to local taxes and a new 12 percent tax on property owners.
- 2009 – Population: 2,234,105
- 2013
  - 12 February – Seven activists from the radical feminist group Femen bare their breasts inside the Cathedral of Notre Dame de Paris to demonstrate against the doctrines of the Catholic Church.
  - 19 June – Inauguration of the Promenade des Berges de la Seine, a city park located on 2.3 kilometers of the former highway along the left bank of the Seine.
  - Paris Musées, a non-profit organization created in 1985 to manage the fourteen city-owned museums, is turned into public institution overseen by the city government.
- 2014
  - 17 March – One-day limited traffic ban in effect due to a peak in air pollution.
  - 30 March – Election of Anne Hidalgo, the first woman mayor of Paris.
  - 17 June – Mayor Hidalgo announces that the city budget deficit will increase to 400 million Euros in 2014, due to a reduction in support from the national government and a growth of spending on social services.
  - 19 September – City officials announce plan to gradually remove more than seven hundred thousand locks attached by tourists to the Pont des Arts as symbols of love. Officials said the weight of the locks damaged the bridge and altered its historic appearance.
  - 20 October – Louis Vuitton Foundation art museum opens.

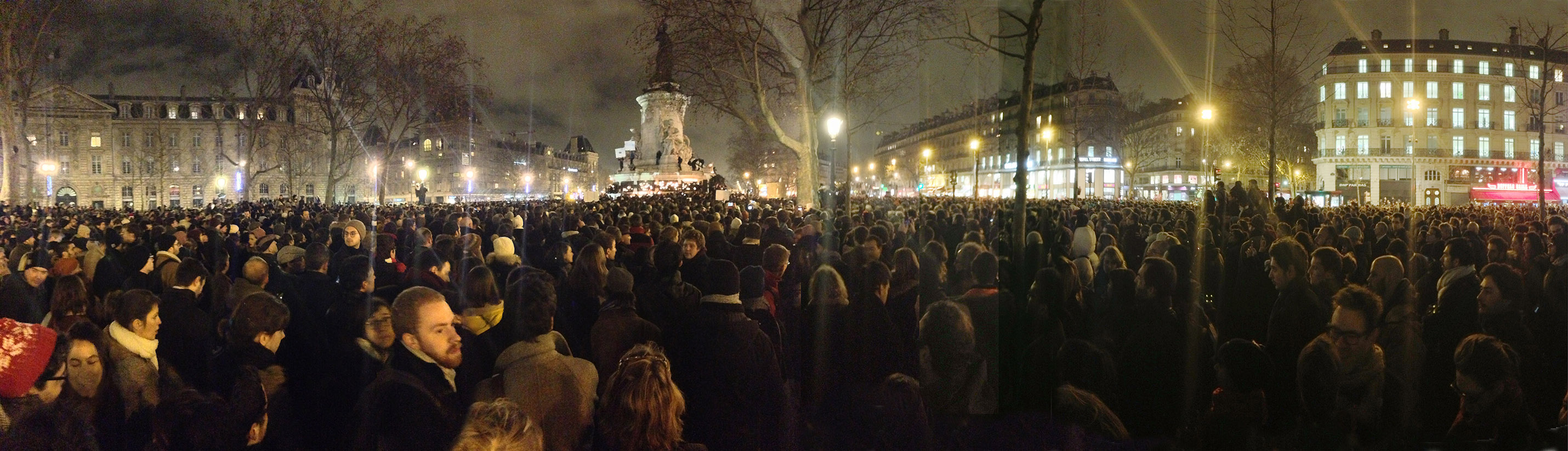
Anti-terrorism demonstration on Place de la République after Charlie Hebdo shooting (11 January 2015)

- 2015
  - 7–9 January – 17 people, including three police officers, are killed in five terrorist attacks by Muslim extremists, one known as the Charlie Hebdo shooting, targeting the headquarters of Charlie Hebdo, a satirical magazine, and the other occurring at a Jewish grocery store.
  - 11 January – An estimated 1.3 million persons demonstrate in Paris against terrorism and for freedom of speech following the terrorist attack at Charlie Hebdo.
  - 14 January 2015 – President Hollande inaugurates the city's new symphony hall, the Philharmonie de Paris, designed by architect Jean Nouvel, at Parc de la Villette. The opening concert is dedicated to the victims of the Charlie Hebdo shooting.
  - 25 June – Three thousand Paris taxicab drivers go on strike, blocking roads to the airports and train stations, burning two cars, and damaging seventy others. Seven policemen were injured. Taxi drivers were protesting against competition from other vehicle for hire companies such as Uber.
  - 13 November – Simultaneous terrorist attacks took place in Paris, carried out by three coordinated teams of terrorists. The Islamic State of Iraq and the Levant claimed responsibility for the attacks. The gunmen opened fire at several sidewalk cafes, exploded two bombs near the Stade de France stadium, where a match between Germany and France was taking place, and killed more than eighty persons at the Bataclan theater, where a concert was about to take place. In all, the attackers killed 130 persons and injured 368, of whom 42 were still in a critical state on 16 November. Seven terrorists took part, and killed themselves by setting off explosive vests. French president François Hollande declared that France was in a nationwide state of emergency, reestablished controls at the French border, and brought fifteen hundred soldiers into Paris. Schools and universities and other public institutions in Paris were ordered closed. It was the most deadly recorded terrorist attack to take place in France.
  - 30 November to 12 December – The 2015 United Nations Climate Change Conference is held.

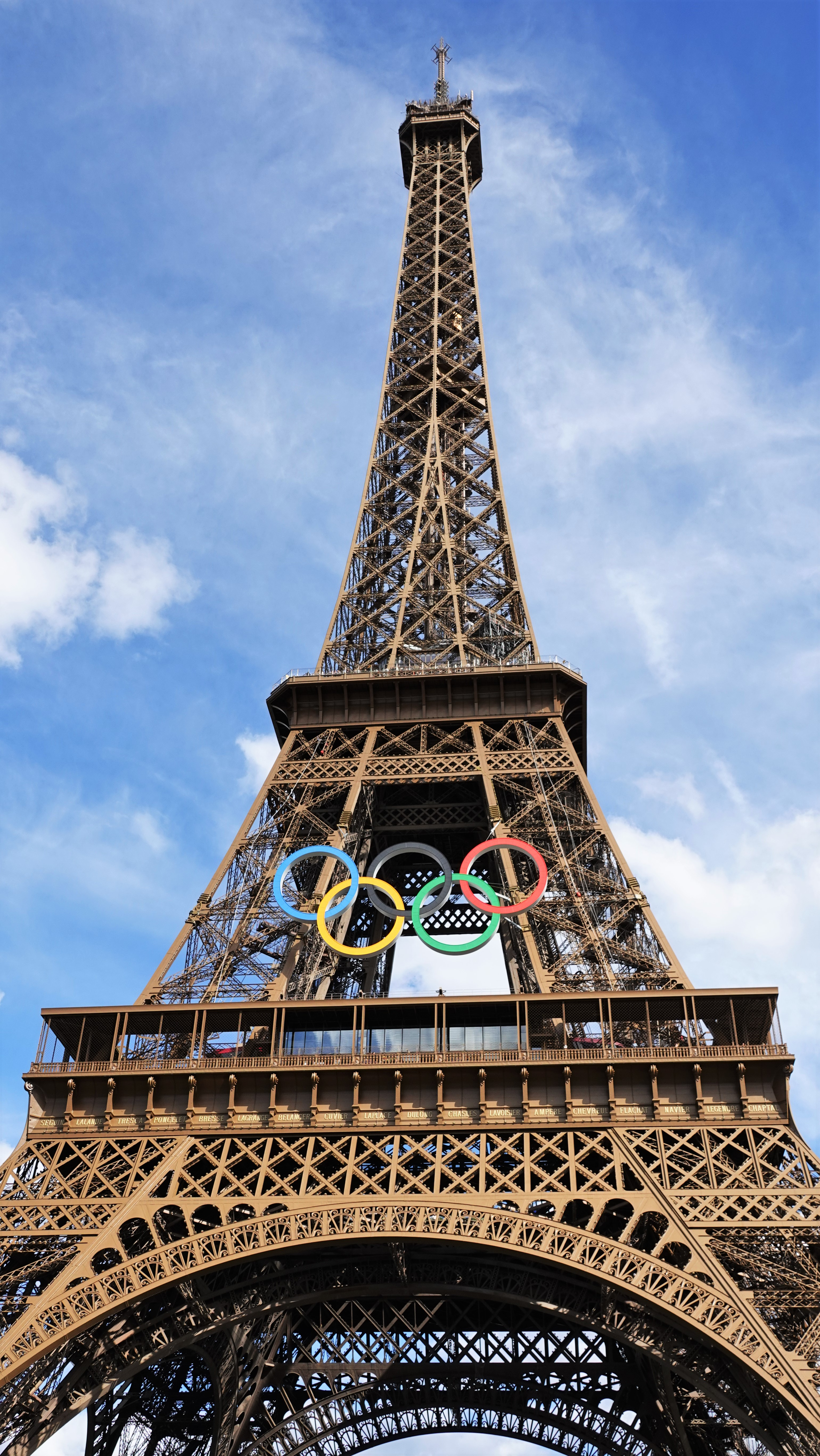
The Olympic rings on the Eiffel Tower

- 2016
  - 1 January – Grand Paris comes to existence.
  - May – Car-free Champs-Élysées begins once per month.
  - 10 July – UEFA Euro 2016 final is held at the Stade de France.
- 2019 – 15 April: Notre-Dame de Paris fire destroys the roof of the cathedral and causes extensive damage to the interior.
- 2020 – 16 March: COVID-19 pandemic in France causes Paris to go into COVID-19 lockdowns.
- 2021 – Junior Eurovision Song Contest 2021 held.
- 2022 – 28 May: 2022 UEFA Champions League final chaos occurs.
- 2023 – 2023 Paris bedbug infestation.
- 2024 – The 2024 Summer Olympics and 2024 Summer Paralympics are held between July to September.
- 2025 – 19 October: 2025 Louvre heist.
- 2026 – 22 March: Election of socialist Emmanuel Grégoire as mayor of Paris.

== Evolution of the Paris map ==
=== 12th century ===
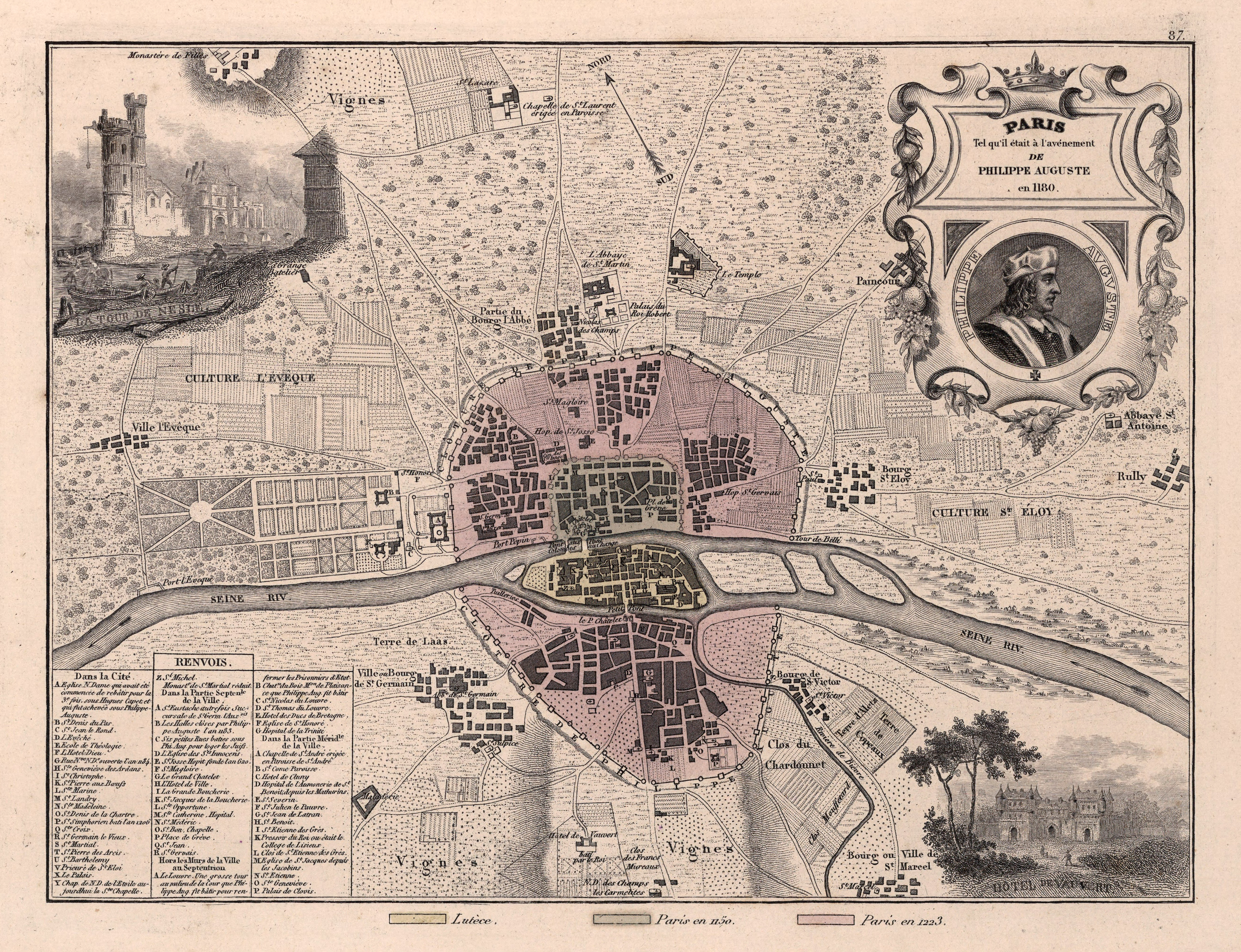
1180

=== 16th century ===
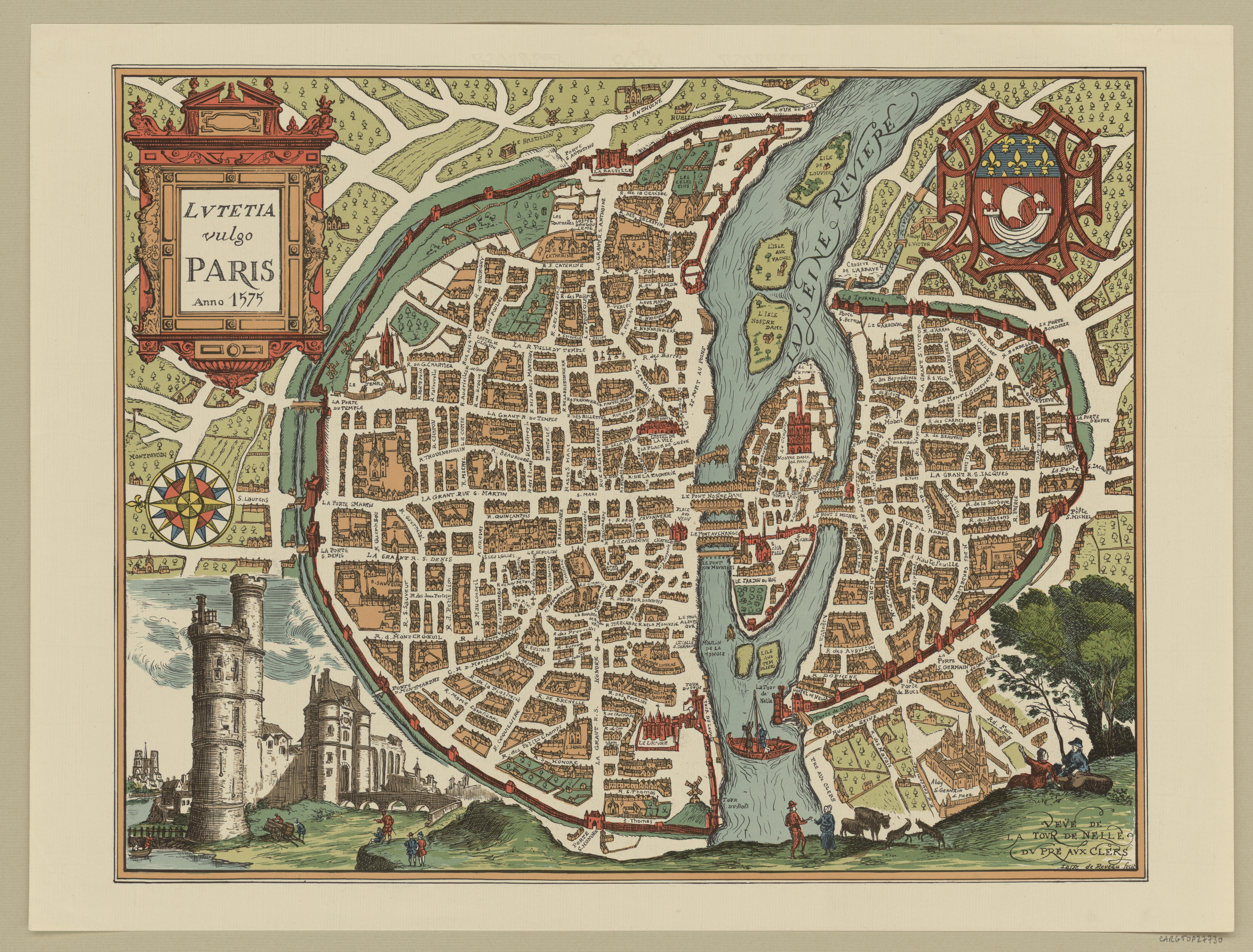
1575

=== 17th century ===
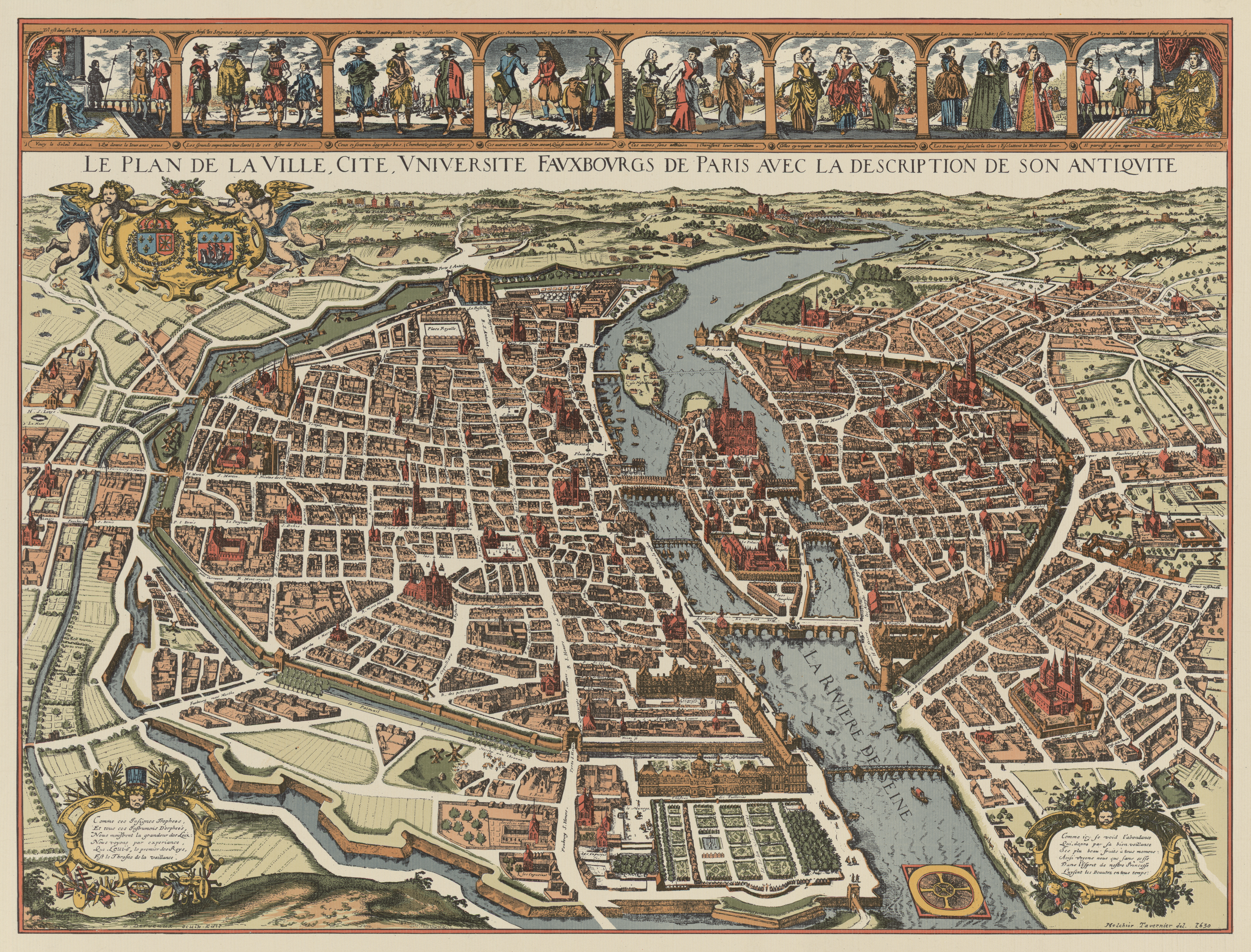
1615

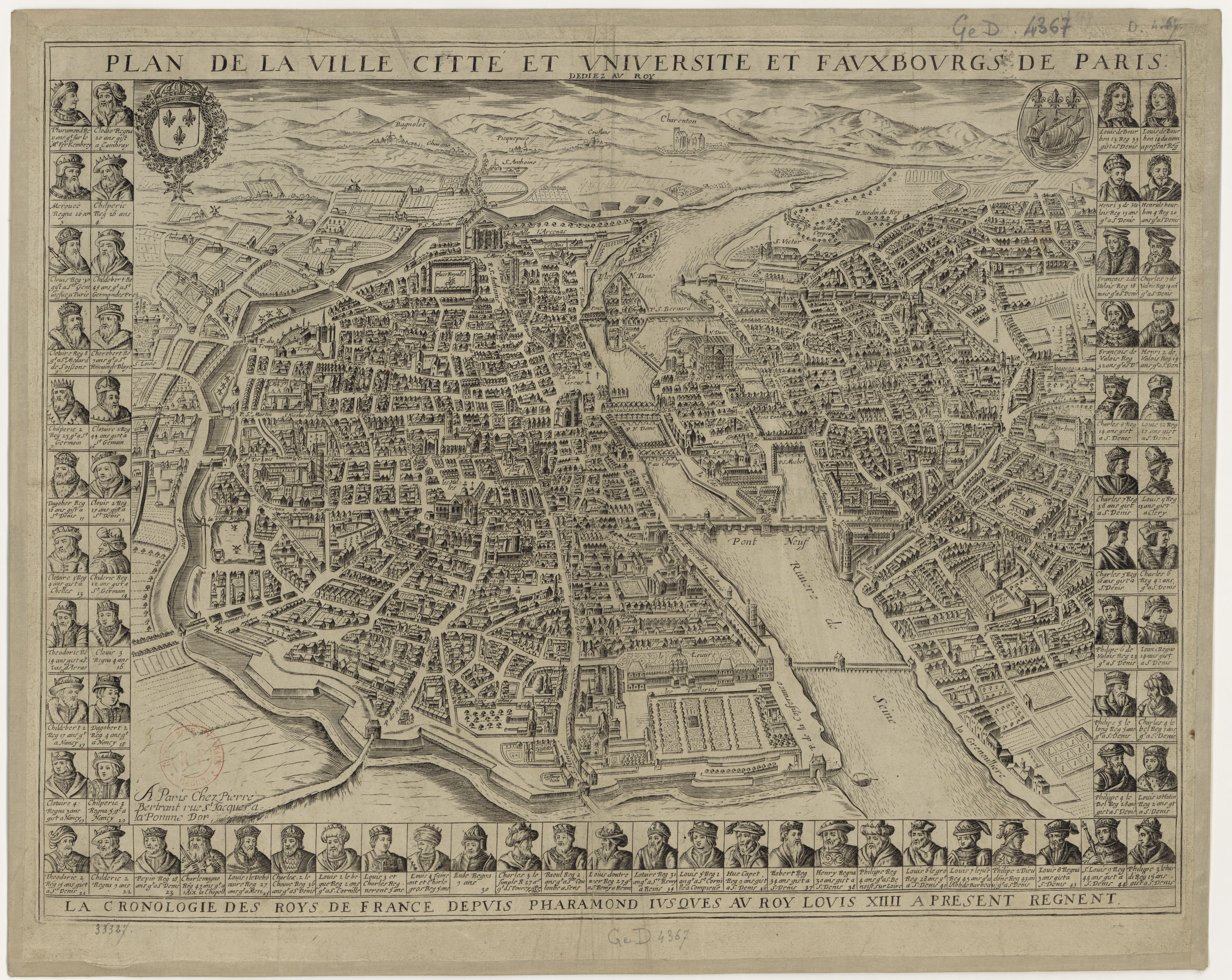
1650

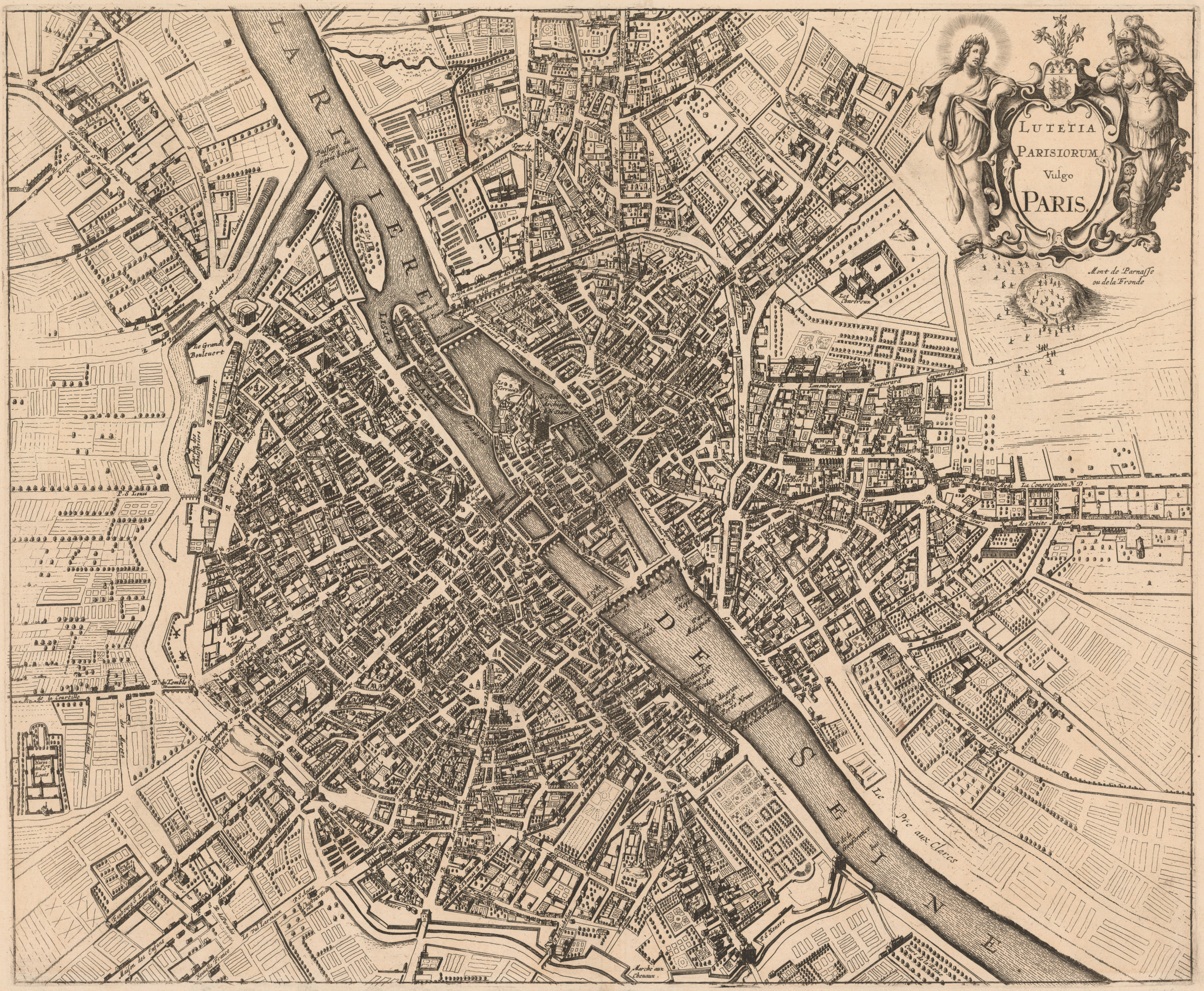
1682

=== 18th century ===
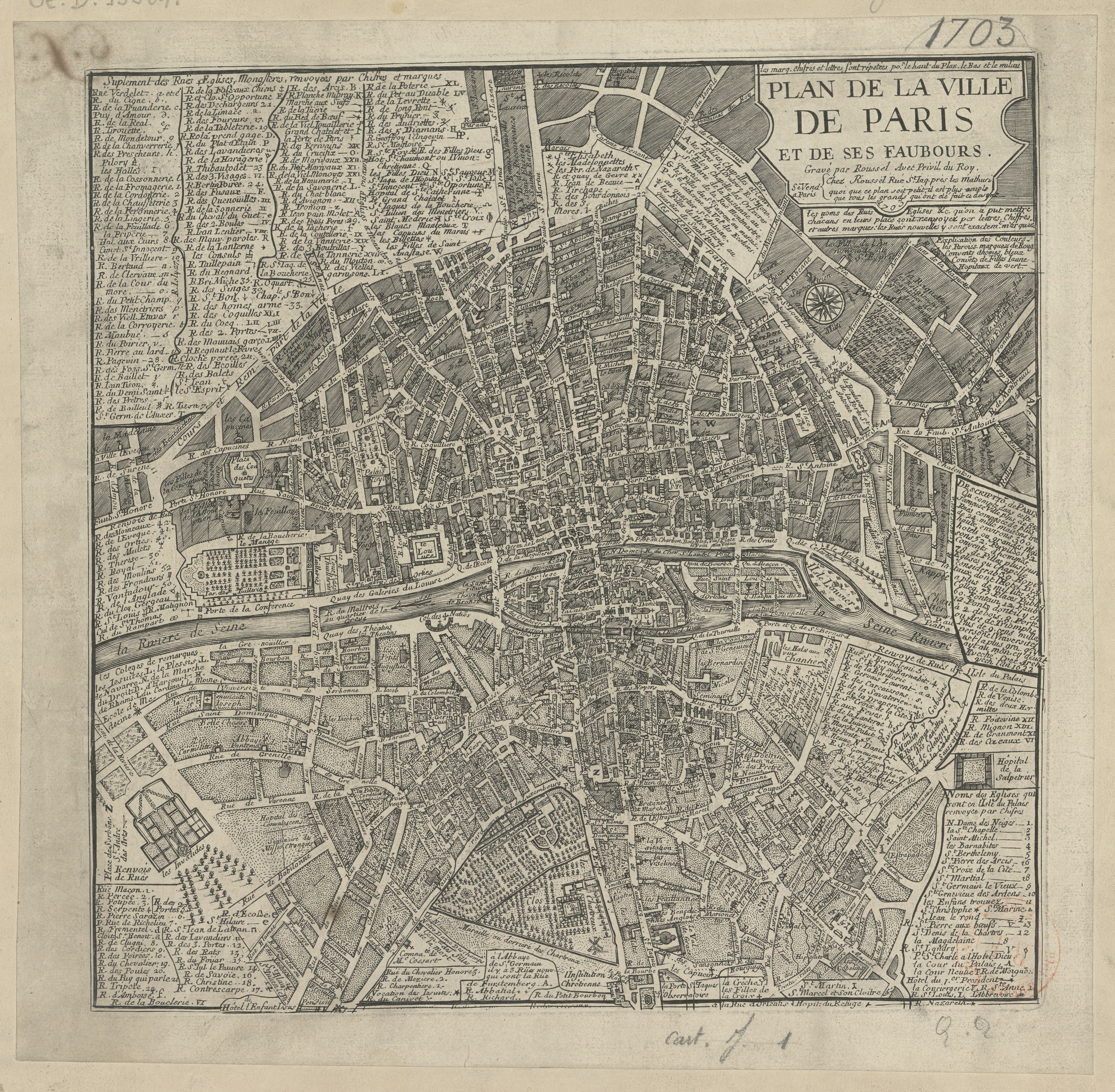
1703

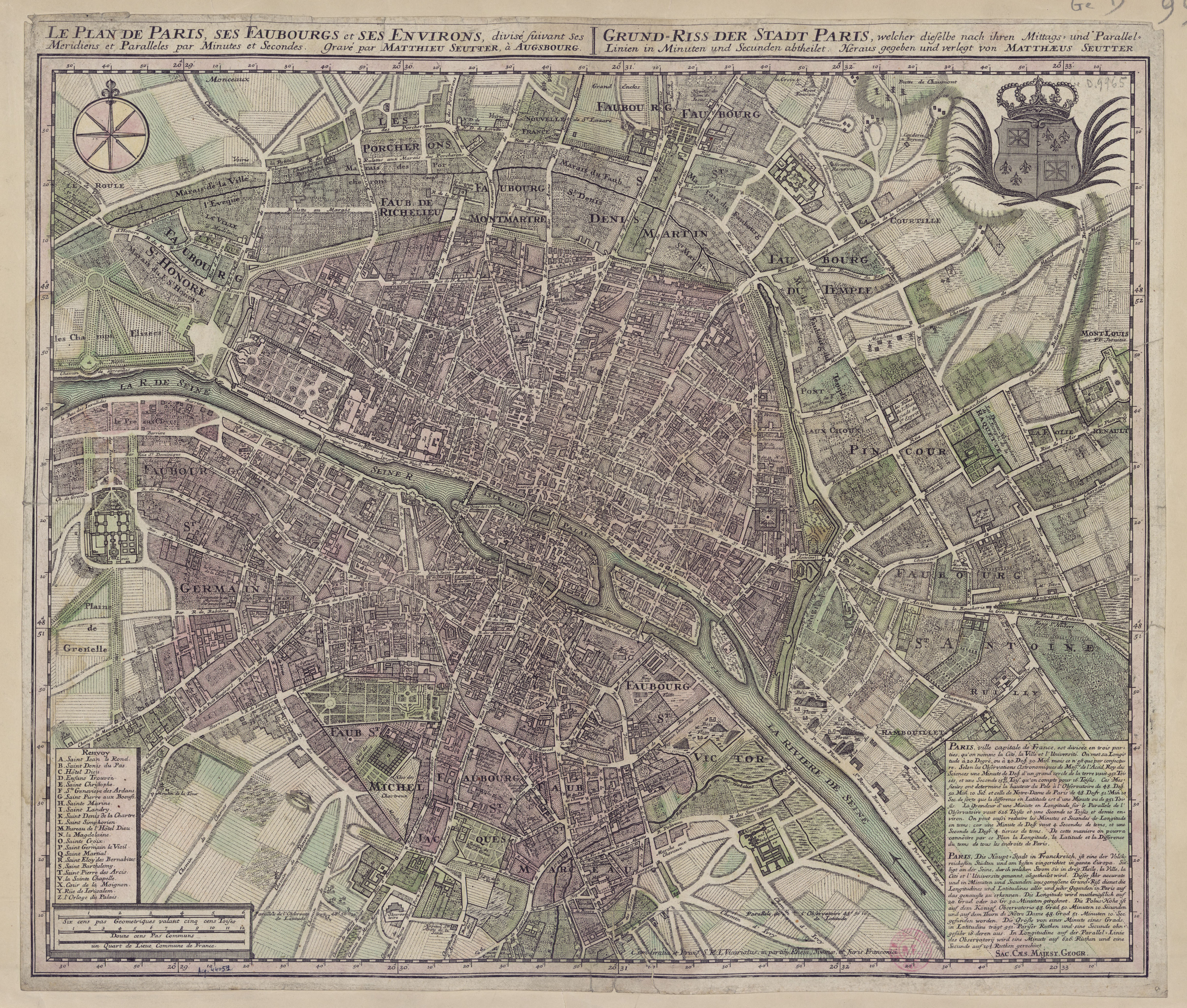
1720

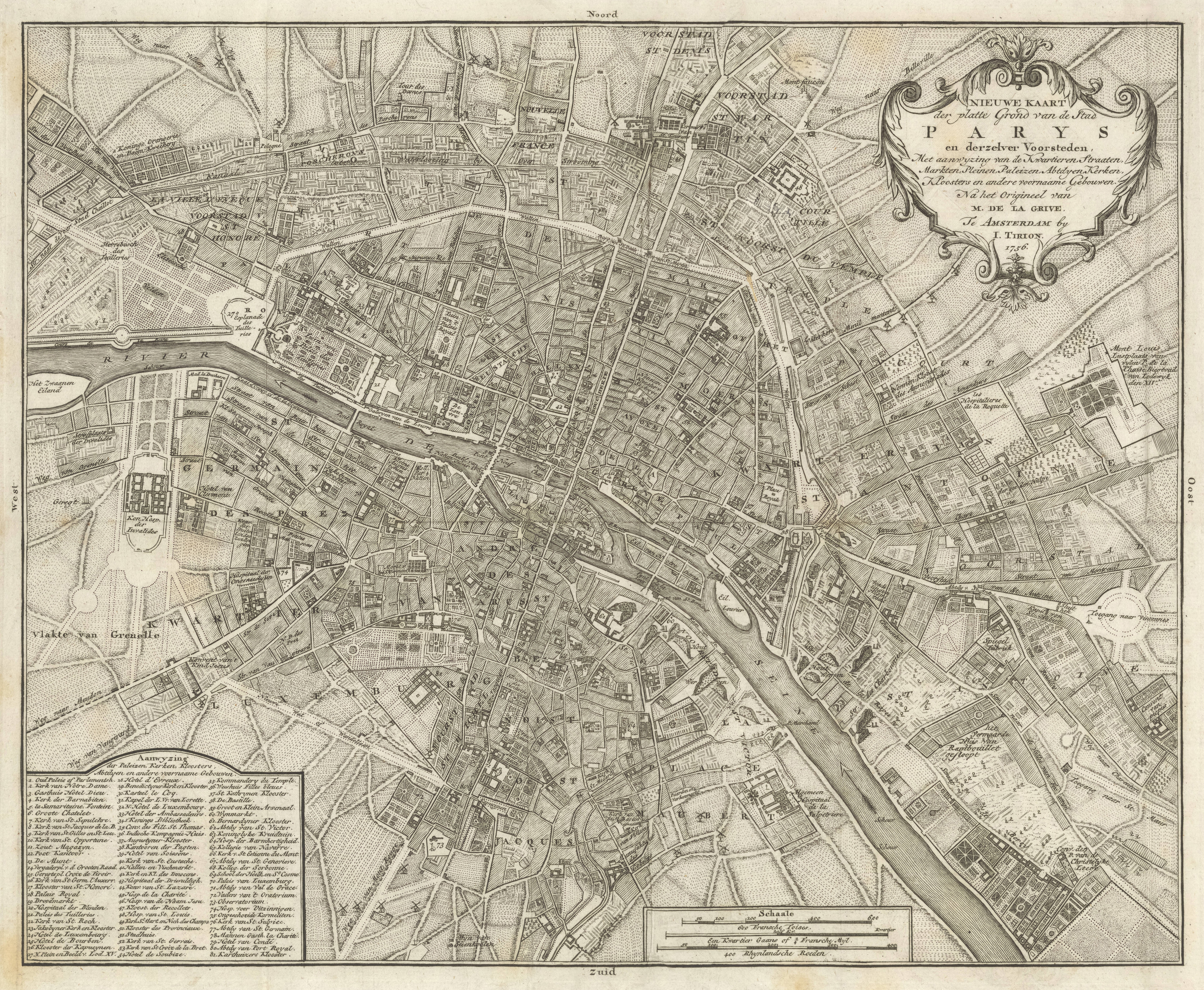
~1741

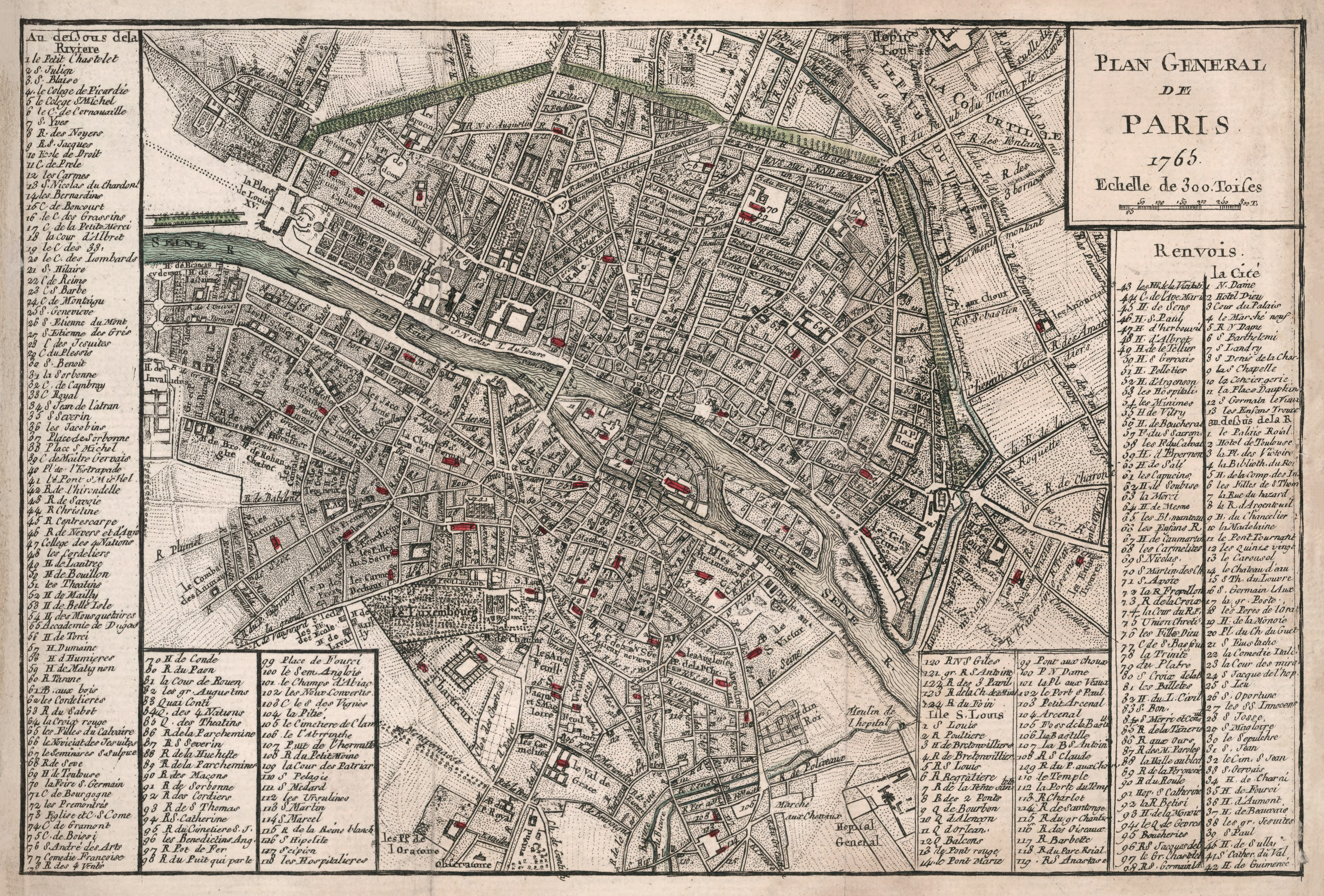
1765

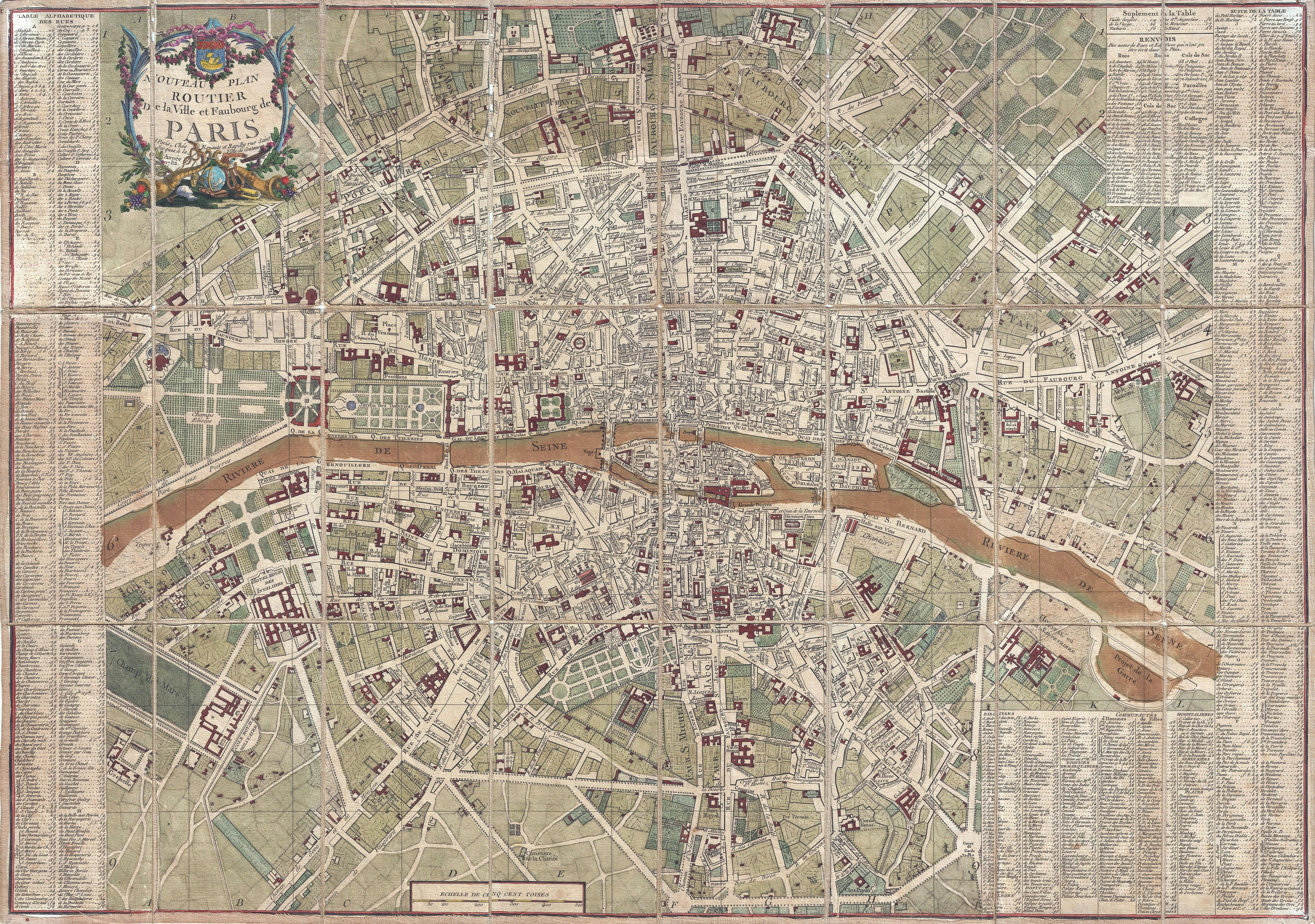
1782

1784

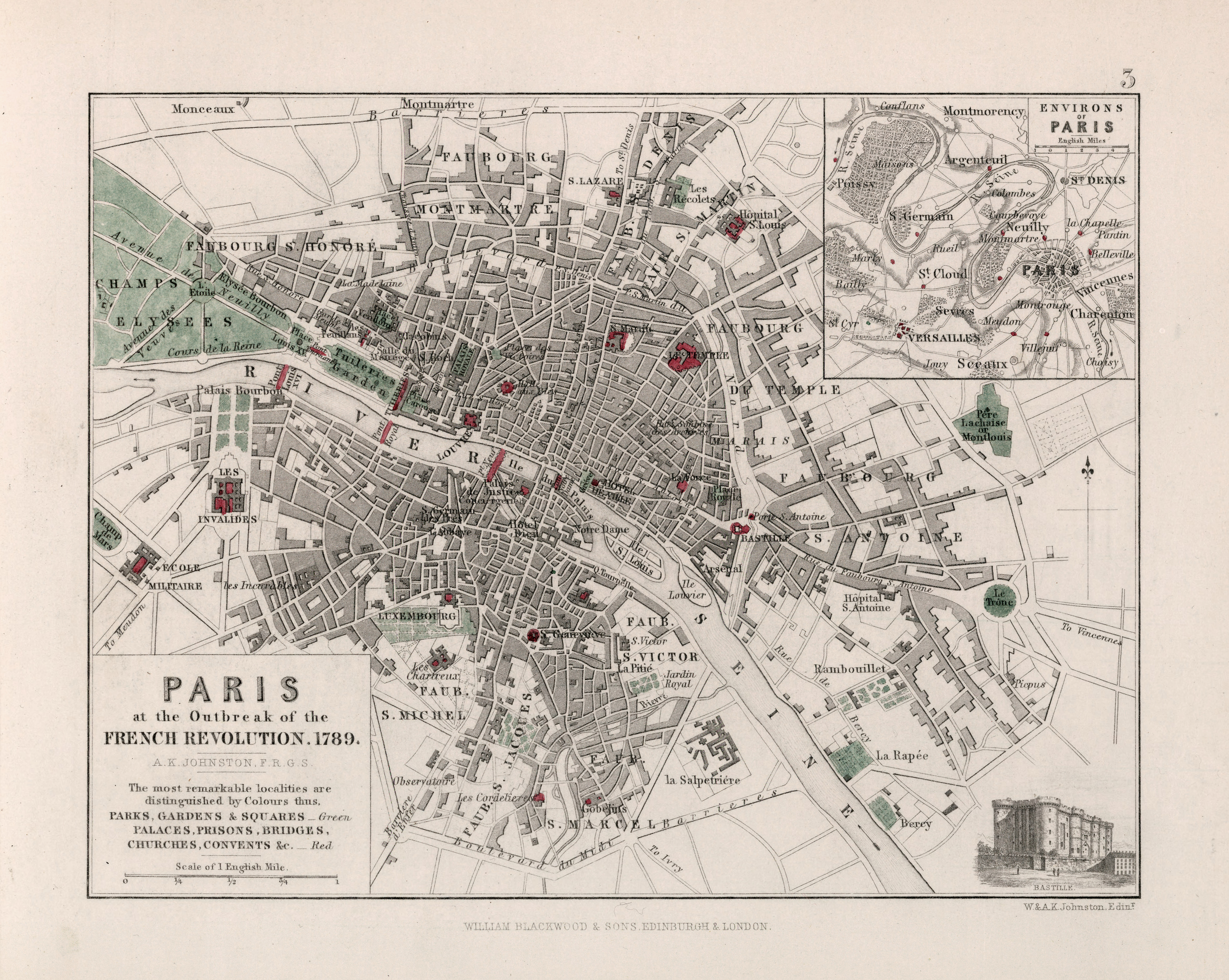
1789

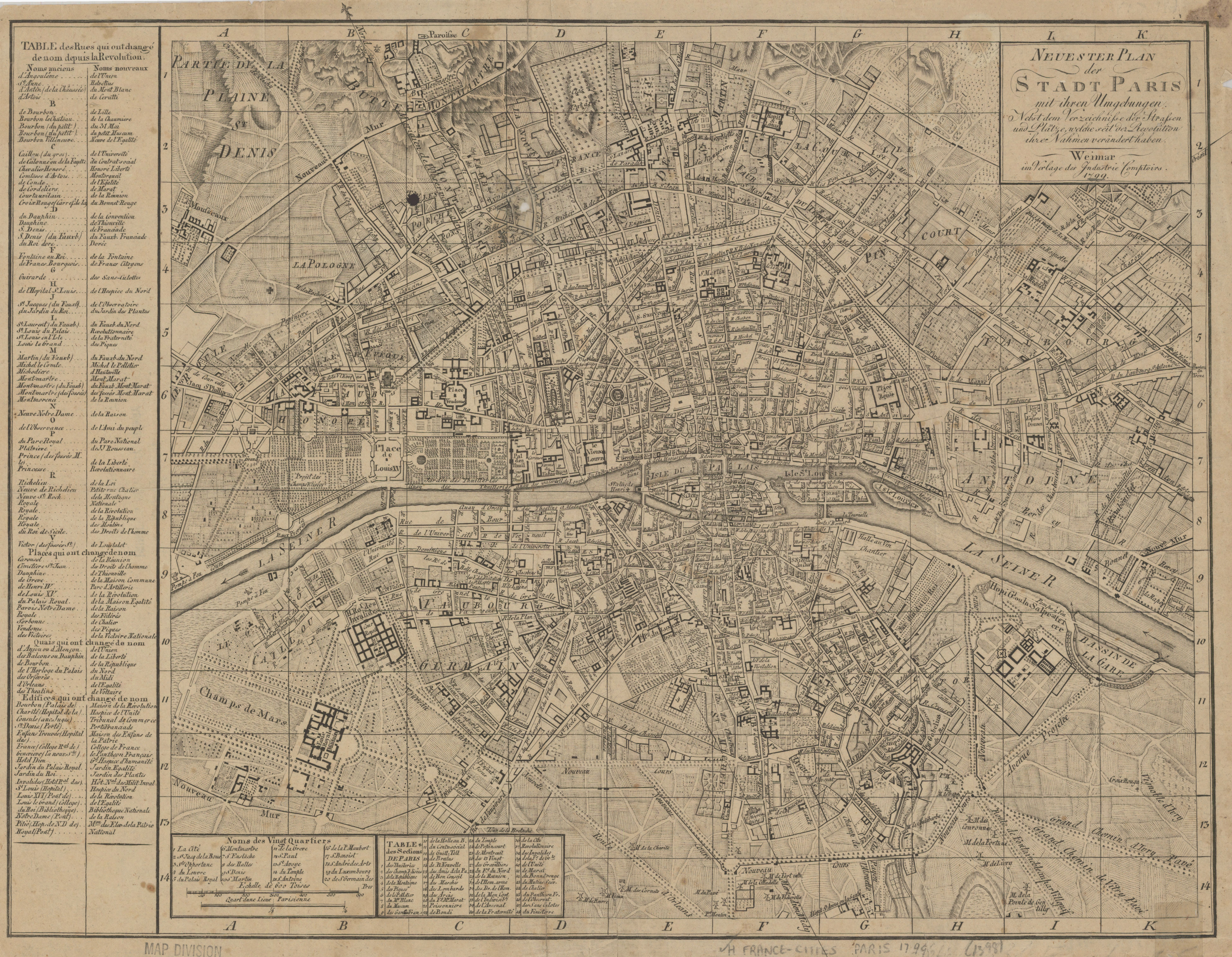
1799

=== 19th century ===
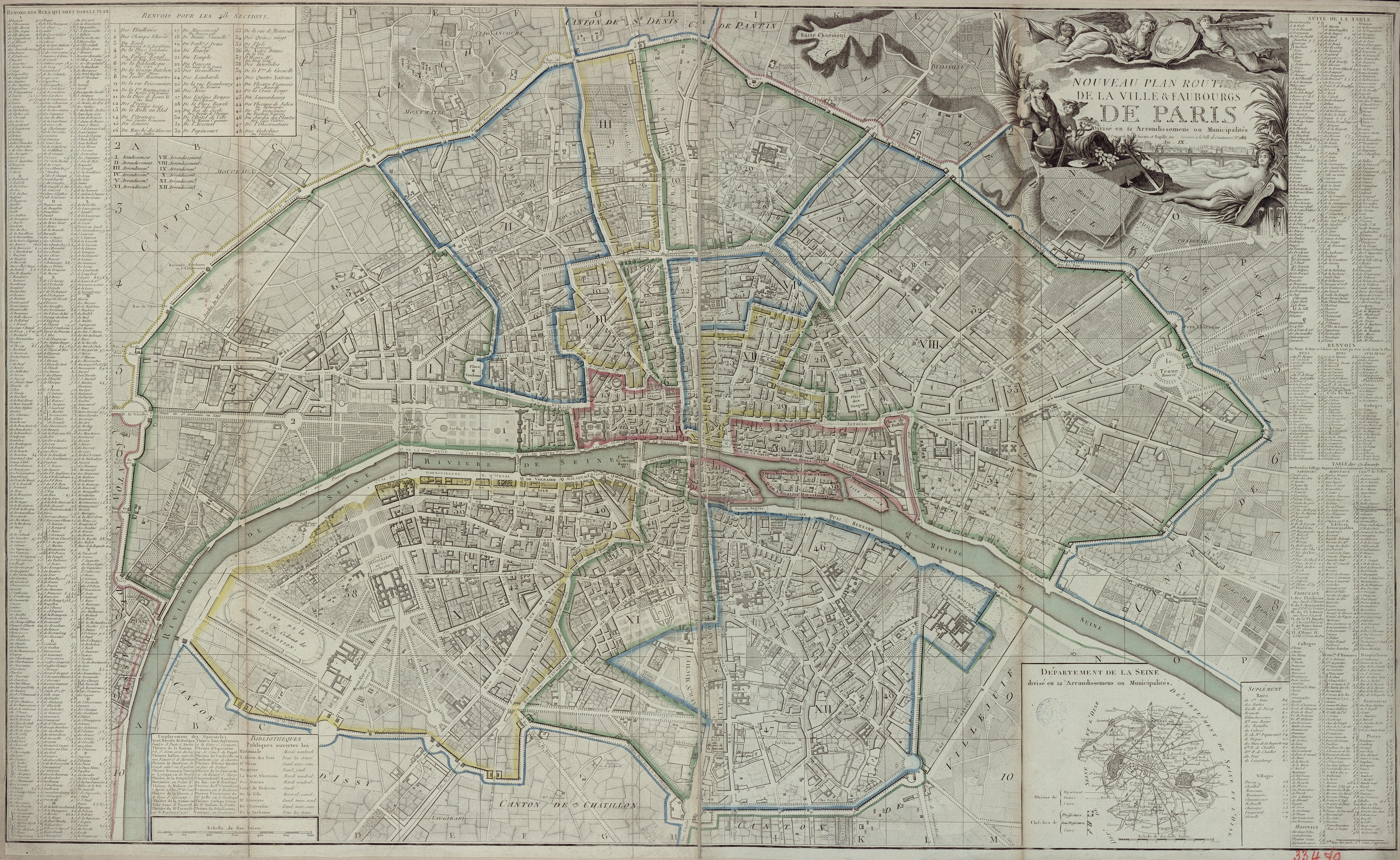
1801

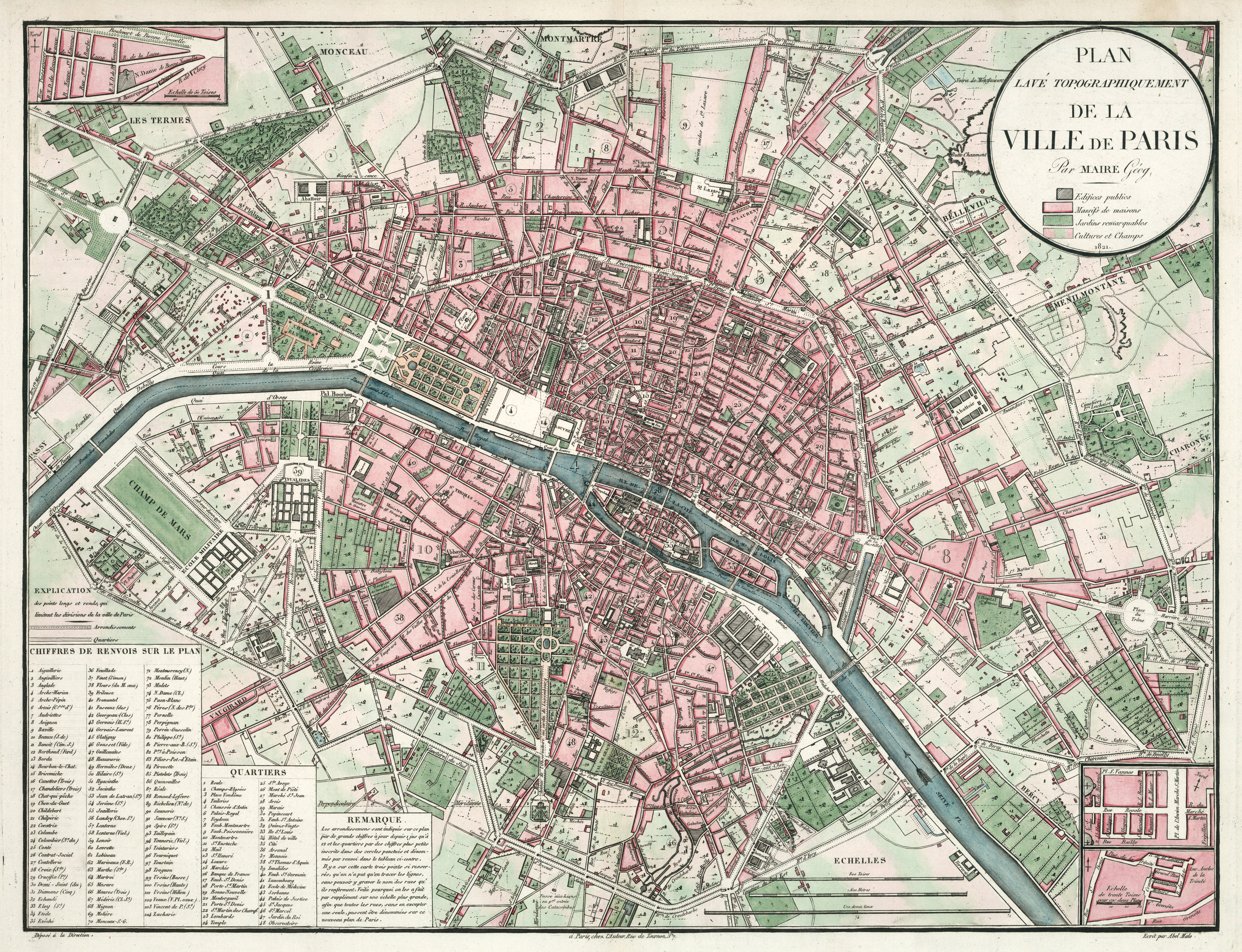
1821

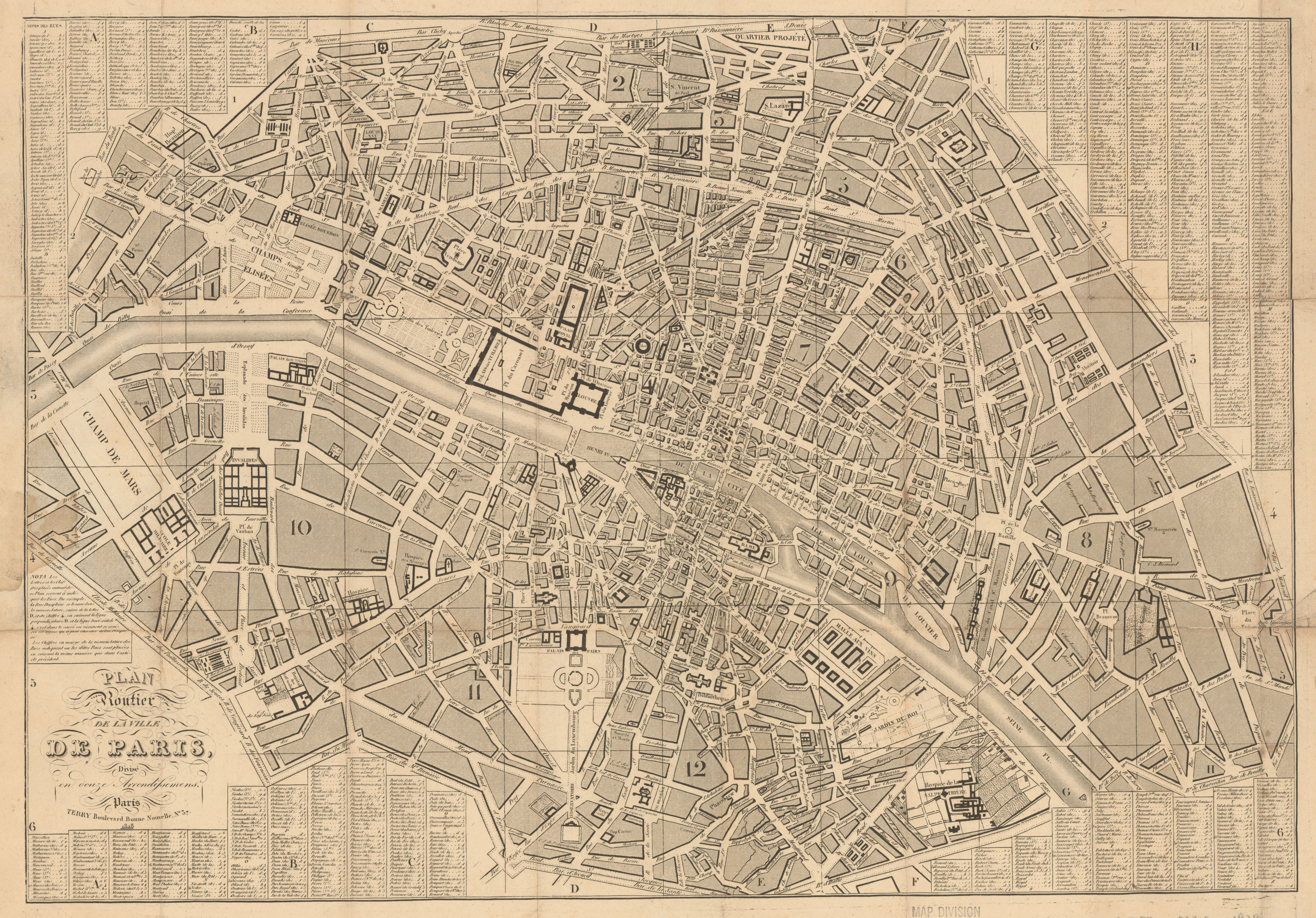
1828

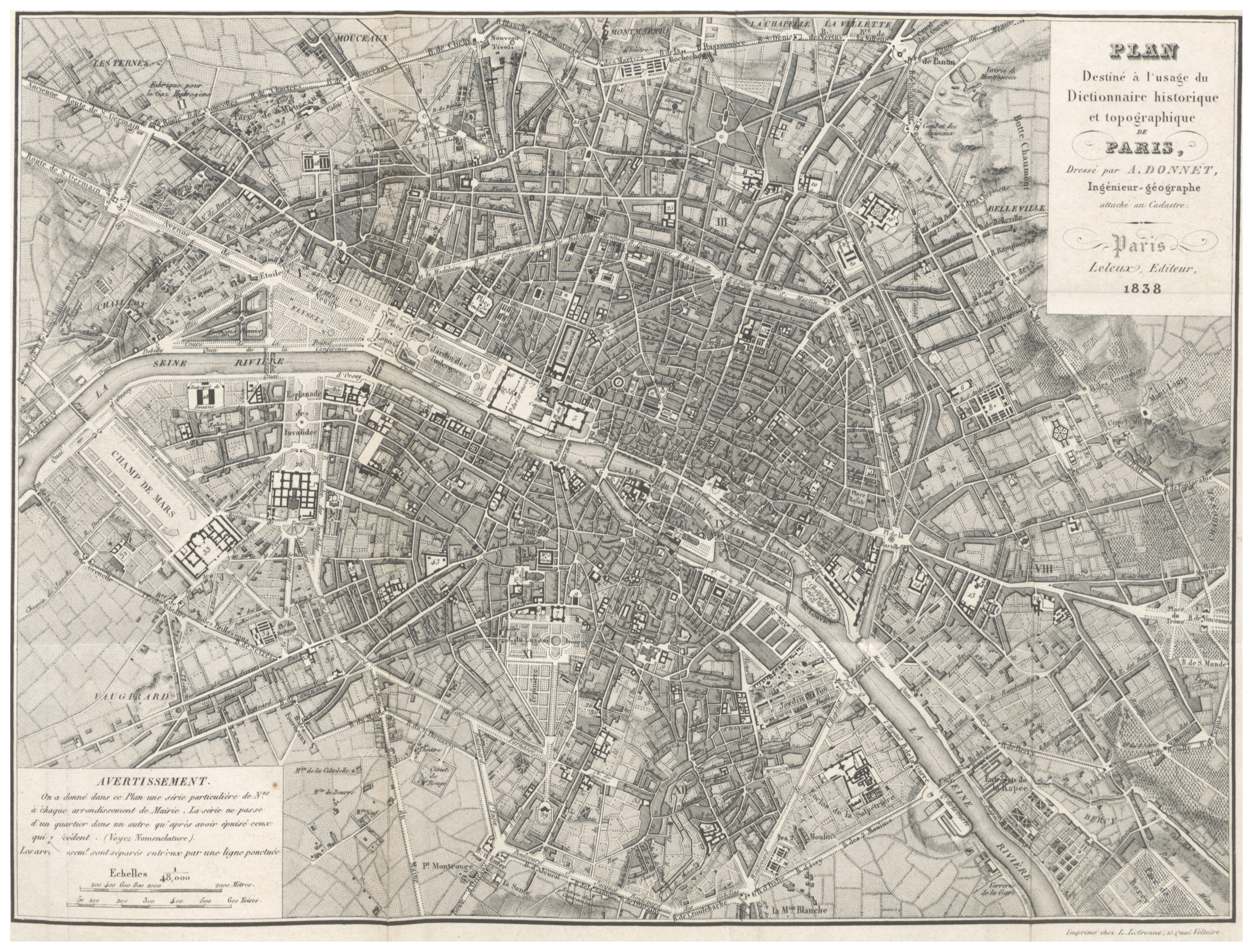
1838

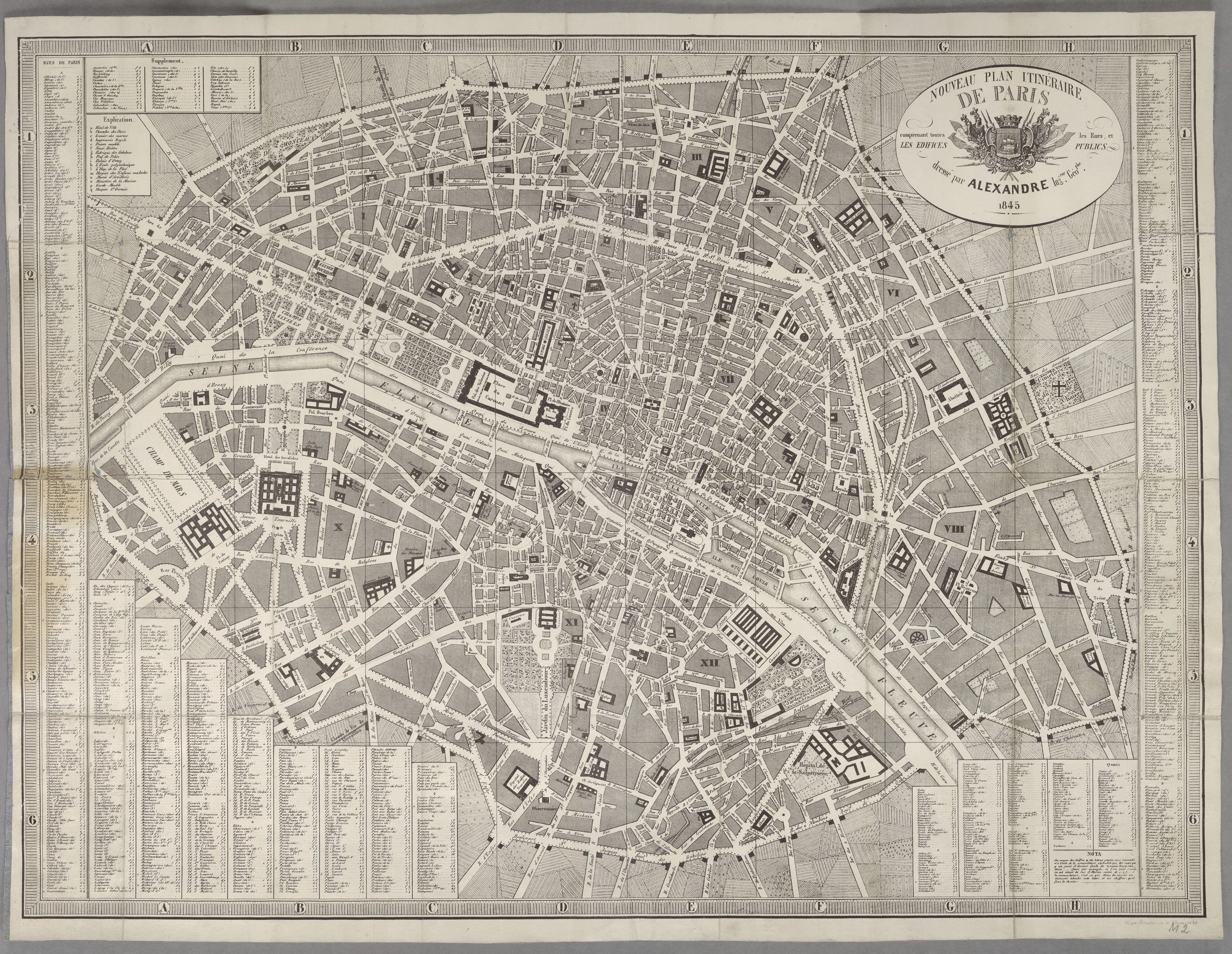
1845

1853

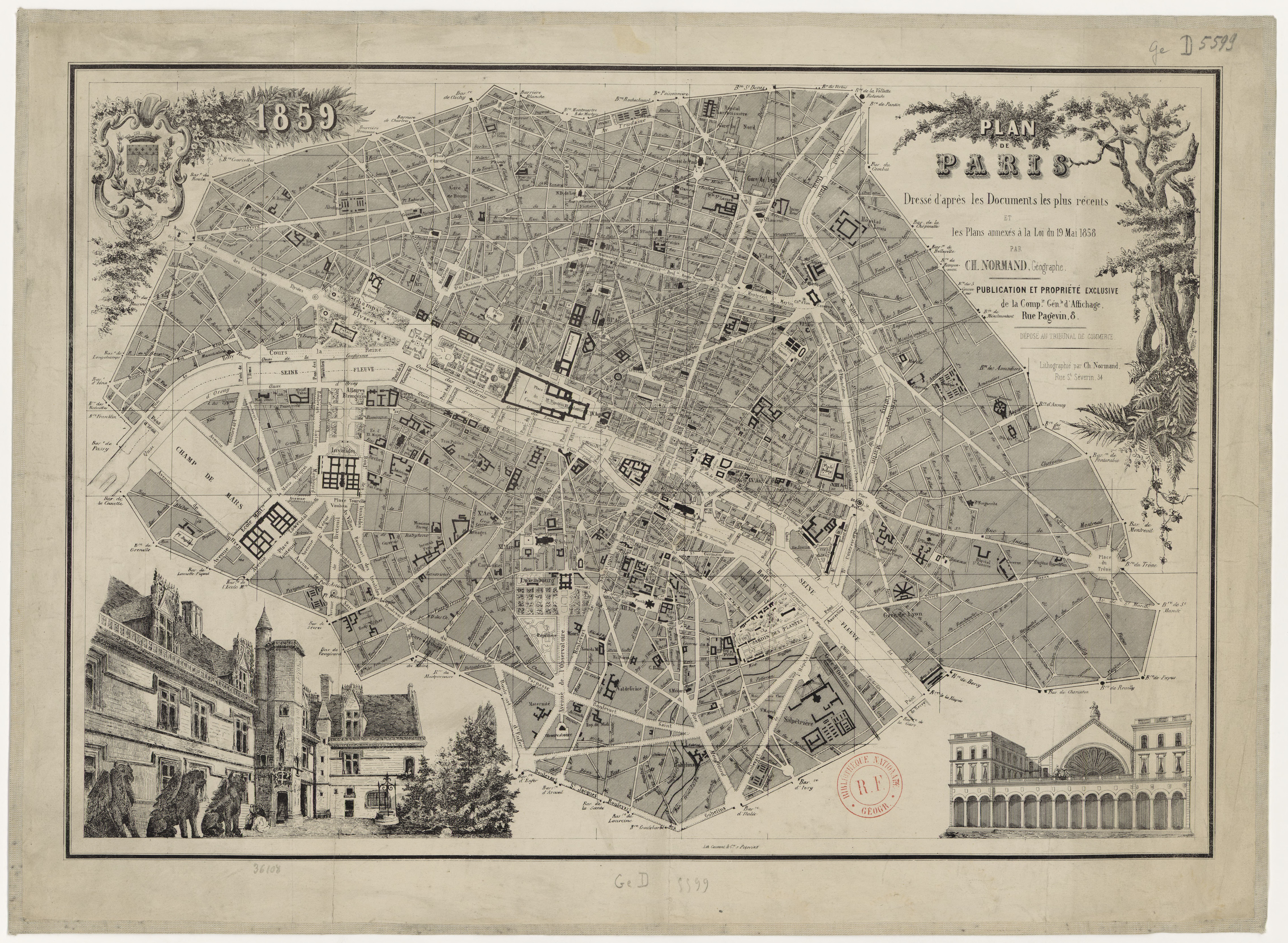
1859

1867

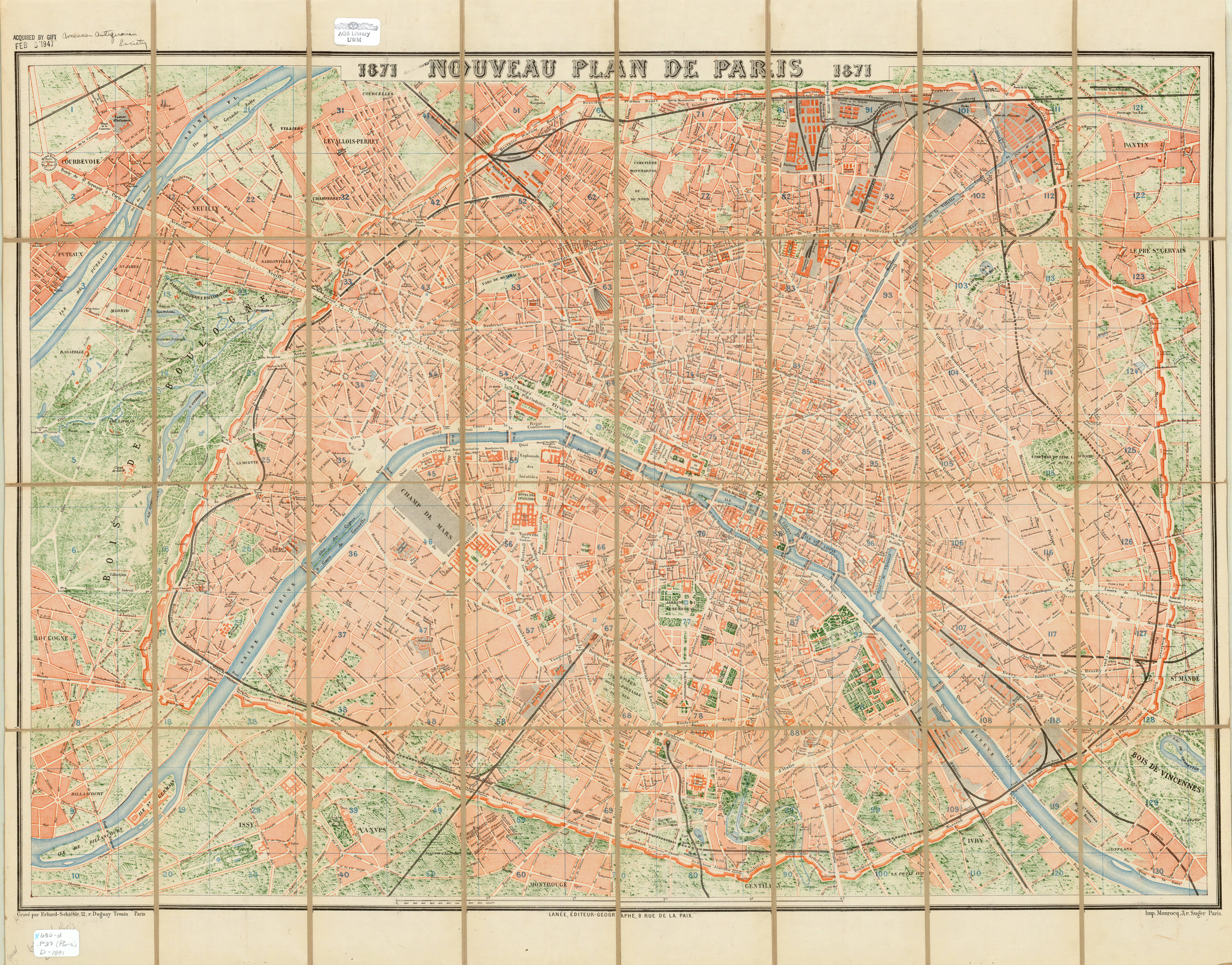
1871

1891

1892

=== 20th century ===
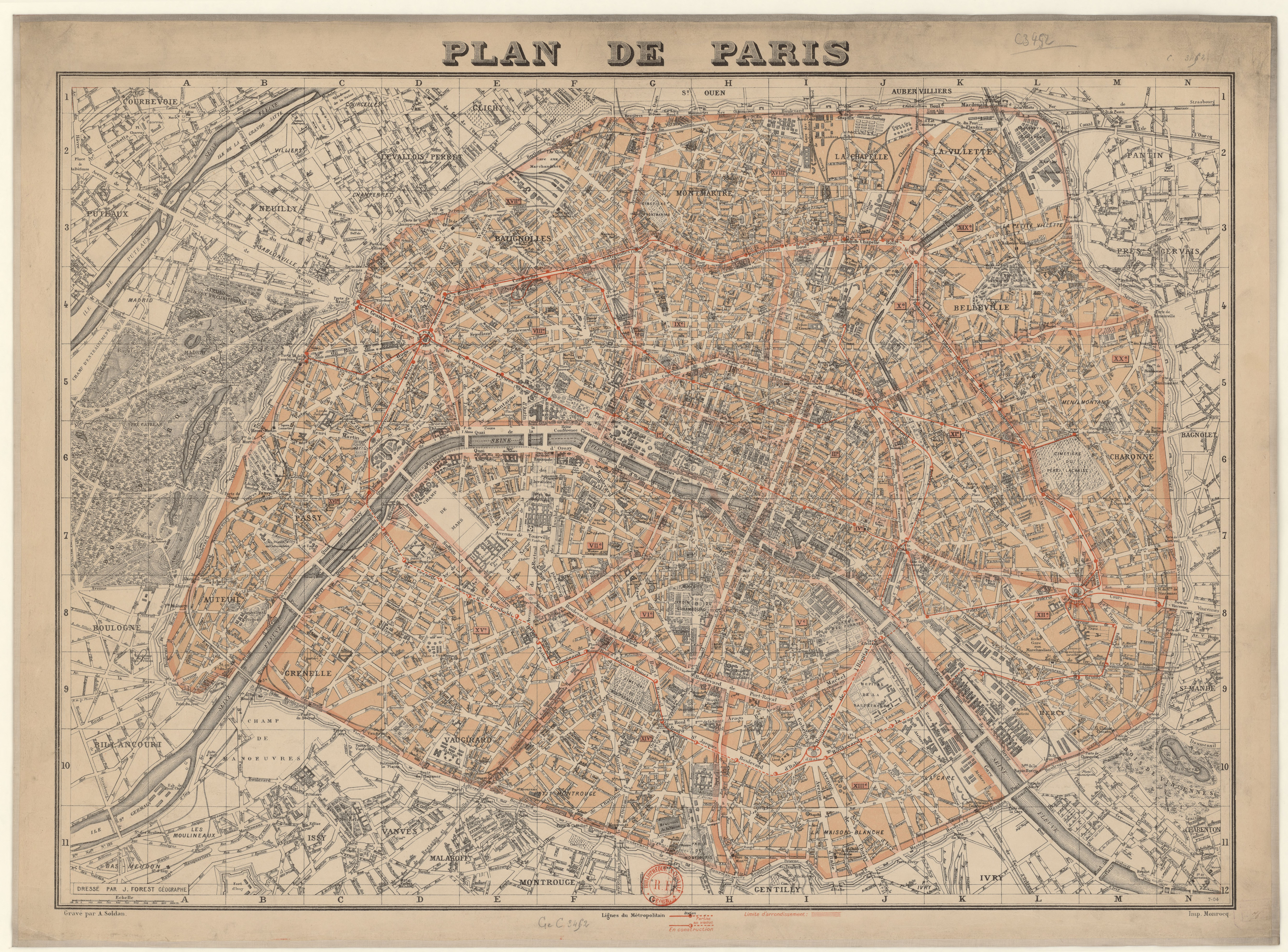
1905

1933

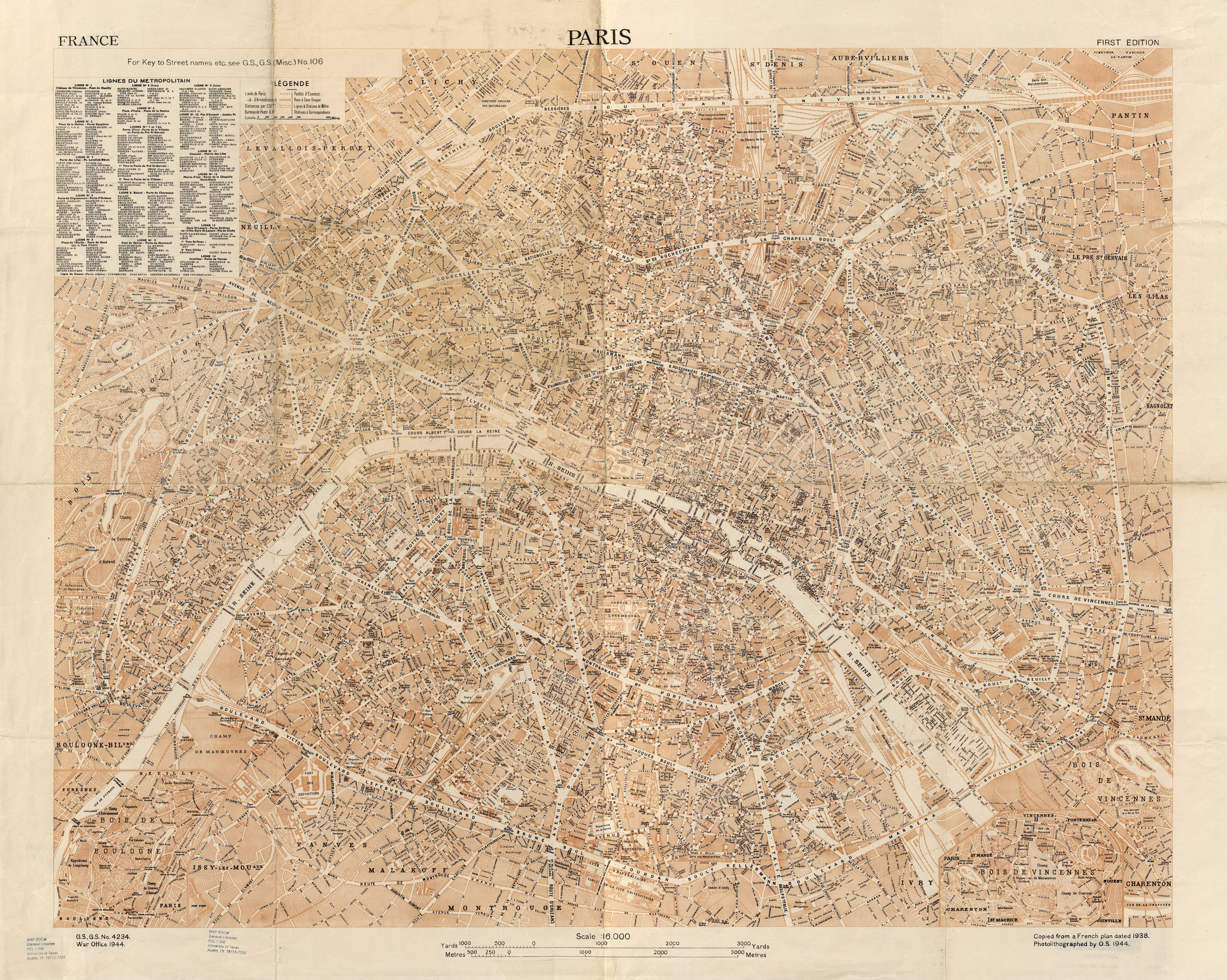
1944

1956

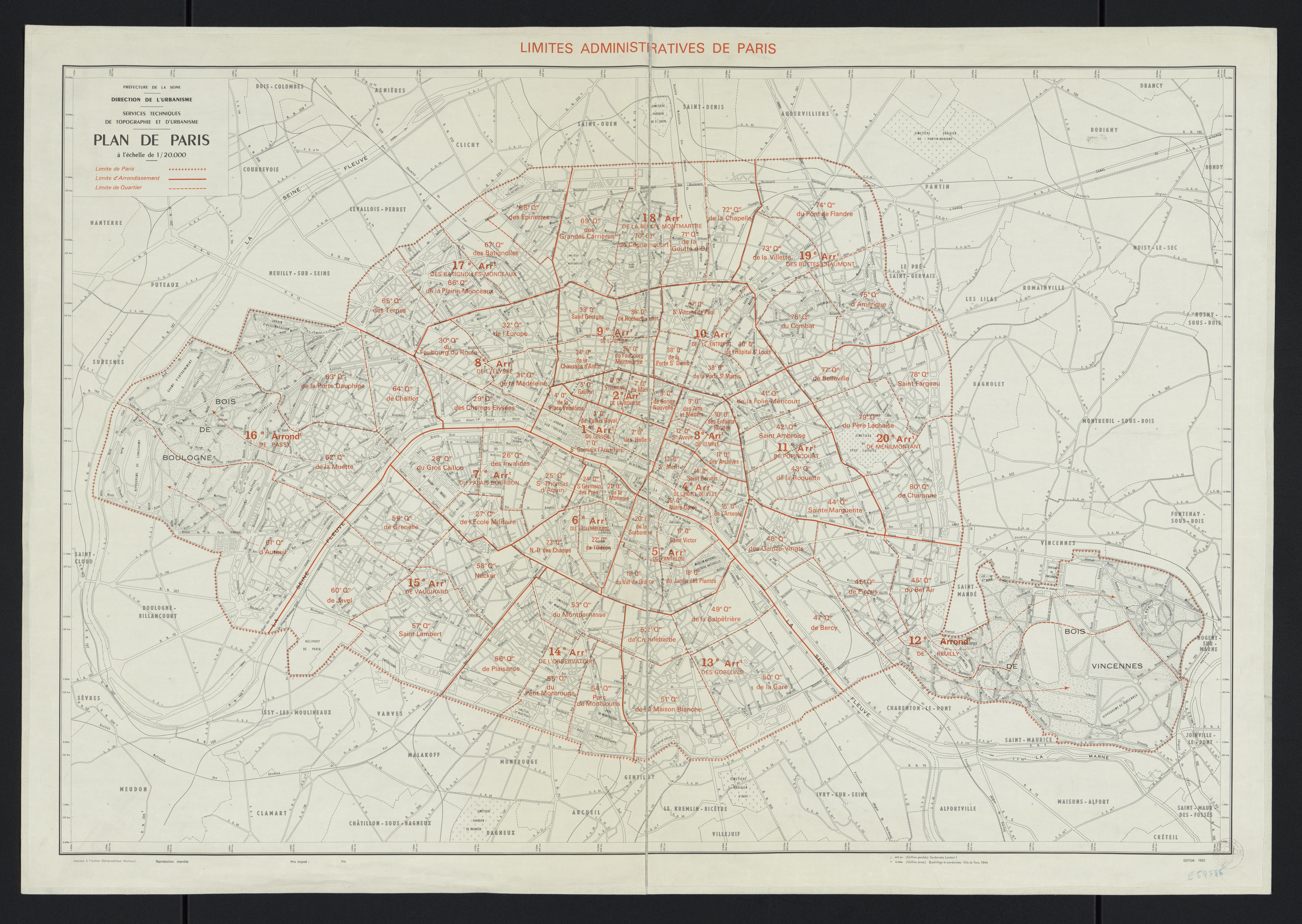
1960

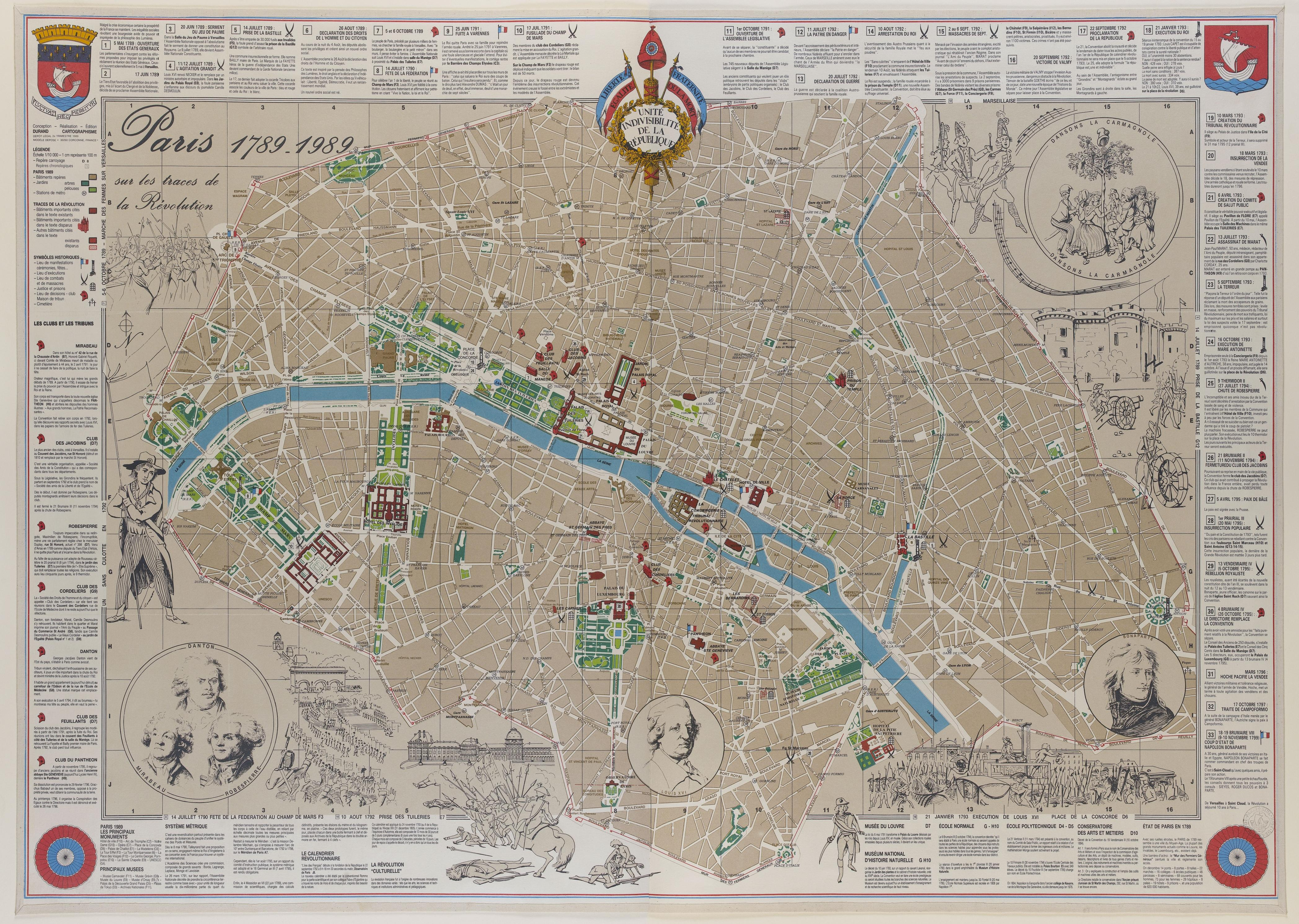
1989

=== 21th century ===
2026

== See also ==
- History of Paris
- List of years in France
